= Hungarian People's Army =

Former Eastern Bloc state's land forces

- Magyar Néphadsereg
- Insignia of the Hungarian People's Army

- Infantry flag of the Hungarian People's Army (1957–1990)
- Founded: 1 June 1951
- Disbanded: 14 March 1990
- Service branches: Surface Forces; Air Defence Forces
- Headquarters: Budapest

Leadership
- Chairman of the Presidential Council: Brunó Ferenc Straub (last)
- Minister of Defence: Ferenc Kárpáti (last)
- Chief of General Staff: László Borsits (last)

Personnel
- Active personnel: 100,000 (1989)
- Deployed personnel: Czechoslovakia Vietnam

Industry
- Foreign suppliers: Soviet Union; Cuba Vietnam Czechoslovakia

Related articles
- History: Korean War; Hungarian Revolution of 1956; Vietnam War; Warsaw Pact invasion of Czechoslovakia
- Ranks: Ranks of the Hungarian People's Army

The Hungarian People's Army (Hungarian: Magyar Néphadsereg, MN) or the HPA was the military of the Hungarian People's Republic and the armed branch of the Hungarian Socialist Workers' Party from 1951 to 1990. It only saw combat in a foreign country once during its existence, which was assisting the Soviet Union in crushing the Prague Spring. It maintained close ties to the Warsaw Pact along with other Eastern Bloc countries. It dissolved in 1989 and retained its current form through the Hungarian Defence Forces.

== History ==
=== Early years ===
Soviet influence over the Hungarian armed forces began to rapidly increase starting in November 1948, "...when hundreds of Soviet military "advisers" were assigned to the Hungarian army from the top all the way down to the regimental level. Although theoretically acting only as advisers, they influenced all important decisions. Beginning in December 1948, thousands of Hungarians began attending Soviet military and political academies to gain technical expertise and political indoctrination. Hungarian generals were sent to Soviet general staff schools."

After the 1948 creation of the HPA the allies and the Soviet Union permitted it to have a 65,000 strong Army and an Air Force with 5,000 personnel and 90 aircraft. The first Minister of Defence Mihály Farkas completely based the HPA off Stalinism until the death of Joseph Stalin in 1953. The HPA mimicked the Soviet Army's Political commissar model, In which party members could teach the ideas of Marxism–Leninism to soldiers of the HPA. After Stalin's death, de-Stalinization swept through the HPA quickly leading to the resignation of Farkas as Minister of Defence.

=== 1956 revolution and aftermath ===
During the Hungarian revolution of 1956, the People's Army was deployed at a minimum. During this period, the Soviet Army invaded Hungary due to the revolution which was taking place. As a result, the Soviets took away most of the HPA's equipment, and dismantled the Air Force. In 1959 they began rebuilding the HPA and the new Hungarian leader János Kádár, asked for 200,000 Soviet troops from the Southern Group of Forces to stay in the country, which led to the government to rely more on the Soviets leading to the deterioration of the HPA.

=== Role in the invasion of Czechoslovakia ===
In 1968, the Soviet Union and four other member states of the Warsaw Pact, building on the doctrine of "limited sovereignty", invaded Czechoslovakia in gross violation of the principle of non-interference in internal affairs (Article 2(7), Chapter I of the United Nations Charter). Bypassing the Parliament, the Hungarian party and the government decided to take part. The designated troops were largely those of 8th Motor Rifle Division. The Hungarian military units were ordered on July 27, 1968, at 3 o'clock in the morning, to be fully operational and to carry out the mobilization of the reservists. The troops occupied Aszód and Rétság on 28 July, and their prepared waiting areas in the area between, and were prepared to carry out the task here. Out of the mobilised Hungarian personnel, four were killed in accidents.

The Danube Flotilla was incorporated into the Ground Forces in 1968.

=== Reorganization and modernization ===
In the late 1970s, the top political leadership demanded that the military leadership propose an organizational structure better suited to the size, geographical location, position in the Warsaw Pact, and changes in armaments and technology. The aim was to create an army that was better suited to the size and military geographical position of Hungary smaller than the existing one, and with less but more modern equipment. At the end of 1984, General Lajos Czinege was retired. The plans, drawn up in consultation with the Commander-in-Chief of the Joint Armed Forces, provided for substantial changes in both forces, the implementation of which would begin in 1985. This was the so-called "RUBIN task", which was in all respects a modernization and reorganization policy that aimed to:

- continue the Hungarian commitments to the Warsaw Pact
- provide the HPA with modern and advanced equipment
- adapt the military doctrinal practices to the changing times

This policy eliminated the division level organization in both forces, and thus, four corps were created, three land forces and one for domestic air defence, replacing eight divisions.

The Air Defence and Aviation Command was established to provide domestic air defence. On the basis of the disbanded 1st Home Air Defence Army Command and the two Air Force Divisions, the 1st Hungarian Air Defence Corps Command was established in Veszprém, incorporating the newly formed brigades of Hungarian Air Defence (air-missile and radio-technical units). As a result of the replacement of reconnaissance aircraft with more modern ones, an independent squadron was organised on the basis of personnel of the 101st reconnaissance aircraft regiment. Transport and combat helicopters were organised into regiment-level units.

For ground troops, although the army corps command level (5th Army Command) and army corps direct-reporting troops remained unchanged, an entirely new structure emerged with the abolition of divisions and many of the regiments and the introduction of NATO styled brigade organizations, a first in the Warsaw Pact. This meant that the 1st Mechanized Corps was set up in Tata and the 2nd Mechanized Corps in Kaposvár. The 3rd Corps, which had been independent in Cegléd until then, was subordinated to the 5th Army Command. Each land forces corps, by 1988, included five brigades (infantry and armored) organized into a brigade HQ and the combat, combat support and service battalions and/or companies under the brigade framework.

In 1981 Danube Flotilla received six AM type modern minesweepers, and by 1988 it consisted of 700 men and eighty-two vessels, including ten Nestin MSI (riverine) boats. During wartime its chief functions would have been to clear the Danube River and Tisza River of mines, and, in addition, to assist the Hungarian Ground Forces and other Warsaw Pact armies to successfully transport their men and its materiel across rivers.

=== End of the HPA ===
Soviet troops relaxed their control during the era of Mikhail Gorbachev, and Hungary later became a Democratic Republic. As it moved on from socialism the HPA was converted into the new model, officially dissolving the HPA and becoming the new Hungarian Defence Force.

== Structure ==
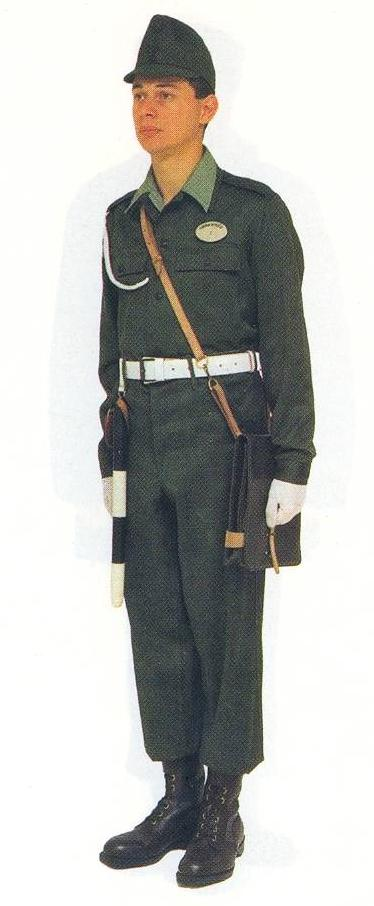
Uniform of the HPA police force

The HPA included the Hungarian Ground Forces and the Air and Air Defence Forces. In the early 1980s, it was estimated that the ground forces accounted for 90 percent of the HPA. By 1 July 1986, the International Institute for Strategic Studies estimated that the Ground Forces and the Danube Flotilla had 83,000 personnel (including 50,000 conscripts), and the Air Forces 22,000 (including 8,000 conscripts) for a total of 105,000 personnel. Four years later, a less precise 1989 manpower estimate was approximately 100,000, of which about 64,000 were conscripts.

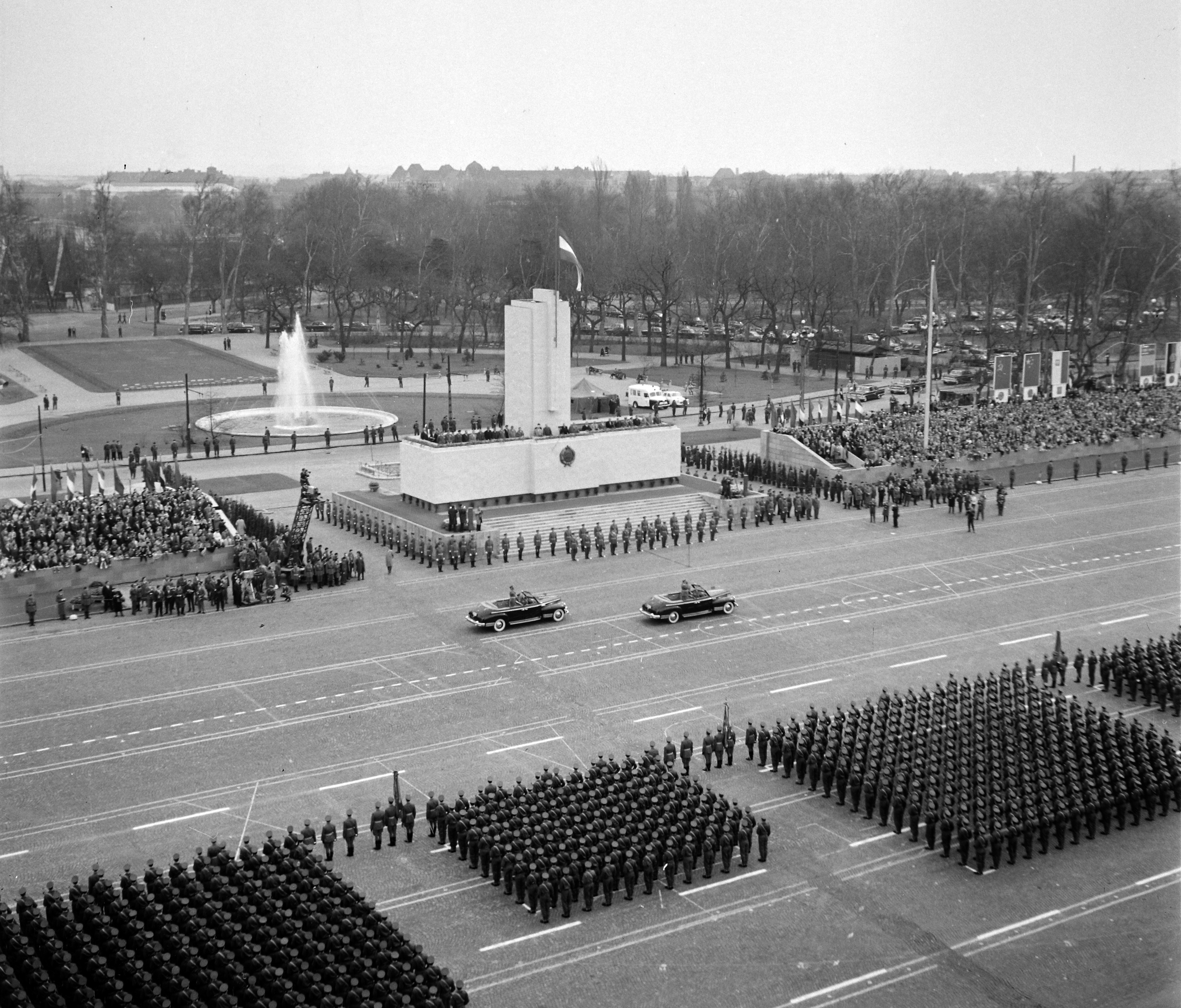
HPA troops on parade in April 4th

In 1963 the Ground Forces were organised into:

- 5th Army at Székesfehérvár
  - 7th Motor Rifle Division at Kiskunfélegyháza
  - 8th Motor Rifle Division at Zalaegerszeg
  - 9th Motor Rifle Division at Kaposvár
  - 11th Tank Division at Tata
  - 34th Special Reconnaissance Battalion at Székesfehérvár
- 3rd Army Corps at Cegléd
  - 4th Motor Rifle Division at Gyöngyös
  - 15th Motor Rifle Division at Nyíregyháza

Tactical Aviation Command at Veszprém (later relocated to Börgönd)

- 101st Reconnaissance Regiment at Szolnok (relocated to Taszár in 1984 as a reconnaissance squadron)
- 87th Attack Helicopter Regiment at Szentkirályszabadja (upgraded to brigade in 1987)
- 89th Composite Air Transport Regiment at Szolnok (formed in 1984 as the 101st Reconnaissance regiment vacated the air base)
- 90th Command Support and Courier Helicopter Regiment at Börgönd
- 93rd Composite Air Squadron at Tököl

1st Homeland Air Defence Army Command at Veszprém

- 1st Air Defence Division at Veszprém
  - 47th Fighter Regiment at Pápa
  - 31st Fighter Regiment at Taszár
  - 11th Air-defence Artillery Brigade at Budapest, after 1977 Érd
  - 104th Air-defence Artillery Regiment Nagytarcsa after Szabadszállás
  - 45th Radiotechnical Warning Regiment at Taszár
- 2nd Air Defence Division at Miskolc
  - 59th Fighter Regiment at Kecskemét
  - 105th Air-defence Artillery Regiment at Miskolc
  - 54th Radiotechnical Warning Regiment at Kecskemét

The 1st Homeland Air Defence Army and its two constituent air defence divisions were merged in 1984 into the 1st Homeland Air Defence Corps. It took over the three fighter air regiments, the air defence brigade and the two air defence regiments and the 54th and 45th radar regiments merged into the 54th Radiotechnical Brigade. All the homeland air defence units carried the 'Honi' [Homeland] prefix in their official designations.

== HPA security forces ==
In the early 1980s, there were also four separate internal security forces under the Ministry of Interior. These included the Internal Security Troops (Belső Karhatalom); the State Security Authority (Államvédelmi Hatóság, ÁVH)'s Security Police (disbanded in 1956, replaced with the MI Department III), the Frontier Guard or Border Guard (Határőrseg, HO), wearing army uniforms, 15,000 strong; and the Workers' Militia (Munkás Őrseg, MŐ). By mid-1986 it was estimated that the Frontier Guards were 16,000 strong, with 11,000 conscripts, divided into 11 districts.

== Equipment ==
Hungary had the smallest number of aircraft and least equipment in the Warsaw Pact.

In the 1950s the Army was equipped with T-34/85 tanks, as well as 68 IS-2s, which were in service between 1950 and 1956. After the crackdown of the Hungarian Revolution of 1956 all were returned to the Soviet Union.

The Army had 1,200 T-54 and T-55 tanks in 1988. It also had about 100 Soviet-made T-72s in its inventory. The HPA's artillery included 225 M-1938 120mm and 50 M-1943 or D-1 howitzers. It also included 90 2S1 122mm and 20 2S3 152mm self-propelled guns. The Army had 26 river minelayers/sweepers (25 tons), 26 mine countermeasure river vessels, 15 river patrol craft (10 tons), 5 small river utility landing craft, Small river troop transport vessels, and river icebreakers.

=== Small arms ===
Name	Origin	Type	Caliber	Photo	Notes
Handguns
Pisztoly 63 Minta	Hungarian People's Republic	Semi-automatic pistol	9 × 18 mm		Commonly known as "PA 63M". Frame is not blued for simplicity in manufacture but the frame was blued in later production. In service from 1963 until 1996 when replaced by the FÉG P9RC in Hungarian Defence Forces service.
Pisztoly 48 Minta	Hungarian People's Republic	Semi-automatic pistol	7.62 × 25 mm		Hungarian made TT-33
TT-33 pistol	USSR	Semi-automatic pistol	7.62 × 25 mm		Limited amounts purchased prior to domestic manufacture of 48.M TT-33 copy.
Rendõrségi Pisztoly 48.M (48.Minta)	Hungarian People's Republic	Semi-automatic pistol	7.65 × 17 mm		Hungarian copy of the Walther PP pistol. Mainly used by police, during 1956 revolution was offered to party officials for self defense.
Assault rifles
AK-63	Hungarian People's Republic	Assault rifle	7.62 × 39 mm		Standard service rifle
AKM-63 Gépkarabély	Hungarian People's Republic	Assault rifle	7.62 × 39 mm		Perforated Metal Handguard and foregrip, folding stock version also manufactured.
AMD-65 Gépkarabély	Hungarian People's Republic	Assault rifle	7.62 × 39 mm		AKM-63 with folding stock and shortened barrel
AMP-69 Gépkarabély	Hungarian People's Republic	Assault rifle	7.62 × 39 mm		Special rifle for shooting rifle grenades
AK-55 Gépkarabély	Hungarian People's Republic	Assault rifle	7.62 × 39 mm		Copy of AK-47
Machine guns
RPK Machine Gun	Hungarian People's Republic	Light machine gun	7.62 × 39 mm		Licensed manufacture by Fémáru és Szerszámgépyár (FÉG), Budapest. Folding stock for paratrooper version.
PK Könnyű Géppuska	Hungarian People's Republic	General-purpose machine gun	7.62 × 54 mmR		PK, PKB, PKS. Licensed manufacture by Fémáru és Szerszámgépyár (FÉG), Budapest. Available with PPN-3 scope sight.
RPD machine gun	Soviet Union	Light machine gun	7.62 × 39 mm		
DP Golyószóró	Soviet Union	Light machine gun	7.62 × 54 mmR		Adopted after pressure from USSR to replace Solothurn machine guns. DPM, and DTM also used.
7.62mm KGK Géppuska	Hungarian People's Republic	General-purpose machine gun	7.62 × 54 mmR		Manufactured by Fémárú Fegyver és Gépgyár, Budapest, Hungary.
Submachine guns
VZ.61/VZ.62 Skorpion machine pistol	CSSR	Submachine gun	7.65 × 17 mm		Known as 7,65 mm SHE-61 Géppisztoly in Hungarian service. Also used by police forces special service.
Géppisztoly 48.Minta	Hungarian People's Republic	Submachine gun	7.62 × 25 mm		Hungarian made PPSH-41. Towards the 1970s was relegated to use by Border Guards, Police Forces, Workers' Militia, and Reserve Forces.
PPSH-41	USSR	Submachine gun	7.62 × 25 mm		Limited amounts purchased prior to domestic manufacture of 48.M.
Kucher Model K1	Hungarian People's Republic	Submachine gun	7.62 × 25 mm		Known as Gepisztoly 53 Minta or as the "Spigon submachine gun", Referred to as 'Pénzügyőr Géppisztoly' (Financier/Treasury Machine Gun), in service from 1953 to 1960s mostly with Border Guards and Treasury officers, replaced by PPSH-41/48M and out of service by 1960s.
Danuvia 43M submachine gun	Kingdom of Hungary (1920–1946)	Submachine gun	9 × 25 mm		In service until early 1950s.
Sniper rifles
SVD Dragunov	Soviet Union	Semi-automatic sniper rifle	7.62 × 54 mmR		
Távcsöves Mesterlövö Gyalogsági Puska, 48.Minta	Hungarian People's Republic	Bolt-action sniper rifle	7.62 × 54 mmR		A direct copy of the original Soviet Model 1891/30 sniper rifle
Bolt-action rifles
Gyalogsági Puska, 48.M (48.Minta)	Hungarian People's Republic	Bolt-action rifle	7.62 × 54 mmR		Hungarian made M1891/30 rifle.
Gyalogsági Karabély, 48.Minta	Hungarian People's Republic	Bolt-action rifle	7.62 × 54 mmR		Hungarian made M44 Mosin Nagant carbine.
Mosin Nagant M1891/30	USSR	Bolt-action rifle	7.62 × 54 mmR		Purchased in limited numbers.
Mosin Nagant M44 carbine	USSR	Bolt-action rifle	7.62 × 54 mmR		Purchased in limited numbers.
Hand grenades
42 M. Vécsey kézigránát	Hungarian People's Republic	Hand grenade	48 mm		Hungarian made offensive stick grenade, can screw on additional "heads" to increase power.
RKG-3 anti-tank grenade	Soviet Union	Anti-tank grenade			Also 3M and 3T
Rocket-propelled grenade launchers
RPG-7	Soviet Union	Rocket-propelled grenade	85 mm		7V and 7D
RPG-2	Soviet Union	Rocket-propelled grenade	82 mm		
Flamethrowers
Model 51 Flamethrower	Hungarian People's Republic	Flamethrower	N/A		Max range of 20 meters

=== Crew-served weapons ===
Name	Origin	Type	Caliber	Photo	Notes
Heavy machine guns
SGM Nehéz Géppuska	Hungarian People's Republic	Heavy machine gun	7.62 × 54 mmR		Cop of SG Goryunov, manufactured by Fémárú Fegyver és Gépgyár, Budapest, Hungary.
DShK	Soviet Union	Heavy machine gun	12.7 × 108 mm		
KPV heavy machine gun	Soviet Union	Heavy machine gun	14.5 × 114 mm		
Recoilless rifles
B-11 recoilless rifle	Soviet Union	Recoilless rifle	107 mm		
SPG-9 recoilless rifle	Soviet Union	Recoilless rifle	73 mm		
Anti-tank guns
T-12 100mm/2A19	Soviet Union	Anti-tank gun	100 mm		MT-12 version, 106 Delivered 1973-1975
85 mm divisional gun D-44	Soviet Union	Field gun	85 mm		100 guns.
57 mm anti-tank gun M1943 (ZiS-2)	Soviet Union	Anti-tank gun	57 mm		
76 mm divisional gun M1942 (ZiS-3)	Soviet Union	Field gun	76 mm		
Mortars
82-BM-37	Soviet Union	Infantry mortar	82 mm		
2B11	Soviet Union	Mortar	120 mm		25, delivered 1988
120-PM-43 mortar	Soviet Union	Mortar	120 mm		101
Anti-tank guided missile
9M14 Malyutka	Soviet Union	ATGM MCLOS	125 mm		12500, Incl for BMP-1 IFV and Mi-24 Attack helicopter.
9K111 Fagot	Soviet Union	ATGM SACLOS	120 mm		300 Delivered 1982-83
9M113 Konkurs	Soviet Union	ATGM SACLOS	135 mm		2060 Delivered 1985; 1986; 1987; 1988, including for BRDM-2 tank destroyers.
3M6 Shmel	Soviet Union	ATGM MCLOS	136 mm		
9M17 Fleyta	Soviet Union	ATGM MCLOS	148 mm		

=== Armoured vehicles ===
Name	Origin	Type	Quantity	Photo	Notes
Tanks
T-72M/M1	Soviet Union	Main battle tank	138		T-72M Delivered 1979-1987, from Czechoslovak and Polish stockpiles. Also VT-72B recovery vehicle.
T-55	Soviet Union	Main battle tank	1,200 (T-54 & T-55)		T-54 and T-55A. 800 T-55s delivered 1964-1965, 300 T-54 delivered 1958-1960. Also VT-55 recovery vehicle and MT-55 bridge vehicles.
PT-76	Soviet Union	Amphibious light tank	100		
T-34/85	Czechoslovakia	Medium tank	150		Delivered 1954-55, From Czechoslovak production line
IS-2	Soviet Union	Heavy tank	68		Returned to USSR after 1956 Uprising
Armored personnel carriers and armored reconnaissance
BMP-1	Czechoslovakia	Infantry fighting vehicle	500		Czechoslovak supplied, ordered 1973–1978, included BRM-1K reconnaissance vehicles
BRDM-2	Soviet Union	Amphibious armored scout car	450		350 Armored Reconnaissance vehicles ordered 1969–1975, 100 Tank Destroyers equipped with Konkurs ATGMs ordered 1973–1977. Also VS BRDM-2 (NBC Recon variant)
BTR-60P	Soviet Union	Armored personnel carrier	150		Delivered 1963
D-442 FUG	Hungarian People's Republic	Amphibious armored scout car	400		5 variations in use: D-442.00 FÚG (Basic armoured scout car without the turret), D-442.01 PK-FÚG, D-442.03 VS-FÚG, D-442.01 MRP-FÚG, and D-442.02 MÜ-FÚG.
D-944 PSZH	Hungarian People's Republic	Armoured personnel carrier	1000		7 variations in use: D-944.00 PSZH (Basic APC with KPVT+KGKT Turret), D-944.00M PSzH-M, D-944.00 PSZH-F, D-944.77 PSZH, D-944.31 SZDPK-PSZH, D-944.21 ZPK-PSZH, D-944.22 ZTÖF-PSZH, and D-944.21 OPK-PSZH.
MTLB	Soviet Union	Armored personnel carrier and Prime mover	30		Delivered 1975-76
BTR-50	Soviet Union	Armored personnel carrier	150		Delivered 1960, Incl BTR-50PU Command post version
BTR-40	Soviet Union	Armored personnel carrier	200		Delivered 1953
BTR-152	Soviet Union	Armored personnel carrier	160		Delivered 1950-51
OT-62 TOPAS	CSSR	Armored personnel carrier			
OT-64 SKOT	Czechoslovakia	Armored personnel carrier			
Assault guns
SU-76M	Czechoslovakia	Self-propelled gun			
ISU-122	Soviet Union	Assault gun			
SU-100	Soviet Union	Assault gun	50		Delivered 1950–51

=== Unarmoured vehicles ===
Name	Origin	Type	Quantity	Photo	Notes
Trucks
GAZ-66	Soviet Union	4×4 truck			
Ural 375	Soviet Union	4.5 ton, 6×6 truck			
Robur LO 1800 A	East Germany	Truck			
Tatra 141	CSSR	Truck			
Avia A-30	Hungarian People's Republic	1.2 ton 4×4 truck			Hungarian version of French Saviem-Renault TP-3MB. Additional models include A-30K with short bed and A-30L with a longer plank cargo bed.
Csepel D-352	Hungarian People's Republic	3.5 ton 4×2 truck			Built on license from Steyr of Austria. Built in both tank truck and dump truck versions. Replaced by Csepel D-420 since 1955/1956.
Csepel D-344	Hungarian People's Republic	3.5 ton 4×4 truck			Replaced the Csepel D-352 and D-420. Dump truck model is D-445.
Csepel D-420	Hungarian People's Republic	4 ton 4×4 truck			Box bodied version used as signal van, mobile workshop, ambulance, tanker truck, and tactical command post.
Csepel D-564	Hungarian People's Republic	5 ton 4×4 truck			
Csepel D-566	Hungarian People's Republic	8 ton, 6×6 truck			
Prime movers
Csepel K-800	Hungarian People's Republic	Prime mover			Licensed copy of Ya-12 artillery tractor/light tracked artillery tractor M-2
PTS-2	Soviet Union	Tracked amphibious transport	50		
Utility vehicles/light transport
UAZ-469	Soviet Union	Utility vehicle			
GAZ-69	Soviet Union	Utility truck			

=== Anti-aircraft weapons ===
Name	Origin	Type	Quantity	Photo	Notes
Self-propelled anti-aircraft guns
ZSU-57-2	Soviet Union	Self-propelled anti-aircraft weapon	40		Delivered in 1966, Second hand
ZSU-23-4	Soviet Union	Self-propelled anti-aircraft weapon	50		Delivered 1969
Anti-aircraft guns
AZP S-60	Soviet Union	Autocannon			
ZU-23	Soviet Union	Autocannon			
ZPU-2	Hungarian People's Republic	Heavy machine gun			Hungarian manufactured
ZPU-4	Hungarian People's Republic	Heavy machine gun			Hungarian manufactured
KS-19	USSR	Dual-purpose gun			
Surface-to-air missiles
S-200 missile system	Soviet Union	Surface to Air Missile			
S-75M Volga	Soviet Union	Surface to Air Missile	12		S-75M2 and S-73M3 versions
S-75 Dvina	Soviet Union	Surface to Air Missile	18		
S-125 Neva/Pechora	Soviet Union	Surface to Air Missile	6		
2K12 Kub	Soviet Union	Surface to Air Missile	50		
2K11 Krug	Soviet Union	Surface to Air Missile	30		Original deliver of 6, 30 by 1989.
9K31 Strela-1	Soviet Union	surface-to-air missile	72		Delivered 1979-83
9K33 Osa	Soviet Union	surface-to-air missile	?		
Radar systems
P-37 Radar	Soviet Union	Target Acquisition radar			
1S91	Soviet Union	Target Acquisition radar			
SON-9	Soviet Union	Target Acquisition radar	32		For use with S-60 57mm Anti-aircraft gun
PRV-9	Soviet Union	Height finding radar	5		Delivered in 1977-9. For use with SA-4 and SA-6 SAM systems
P-12	Soviet Union	air search radar	3		Delivered 1963-65. For use with SA-2 SAM systems
P-40 radar	Soviet Union	air search radar	10		Delivered in 1977-79. For use with SA-6 SAM systems
PRV-11	Soviet Union	Height finding radar	3		Delivered in 1963-65.
PRV-13	Soviet Union	Height finding radar	1		Delivered in 1976.
Command vehicles
BTR-60PU-12	Soviet Union	Air Defense Command Vehicle	7		Ordered 1979-83 Part of 7 SA-13/9K35 SAM batteries
Man-portable air-defense system
9K34 Strela-3	Soviet Union	Man-portable air-defense system	300		Delivered 1987-89
9K32 Strela-2	Soviet Union	Man-portable air-defense system			

=== Ballistic missiles ===
Name	Origin	Type	Quantity	Photo	Notes
Tactical ballistic missiles
9K52 Luna-M	Soviet Union	Tactical ballistic missile	24		
OTR-21 Tochka	Soviet Union	Tactical ballistic missile	6		Ordered 6 in 1987, 40 9M79 Tochka Missiles, "Probably incl for use with nuclear warheads (under Soviet control)"
R-11 Zemlya	Soviet Union	Tactical ballistic missile	16		Ordered in 1960, for use with Soviet nuclear warheads (under Soviet control)

=== Artillery ===
Name	Origin	Type	Quantity	Photo	Notes
Field artillery
122 mm gun M1931/37 (A-19)	Soviet Union	Field howitzer	?		
122 mm howitzer M1938 (M-30)	Soviet Union	Field howitzer	230		Delivered 1954-55
122 mm howitzer 2A18 (D-30)	Soviet Union	Field howitzer	?		
152 mm howitzer-gun M1937 (ML-20)	Soviet Union	Field howitzer	?		
152 mm gun-howitzer D-20	Soviet Union	Field howitzer	302		Delivered 1959-64
152 mm howitzer M1943 (D-1)	Soviet Union	Field howitzer	50		Delivered 1954, second hand
2S1 Gvozdika (122mm)	Soviet Union	Self-propelled artillery	151		Delivered 1980-83, Incl from Bulgarian production line
2S3 Akatsiya (152mm)	Soviet Union	Self-propelled artillery	18		Delivered 1981
Multiple rocket launcher
BM-21 Grad	Soviet Union	Multiple rocket launcher	66		122mm MLRS
BM-13	Soviet Union	Multiple rocket launcher	12		132mm MLRS

=== Aircraft ===
Name	Origin	Type	Quantity	Photo	Notes
Helicopters
Mi-24V/Mi-35a	Soviet Union	Attack helicopter	10		Delivered in 1985
Mi-24D/Mi-25	Soviet Union	Attack helicopter	30		20 delivered in 1978 and 1980, 10 more ordered and delivered in 1985
Mi-9	Soviet Union	Airborne command post	1		1 1989
Mi-17	Soviet Union	Transport helicopter	7		Delivered in 1989, Incl 2 Mi-17P (Hip-K) EW version
Mi-8T	Soviet Union	Transport helicopter	25		2 Delivered in 1982. 25 by in 1989.
Mil Mi-2	Soviet Union	Light helicopter	36		Delivered in 1982-86, Polish origin
Ka-26	Soviet Union	Light helicopter	22		Delivered 1975-78
Mil-4A	Soviet Union	Helicopter	20		Delivered 1955
Mil Mi-1	Soviet Union	Helicopter	5		Delivered 1962
PZL SM-2	Polish People's Republic	Helicopter			
Fighter planes
MiG-23M	Soviet Union	Fighter aircraft	15		Delivered in 1979 and 1981, MiG-23MF version; incl 3 MiG-23UM version
MiG-21bis	Soviet Union	Fighter aircraft	50		Delivered in 1975; 1976; 1978; 1979; 1980
MiG-21MF	Soviet Union	Fighter aircraft	53		Delivered in 1971; 1973; 1974
MiG-21F-13	Soviet Union	Fighter aircraft	132		Delivered in 1961, 1962; 1963; 1964; 1965; 1966; 1967
MiG-19	Soviet Union	Fighter aircraft	40		Delivered in 1968, second hand from Czechoslovakia 0
MiG-19PM	Soviet Union	Fighter aircraft	40		Delivered in 1959-60. Outfitted with K-5 SRAAM Missiles
MiG-17PF	Soviet Union	Fighter aircraft	16		Delivered 1958, Hungarian designation Csuszo
Mig-17	Soviet Union	Fighter aircraft	40		Delivered 1958
MiG-15 bis	Soviet Union	Fighter aircraft	18		Delivered in 1957.
Mig-15	Soviet Union	Fighter aircraft	300		Delivered 1954-54, Hungarian designation Jaguar.
Sukhoi SU-7B	Soviet Union	FGA aircraft	40		Delivered in 1967-68
Sukhoi SU-22	Soviet Union	FGA aircraft	15		Delivered in 1981, Incl 3 Su-22M-3 trainer version.
Bombers
Sukhoi Su-25	Soviet Union	Ground attack	15		
Ilyushin Il-28	Soviet Union	Medium bomber	26		Delivered in 1957, 1960, 1961
Tupolev Tu-2S	Soviet Union	Medium bomber	59		Delivered in 1953
IL-10 Sturmovik	Soviet Union	Ground attack	150		Hungarian designation Ruszko; incl B-33 version from Czechoslovak production line. Delivered 1950; 1953; 1954
Transport
Ilyushin Il-14	Soviet Union	Transport aircraft	2		
Antonov An-24/26	Soviet Union	Transport aircraft	24		Incl 2 An-24V version for VIP transport.
L-410 Turbolet	CSSR	Transport aircraft	1		Delivered 1981
Antonov An-2	Soviet Union	Transport aircraft	2		Delivered 1957.
Yak-12	Soviet Union	Transport aircraft	3		Delivered 1955.
Z-43	CSSR	Transport aircraft	4		Delivered 1976.
Li-2T	Soviet Union	Transport aircraft	11		Delivered 1950–1952, Hungarian designation Teve
Training
Aero L-29 Delfín	CSSR	Trainer aircraft	30		Delivered 1964 and 1974.
MiG-21MF	Soviet Union	Fighter aircraft/trainer aircraft	28		Delivered in 1971; 1973; 1975; 1978; 1980, MiG-21UM version
Mig-15UTI	Soviet Union	Trainer aircraft			
Yak-18	Soviet Union	Trainer aircraft	40		Delivered 1950; 1951
Yak-11	Soviet Union	Trainer aircraft	40		Delivered 1954, from Czechoslovak production line; Hungarian designation Parduc
Reconnaissance
Antonov An-30	Soviet Union	Reconnaissance aircraft	1		

== Military conscription ==
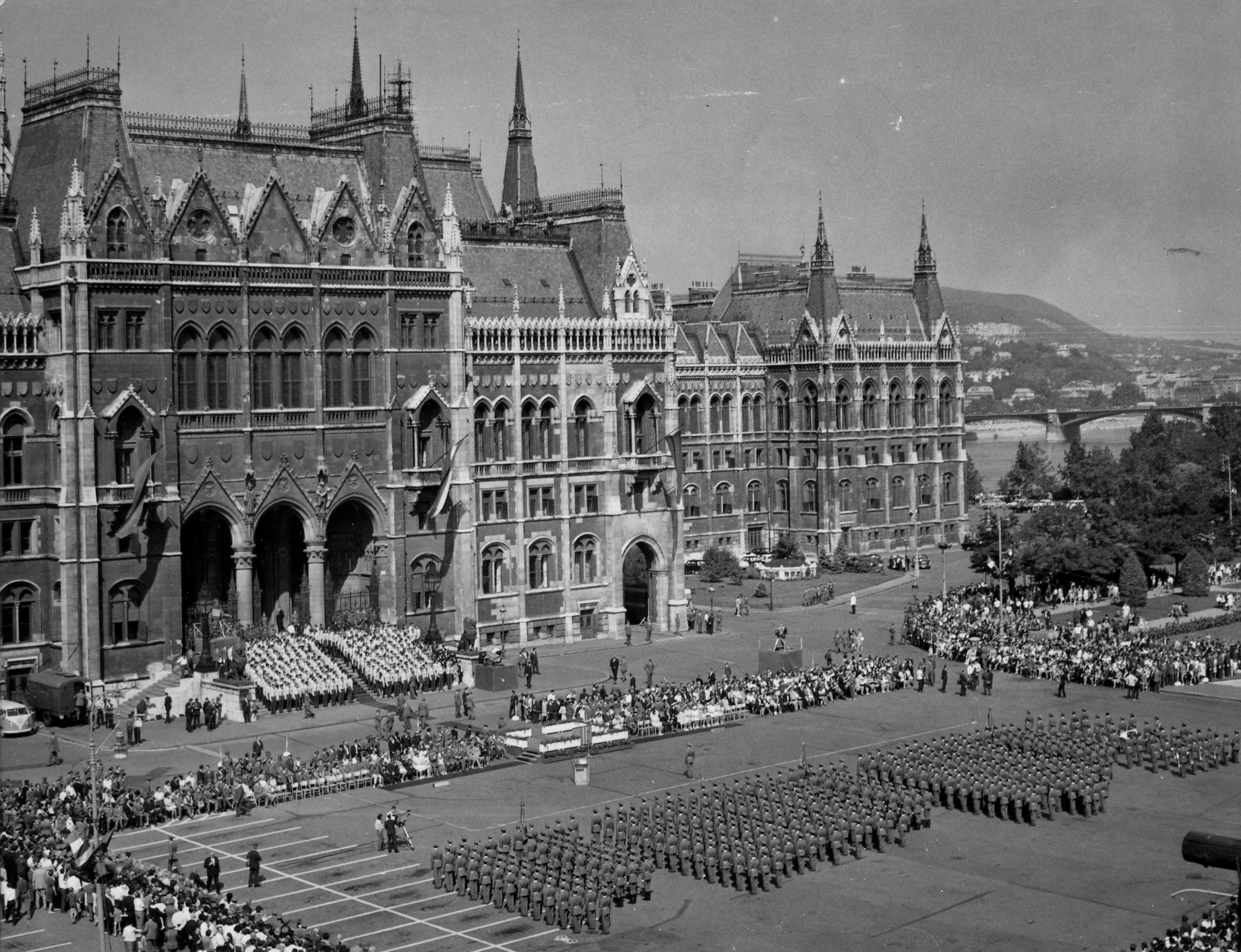
Tisztavatás on Kossuth Square, 1969

Most conscripts were poorly trained, and therefore they were used as a labor force. All of the conscripts had to go through a few weeks of rifle training before they go into workers branches. During the conscription period opinion towards the HPA became very negative and it caused many young men to make excuses on why they should not be drafted (mainly fake medical excuses).
