= AMP-69 =

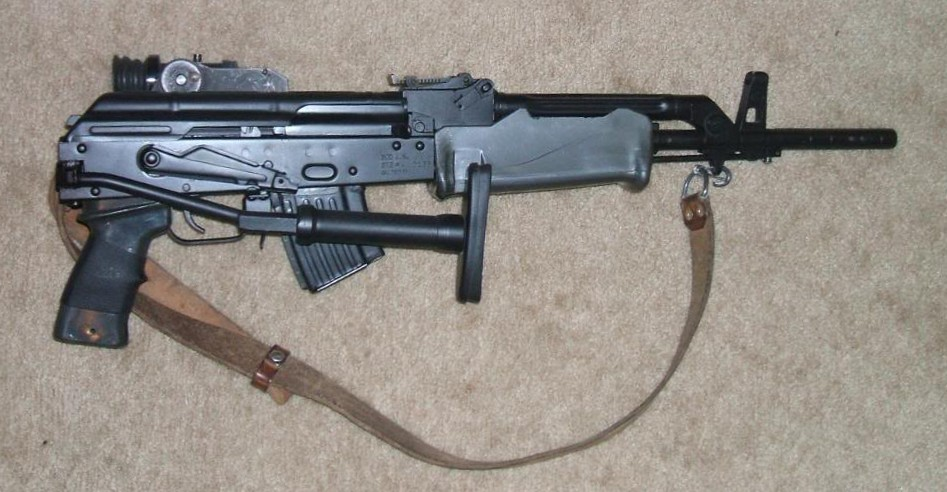
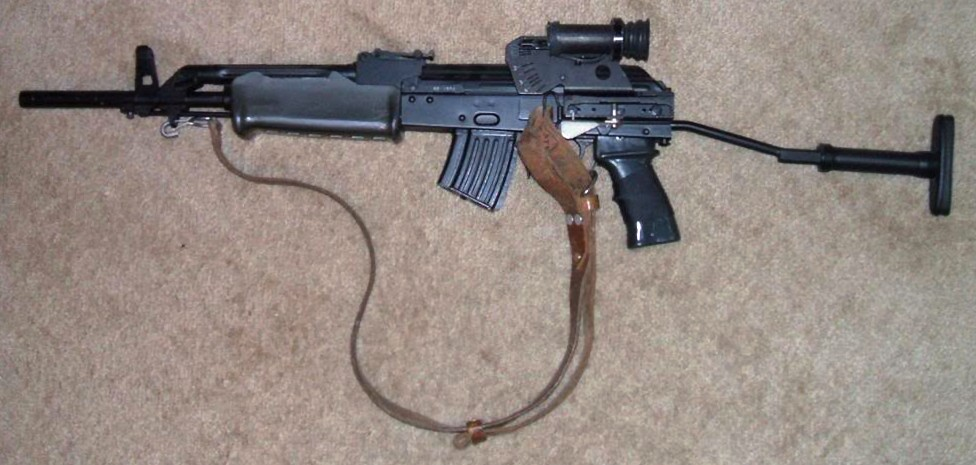
- The AMP-69 shown with a folding stock
- Type: Assault rifle Carbine
- Place of origin: Hungary

Production history
- Manufacturer: Fegyver- és Gépgyár

Specifications
- Cartridge: 7.62×39mm
- Action: Gas-operated
- Muzzle velocity: 731 metres per second (2,400 ft/s)
- Feed system: 10-round detachable box magazine (For rifle grenades), AK-47 magazines (For normal 7.62×39mm ammunition).
- Sights: Tangent sight

The AMP-69 (Hungarian: Automata Módosított Puskagránátos [Gépkarabély] 1969; Automatic Modified Grenade Launcher [assault rifle] 1969) is a selective-fire gas-operated 7.62×39mm assault rifle that was manufactured by Fegyver- és Gépgyár.

== Design ==
While the AMP-69 was modelled after the Kalashnikov rifle, it was specially created to use blank cartridges to launch rifle grenades.

The grenade types were armour piercing (PGK-69), anti-personnel/fragmentation (PGR-69), or tear gas.

== Users ==
- Hungarian People's Republic
  - Hungarian People's Army

== See also ==
- AK-63
- AMD-65
- List of assault rifles
