= KGP =

KGP may refer to:

- Kaingang language, which is identified by the ISO 639-3 code kgp
- Karoo Gemeenskaps Party, a small South African regional political party formed in December 2010
- Kharagpur, West Bengal, an industrial city in India
  - Indian Institute of Technology Kharagpur, or IIT KGP
  - Kharagpur Junction railway station (station code: KGP)
- Polish Police Headquarters (Komenda Główna Policji)
- KGP-9, a Hungarian submachine gun
