= PA63 =

PA 63 can refer to

- FEG PA-63
- Pennsylvania Route 63
