= Tokagypt 58 =

Semi-automatic pistol

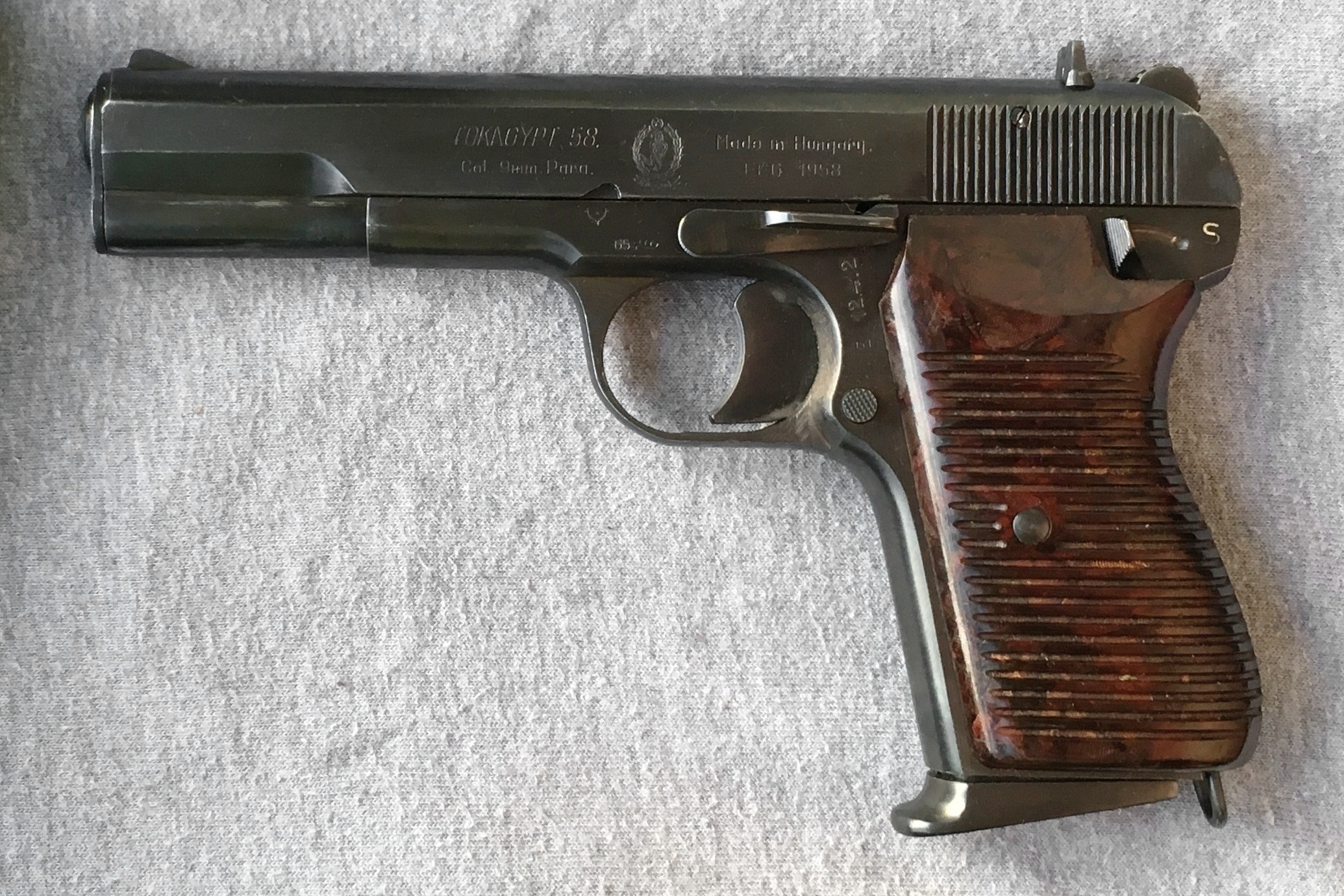
- Type: Semi-automatic pistol
- Place of origin: Hungary

Production history
- Designed: 1958
- Manufacturer: FÉG
- Produced: Fegyver és Gázkészülékgyár (FÉG)

Specifications
- Cartridge: 9×19mm Parabellum
- Action: Short recoil operated
- Feed system: 7-round magazine
- Sights: Blade front, notch rear

The Tokagypt 58 is a Hungarian Tokarev pistol copy intended for export purposes chambered for the 9×19mm Parabellum round.

== History ==
Prior to the Tokagypt, the Fegyver- és Gépgyár (FÉG) produced the M48 pistol (Hungarian: Pisztoly 48 Minta), a local Tokarev copy from 1948 until 1958. About 100,000 were manufactured.

The Tokagypt name comes from a combination of Tokarev and Egypt. FEG was awarded a contract in 1957 to provide 30,000 pistols. The Tokagypt was manufactured in 1958. Egypt cancelled the contract after 13,250 pistols were provided. It has not been made clear on why the contract was cancelled.

The rest of the Tokagypt pistols were sold commercially by FÉG. Some of them went to Germany and the US for commercial sales. At least some of the pistols exported to Germany were marked with the model name Firebird.

== Design ==
Tokagypts differ from the M48 by an external thumb safety, an ergonomic wraparound grip, and a magazine with a finger rest. The pistol uses a 7-round box magazine.

Its construction is primarily of forged and machined steel, with a matte blued finish. The grips are of wrap-around rubber ribbed on the side to improve ergonomics.

== Variants ==
=== TU-90 ===
Chinese Norinco clone of the Tokagypt 58.

== Users ==
- Algeria
- Chad
- Egypt: Egyptian Army.

=== Non-State Actors ===
- Baader-Meinhof Group: Used as one of their pistols when conducting attacks and in training.
- ETA
- Forças Populares 25 de Abril

== Bibliography ==
- Central Intelligence Agency (January 1984). East European Involvement in the International Gray Arms Market (PDF). Freedom of Information Act Electronic Reading Room (Report).
- Dobson, Christopher; Payne, Ronald (1979). The Weapons of Terror: International Terrorism at Work. Springer. ISBN 978-1-349-16111-9.
- Jones, Richard D; Ness, Leland S, eds. (2010). Jane's Infantry Weapons 2010−2011 (36th ed.). Jane's Information Group. ISBN 978-0-7106-2908-1.
- Thompson, Leroy (2022). Soviet Pistols: Tokarev, Makarov, Stechkin and others. Bloomsbury Publishing. ISBN 9781472853493.
