= Pistol Carpați Md. 1974 =

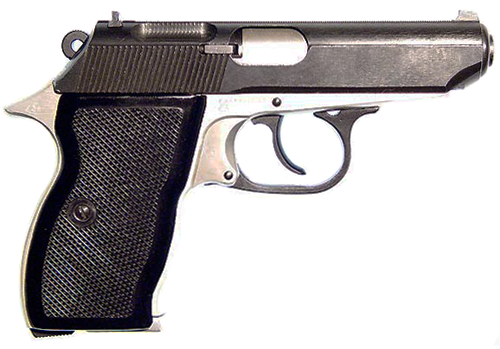
- Type: Semi-automatic pistol
- Place of origin: Romania

Production history
- Manufacturer: Fabrica de Arme Cugir
- Produced: 1974–2020
- Variants: Md. 1974, Md. 1995, Md. 1995 gaz

Specifications
- Mass: 520 grams (18 oz)
- Length: 168 millimetres (6.6 in)
- Barrel length: 91 millimetres (3.6 in)
- Cartridge: 7,65x17mm (.32 ACP)
- Action: Straight blowback
- Rate of fire: 24 RPM
- Muzzle velocity: 285 m/s (935 ft/s)
- Maximum firing range: 50 metres (160 ft)
- Feed system: Magazine, 8 rounds
- Sights: mechanical; fore, blade; rear, fixed notch

The Pistol calibrul 7,65mm Model 1974, also known as Pistolul Carpați, is a series of semi-automatic pistols designed and manufactured by Fabrica de Arme Cugir of Romania.

== Design ==
The Md. 1974 was designed by Întreprinderea Mecanică Cugir, currently Fabrica de Arme Cugir. Its construction is similar to that of the Walther PP/PPK semi-automatic pistol, but it is not a direct copy of it.

The body is made of duraluminium. It works as a double-action weapon on the first shot and as a single-action weapon for subsequent shots. Rounds are automatically fed from the 8-round magazine and the weapon is self-arming. The barrel has four rifling grooves and is coated with a thin layer of chrome.

== Users ==
The Md. 1974 was initially introduced as a side-arm for submachine gun equipped units of the Romanian Army and was the standard issue of the Romanian Police. It's been replaced by the Pistol model 2000 and Glock 17 in active service, but are still in reserve.

The Romanian police replaced the Md. 74 with the Beretta Px4 Storm.
