= Fegyver- és Gépgyár =

Hungarian industrial conglomerate founded in 1891 in Csepel (now part of Budapest)

Fegyver- és Gépgyár (FÉG)
- Type: Private
- Industry: HVAC, general manufacturing, (small arms)
- Founded: 24 February 1891 in Csepel (Budapest)
- Area served: Worldwide
- Products: Heating devices, water boilers and heaters, gas equipment, other HVAC products, (lamps, metalware)
- Parent: MPF Industry Group
- Website: MPF FÉG

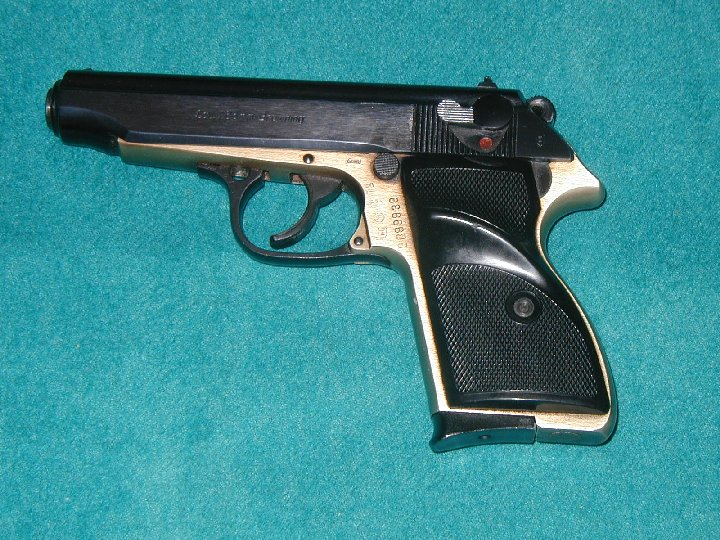
FEG PA-63.

Fegyver- és Gépgyártó Részvénytársaság ("Arms and Machine Manufacturing Company"), known as FÉG, is a Hungarian industrial conglomerate founded on 24 February 1891 in Csepel (now part of Budapest). The company came under the ownership of MPF Industry Group in 2010. It was an important arms manufacturing company before World War II. Since the acquisition, FÉG is one of the biggest exporters of HVAC products to the international markets in the East-Central European heating device industry.

Throughout its history it was renamed several times for various reasons; to Fémáru, Fegyver- és Gépgyár ("Metalware, Arms and Machine Factory") in 1935, to Lámpagyár ("Lamp Factory") in 1946, to Fegyver- és Gázkészülékgyár ("Arms and Gas Equipment Factory") in 1965. Decades later, in post-communist times it was renamed as FÉGARMY Fegyvergyártó Kft. ("FÉGARMY Arms Factory Ltd.").

== 1891-2004 ==
On February 24, 1891, the legal predecessor of the Fegyver és Gépgyár (FÉG) was founded in Budapest. In the beginning, the company produced rifles and pistols for the Austro-Hungarian Army and also exported its products for foreign armies. However, to further increase its revenue, the company also produced pistols and rifles for civilian use on a large scale.

The company became an important arms manufacturer in the country, but it also produced gas equipment, water heaters, lamps, various boilers for steam engines, steam hammers for the steel industry, and miscellaneous metalware. CEO Oszkár Epperlein recognized the growing importance of ICE engines in industrial machinery which may eventually make steam engines obsolete in the near future, thus the company made efforts for manufacturing of industrial ICE engines. The production of Diesel engines started in 1899, when the Hungarian engineer Oszkár Epperlein (1844-1903) and Jenő Böszörményi (1872 - 1957) bought the patent rights of Diesel engines for the FÉG company from Rudolf Diesel.

The production of the Arms Factory increased dramatically between 1914 and 1917. They produced repeating rifles and self-loading pistols in the hundreds of thousands, and millions of cartridges.

Through its history it always fulfilled a crucial role in supplying the Honvédség with small arms, this company also manufactured and exported a variety of semi-automatic pistols and rifles, including the Frommer Stop, P9M, P9RC and the PJK-9HP models (copies of the famous Browning Hi-Power) and the FÉG PA-63 (a Walther PP/PPK clone in 9×18mm Makarov), but currently only self-loading pistols (P9L, P9M, P9R, etc.) and break-barrel air rifles (LG 427, LG 527). In Hungary, the company is also famous for its starting pistols, for example the GRP-9, as well as manufacturing most of the propane water boilers and heaters found in Hungarian houses.

== 2004-present ==
After 2004 many of its traditional export markets were put under embargo and this caused the company to stop its activity connected to the defence industry. At the end of 2010, FÉG almost went bankrupt when HUF 1.7 billion of funds disappeared from the company. MPF Industry Group made an important investment to rescue the company and restarted the production. Since MPF Industry Group's reorganization, FÉG is one of the biggest East-Central European HVAC manufacturers.

== Firearm Products ==
=== Pistols and SMGs ===
- Roth Steyr M.7
- Frommer 1901
- Frommer 1906
- Frommer 1910
- Frommer Stop 1912
- Frommer Lilliput 1921
- Frommer 29M
- FÉG Frommer 37M
- Tokarev 48M
- Walam 48
- Tokagypt 58
- FÉG PA 63
- FÉG R78
- P9RC (clone of Browning Hi power)
- 7.62mm Géppisztoly 48.Minta
- FÉG KGP-9 and KGPF-9

=== Rifles ===
- Mannlicher 1888/90
- Mannlicher 1895
- FÉG 35M
- FÉG 43M
- Mosin Nagant 48M
- SKS
- AK 55
- AKM 63
- AK-63F / AMM
- AK-63D / AMMS
- AK-63MF
- AK-63MA
- AMD 65
- AMP 69
- AMR 69
- NGM 81
- SA 85
- FÉG SA2000 and SA2000M

=== Machine guns ===
- Schwarzlose M.7/12
- Schwarzlose M.7/31
- Solothurn 31.M Golyószóró
- Solothurn 43.M Golyószóró
- KGK
- RPK
- PK
