= AMD-65 =

Hungarian assault rifle

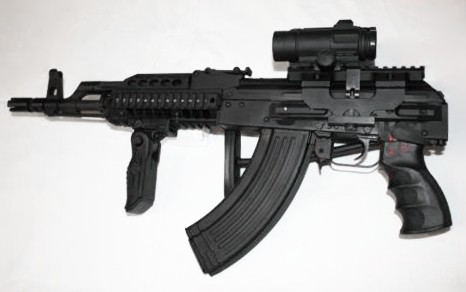
- Type: Assault rifle
- Place of origin: Hungary

Service history
- In service: 1967–present
- Used by: See Users
- Wars: Vietnam War; Rhodesian Bush War; South African Border War; Lebanese Civil War; Angolan Civil War; Croatian War of Independence; Somali Civil War; Second Sudanese Civil War; War in Afghanistan; Iraq War; Russo-Georgian War; Militias-Comando Vermelho conflict; Libyan Civil War; Syrian Civil War; Gaza war

Production history
- Designed: 1965
- Manufacturer: Fegyver- és Gépgyár
- Produced: 1965–1980

Specifications
- Mass: 3.2 kg (7.1 lbs) empty 3.8 kg (8. lb)
- Length: 847 mm (34.4 in) stock extended/ 648 mm (27 in) stock folded
- Barrel length: 317 mm (12.5 in)
- Cartridge: 7.62×39mm
- Action: Gas-operated
- Rate of fire: 650 rounds/min
- Muzzle velocity: 731 m/s (2,398 ft/s)
- Feed system: 20-round detachable box magazine 30-round detachable box magazine Also compatible with 40-round box magazines and 75-round drum magazines from the RPK
- Sights: Iron sights

The AMD-65 (Hungarian: Automata Módosított Deszantfegyver 1965; Automatic Modified Paratrooper Weapon 1965) is a Hungarian-manufactured licensed variant of the selective fire AKM rifle.

== Usage ==
The Hungarian Defence Forces issued the AMD-65 to the armored infantry and paratrooper ("descent") units.

The AMD-65, along with the earlier AKM-63, have been largely replaced in Hungarian military service by the AK-63, a more traditional AKM copy with a lower manufacturing cost.

== Features ==
The AMD-65's operating mechanism does not require a gas expansion chamber at the muzzle, as in the AKS-74U to ensure reliable functioning, but does use a specially designed muzzle brake.

Compared to the birch plywood laminates that are used on the AKM's buttstock, lower and upper handguard, no wood is used in the manufacture of the AMD-65.

The front handguard area is made of perforated sheet metal and typically has a gray plastic vertical foregrip attached to assist in controlling fully automatic fire from this short weapon. In addition, the vertical foregrip has been canted forward to lessen interference with magazine changes.

The vertical foregrip is physically identical to the rear grip, with the former mounted backwards with respect to the rear.

Hungarian manufactured t-nuts used to attach both the forward and rear grips feature a slot cut into the top of the nut, this slot allows the rifle cleaning rod to be inserted through the handguard when the t-nut is used to attach a forward grip.

In Hungarian service, the weapon is mainly used with magazines which can hold 30 rounds (standard magazine) but a special variant is also available, which can only hold 20 rounds. The 30-round magazine does fit with some slight interference and it can be also fitted with the 40-round magazine.

== Users ==
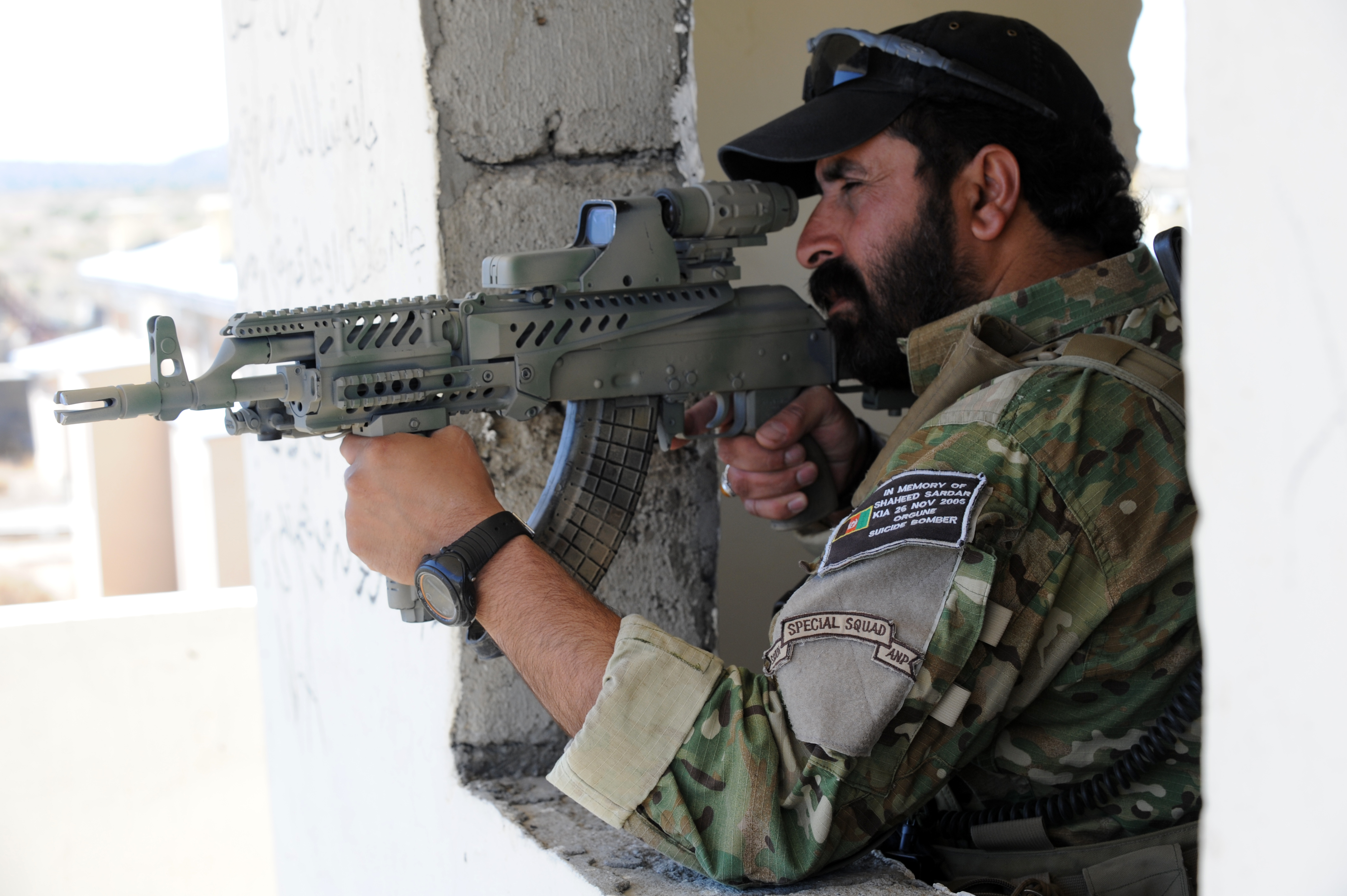
An Afghan National Police officer in September 2010, equipped with a modified AMD-65 with an attached hybrid telescopic sight that has the EOTech Holographic weapon sight.

- Afghanistan
  - Afghan National Police.
- Georgia
  - 1186 rifles were delivered in 2008.
- Hungary
- Libya
- Morocco
  - Royal Moroccan Gendarmerie.
- Slovenia
- Sudan
- South Sudan
  - Sudan People's Liberation Army
- Syria
- Tanzania
- United States
  - American special forces such as the Army Green Berets in Vietnam and Afghanistan.
- Vietnam
  - Used during Vietnam War.

=== Non-state users ===
- Arakan Rohingya Salvation Army
- Hamas
- Palestine Liberation Organization (PLO)

== Availability in the United States ==
Many AMD-65s were exported to the United States and sold in kit form following the destruction of the receiver, which legally rendered the weapon to the status of a non-firearm. In order to be legally reassembled, the parts must be rebuilt on a US-made receiver which lacks the provisions for certain parts which would make it capable of automatic fire.

In its original short-barreled form the completed weapon is regulated as a "short-barreled rifle" (SBR) under the National Firearms Act in the United States. The addition of a permanently attached barrel extension of the correct length will render the firearm legal for general use, subject to additional stipulations. These include a certain number of US-made parts in the finished rifle.

This count is required in order to comply with U.S.C. 922 (r); a statute which regulates imported rifles with certain features that the BATFE defines as not being suitable for sporting purposes.

Some individuals choose to build AMD-65s without a buttstock, thus legally classifying the resulting new firearm as a "pistol" and eliminating the need for a muzzle extension (as well as the parts for 922r compliance).

However, this route requires the removal of the forward grip, unless the gun is registered under the NFA as an "AOW" (any other weapon) or has an overall length greater than 26 inches (660 mm).

In summary, the semi-automatic version of the AMD-65, when re-manufactured as detailed above, is now legal for civilian use in most states.

== Gallery ==
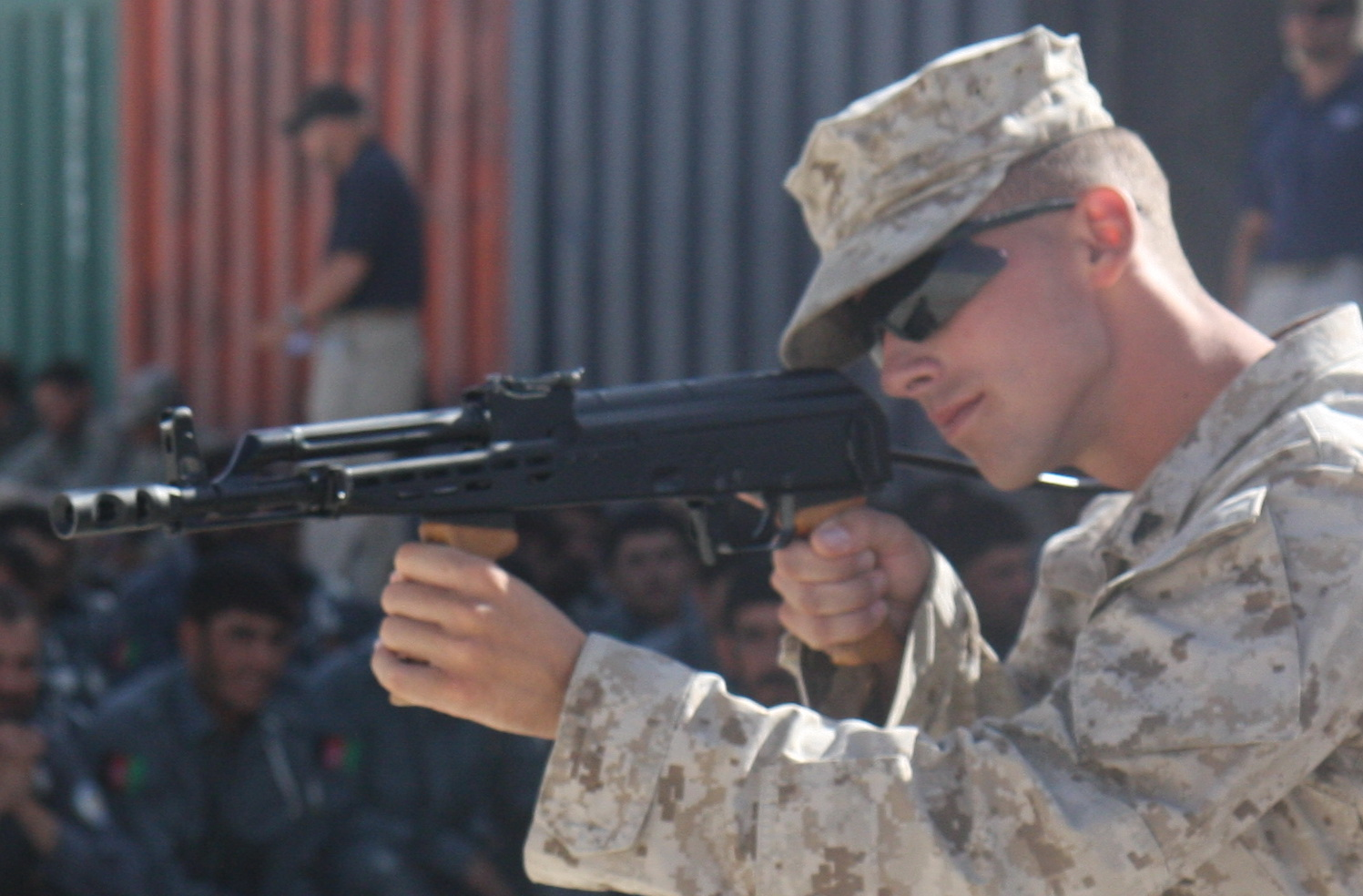
U.S. Marine Corps Cpl. Cory J. Becker, of Golf Company, 2nd Battalion, 7th Marine Regiment, shows Afghan National Police recruits different firing positions using an AMD-65 assault rifle on Lashkar Gah, Afghanistan, June 3, 2008.

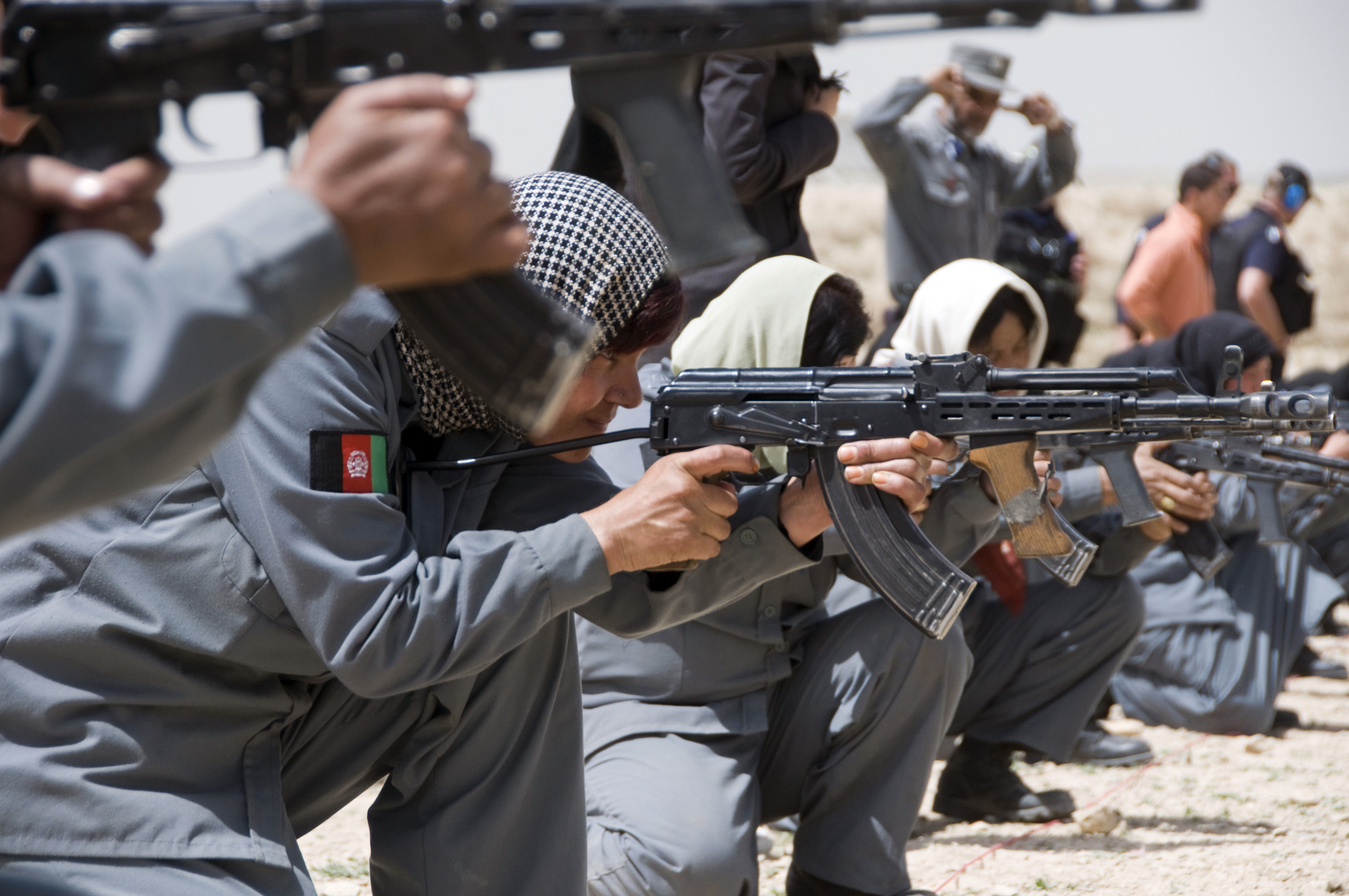
Afghan National Police women qualify on the AMD-65 rifle during the tactical training program portion of the police basic training course at Kabul Military Training Center, April 13, 2010.

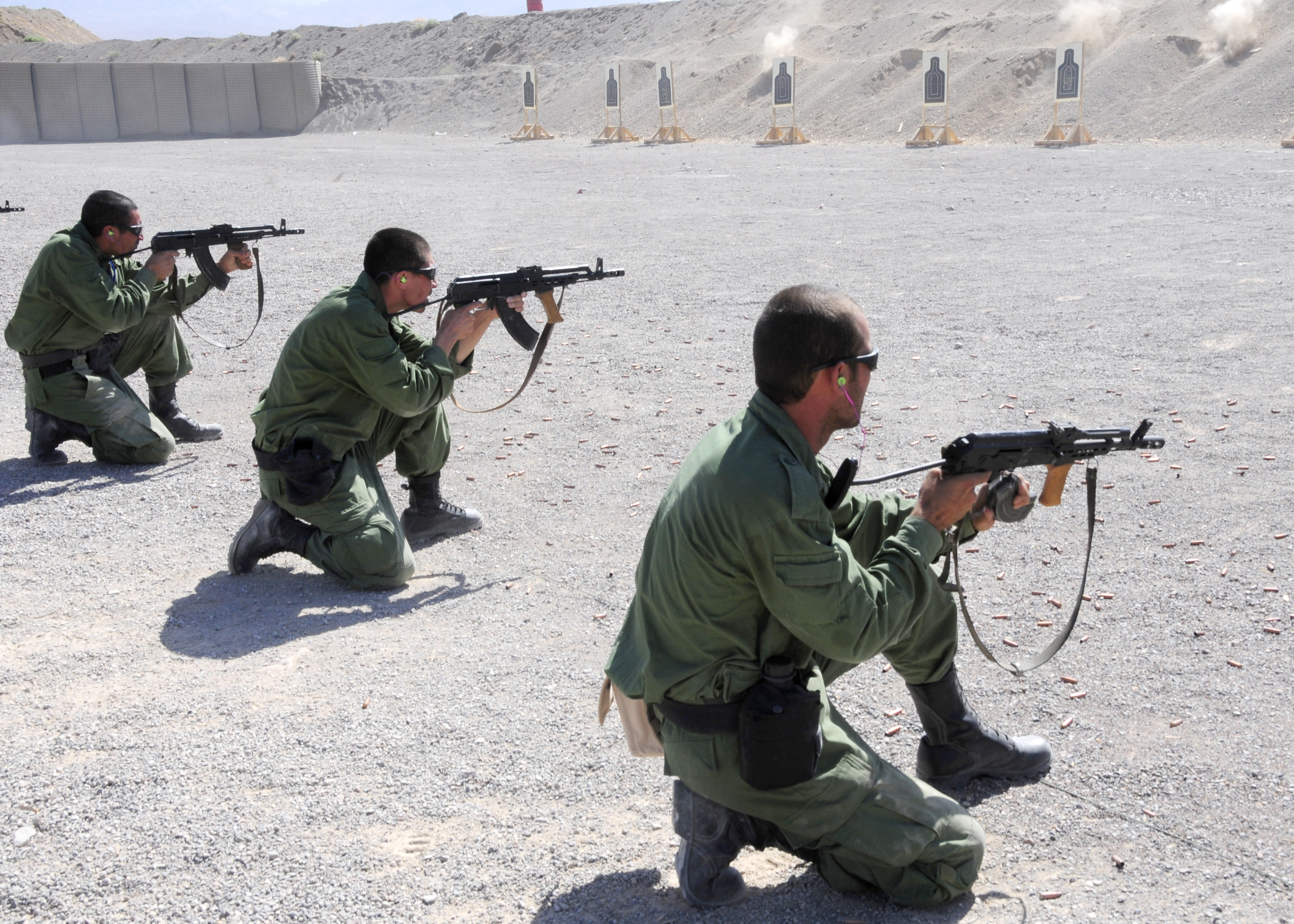
A group of Afghan National Police (ANP) train on the shooting range with the AMD-65 at Camp Shouz in Herat Province of Afghanistan.

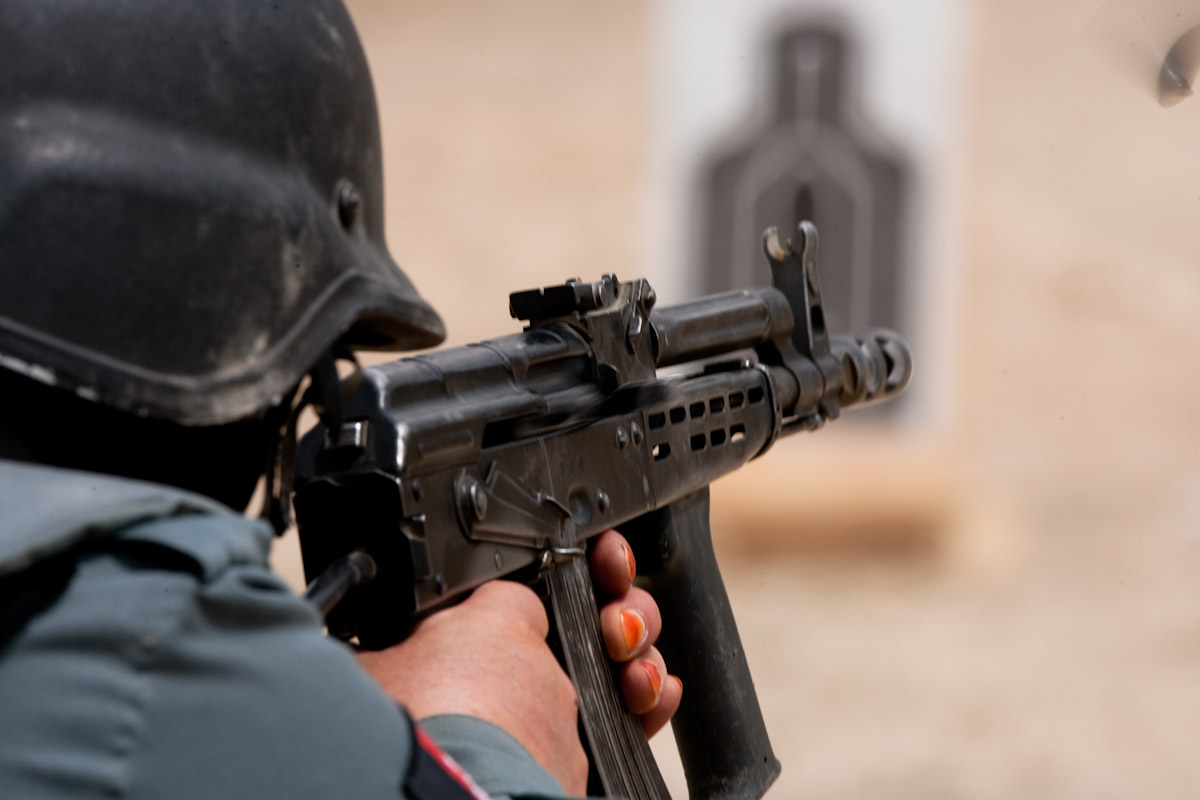
An Afghan National Police officer training with shooting using an AMD-65, in July 2010.

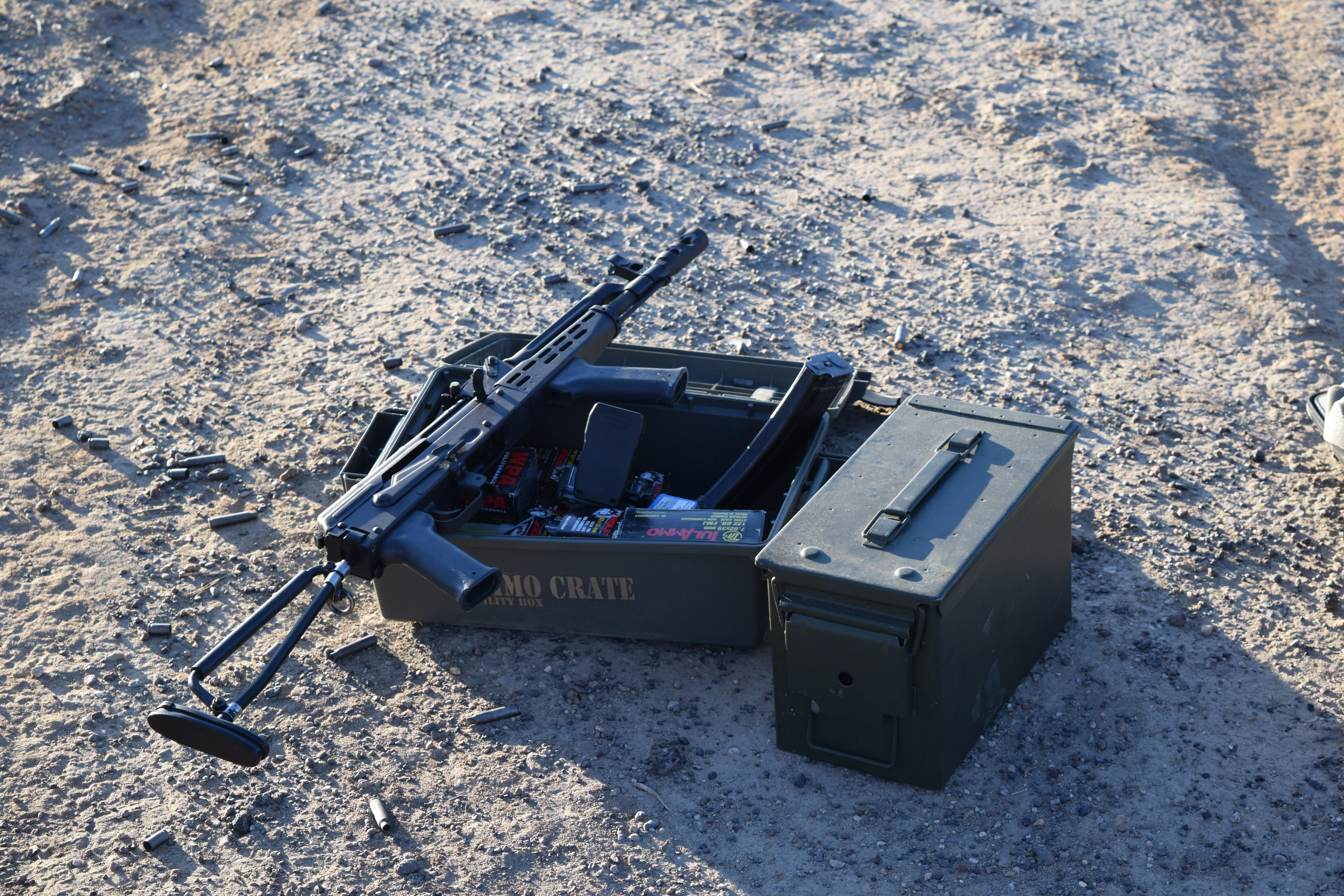
Select fire AMD-65

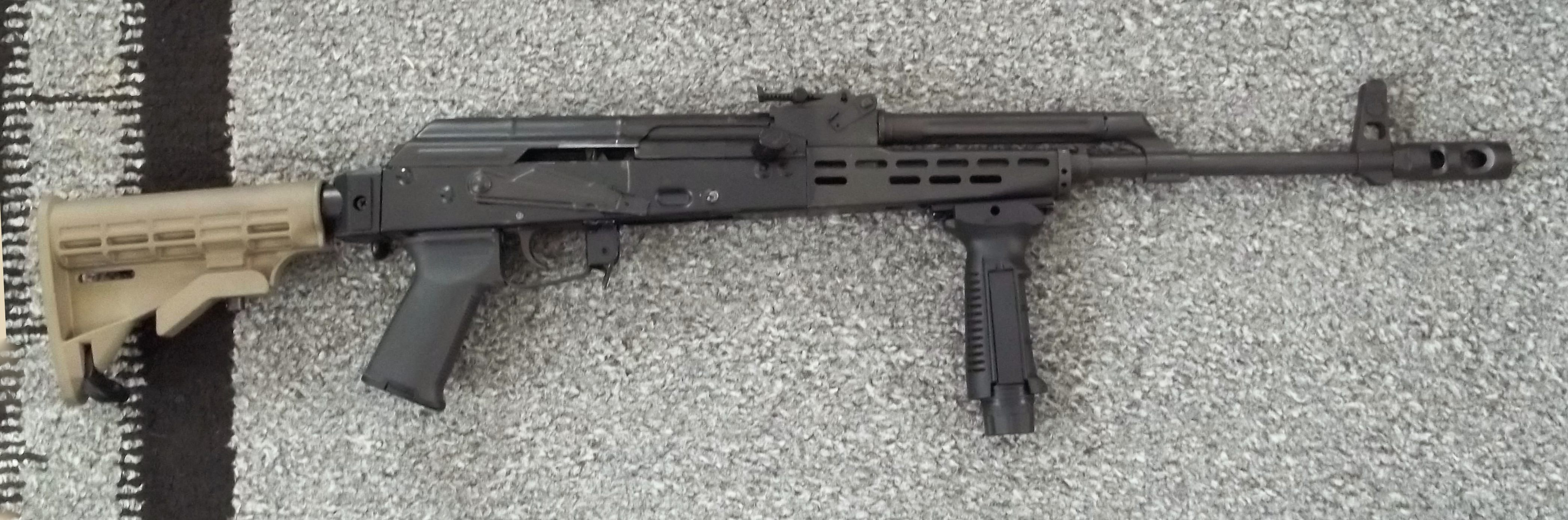
Modernized Custom Built AMD-65

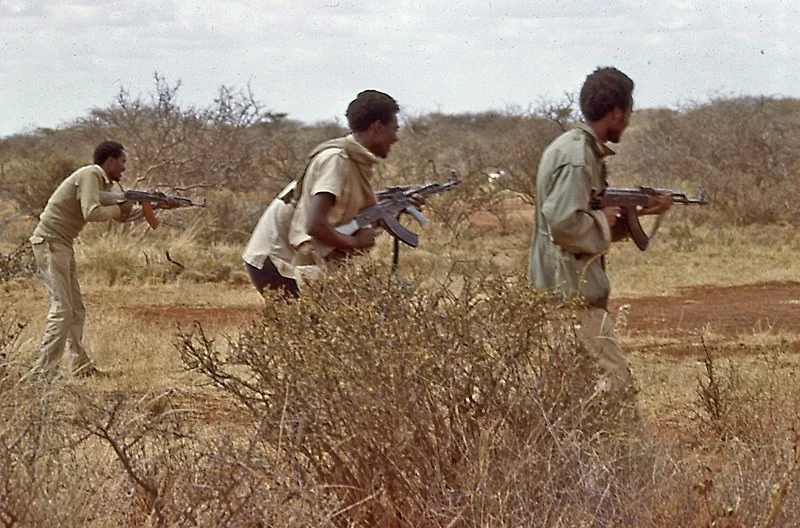
WSLF militant on center with AKM-63.

== See also ==
- AK-63
- AMP-69
- IMI Galil
- List of assault rifles
