= Walther PP =

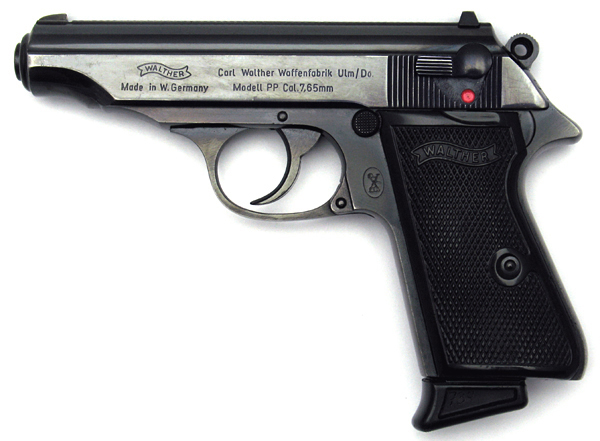
- Original Walther PP pistol
- Type: Semi-automatic pistol
- Place of origin: Weimar Republic

Service history
- In service: 1929–present
- Used by: See Users
- Wars: Chaco War; Spanish Civil War; World War II; Cold War; The Troubles; Vietnam War; Rhodesian Bush War; Lebanese Civil War; Gulf War; Iraq War (Operation Telic); Syrian Civil War

Production history
- Designer: Carl Walther Waffenfabrik
- Designed: 1929
- Manufacturer: Carl Walther GmbH Sportwaffen
- Produced: 1929–2025
- Variants: See Variants

Specifications
- Mass: 675 g (23.8 oz) (.22 LR); 660 g (23 oz) (.32 ACP); 665 g (23.5 oz) (.380 ACP); 850 g (30 oz) (9×18mm Ultra)
- Length: 170 mm (6.7 in)
- Barrel length: 98 mm (3.9 in)
- Width: 30 mm (1.2 in)
- Height: 109 mm (4.3 in)
- Cartridge: 9×18mm Ultra; .22 Long Rifle; .25 ACP; .32 ACP; .380 ACP
- Action: Straight blowback
- Muzzle velocity: 305 m/s (1,000.7 ft/s) (.22 LR); 320 m/s (1,049.9 ft/s) (.32 ACP); 256 m/s (840 ft/s) (.380 ACP); 320 m/s (1,050 ft/s) (9×18mm Ultra)
- Feed system: Magazine capacity: 10 (.22 LR); 8 (.32 ACP); 7 (.380 ACP and 9×18mm Ultra)
- Sights: Fixed iron sights, rear notch and front blade

The Walther PP (German: Polizeipistole — lit. "police pistol") series pistols are blowback-operated semi-automatic pistols, developed by the German arms manufacturer Carl Walther GmbH Sportwaffen.

== Design ==
The Walther PP series feature an exposed hammer, a double-action trigger mechanism, a single-column magazine, and a fixed barrel that also acts as the guide rod for the recoil spring.

The PP series incorporates a number of design features that were rare at the time it was first produced, but were in common usage by the late 20th Century. These include double-to single-action operation, a rounded hammer spur to avoid snagging when drawing the pistol, a loaded chamber indicator and a safety, which, when activated, decocks the pistol.

== Variants ==
The Walther PP series includes the Walther PP, PPK, PPK/S, and PPK/E models.

=== PP ===
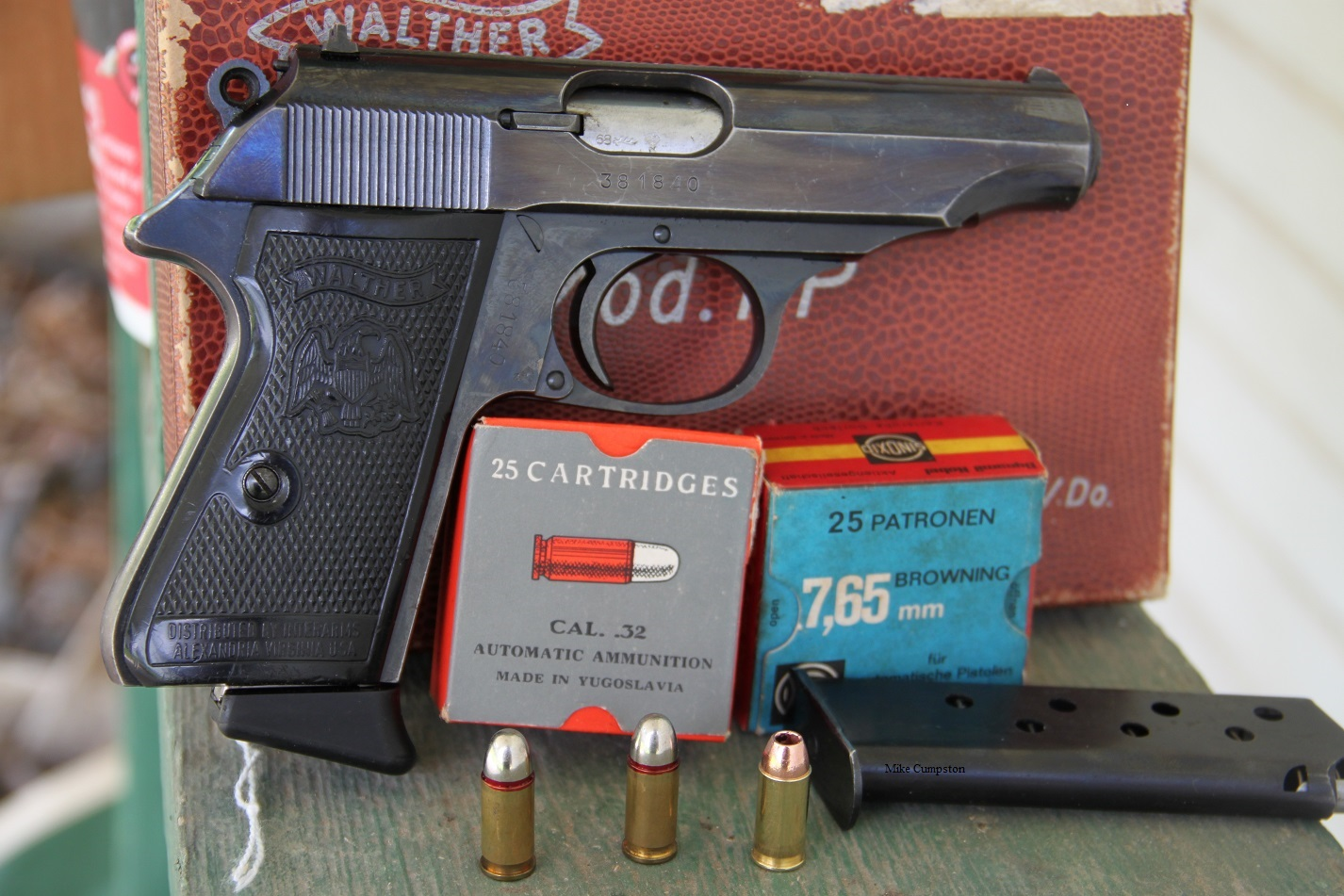
Walther PP .32 made in Germany in 1968

The original PP was released in 1929 and was, in 2025, re-introduced with modern enhancements. It was designed for police use and was used by police forces in Europe in the 1930s and later. The semi-automatic pistol operated using a simple blowback action. The PP was designed with several safety features, some of them innovative, including an automatic hammer block, a combination safety/decocker and a loaded chamber indicator.

=== PPK ===
The most common variant is the Walther PPK, a smaller version of the PP with a shorter grip, barrel and frame, and reduced magazine capacity. A new, two-piece wrap-around grip panel construction was used to conceal the exposed back strap. The smaller size made it more concealable than the original PP and hence better suited to plain-clothes or undercover work. It was released in 1931. "PPK" is an abbreviation for Polizeipistole Kriminal (literally "police pistol criminal"), referring to the Kriminalamt crime investigation office. While the K is often mistakenly assumed to stand for kurz (German for "short"), as the variant has a shorter barrel and frame, Walther used the name "Kriminal" in early advertising brochures and the 1937 GECO German catalog.

=== PPK/S ===
The PPK/S was developed following the enactment of the Gun Control Act of 1968 (GCA68) in the United States, the pistol's largest market. One of the provisions of GCA68 banned the importation of pistols and revolvers not meeting certain requirements of length, weight, and other "sporting" features into the United States. The PPK failed the "Import Points" test of the GCA68 by a single point. Walther addressed this situation by combining the PP's frame with the PPK's barrel and slide to create a pistol that weighed slightly more than the PPK. The additional weight of the PPK/S compared to the PPK was sufficient to provide the extra needed import points.

Because U.S. law allowed domestic production (as opposed to importation) of the PPK, manufacture began under license in the U.S. in 1983; this version was distributed by Interarms. The version currently manufactured by Walther Arms in Fort Smith, Arkansas has been modified (by Smith & Wesson) by incorporating a longer grip tang (S&W calls it "extended beaver tail"), better protecting the shooter from slide bite.

The PPK/S is made of stainless steel. There are also blued examples.

The PPK/S differs from the PPK as follows:

- Overall height: 104 mm (4.1 in) vs. 100 mm (3.9 in)
- Weight: the PPK/S weighs 51 g (1.8 oz) more than the PPK
- The PPK/S magazine holds one additional round, in both calibers.

The PPK/S and the PPK are offered in the following calibers: .32 ACP (with a capacity of 7 rounds for the PPK and 8 rounds for the PPK/S) or .380 ACP (6 rounds for the PPK and 7 for the PPK/S). The PPK/S is also offered in .22 LR with a capacity of 10 rounds.

=== PPK-L ===
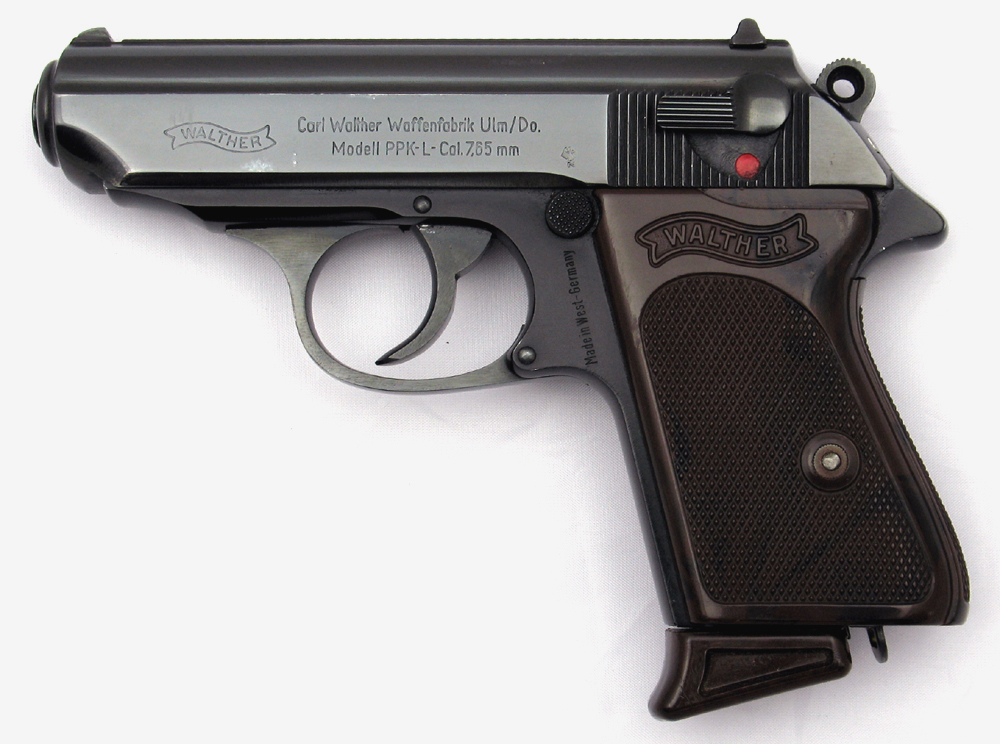
A Walther PPK-L manufactured in 1966

In the 1960s, Walther produced the PPK-L, which was a lightweight variant of the PPK. The PPK-L differed from the standard, all steel PPK in that it had an aluminium alloy frame. These were only chambered in 7.65mm Browning (.32 ACP) and .22 LR because of the increase in felt recoil from the lighter weight of the gun.

All other features of the postwar production PPK (brown plastic grips with Walther banner, high polished blue finish, lanyard loop, loaded chamber indicator, 7+1 magazine capacity and overall length) were the same on the PPK-L.

=== PP Super ===
First marketed in 1972, this was an all-steel variant of the PP chambered for the 9×18mm Ultra cartridge. Designed as a police service pistol, it was a blowback operated, double-action pistol with an external slide-stop lever and a firing-pin safety. A manual decocker lever was on the left side of the slide; when pushed down, it locked the firing pin and released the hammer.

When the 9×19mm Parabellum was chosen as the standard service round by most of the German police forces, the experimental 9mm Ultra round fell into disuse. Only about 2,000 PP Super pistols were sold to German police forces in the 1970s, and lack of sales caused Walther to withdraw the PP Super from their catalogue in 1979.

=== PPK/E ===
Walther PPK/E
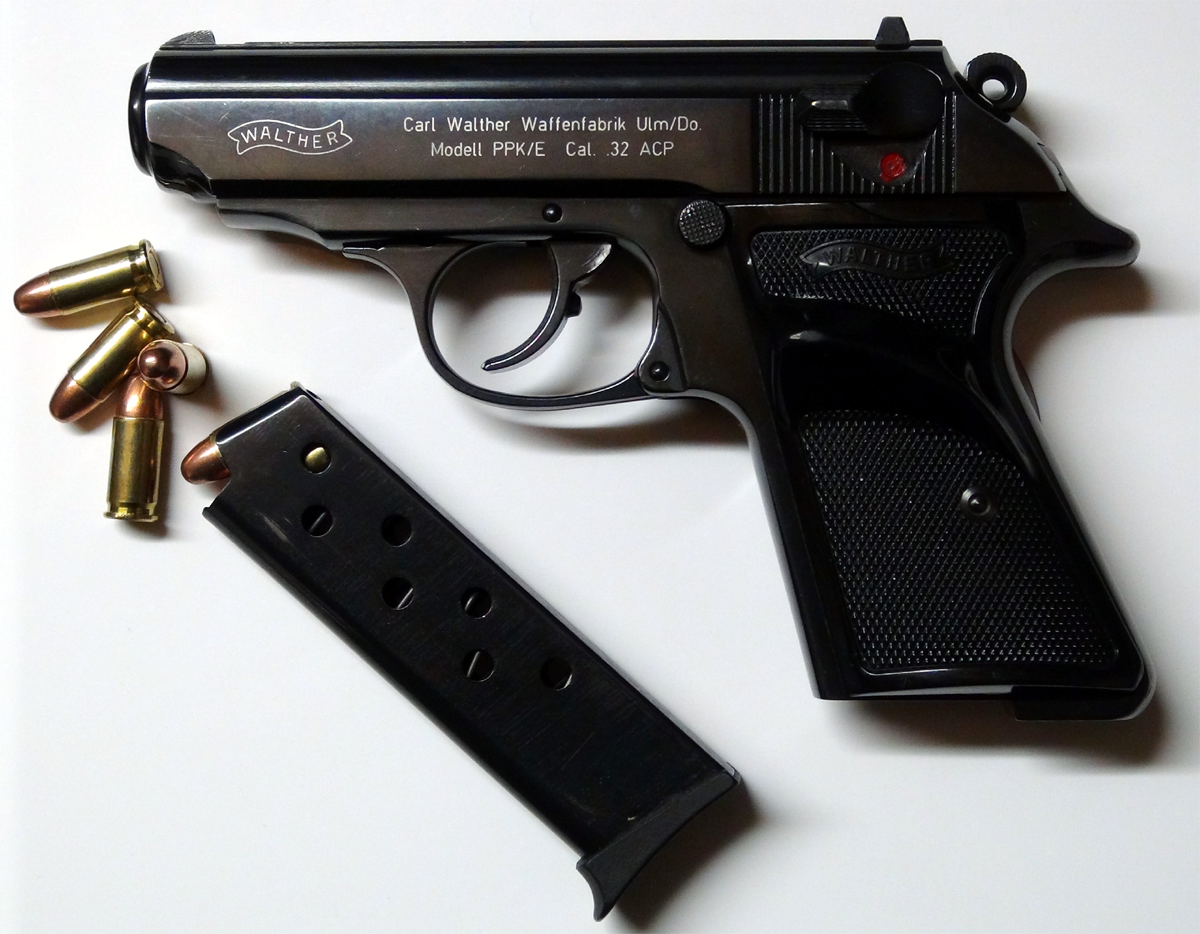
- Type: Semi-automatic pistol
- Place of origin: Hungary

Production history
- Designed: 2000
- Manufacturer: Fegyver- és Gépgyár

Specifications
- Length: 155 mm (6.1 in)
- Barrel length: 83 mm (3.3 in)
- Width: 30 mm (1.2 in)
- Height: 113 mm (4.4 in)
- Cartridge: .22 LR, .32 ACP, and .380 ACP
- Action: Straight blowback
- Sights: Fixed iron sights, rear notch and front blade

At the 2000 Internationale Waffen-Ausstellung (IWA—International Weapons Exhibition) in Nuremberg, Walther announced a new PPK variant designated as the PPK/E. The PPK/E resembles the PPK/S and has a blue steel finish; it is manufactured under license by FEG in Hungary. Despite the resemblance between the two, certain PP-PPK-PPK/S parts, such as magazines, are not interchangeable with the PPK/E. Official factory photographs do not refer to the pistol's Hungarian origins. Instead, the traditional Walther legend ("Carl Walther Waffenfabrik Ulm/Do.") is stamped on the left side of the slide. The PPK/E is offered in .22 LR, .32 ACP, and .380 ACP calibers.

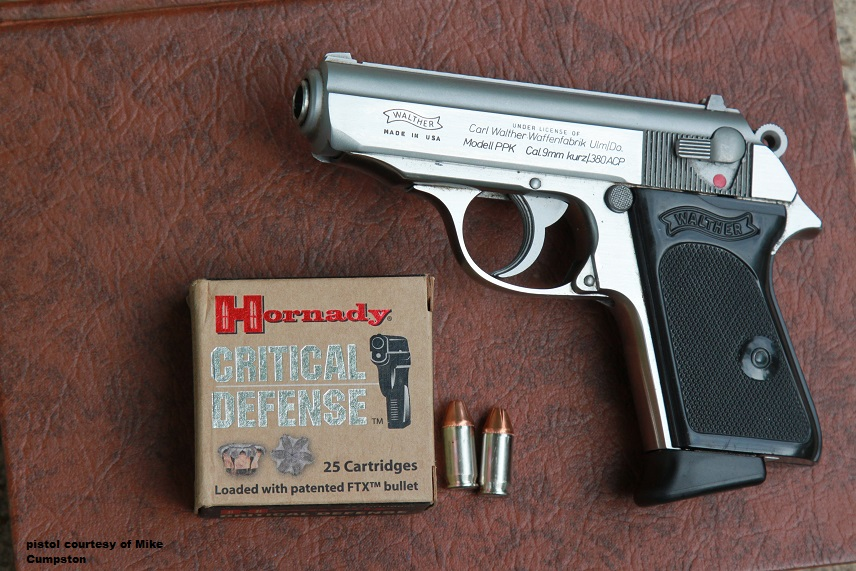
Stainless steel PPK made under license by Ranger Arms

== Production ==
=== Walther ===
Walther's original factory was located in Zella-Mehlis in the state of Thuringia. As that part of Germany was occupied by the Soviet Union following World War II, Walther fled to West Germany, where they established a new factory in Ulm.

=== Manurhin ===
For several years following the war, the Allied powers forbade any manufacture of weapons in Germany. As a result, in 1952, Walther licensed production of the PP series pistols to a French company, Manufacture de Machines du Haut-Rhin, also known as Manurhin. Manurhin made the parts but the pistol was assembled either at Saint-Étienne arsenal (marked "Made in France") or by Walther in Ulm (marked "Made in West Germany" and having German proof-marks). The French company continued to manufacture the PP series until 1986.

=== In the United States ===
In 1978, Ranger Manufacturing of Gadsden, Alabama was licensed to manufacture the PPK and PPK/S; this version was distributed by Interarms of Alexandria, Virginia. Ranger made versions of the PPK/S in both blued and stainless steel and chambered in .380 ACP and only made copies chambered in .32 ACP from 1997 to 1999. This license was eventually canceled in 1999.

Walther USA of Springfield, Massachusetts briefly made PPKs and PPK/Ss directly through Black Creek Manufacturing from 1999 to 2001. From 2002, Smith & Wesson (S&W) began manufacturing the PPK and PPK/S under license at their plant in Houlton, Maine until 2013. In February 2009, S&W issued a recall for PPKs it manufactured for a defect in the hammer block safety.

In 2018, Walther Arms began producing them again at their new United States manufacturing plant in Fort Smith, Arkansas. The PP, PPK, & PPK/S line of firearms ended production at the Fort Smith plant in November 2025.

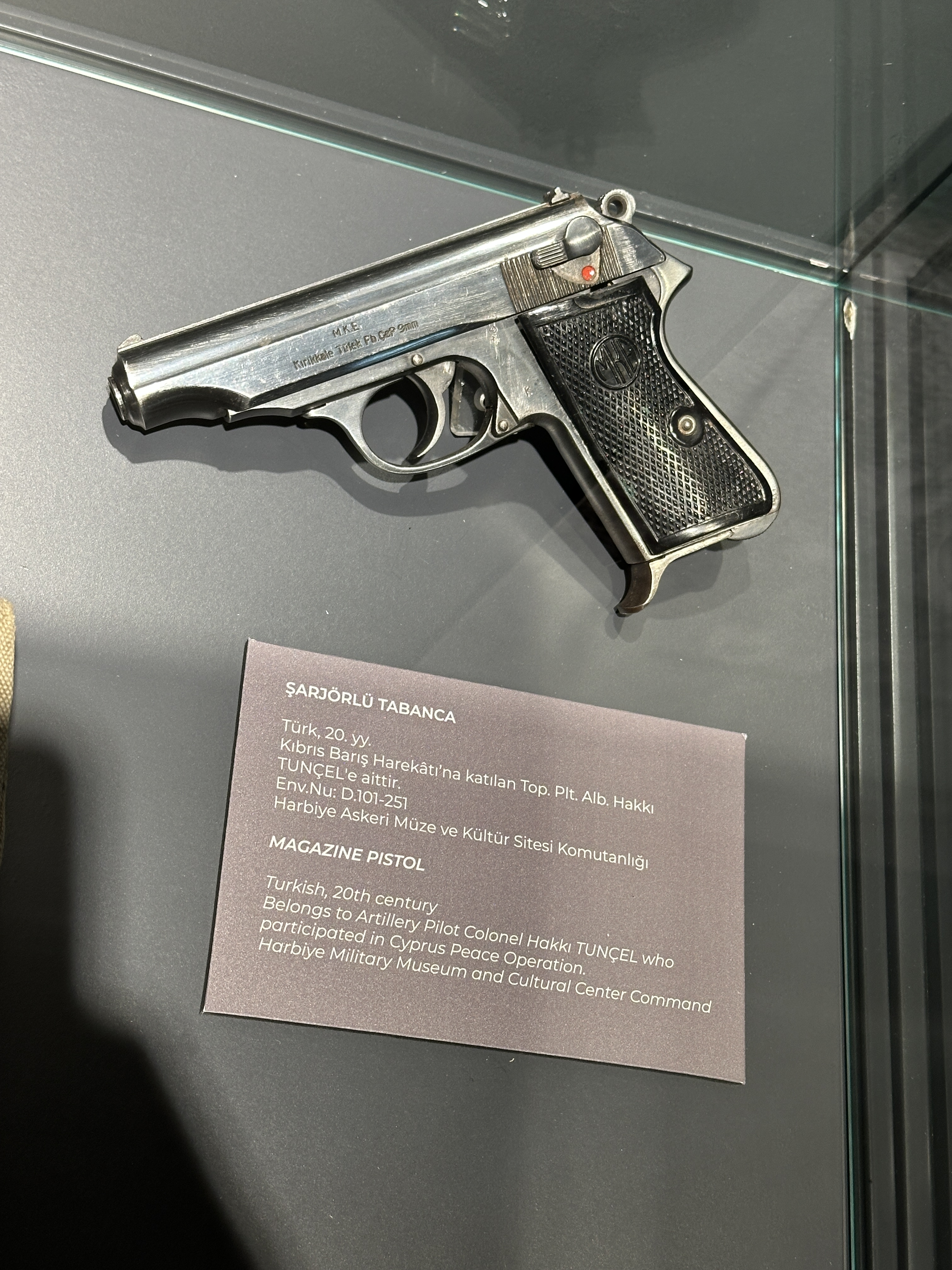
A pistol produced by MKE Kırıkkale, inspired by the Walther PP.

=== In other countries ===
The PPK and PP are still manufactured by Walther and have been widely copied. The Walther PP design inspired other pistols, among them the Soviet Makarov, the Hungarian FEG PA-63, the Czechoslovak Vz. 50, the American Accu-Tek AT-380 II, and the Argentine Bersa Thunder 380.

Close copies were produced by the following countries:

Model	Origin	Reference
Type 52	China	
P1001-0	East Germany	
WALAM 48	Hungary	
Model 74	Iraq	
MKE Kirikkale	Turkey	
Pistol Carpați Md. 1974	Romania	
DH380/DP52	South Korea	

== Adoption ==
The PP and the PPK were among the world's first successful double action semi-automatic pistols.

=== Warfare ===
During World War II, they were issued to the German military, including the Luftwaffe, as well as the uniformed Ordnungspolizei, plainclothes detectives of the Kriminalpolizei and Nazi Party officials. The PP and PPK variants were privately bought and used by members of the Latvian Aizsargi national guard. The PPK was used by the MACVSOG recon skydiver team, equipped with detachable suppressor.

==== L66A1 ====
In 1974, the British Royal Army Ordnance Corps purchased some thousand .22LR caliber Walther PP pistols for members of the Ulster Defence Regiment.

They were issued as sidearms to be carried by off duty soldiers for personal protection during The Troubles. They had military markings unlike standard Walther PPs. They had black plastic grips and were parkerized. In the 1980s, the guns were coated with a lacquer called Suncorite, which was later found to be toxic and is no longer in use.

=== Law enforcement ===
The PP and PPK were popular with police forces, alongside their specialised departments worldwide. Australia, Austria, Brazil, Denmark, Sweden, the United Kingdom and the United States, alongside other countries, have issued PP and PPK as their officers' sidearms.

A PPK carried by Princess Anne's personal police officer James W. Beaton jammed during a kidnapping attempt on the princess and her husband on 20 March 1974.

The Kentucky State Police issued the stainless PPK/S as a backup gun with the agency logo engraved on the slide.

=== Others ===
A Walther PPK .32 was used by Kim Jae-gyu to kill South Korean leader Park Chung Hee on 26 October 1979.

Adolf Hitler was alleged to have used his personal Walther PPK to commit suicide in the Führerbunker on 30 April 1945.

== Users ==
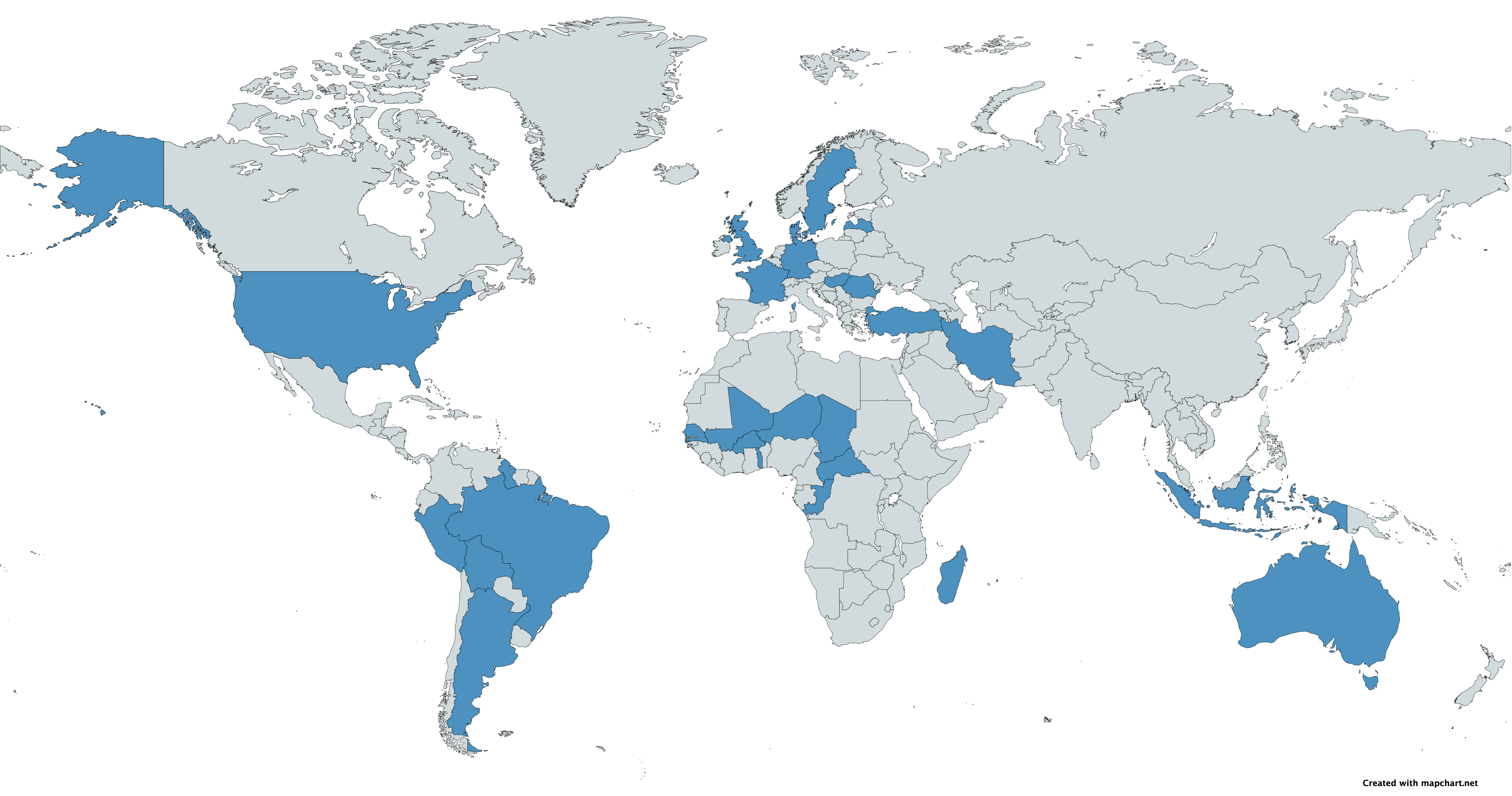
A map with nations who use the Walther PP in blue

- Bolivia
- Burkina Faso
- Central African Republic
- Chad
- Republic of the Congo
- Guyana
- Indonesia
- Iran
- Madagascar
- Mali
- Mauritius
- Germany
- Niger
- Peru
- Senegal
- Seychelles
- Togo
- United Kingdom

=== Former users ===
- Australia — Walther PPK pistols in .22 LR and .32 ACP were formerly used by Australian police for undercover and surveillance duties.
- Austria — Walther PP and PPK pistols were used by the Austrian Armed Forces and police.
- Argentina — Walther PPK pistols in 7.65mm Browning were used by Argentine naval special forces (Comandos Anfibios).
- Brazil — The Walther PP in .380 ACP was adopted by the São Paulo Public Force in 1936. A 7.65mm version was also issued to senior naval officers in 1953.
- Denmark — The Danish police used Walther PPK pistols chambered in 7.65mm Browning until 1998.
- East Germany — Produced the P1001-0, a domestically manufactured copy of the Walther PP, during the Cold War.
- Nazi Germany — Walther PP and PPK pistols were issued to Heer, Luftwaffe, Ordnungspolizei and Kriminalpolizei Officers during the Second World War. They were also carried by Nazi Party officials.
- Latvia — Walther PP and PPK pistols were privately purchased and used by members of the Aizsargi national guard. Additional examples were captured following the Soviet occupation in 1940.
- Soviet Union — Small batches of Walther PP and Walther PPK pistols chambered in 7.65×17mm Browning (.32 ACP) and 6.35×15.5mm Browning (.25 ACP) were issued to NKVD officers in the mid-1930s. Additional pistols were captured during the Soviet annexation of Latvia in 1940. Captured German-made pistols were also used during the Second World War.
- Sweden — Walther PP pistols were supplied for Swedish police use. Some Swedish police pistols were manufactured under licence by the French company Manurhin.
- Turkey — Manufactured the MKE Kırıkkale pistol, a domestically produced copy based on the Walther PP design.
- Romania — Manufactured the Carpați Md. 1974 pistol, based on the Walther PP design, for Romanian security services.
- United States — The Walther PPK/S was used as a backup handgun by the Kentucky State Police. Walther PPK pistols were also used by US military personnel, including members of MACV-SOG during the Vietnam War.

== Cultural references ==
The fictional secret agent James Bond uses a Walther PPK in many of the novels, films and video games. Ian Fleming's choice of Bond's weapon directly influenced the popularity and notoriety of the PPK. Fleming had given Bond a .25 Beretta 418 pistol in early novels but switched to the PPK in Dr. No (1958) on the advice of firearms expert Geoffrey Boothroyd. Although referred to as a PPK in the film adaption of 1962, the actual gun carried by actor Sean Connery was a Walther PP. Actor Jack Lord, who played Felix Leiter in Dr. No, was presented with a gold-plated PPK with ivory handgrips, given to him by his friend Elvis Presley. Presley owned a silver-finish PPK, inscribed "TCB" ("taking care of business"). It was renamed to PP7 in the 1997 video game GoldenEye 007.

== See also ==
- Bersa Thunder 380
- FEG PA-63
