= KGP-9 =

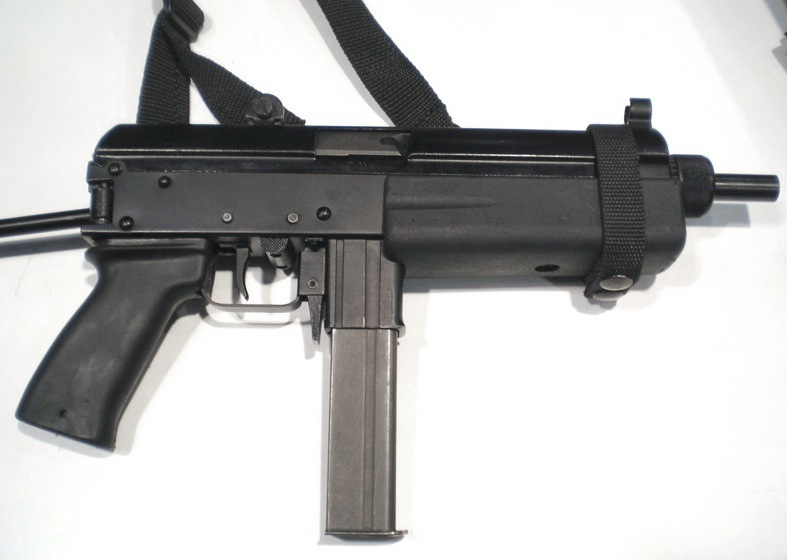
- Type: Submachine gun
- Place of origin: Hungary

Service history
- Used by: Hungarian military and prison guard

Production history
- Designer: Zoltán Horváth
- Designed: 1986-1997
- Manufacturer: Fegyver- és Gépgyár
- Produced: 2000-present

Specifications
- Mass: 2.87kg (empty)
- Length: 381 mm (stock folded), 642mm (unfolded)
- Width: 84mm (stock folded), 68mm (unfolded)
- Height: 217mm with magazine
- Cartridge: 9×19mm Parabellum
- Caliber: 9mm
- Action: Blowback
- Rate of fire: 900-1,100 rounds/min
- Muzzle velocity: 390 m/s w/124gr service ammunition
- Maximum firing range: 350 m
- Feed system: 25-round box magazine
- Sights: U-notch rear flip sight, 50m & 150m, windage adjustable. Front post sight.

The KGP-9 is a Hungarian submachine gun used by Hungary's military forces and prison guards. Development started in 1986 when the head of the Hungarian Institute for Military Technology, János Egerszegi, drafted a proposal for a new sub-machine gun in 9mm Parabellum rather than 9x18 Makarov, the latter caliber being disliked by the counter-terrorist units of the Hungarian police. The most promising design was submitted by Fegyver- és Gépgyár and was developed by Zoltán Horváth. Weapon trials began in 1988 but the socioeconomic upheavals of 1989 (fall of the Soviet Union and the Hungarian People's Republic) caused the project to stall for a few years. Unlike the 1988 trials, field trials in 1993 resulted in several failure to feed malfunctions, which FÉG blamed on poor quality ammunition made by MFS. The officers participating in the trial disputed this, stating that the same ammunition feed reliably from UZI sub-machine guns and the IWI Jericho 941 pistol. Testers also disliked the folding stock and safety.

Despite these issues, the project continued with more prototypes being made ready for trials in 1996. These guns had even more issues, with the largest being a tendency to go into full-auto fire when the selector switch was set to semi-auto. A review of the newly privatized company determined that it was not able to provide good quality control or project management due to the loss of trained personnel after it ceased being a state-run factory. These issues took a while to address so the next prototype wasn't ready until 1997 where it was tested by the military and the Law Enforcement Agencies Training Center (Rendészeti Szervek Kiképző Központja, RSZKK). The Hungarian military accepted the refined weapon, but the police rejected it as unsuitable. This was compounded by the UZI and Micro UZI already filling the KGP-9's role as well as the Heckler & Koch MP5 being accepted for service. The KGP-9 was, however, accepted into service by the Hungarian prison service and approximately 1,000 units were accepted by the military where they served in operations in Kosovo, Afghanistan, and Iraq. The military police later replaced the KGP-9 with the CZ Scorpion Evo 3.

The civilian variant is the KGPF-9, it is capable of semi-automatic fire only.

== Description ==
The KGP-9 operates using a basic blowback mechanism which fires using a hammer mechanism and with a floating firing pin contained in the closed bolt, unlike most firearms of this size and caliber which use an open bolt. The design shares similarities with the popular AK series of weapons, using a front and rear trunion, riveted magazine well attached to the lower receiver, fire control group held in by retaining pints, the top cover held in place by the recoil spring using a guide rod, and the position of the magazine release catch. The charging handle is on the left side and there is no bolt catch. After the last round is fired the magazine follower blocks the bolt from forward movement. This leads to magazines having to be removed forcefully rather than dropping out when the release is pressed. The push-button safety is located forward of the trigger, inside of the guard, with the operational sequence being left for semi-auto, centered for safe, and right for full auto.

Internally some influence from the UZI can be seen with the telescopic bolt wrapping around part of the barrel and the chamber. This aids in reducing the overall length and assists with stability when full auto is used. This system, along with the closed bolt design, provide good accuracy an semi and auto fire. Like the UZI, a barrel nut holds the barrel in place, allowing for quick changes if needed.
