= P9RC =

Semi-automatic pistol

- Type: Semi-automatic pistol
- Place of origin: Hungary

Service history
- In service: 1994-2010

Production history
- Designer: József Kameniczky
- Designed: 1980
- Manufacturer: FÉG
- Produced: Fegyver es Gazkeszulekgyar (FÉG): 1980-2003; FégArmy Kft: 2003-2005

Specifications
- Mass: 35oz (unloaded), 41oz (loaded)
- Length: 7.99”
- Barrel length: 4.65”
- Cartridge: 9×19mm Parabellum
- Action: Short recoil operated
- Feed system: 14-round detachable box magazine
- Sights: blade front, notch rear

The P9RC is a semi-automatic pistol designed by József Kameniczky and manufactured by the FÉGARMY Arms Factory.

== History ==
The P9RC was designed in 1980 by József Kameniczky. It was originally made for export to the civilian market.

The P9RC was adopted in 1996 to replace the PA-63 after the end of the Warsaw Pact. The pistol was known as the P9RC in police service while the 96M is the name used in the Hungarian military.

It was one of the many Hungarian Browning Hi-Power copies made alongside the PJK-9HP (P9M),, MBK-9HP9, FP9, and with variants including the P9L, P9R, P9RK, AC, ACK, GKK and the B9R.

=== Replacement ===
In the 1990s, some P9RCs were replaced on a limited basis by the IWI Jericho 941 and the Heckler & Koch USP in the Hungarian police service. In 2018, the CZ P 09 became the standard pistol in the Hungarian police and military.

== Design ==
The P9RC is based on the P9R, a design based on the Browning Hi-Power and Smith & Wesson Model 59.

There are 4 notable differences: the guide rod assembly, the bottom part of the barrel (on which the tilting barrel locking system works), the wider extractor and the grips. Earlier P9RCs had wooden grips, later ones came with plastics as well, while P9RCs were made with plastics only.

== Clones ==
=== China ===
Chinese clone of the P9RC.

=== Mauser 80SA ===
German clone based on Fegyver- és Gépgyár parts.

=== Mauser 90DA ===
German clone based on Fegyver- és Gépgyár parts.

== Users ==
- Hungary
