= AK-63 =

7.62 mm assault rifle

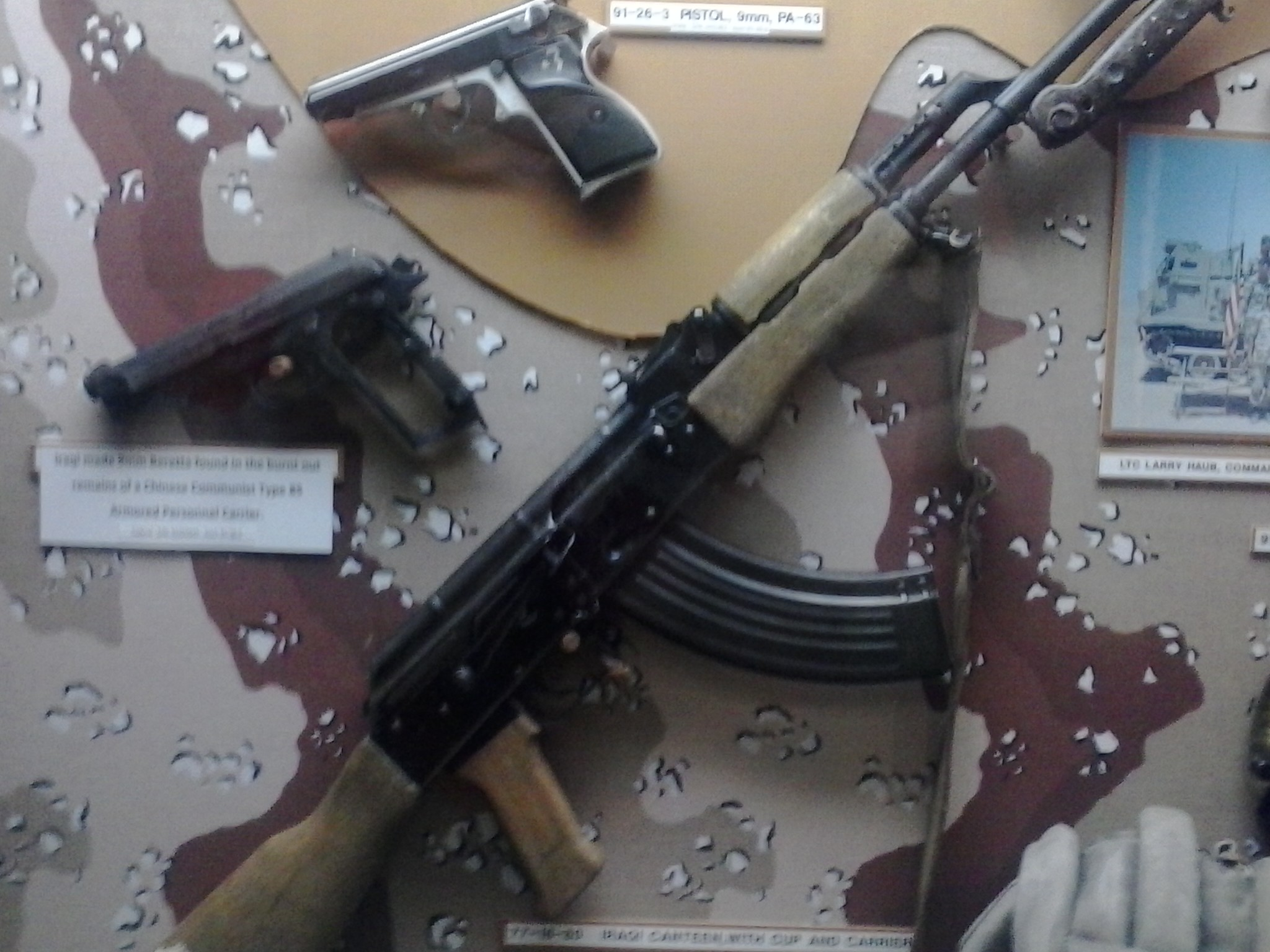
- The AK-63
- Type: Assault rifle
- Place of origin: Hungarian People's Republic

Service history
- In service: 1977–present
- Used by: See Users
- Wars: See Conflicts

Production history
- Designed: 1977
- Manufacturer: Fegyver- és Gépgyár
- Produced: 1977–2001
- Variants: See Variants

Specifications
- Mass: 7.9 lbs (3.6 kg)
- Length: 34.6 in (88 cm)
- Barrel length: 16.3 in (41.5 cm)
- Cartridge: 7.62×39mm
- Caliber: 7.62mm
- Action: Gas-operated, rotating bolt
- Rate of fire: 600 rounds/min
- Effective firing range: 500m
- Feed system: 10, 20, 30, 40-round box magazines, 75 or 100-round drum magazine
- Sights: Iron sights

The AK-63 is a Hungarian variant of the AKM assault rifle manufactured by the Fegyver- és Gépgyár (FÉG) state arms plant in Hungary. During the Cold War and afterwards, the AK-63 series was widely exported to a number of nations in Eastern Europe, the Middle East, Africa, and South America.

== History ==
Although the AMD-65 had been the Hungarian service rifle since 1965, it was more expensive to build, and the forward grips had a reputation for being easily damaged in the field.

In the late-1970s, the Hungarian Defense Ministry requested that FÉG manufacture a cheaper rifle based on the more traditional Soviet AKM design. By the end of 1977, the AK-63 was adopted by the Hungarian People's Army (beginning with the Ground Forces).

In 1978, FÉG added a folding stock AKMS version of the AK-63 to their catalogue; thereafter, the fixed-stock AK-63 became known as the AK-63F (Wooden Stock) and the folding-stock version was designated AK-63D (Descent). All AK-63s in Hungarian military service are expected to be replaced by 2030.

== Features ==
The AK-63 F and D (AMM and AMMS) are both nearly identical externally to the USSR-manufactured AKM and AKMS. The main difference is that the AK-63 series retains the distinctive-looking straight pistol grip of the AKM-63.

The forward hand grip of the AK-63 also lacks the palm swells which characterize the Soviet AKM (and most AKM copies made in many other countries). The stepped lightening cut on the bolt carrier is absent and retains the relief ports on the gas tube. The wood on the AK-63, like that of the AKM-63, has a bright, laminated blond finish.

== Variants ==
=== AK-63D ===
AKMS copy with an under-folding steel stock, designated as the AMMS in Hungarian service.

=== AK-63F ===
Basic fixed-stock copy of the Soviet AKM, designated as the AMM (Automata Kalasnyikov Modernizált Magyarosított) in Hungarian service.

=== AK-63MA ===
Modernized version of the AK-63F, unveiled in 2013.

=== SA-2000S ===
Federal Assault Weapons ban-era version with single stack magazine. Exclusively for the US market.

=== SA-85M ===
A semi-automatic-only version intended for civilian sales in the United States; imported by Kassnar (of Harrisburg, PA) in both pre- and post-ban versions. Around 7,000 pre-ban SA-85Ms were imported prior to 1989, it is now considered a collector's item amongst firearms enthusiasts and commands high prices.

=== SA-85S ===
Semi-auto version with thumbhole stock produced from 1990 to 1994; around 24,500 imported to the US.

== Users ==
- Hungary: Main service rifle of the Hungarian Defence Forces. To be replaced by the CZ BREN 2.
- India: Phase out for replaced by the AK-203.
- Iran: Most likely captured rifles from Iraq used by Iranian Revolutionary Guards.
- Iraq
- Nicaragua
- Somalia
- Zambia

=== Former users ===
- Croatia: Known to be used in Croatian War of Independence.

=== Non-State Users ===
- Farabundo Martí National Liberation Front
- Islamic State
- Kurdistan Workers' Party
- Sandinista National Liberation Front
- Women's Protection Units

== Conflicts ==
=== 1980s ===
- Nicaraguan Revolution (1961–1990)
- Lebanese Civil War (1975–1990)
- Salvadoran Civil War (1979–1992)
- Iran–Iraq War (1980–1988)
- Sri Lankan civil war (1983–2009)

=== 1990s ===
- Gulf War (1990–1991)
- Croatian War of Independence (1991–1995)
- Yugoslav Wars (1991–2001)
- Somali Civil War (1991–present)

=== 2000s ===
- War in Afghanistan (2001–2021)
- Iraq War (2003–2011)

=== 2010s ===
- Libyan civil war (2011)
- Syrian civil war (2011–2024)
- War in Iraq (2013–2017)

== Gallery ==
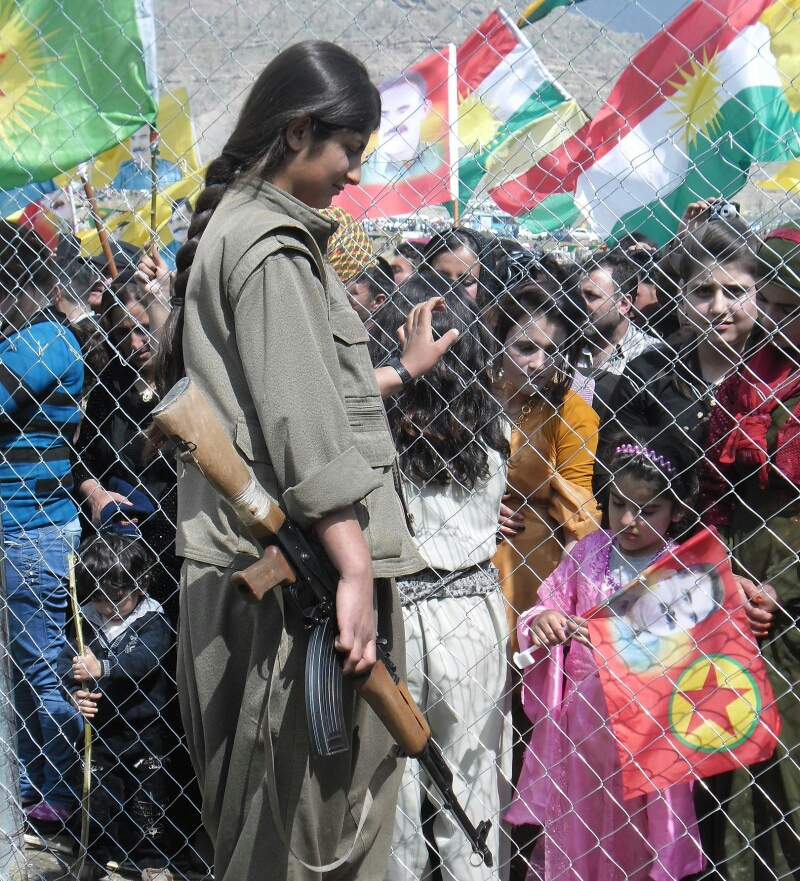
Kurdish PKK fighter holding an AK-63.

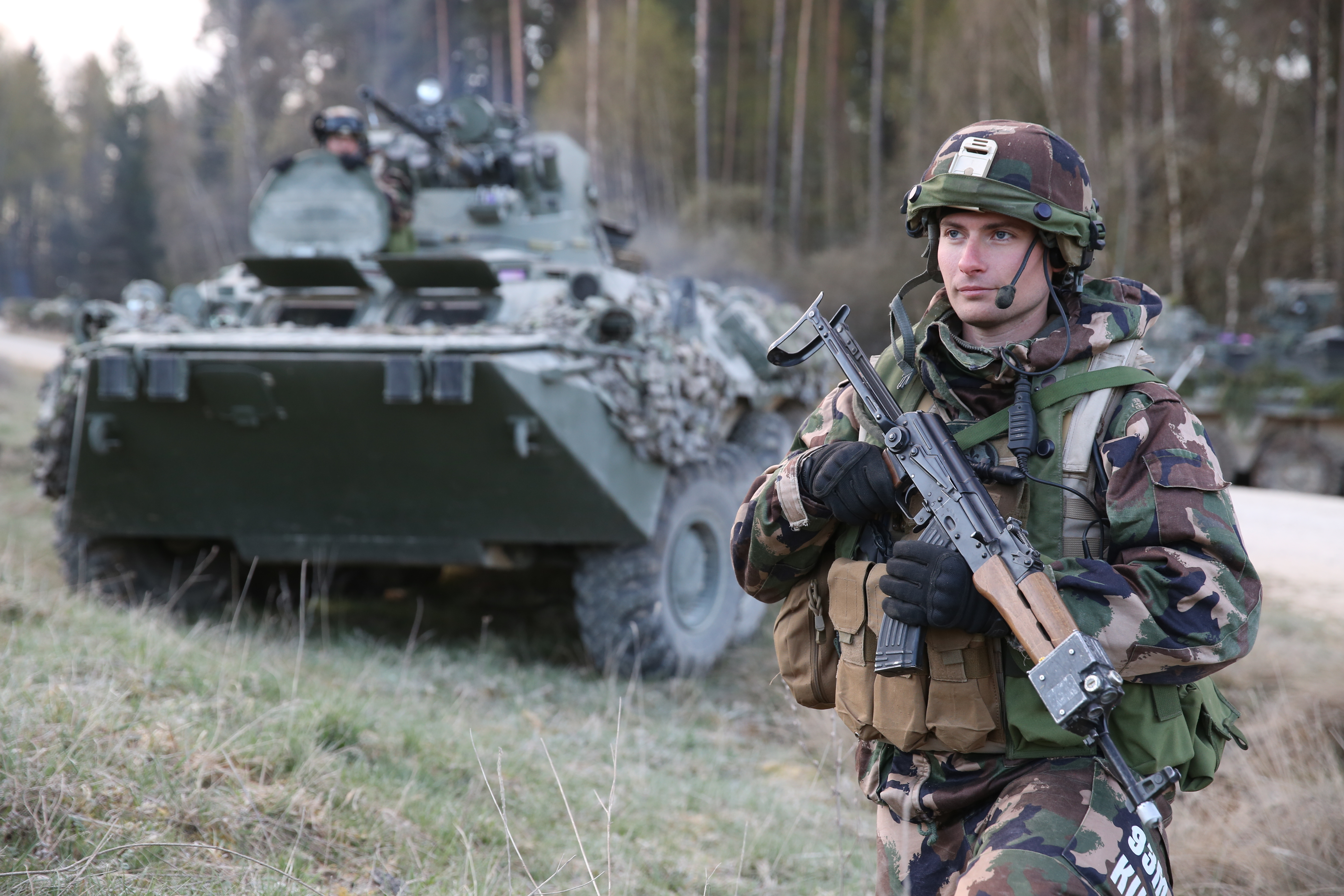
Hungarian soldier with an AK-63.
