= FEG PA-63 =

FÉG PA-63
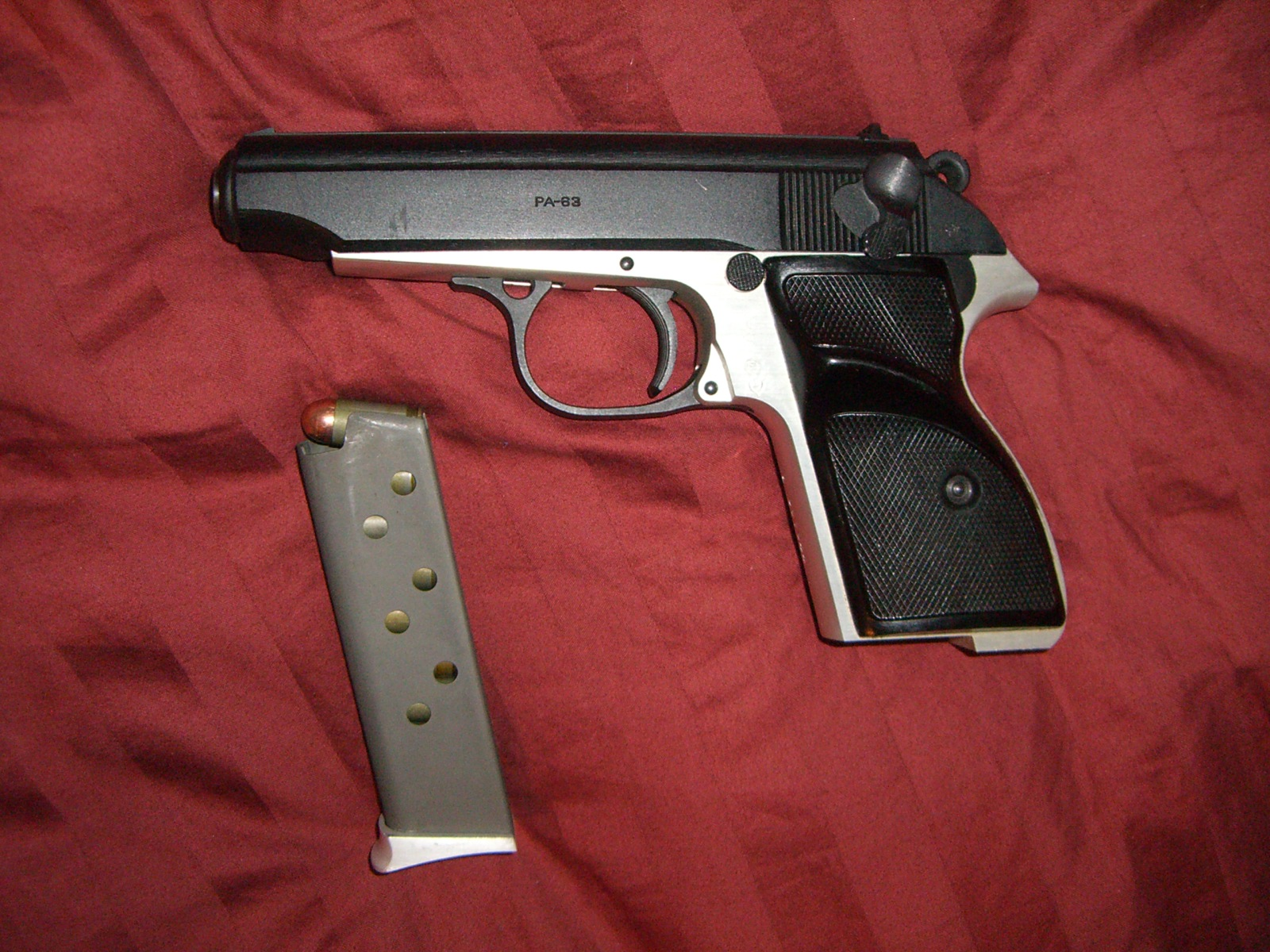
- FÉG PA-63
- Type: Semi-automatic pistol
- Place of origin: Hungarian People's Republic

Service history
- In service: 1963–present
- Wars: The Troubles; Salvadoran Civil War; Persian Gulf War; Iraq War

Production history
- Designer: FÉG
- Designed: Late 1950s
- Manufacturer: FÉG
- Produced: 1963–1990
- Variants: FÉG AP7.65, FÉG PMK-380, FÉG AP9, FÉG PPH

Specifications
- Mass: 595 g (21.0 oz)
- Length: 175 mm (6.9 in)
- Barrel length: 100 mm (3.9 in)
- Cartridge: 9×18mm Makarov.32 ACP (7.65mm Browning).380 ACP (9mm Short)
- Action: blowback
- Muzzle velocity: 315 m/s (1,033 ft/s)
- Effective firing range: 50 m (164 ft)
- Feed system: 7-round detachable box magazine
- Sights: blade front, notch rear

The FÉG PA-63 is a semi-automatic pistol designed and manufactured by the FÉGARMY Arms Factory of Hungary.

== History ==
FÉGARMY Arms Factory (FÉG) of Hungary started producing Walther PP/PPK clones in the late 1940s, starting with their Model 48 which differed from the Walther PP only in minor details.

By the late 1950s, FÉG began making broader changes resulting in the PA-63. It was used by the Hungarian Army from 1963 to 1996.

=== Usage ===
After the fall of communism in 1990, the Hungarian army and police units initiated a program to replace the PA-63 with pistols using the NATO-standard 9×19mm Parabellum cartridge, first the imported Jericho 941, followed by the domestically produced P9RC, but the PA-63 is still in service in Hungarian law enforcement.

It has been largely phased out in Hungary, but due to the large number produced, they are a popular and affordable surplus firearm since they have begun to be imported to the west.

== Design ==
The military standard PA-63 version, chambered in 9×18mm Makarov, sports a two-tone polished aluminum frame with black slide, grips, trigger and hammer assembly.

While unusual for military issue in that a reflective polish was used, it was chosen due to its relative cheapness as well as quicker build time.

== Variants ==
Due to the PA-63's popularity and relative durability, FÉG later issued models using .32 ACP and .380 ACP caliber rounds, the FÉG AP7.65 and PMK-380 respectively.

The AP7.65 is almost identical to the PA-63 except that it is chambered in 7.65mm Browning (.32 ACP) and is anodized not two toned.

The PMK-380 is chambered in the .380 ACP cartridge with a blued titanium-aluminum alloy frame and blued steel slide.

In 2000, FÉG began producing the Walther PPK/E under license from Walther. It is available in .22 LR, .32 ACP and .380 ACP.

=== The Makarov label ===
PA-63s sold in the United States are often advertised as "PA-63 Makarov." This can lead some to believe they are purchasing a Makarov pistol instead of a different pistol chambered for the same 9×18mm Makarov caliber. Though both pistols share lineage from the Walther PP/PPK, similar operating principles and use the same ammunition, the Makarov PM is a different design featuring all-steel construction and different lockwork.

There are no parts in common between the FÉG PA-63 and the Makarov pistol.

== Users ==
- Hungary: Formerly used by the Hungarian Army.
- Ba'athist Iraq

=== Non-state users ===
- Irish National Liberation Army
- Farabundo Martí National Liberation Front
