= List of rifles =

A rifle is a firearm designed to be fired from the shoulder, with a barrel that has a helical groove or pattern of grooves ("rifling") cut into the barrel walls. The raised areas of the rifling are called "lands," which make contact with the projectile (for small arms usage, called a bullet), imparting spin around an axis corresponding to the orientation of the weapon.

There are various types of rifles, most notably the automatic rifle, the bolt-action rifle, the lever-action rifle and the semi-automatic rifle.

Name	Designer/Manufacturer	Image	Cartridge	Country	Year
35M rifle			7.92×57mm Mauser; 8×56mmR	Hungary	1935
701 rifle			7.62x39mm	China	1966
1792 contract rifle			.49 in lead ball	United States	1792
Albini-Braendlin rifle	Augusto Albini; Francis Braendlin		11mm	Belgium	1867
Arisaka	Arisaka Nariakira; Kijirō Nambu		6.5×50mmSR Arisaka; 7.7×58mm Arisaka	Japan	1897
ArmaLite AR-5	ArmaLite		.22 Hornet	United States	1956
ArmaLite AR-7	ArmaLite		.22 LR	United States	1958
ArmaLite AR-10	ArmaLite		7.62×51mm NATO.308 Winchester; 6.5mm Creedmoor	United States	1956
ArmaLite AR-15	ArmaLite		.223 Remington; 5.56×45mm	United States	1959
ArmaLite AR-16	ArmaLite		7.62×51mm NATO	United States	1959
ArmaLite AR-18	ArmaLite	ArmaLite AR-18 Right Side	5.56×45mm NATO	United States	1963
ArmaLite AR-30	ArmaLite		.300 Winchester Magnum.308 Winchester.338 Lapua Magnum	United States	2000
ArmaLite AR-100	ArmaLite; Elitool		5.56×45mm NATO	US	1980s
Automatkarabiner mod. 1937	Schweizerische Industrie Gesellschaft (SIG)			Switzerland	1937
Baker rifle	Ezekiel Baker		.615 in lead ball	Kingdom of Great Britain	1798
Berdan rifle	Hiram Berdan		10.75×58 mmR; 24 gram paper-patched round nose lead bullet 7.62×54mmR	United States; Russia	1868
Berkut rifle	KBP Instrument Design Bureau		.308 Winchester; 7.62×54mmR; 9×53mmR	Russia	1998
Berthier rifle	André Berthier		8mm Lebel; 7.5×54mm French	France	1890
Blaser R8	Blaser		.222 Remington	Germany	2008
Blaser R93	Blaser		Various, see article	Germany	1993
Browning BLR	Browning Arms Company		.22-250 Remington.223 Remington.257 Roberts.243 Winchester.270 Winchester.270 Winchester Short Magnum.30-06 Springfield.300 Winchester Short Magnum.308 Winchester.325 Winchester Short Magnum.358 Winchester.450 Marlin; 7mm Remington Magnum; 7mm Winchester Short Magnum; 7mm-08 Remington	United States	1960s
Brunswick rifle			.654 in lead ball.704 in lead ball	United Kingdom	1836
BSA Autorifle	Birmingham Small Arms Company		.303 British	United Kingdom	1924
Bushmaster M17S	Edenpine; 220px		5.56×45mm NATO	Australia; United States	1992
C11 (rifle)	Colt Canada		5.56×45mm NATO	Canada	1982
C12A1	Rangemaster Precision Arms		7.62×51mm NATO	Canada	
Carcano	Salvatore Carcano		6.5×52mm Carcano; 7.35×51mm Carcano; 6.5×54mm Mannlicher–Schönauer; 6.5×50mmSR Arisaka	Italy	1890
Cei-Rigotti	Amerigo Cei-Rigotti		6.5×52mm Mannlicher–Carcano; 7.65×53mm Mauser	Italy	1900
Chiang Kai-shek rifle	Kung Hsien; Hanyang Arsenal; Jinling; Canton Arsenals		7.92×57mm Mauser	China	1935
CMMG Mk47 Mutant	CMMG Inc.		7.62×39mm	United States	2014
Colt-Burgess rifle	Colt's Manufacturing Company		.44-40 Winchester	United States	1883
Colt C-19	Colt Canada		7.62×51mm NATO.308 Winchester	Finland	2015
Colt Lighting rifle	Colt's Manufacturing Company		.44-40	United States	1884
Colt's New Model Revolving rifle	Colt's Manufacturing Company			United States	1855
Colt ring lever rifles	Colt's Manufacturing Company		.34 in lead ball.36 in lead ball.38 in lead ball.40 in lead ball.44 in lead ball	United States	1837
CS/LR35	Norinco		7.62×51mm NATO		2020
CZ 452	Česká Zbrojovka Uherský Brod		.22 LR.22 Winchester Magnum Rimfire.17 HMR.17 HM2	Czechoslovakia	1943
CZ 455	Česká Zbrojovka Uherský Brod		.22 LR.22 Winchester Magnum Rimfire.17 HMR.17 HM2	Czech Republic	2007
CZ 511	Česká zbrojovka Uherský Brod; Česká zbrojovka Strakonice		.22 LR	Czech Republic	1996
CZ 527	Česká Zbrojovka Uherský Brod		.22 LR.22 Winchester Magnum Rimfire.17 HMR.17 HM2	Czech Republic	2021
CZ 550	Česká Zbrojovka Uherský Brod		.243 Winchester.270 Winchester.300 Winchester Magnum.300 Remington Ultra Magnum.308 Winchester.458 Winchester Magnum.338 Lapua Magnum.375 Ruger.375 H&H Magnum.404 Jeffery.416 Ruger.416 Rigby.416 Taylor.416 Remington Magnum.425 Westley Richards.450 Rigby.458 Lott.500 Jeffery.505 Gibbs.22-250 Remington; 6.5×55mm 7.62×51mm NATO; 7×64mm 7.92×57mm Mauser; 9.3×62mm.30-06 Springfield	Czech Republic	1920s
Dreyse needle gun	Johann Nikolaus von Dreyse		Acorn-shaped lead bullet in paper cartridge	Prussia	1836
Dutch Mannlicher	Steyr Mannlicher		6.5×53mmR.303 British; 7.7×58mm Arisaka	Austrian Empire; Kingdom of Hungary	1895
Eidgenössischer Stutzer 1851	Beuret Frères à Liège		10.5 mm	Switzerland	1851
El Tigre (rifle)	Garate, Anitua y Cia		.44-40 Winchester	Restoration (Spain)	1892
Farquhar–Hill rifle	Moubray G. Farquhar; Arthur H. Hill		.303 British	United Kingdom	1908
FDM L4/L5	Forward Defense Munitions		6mm	United States	2018
Ferguson rifle			.615 in lead ball	Kingdom of Great Britain	1770
Fort Ellis XR86	Fort Ellis, Abingdon Pennsylvania		5.56×45mm NATO	United States	1986
Fucile Armaguerra Mod. 39	Società Anonima Revelli Manifattura Armaguerra		6.5×52mm Carcano; 7.35×51mm Carcano	Italy	1939
Fusil Automatique Modèle 1917	Manufacture d'Armes de Tulle; Manufacture d'Armes de Saint-Etienne		8mm Lebel	France	1917
Fusil Gras mle 1874	Manufacture d'armes de Saint-Étienne; Steyr Mannlicher		11×59mmR; 8mm Lebel	France	1874
G150 Präzisionsgewehr	SIG Sauer		10.4x33mmR	Switzerland	1981
General Liu rifle	Hanyang Arsenal		7.92×57mm Mauser	China	1914
Gewehr 1888	Ludwig Loewe; Haenel; Steyr Mannlicher; Hanyang Arsenal		7.92×57mm Mauser	German Empire	1888
Gewehr 43	Carl Walther GMBH		7.92×57mm Mauser	Germany	1943
Gewehr 98	Mauser; Deutsche Waffen und Munitionsfabriken; Haenel; Sauer & Sohn; Waffenwerke Oberspree; Chr. Schilling Co. Simson (company)		7.92×57mm Mauser	German Empire	1898
Hanyang 88	Hanyang Arsenal		7.92×57mm Mauser	China	1895
Harpers Ferry Model 1803	Harpers Ferry Armory		.525 in lead ball	United States	1803
Hawken rifle	Jacob and Samuel Hawken		.54 in lead ball	United States	1823
Henry repeating rifle	Benjamin Tyler Henry		.44 Henry rimfire	United States	1860
Heym Express Magnum	Heym (gun manufacturer)		Various, see article	Germany	1986
Howell Automatic Rifle			.303 British	United Kingdom	1915
Infanteriegewehr 1863			10.5 mm	Switzerland	1863
Infanteriegewehr Modell 1842	Francotte Liège; Beuret Frères		18 mm	Switzerland	1842
Ishapore 2A1 rifle	Ordnance Factories Board		7.62×51mm NATO	India	1963
Jägergewehr 1856/59	Beuret Frères à Liège		10.5 mm	Switzerland	1853
Jarmann M1884	Jacob Smith Jarmann		10.15×61mmR	Norway	1878
Johnson Model 1936			.30-06 Springfield	United States	1936
Joslyn rifle	Joslyn Firearms Company		.54 or .58 in lead ball	United States	1855
Jungle carbine	Royal Ordnance Factory Fazakerley, Birmingham Small Arms Company		.303 British	United Kingdom	1944
Kalashnikov M1916	Sestroretsk plant		7.62×54mmR	Russian Empire	1916
Kalthoff repeater	Kalthoff gunsmiths		.40-.80 in	Denmark	1630
Kammerlader			Minié ball in paper cartridge	Norway	1842
Karabinek wz. 1929	Państwowa Fabryka Karabinów; FB "Łucznik" Radom		7.92×57mm Mauser	Poland	1929
Karabiner 98k	Mauser		7.92×57mm Mauser	Germany	1935
Kb wz. 98a			7.92×57mm Mauser	Poland	1934
Kbsp wz. 1938M			7.92×57mm Mauser	Poland	1934
Knötgen automatic rifle	M. Knötgen		7.92×57mm Mauser	German Empire	1910
Kel-Tec RFB	Kel-Tec		7.62×51mm NATO	United States	2003
Krag–Jørgensen	Ole Herman Johannes Krag and Erik Jørgensen		8×58mmR Danish Krag.30-40 Krag; 6.5×55mm	Norway	1886
Krag–Petersson	Ole Herman Johannes Krag and Axel Jacob Petersson		12.17×44mm rimfire	Norway	1872
Kropatschek rifle			8×56mmR; 8×60mmR	Austrian Empire; Kingdom of Hungary	1886
Lee–Enfield	James Paris Lee; Royal Small Arms Factory		.303 British	United Kingdom of Great Britain and Ireland	1895
Lee–Metford	Royal Small Arms Factory		.303 British	United Kingdom	1884
Lee Speed	Royal Small Arms Factory; Birmingham Small Arms Company		.303 British	United Kingdom	1890
Liegeoise 1888	Manufacture Liégeoise d'Armes		7.65x53mm Mauser	Belgium	1888
Lorenz rifle	Joseph Lorenz		.54 in lead ball	Austrian Empire	1855
Long rifle	Martin Meylin and/or Robert Baker		.25 cal to .62 cal - .40 to .48 cal	United States	1700s
M1 Garand	Springfield Armory; Winchester Repeating Arms Company; H&R Firearms; International Harvester; Springfield Armory, Inc.		.30-06 Springfield; 7.62×51mm NATO.308 Winchester	United States	1928
M8 /X01 "Garage Gun"	Eugene Stoner		.30-06 Springfield	United States	1950s
M1819 Hall rifle	John Hancock Hall		.525 in lead ball (original); Paper w/.69 Ball (conversion)	United States	1811
M1841 Mississippi rifle	Harpers Ferry Armory		.54 in lead ball.58 Minie ball	United States	1840
M1867 Russian Krnka	Tula Arms Plant		15.24x40mmR	Russian Empire	1867
M1870 Belgian Comblain	Hubert-Joseph Comblain		11×50mm R Comblain	Belgium	1870
M1870 Italian Vetterli			10.4×47mmR; 6.5×52mm Carcano	Kingdom of Italy	1870
M1885 Remington–Lee	Sharps Rifle Manufacturing Company; Remington Arms		6mm Lee Navy.45-70.43 Spanish	United States	1879
M1895 Lee Navy	Winchester Repeating Arms Company		6mm Lee Navy	United States	1895
M1903 Springfield	Springfield Armory		.30-03.30-06 Springfield	United States	1903
M1917 Enfield	Winchester Repeating Arms Company; Remington Arms; Eddystone Arsenal		.30-06 Springfield	United States	1917
M1922 Bang rifle	Søren Hansen Bang		.30-06 Springfield; 6.5×55mm	United States; Denmark	1922
Mannlicher M1886	Steyr Mannlicher		8×52mmR Mannlicher; 11×58mmR	Austrian Empire; Kingdom of Hungary	1886
Mannlicher M1888	Steyr Mannlicher; Fegyver- és Gépgyár		7.92×57mm Mauser; 8×50mmR Mannlicher; 8×52mmR Mannlicher	Austrian Empire; Kingdom of Hungary	1887
Mannlicher M1890 carbine	Steyr Mannlicher		8×50mmR Mannlicher; 7.92×57mm Mauser; 8×56mmR	Austrian Empire; Kingdom of Hungary	1890
Mannlicher M1893	Steyr Mannlicher		6.5×53mmR; 8×50mmR Mannlicher.22 LR	Austrian Empire; Kingdom of Hungary	1892
Mannlicher M1893 self loading rifle	Steyr Mannlicher		8×50mmR Mannlicher	Austrian Empire; Kingdom of Hungary	1893
Mannlicher M1895	Steyr Mannlicher; Fegyver- és Gépgyár; Zbrojovka Brno		7.92×57mm Mauser; 8×50mmR Mannlicher; 8×56mmR	Austrian Empire; Kingdom of Hungary	1895
Mannlicher–Schönauer	Steyr Mannlicher; Breda Meccanica Bresciana		6.5×54mm Mannlicher–Schönauer	Austrian Empire; Kingdom of Hungary	1903
Marga rifle	Uldarique Marga		8mm Mauser	Belgium	1880s
Marlin Model 20	Marlin Firearms		.22 LR	United States	1960
Marlin Model 60	Marlin Firearms		.22 LR	United States	1960
Marlin Model 70P	Marlin Firearms		.22 LR	United States	2008
Marlin Model 336	Marlin Firearms; Remington Arms		.30-30 Winchester.35 Remington.219 Zipper.32 Winchester Special.356 Winchester.375 Winchester.38-55 Winchester.44 Magnum.410 bore.45-70.444 Marlin.450 Marlin.38 Special.357 Magnum.44 Special.44 Magnum.45 Colt	United States	1948
Marlin Model 780	Marlin Firearms		.22 LR	United States	1988
Marlin Model 795	Marlin Firearms		.22 LR	United States	2007
Marlin Model Golden 39A	Marlin Firearms		.22 Short.22 Long.22 LR	United States	1891
Marlin Model XT-22	Marlin Firearms		.22 LR	United States	2011
Martini Cadet	BSA and W.W. Greener		.310 Cadet	United Kingdom	1891
Martini–Enfield	Royal Small Arms Factory		.303 British	United Kingdom	1878
Martini–Henry	Royal Small Arms Factory		.577/450 Boxer-Henry.577/450 Martini–Henry.303 British; 11.43×55R (Ottoman); 11.43×59R (Ottoman); 7.65×53mm Mauser (Ottoman)	United Kingdom	1870
MAS-36 rifle	Manufacture d'Armes de Saint-Étienne		7.5×54mm French	France	1936
MAS-49 rifle	Manufacture d'Armes de Saint-Étienne		7.5×54mm French	France	1949
Mauser-Koka	Mauser; Zastava Arms		10.15×63mmR	Kingdom of Serbia	1871
Mauser M59	Kongsberg Small Arms		7.62×51mm NATO.30-06 Springfield	Norway	1959
Mauser M 98	Mauser		Varies, see article	German Empire	1895
Mauser Model 1871	Mauser		11×60mm Mauser; 10.15×63mmR; 11.15×37mmR; 9.5×60mmR; 11×59mmR Gras; 7×57mm Mauser; 7.65×53mm Mauser; 6.5×53.5mmR	German Empire	1871
Mauser Model 1889	FN Herstal; Deutsche Waffen und Munitionsfabriken		7.65×53mm Mauser	Belgium	1889
Mauser Model 1895	Deutsche Waffen und Munitionsfabriken		7×57mm Mauser	German Empire	1895
Mauser–Vergueiro	Fábrica de Braço de Prata		6.5×58mm Vergueiro; 7×57mm Mauser; 7.92×57mm Mauser	Portugal	1904
Mendoza RM22	Productos Mendoza S.A. de C.V.		.22 long rifle	Mexico	
Meunier rifle			7x59 "7mm Meunier"	France	1890
Minié rifle			18mm rimmed bullet	France	1849
Model 1814 common rifle	Henry Deringer		.54 in lead ball, black powder, paper	United States	1814
Model 1817 common rifle	Henry Deringer		.54 in lead ball, black powder, paper	United States	1817
Mondragón rifle	Sig Holding AG		7×57mm Mauser	Mexico	1884
Mosin–Nagant	Tula Arms Plant; Kalashnikov Concern; Sestroryetsk; Remington Arms		7.62×54mmR; 7.62×53mmR; 7.92×57mm Mauser; 8×50mmR Mannlicher	Russian Empire	1891
Mossberg 100ATR	O.F. Mossberg & Sons		.243 Winchester.308 Winchester 7mm-08 Remington.30-06 Springfield.270 Winchester	United States	2006
Mossberg 464	O.F. Mossberg & Sons		.30-30 Winchester.22 Long Rifle	United States	2008
Mossberg 702 Plinkster	O.F. Mossberg & Sons		.22 LR	United States	2003
Murata rifle			11×60mmR Murata; 8×53mmR Murata	Japan	1880
Mylonas rifle	Efstathios Mylonas/Emile et Leon Nagant		11×59mmR Gras	Greece	1872
Pattern 1853 Enfield	Royal Small Arms Factory		.577 in lead ball	United Kingdom	1853
Pattern 1861 Enfield musketoon	Royal Small Arms Factory		.577 in lead ball	United Kingdom	1861
Pattern 1913 Enfield	Royal Small Arms Factory		.276 Enfield	United Kingdom	1912
Pattern 1914 Enfield	Royal Small Arms Factory		.303 British	United Kingdom	1914
Pedersen rifle	John Pedersen		.276 Pedersen	United States	1920s
PTR 91F	PTR-91 Industries, Inc.		7.62×51mm NATO	United States	2000
Remington–Keene rifle	Remington Arms		.45-70	United States	1878
Remington M1867	Remington Arms		12.17×42mm RF; 12.17×42mm RF; 12.17×44mmR centerfire 10.15×61mmR; 8×58mmR Danish Krag	United States	1867
Remington 1903/A3	Remington Arms		.30-06 Springfield	United States	1941-45
Remington Model 5	Remington Arms		.17 HMR.22 LR.22 Winchester Magnum Rimfire	United States	2006
Remington Model 8	Remington Arms		.25 Remington.30 Remington.32 Remington.35 Remington.300 Savage	United States	1906
Remington Model 14	Remington Arms		Varies, see article	United States	1908
Remington Model 24	Remington Arms		.22 Short.22 LR	United States	1922
Remington Model 30	Remington Arms		.30-06 Springfield.25 Remington.30 Remington.32 Remington; 7×57mm Mauser.257 Roberts.270 Winchester	United States	1921
Remington Model 34	Remington Arms		.22 Short.22 Long.22 Long Rifle	United States	1932
Remington Model 121 Fieldmaster	Remington Arms		.22 Short.22 Long.22 Long Rifle	United States	1936
Remington Model 241	Remington Arms		.22 Short.22 Long Rifle	United States	1935
Remington Model 341	Remington Arms		.22 Short.22 Long.22 Long Rifle	United States	1936
Remington Model 504	Remington Arms		.17 HM2.17 HMR.22 Long Rifle	United States	2004
Remington Model 511 Scoremaster	Remington Arms		.22 Short.22 Long.22 LR	United States	1939
Remington Model 512 Sportsmaster	Remington Arms		.22 Short.22 Long.22 LR	United States	1940
Remington Model 513	Remington Arms		.22 LR	United States	1940
Remington Model 521 TL Junior	Remington Arms		.22 Short.22 Long.22 LR	United States	1947
Remington Model 522 Viper	Remington Arms		.22 Long Rifle	United States	1993
Remington Model 552	Remington Arms		.22 Short.22 Long.22 LR	United States	1957
Remington Model 597	Remington Arms		.17 HMR.22 LR.22 Winchester Magnum Rimfire	United States	1997
Remington Model 740	Remington Arms		.244 Remington.280 Remington.308 Winchester.30-06 Springfield	United States	1955
Remington Model 742	Remington Arms		.243 Winchester.280 Remington.308 Winchester; 6mm Remington.30-06 Springfield	United States	1960
Remington Model 760	Remington Arms		.30-06 Springfield.300 Savage.35 Remington.222 Remington.223 Remington.243 Winchester.270 Winchester.280 Remington.257 Roberts; 6mm Remington.308 Winchester	United States	1956
Remington Model 572	Remington Arms		.22 Short.22 Long.22 LR	United States	1954
Remington Model 572 Fieldmaster	Remington Arms		.22 Short.22 Long.22 LR	United States	1956
Remington Model 580	Remington Arms		.22 LR	United States	1967
Remington Model 600	Remington Arms		.222 Remington.223 Remington; 6mm Remington; 6.5mm Remington Magnum.243 Winchester.308 Winchester.35 Remington.350 Remington Magnum	United States	1964
Remington Model 660	Remington Arms		.222 Remington.223 Remington; 6mm Remington; 6.5mm Remington Magnum.243 Winchester.308 Winchester.35 Remington.350 Remington Magnum	United States	1968
Remington Model 673	Remington Arms		.300 Remington Short Action Ultra Magnum.350 Remington Magnum; 6.5mm Remington Magnum.308 Winchester	United States	2003
Remington Model 700	Remington Arms		Various, see article	United States	1962
Remington Model 710	Remington Arms		.243 Winchester.270 Winchester.30-06 Springfield; 7mm Remington Magnum.300 Winchester Magnum	United States	2001
Remington Model 721	Remington Arms		Varies, see page	United States	1948
Remington Model 750	Remington Arms		.243 Winchester.270 Winchester.308 Winchester.30-06 Springfield.35 Whelen	United States	2006
Remington Model 770	Remington Arms		.243 Winchester.270 Winchester; 7mm-08 Remington; 7mm Remington Magnum.30-06 Springfield.308 Winchester.300 Winchester Magnum	United States	2007
Remington Model 788	Remington Arms		.222 Remington.223 Remington.22-250 Remington.243 Winchester.308 Winchester; 6mm Remington; 7mm-08 Remington.30-30 Winchester.44 Magnum	United States	1967
Remington Model 798	Remington Arms		.243 Winchester.270 Winchester.300 Winchester Magnum.308 Winchester.375 H&H Magnum.458 Winchester Magnum; 7mm Remington Magnum	United States; Serbia	2006
Remington Model 799	Remington Arms		.22 Hornet.222 Remington.223 Remington.22-250 Remington; 7.62×39mm	United States	2006
Remington Model 7400	Remington Arms		6mm Remington.243 Winchester.270 Winchester.280 Remington.308 Winchester.30-06 Springfield.35 Whelen	United States	1981
Remington Model 7600	Remington Arms		.223 Remington.280 Remington.243 Winchester.270 Winchester.308 Winchester.30-06 Springfield.35 Whelen.35 Remington	United States	1981
Remington Model Four	Remington Arms		.243 Winchester; 6mm Remington.270 Winchester.280 Remington.30-06 Springfield.308 Winchester	United States	1981
Remington Model R-25	Remington Arms		.243 Winchester; 7mm-08 Remington.308 Winchester	United States	1983
Remington Nylon 66	Remington Arms		.22 Long Rifle	United States	1981
Remington Rolling Block rifle	Remington Arms		Various, see article	United States	1864
Ribeyrolles 1918 automatic carbine			8×35mm Ribeyrolle	France	1916
Richmond rifle	Virginia Manufactory of Arms		.58 Minie ball	United States	1861
Rieder Automatic Rifle			.303 British	South Africa	1940
Ross rifle	Charles Ross		.303 British.280 Ross	Canada	1903
Ruger American Rifle	Sturm, Ruger & Co.		Varies, see article	United States	2011
Ruger M77	Sturm, Ruger & Co.		Varies, see article	United States	1968
Ruger SR-556	Sturm, Ruger & Co.		5.56×45mm NATO	United States	2009
Savage Model 99	Savage Arms		Varies, see article	United States	1892
Savage Model 110	Savage Arms		Varies, see article	United States	1956
Schmidt–Rubin	Waffenfabrik Bern		7.5×55mm Swiss; 7.5×54.5mm Swiss	Switzerland	1889
Schulhoff 1894	Josef Schulhoff			Austrian Empire; Kingdom of Hungary	1894
Selrahc Model 7	Inter Ordnance Corporation		5.56×45mm NATO	Australia	
Sharps-Borchardt Model 1878	Sharps Rifle Manufacturing Company		.45 and .50-caliber Sharps	German Empire; United States	1878
Sharps rifle	Christian Sharps		.52-caliber 475-grain projectile with 50-grain (3.2 g) cartridge, later converted to .45-70 Government	United States	1848
Smith & Wesson M&P10	Smith & Wesson		.308 Winchester; 7.62×51mm NATO	United States	2013
Smith & Wesson M&P15-22	Smith & Wesson		.22 LR	United States	2013
Snider–Enfield	Royal Small Arms Factory		.577 Snider	United Kingdom	1860
Spencer repeating rifle	Spencer company Burnside Rifle Co. Winchester Repeating Arms Company		.56-56 Spencer	United States	1860
Springfield Model 1855	Springfield Armory		.58 Minié ball	United States	1861
Springfield Model 1861	Springfield Armory		.58 Minié ball	United States	1856
Springfield Model 1863	Springfield Armory		.58 Minié ball	United States	1863
Springfield Model 1865	Springfield Armory		Rimfire .58-60-500	United States	1865
Springfield Model 1866	Springfield Armory		.50-70 Government	United States	1866
Springfield Model 1868	Springfield Armory		.50-70 Government	United States	1868
Springfield Model 1869	Springfield Armory		.50-70 Government	United States	1869
Springfield model 1870	Springfield Armory		.50-70 Government	United States	1870
Springfield model 1870 Remington—Navy	Springfield Armory		.50-70 Government	United States	1870
Springfield model 1871	Springfield Armory		.50-70 Government	United States	1871
Springfield model 1873	Springfield Armory		.45-70	United States	1873
Springfield Model 1875	Springfield Armory		.45-70	United States	1875
Springfield Model 1877	Springfield Armory		.45-70	United States	1877
Springfield model 1880	Springfield Armory		.45-70	United States	1880
Springfield Model 1882	Springfield Armory		.45-70	United States	1882
Springfield model 1884	Springfield Armory		.45-70	United States	1884
Springfield Model 1886	Springfield Armory		.45-70	United States	1886
Springfield Model 1888	Springfield Armory		.45-70	United States	1888
Springfield Model 1892–99	Springfield Armory		.30-40 Krag	United States	1892
Springfield Model 1922	Springfield Armory		.22 LR	United States	1922
Steyr Model 1912 Mauser	Steyr Mannlicher		7×57mm Mauser	Austria-Hungary	1912
SVD	Kalashnikov Concern Norinco		7.62×54mmR	Soviet Union	1963–present
Tabatière rifle				Second French Empire	1864
TERA rifle				Japan	1941
Thorneycroft carbine			.303 British	United Kingdom	1901
Tikka T3	SAKO		Various, see article	Finland	2003
Type 4 rifle	Yokosuka Naval Arsenal		7.7×58mm Arisaka	Japan	1944
Type 30 rifle			6.5×50mmSR Arisaka.303 British; 6.5×54mm Mannlicher–Schönauer	Japan	1897
Type 35 rifle			6.5×50mmSR Arisaka	Japan	1902
Type 38 rifle			6.5×50mmSR Arisaka	Japan	1906
Type 46 & Type 46/66 Siamese Mauser rifle	Koishikawa Arsenal		8×50mmR; 8×52mmR	(Thailand) Siam	1903
Type 47 & Type 47/66 Siamese Mauser carbine	Koishikawa Arsenal		8×50mmR; 8×52mmR	(Thailand) Siam	1905
Type 66 Siamese rifle	Koishikawa Arsenal		8×52mmR	(Thailand) Siam	1923
Type 99 rifle	Nariakira Arisaka		7.7×58mm Arisaka	Japan	1939
Type I Rifle	Fabbrica Nazionale d'Armi Sezione; Fabbrica d'Armi Regio Esercito		6.5×50mmSR Arisaka	Italy	1938
Vereinsgewehr 1857	Königlich Württembergische Gewehrfabrik and others in Suhl		.547 inches (13.9 mm) Minié ball	Baden; Württemberg; Hesse	1865
Vetterli rifle	Sig Holding AG; Waffenfabrik Bern		10.4×38mm Swiss Rimfire	Switzerland	1869
VKS sniper rifle	CKIB SOO		12.7×55mm STs-130	Russia	2002
Volkssturmgewehr			7.92×33mm Kurz	Germany	1944
vz. 24	Česká zbrojovka Uherský Brod		7×57mm Mauser; 7.65×53mm Mauser; 7.92×57mm Mauser	Czechoslovakia	1924
vz. 33	Česká zbrojovka Uherský Brod		7.92×57mm Mauser	Czechoslovakia	1933
vz. 52 rifle	Česká zbrojovka Uherský Brod; Považské strojárne		7.62×45mm 7.62×39mm	Czechoslovakia	1951
vz. 98/22	Česká zbrojovka Uherský Brod		7.92×57mm Mauser	Czechoslovakia	1922
Walther G22	Walther		.22 LR	Germany	2002
Walther WA 2000	Walther		7.62×51mm NATO.300 Winchester Magnum; 7.5×55mm Swiss	West Germany	1978-1988
Wänzel rifle	Franz Wänzel		14×33R rimfire & centerfire	Austrian Empire	1854
Whitworth rifle	Whitworth Rifle Company		.451 caliber bullet	United Kingdom	1854
Werndl–Holub rifle	Steyr Mannlicher		11×58mmR; 11.15×42mmR	Austrian Empire; Kingdom of Hungary	1867
Winchester Model 67	Winchester Repeating Arms Company		.22 Short.22 Long.22 LR.22 Winchester Rimfire	United States	1934
Winchester Model 1886	Winchester Repeating Arms Company		Varies, see article	United States	1886
Winchester Model 1890	Winchester Repeating Arms Company		.22 Short.22 Long.22 LR.22 Winchester Rimfire	United States	1890
Winchester Model 1892	Winchester Repeating Arms Company		.25-20 Winchester.32-20 Winchester.38-40 Winchester.44-40 Winchester.218 Bee	United States	1892
Winchester Model 1894	Winchester Repeating Arms Company		Varies, see article	United States	1894
Winchester Model 1895	Winchester Repeating Arms Company; Browning Arms Company		.30-40 Krag; 7.62×54mmR.303 British.30-06 Springfield.35 Winchester.38-72 Winchester.40-72 Winchester.405 Winchester	United States	1895
Winchester Model 1905	Winchester Repeating Arms Company		.32 Winchester Self-Loading.35 Winchester Self-Loading	United States	1905
Winchester Model 1906	Winchester Repeating Arms Company		.22 Short.22 Long.22 LR	United States	1906
Winchester Model 1907	Winchester Repeating Arms Company		.351 Winchester Self-Loading	United States	1907
Winchester Model 1910	T.C. Johnson		.351 Winchester Self-Loading	United States	1910
ZH-29	Zbrojovka Brno		7.92×57mm Mauser	Czechoslovakia	1929

== See also ==
- List of weapons
- List of firearms
- List of assault rifles
- List of battle rifles
- List of bolt-action rifles
- List of carbines
- List of shotguns
- List of straight-pull rifles
- List of pump-action rifles
- List of machine guns
- List of multiple-barrel firearms
- List of pistols
- List of semi-automatic pistols
- List of revolvers
- List of sniper rifles
