= List of bolt action rifles =

Bolt action rifles are an evolution of the lever action rifle, offering greater accuracy and stronger receivers. Bolt actions require the user to manually cycle the bolt after each round is fired, and are usually loaded with stripper clips or magazines

Name	Image	Cartridge(s)	Year	Country of origin
35M rifle		8x56mmR; 7.92x57mm Mauser	1935	Kingdom of Hungary
Kb wz. 98a		7.92x57mm Mauser	1936	Poland
Kbk wz. 29		7.92x57mm Mauser	1930	Poland
Accuracy International AWM		.300 Winchester Magnum.338 Lapua Magnum	1996	United Kingdom
Arisaka Type 30		6.5x50mm Arisaka	1899	Empire of Japan
Arisaka Type 38		6.5x50mm Arisaka	1906	Empire of Japan
Arisaka Type 99		7.7x58mm Arisaka	1939	Empire of Japan
ArmaLite AR-50		.50 BMG.416 Barrett	1999	United States
Berdan rifle		10.75×58 mmR; 7.62×54mmR	1870	Russian Empire
Berthier rifle		8mm Lebel; 7.5x54mm French	1890	France
BMS Cam rifle		5.56×45mm NATO	1980	United Kingdom
Bor		7.62x51mm NATO	2006	Poland
Browning A-Bolt		.223 Remington.22 Hornet.375 H&H Magnum	1984	United States/ Japan
Cabañas RC-30		.17 Munisalva	1949	Mexico
Carcano		6.5×50mm Arisaka; 6.5×52mm Carcano; 6.5×54mm Mannlicher–Schönauer; 7.92×57mm Mauser	1891	Kingdom of Italy
Chassepot		Lead bullet 25 g (386 grains) in paper cartridge 11×59mmR Gras	1866	France
Dreyse needle gun		Acorn-shaped lead bullet in paper cartridge	1835	Kingdom of Prussia
FN Model 24		7×57mm Mauser; 7.62×51mm NATO.30-06 Springfield; 7.65×53mm Mauser; 7.92×57mm Mauser	1924	Belgium
Fusil Gras mle 1874		11×59mmR Gras; 8×50mmR Lebel	1874	France
Geweer M. 95		6.5×53mmR.303 British; 7.7×58mm Arisaka	1895	Netherlands
Gewehr 1888		M/88; 7.92x57mm Mauser	1888	German Empire
Gewehr 98		M/88 7.92×57mm Mauser	1898	German Empire
Hanyang 88		M/88	1895	Republic of China
Howa M1500		.22-250 Remington.223 Remington.204 Ruger; 6.5×55mm.300 Winchester Magnum.308 Winchester.30-06 Springfield.338 Winchester Magnum.375 Ruger; 7.62x39mm 6.5mm Grendel	1979	Japan
IOF .30-06 sporting rifle		.30-06 Springfield	2007	India
IOF .315 sporting rifle		8mm BSA (8x50mmR Mannlicher)	1956	India
Ishapore 2A1 rifle		7.62x51mm NATO	1962	India
Jungle carbine		.303 British	1944	United Kingdom
K31		7.5×55mm Swiss	1933	Switzerland
Karabiner 98k		7.92×57mm Mauser	1935	Nazi Germany
Krag–Jørgensen		6.5×55mm.30-40 Krag 8×58mmR Danish Krag	1886	Norway
Lebel 1886 rifle		8×50mmR Lebel	1887	France
Lee-Enfield		.303 British	1895	United Kingdom
Lee-Metford		.303 British	1884	United Kingdom
M1870/87 Italian Vitterli Vitali		6.5x52mm Carcano	1887	Kingdom of Italy
M1871 Beaumont		11.3x50mmR; 11x52mmR	1869	Netherlands
M1903 Springfield rifle		.30-03.30-06 Springfield	1903	United States
M1917 Enfield rifle		.30-06 Springfield	1917	United States
M200 Intervention		.408 CheyTac	2001	United States
MAK Enterprises Tubegun		6mm BR.243 Winchester.240 NMC	1999	United States
Mannlicher M1886		11x58mmR; 8x52mmR Mannlicher	1886	Austrian Empire; Kingdom of Hungary
Mannlicher M1888		8x52mmR Mannlicher; 8x50mmR Mannlicher; 7.92x57mm Mauser	1888	Austrian Empire; Kingdom of Hungary
Mannlicher M1895		8x50mmR Mannlicher; 8x56mmR; 8x57mm IS	1896	Austrian Empire; Kingdom of Hungary
Mannlicher–Schönauer		6.5×54mm Mannlicher–Schönauer; 8×50mmR Mannlicher.30-06 Springfield	1903	Austrian Empire; Kingdom of Hungary
Marga rifle		8mm Mauser	1880s	Belgium
MAS-36		7.5×54mm French	1937	France
Mauser Model 1871		7×57mm Mauser; 11×60mm Mauser; 6.5×53.5R; 11.15×37R; 10.15×63R	1872	German Empire
Mauser M71/84		11×60mm Mauser; 11×59mmR Gras; 10.15×63R; 9.5×60R; 7.65×53mm Argentine	1884	German Empire
Mauser–Vergueiro		6.5×58mm Vergueiro; 7×57mm Mauser; 7.92×57mm Mauser	1904	Portugal
Mosin–Nagant		7.62×54mmR; 7.62x53mmR; 7.92x57mm Mauser; 8x50mmR Mannlicher	1891	Russian Empire
Mossberg MVP		.243 Winchester.270 Winchester.308 Winchester.30-06 Springfield; 7mm-08 Remington	2012	United States
Murata rifle		11x60mmR Murata; 8x53mmR Murata	1885	Empire of Japan
POF Light Sniper Rifle		7.62×51mm NATO	2016	Pakistan
Remington-Lee		.45-70.43 Spanish	1879	United States
Remington Model 700		.223 Remington.243 Winchester.300 Winchester Magnum.300 Remington Ultra Magnum.308 Winchester.338 Lapua Magnum; 7.62×51mm NATO	1962	United States
Ross rifle		.303 British	1903	Canada
Ruger American		.204 Ruger.22LR.223 Remington.243 Winchester.270 Winchester.308 Winchester.300 Winchester Magnum.338 Winchester Magnum; 5.56×45mm NATO.30-06 Springfield; 7.62×39mm	2011	United States
Ruger M77		.220 Swift.22-250 Remington.243 Winchester.25-06 Remington.257 Roberts.264 Winchester Magnum.270 Winchester.284 Winchester.280 Remington.30-06 Springfield.308 Winchester.300 Winchester Magnum; 7mm-08 Remington; 7x57 Mauser; 7mm Remington Magnum.338 Ruger Compact Magnum.338 Winchester Magnum; 7.62x39mm.357 S&W Magnum.44 Remington Magnum	1968	United States
SIG Sauer 200 STR		.22LR; 6.5×55mm Swedish.308 Winchester; 7.62×51mm NATO	1990	Germany
Spielberg Brno 200F		6 mm Flobert; 6 mm Flobert BB	2002	Czech Republic
Steyr Model 1912 Mauser		7×57mm Mauser	1912	Austria-Hungary
Steyr Scout		5.56×45mm NATO.223 Remington.243 Winchester; 6.5 Creedmoor; 7mm-08 Remington; 7.62×51mm NATO.308 Winchester.376 Steyr.22LR.17 HMR.22 WMR	1999	Austria
Tubb 2000		6XC.22-250 Remington 6.5-284 Norma 7mm-08 Remington.308 Winchester	2000	United States
Voere S16		.223 Remington	2018	Austria
vz. 24		7.92×57mm Mauser; 7×57mm Mauser; 7.65×53mm Argentine	1924	Czechoslovakia
vz. 33		7.92x57mm Mauser; 7x57mm Mauser	1934	Czechoslovakia
Winchester Model 70		.22 Hornet.222 Remington.223 Remington.22-250 Remington.223 WSSM.225 Winchester.220 Swift.243 Winchester.243 WSSM.250-3000 Savage.257 Roberts.25-06 Remington.25 WSSM; 6.5×55mm.264 Winchester Magnum; 6.5mm Creedmoor.270 Winchester.270 WSM.270 Weatherby Magnum.280 Remington; 7mm Mauser; 7mm-08 7 mm Remington Magnum; 7mm WSM; 7mm STW.300 Savage.30-06 Springfield.308 Winchester.300 H&H Magnum.300 Winchester Magnum.300 WSM.300 Weatherby Magnum.300 RUM.325 WSM.338 Winchester Magnum.35 Remington.358 Winchester.375 H&H Magnum.416 Remington Magnum.416 Rigby.458 Winchester Magnum.470 Capstick	1936	United States
WKW Wilk		.50 BMG	2005	Poland
Zbroyar Z-008		7.62×51mm NATO	2007	Ukraine
Snipex Rhino Hunter		.50 BMG	2017	Ukraine
Snipex T-Rex		14.5×114mm	2017	Ukraine
Snipex Alligator		14.5×114mm	2020	Ukraine
MCR Horizon's Lord		.416 Barrett.460 Steyr .50 BMG 12.7×108mm12.7×114mm "HL"14.5×114mm23×115mm	2015	Ukraine

== Other firearm lists ==
- List of weapons
- List of firearms
- List of rifles
- List of machine guns
- List of submachine guns
- List of assault rifles
- List of battle rifles
- List of semi-automatic rifles
- List of carbines
- List of straight-pull rifles
- List of pump-action rifles
- List of multiple-barrel firearms
- List of pistols
- List of semi-automatic pistols
- List of revolvers
- List of sniper rifles
- List of shotguns
