= List of straight-pull rifles =

Straight-pull rifles differ from conventional bolt action mechanisms in that the manipulation required from the user in order to chamber and extract a cartridge predominantly consists of a linear motion only, as opposed to a traditional turn-bolt action where the user has to manually rotate the bolt for chambering and primary extraction. A straight-pull mechanism is also distinct from lever action and pump action mechanisms. Most straight-pull rifles have a striker firing mechanism (without a hammer), and models using a hammer usually have a comparably longer lock time than hammer-less mechanisms.

The Anschütz Fortner action used in biathlon is a good example of an ergonomical straight-pull rifle with good economy of motion and high operating speed. The action lever is located close to the trigger, and is accessed by slightly moving the index finger off the trigger. Pulling the lever rearwards ejects the spent casing. The bolt is then pushed forward using the thumb, upon which the firing hand lands naturally in the pistol grip so that the shooter is ready to fire immediately after completing the cycling.

== Fullbore ==
Name	Image	Cartridge(s)	Years produced	Country of origin
Mannlicher M1886		M86: 11×58mmR; M86-88: 8×52mmR	1886-1887	Austrian Empire; Kingdom of Hungary
Mondragón rifle		7×57mm Mauser	1887	Mexico
Mannlicher M1888		M88 8×52mmR; M88-90 and M88-95: 8×50mmR; M88/24: 8×57mm IS	1888-1896	Austrian Empire; Kingdom of Hungary
Mannlicher M1890 carbine		M90: 8×50mmR M90/24:8×57mm IS; M90/30, M90/31: 8×56mmR	1891-1896	Austrian Empire; Kingdom of Hungary
Schmidt–Rubin		7.5×53.5mm Swiss (GP90, GP 90/03, GP 90/23); 7.5×55mm Swiss (GP11)	1891-1958	Switzerland
M1895 Lee Navy		6 mm Lee Navy	1895	United States
Swiss Mannlicher M1893 carbine		7.5×53.5 mm Swiss (GP90)	1895-1905	Switzerland
Chiesanova rifle (prototype only)		7.65×53 mm Argentine	1895-	Argentina
Mannlicher M1895		8×50mmR Mannlicher; M95/30 & 31.M: 8×56mmR; M95/24 & M95M: 8×57mm IS	1896-1920	Austrian Empire; Kingdom of Hungary
M95M Trombone Conversion (Prototype, only 3 made).		Used in 6.5×55mm by John Larsen, 1952 Olympic Gold medalist in 100 meter running deer.	ca. 1950	Norway
Liegeoise 1888		7.65x53mm Mauser	1888	Belgium
Ross rifle		.303 British (7.70×56 mm R)	1903-1918	Canada
PAR-1		7.62×39mm	2002	Belgium
General Liu rifle		7.9x57mm S-Patrone	1914-1918	Republic of China
MTB 1925 (only prototype)		6.5x52mm Carcano	1925	Italy
K31		7.5×55mm Swiss	1931-?	Switzerland
Izhmash BO-59 (ru:БО-59)		7.62×54mmR	1959-1961	Soviet Union
Izhmash MBO-1 (ru:МБО-1)		5.6×39mm	1964-1972	Soviet Union
Izhmash MBO-2 (ru:МБО-2)		5.6×39mm	1965-1975	Soviet Union
L98A1 Cadet General Purpose Rifle (An L85A1 modified for army cadets by removing gas parts necessary for semiautomatic fire. The upgraded L98A2 retained semiautomatic, but not fully automatic, capabilities)		5.56×45mm NATO	1987-current	United Kingdom
Ruger Mini-14 Bolt-Action Only		.223 Rem	1988	United States
Blaser R93		.222 Remington to .500 Jeffery (also .22 LR kit)	1993-2016	Germany
Blaser R93 Tactical		7.62 NATO to .338 Lapua Magnum	1993-2017	Germany
Lynx 94		.222 Rem to .375 Ruger	1994-current	Finland
Heym SR 30		.308 Win to .375 Ruger	1996-current	Germany
Mauser M1996 (Model 96 / Model 96 S); Roessler Titan 16		.243 Win to .300 Win Mag	1996-1997; 2013-current	Germany / Austria
H&K R8		5.56 NATO, .223 Rem	1998-?	Germany
Sommer & Ockenfuss; SO Griffrepetierer		6mm BR to .416 Rem Mag	1998-2002	Germany
Sommer & Ockenfuss; M98 Geradezug		8×57mm	1998-2002	Germany
Browning Acera		.30-06 Springfield to .300 Win Mag	1999-2000	United States
VKS sniper rifle		12.7×55mm STs-130	2002	Russia
Strasser RS05		.222 Rem to .375 Ruger	2005-current	Austria
Blaser R8		.222 Remington to .500 Jeffery	2008-current	Germany
Bradley Arms BAR		.223 Rem	2008-current	Great Britain
Merkel RX Helix		.222 Rem to .300 Win Mag	2010-current	Germany
Interarms EX2		5.56×45mm NATO	1980s	United Kingdom
Lantac Raven		.223 Rem	2011-current	Great Britain
SGC Speedmaster		.223 Rem	2011-current	Great Britain
Rößler (Roessler) Titan 16		.243 Win through .375 Ruger.	2012-current	Austria
LMT LM308SP		.308 Win	2012-current	United States
LMT LM223SP		.223 Rem	2012-current	United States
Browning Maral		.308 Win to 9.3×62mm	2013-current	United States
Strasser RS14		.222 Rem to .375 Ruger	2014-current	Austria
Strasser RS SOLO		.222 Rem to .375 Ruger	2014-current	Austria
Strasser TAC 1		6.5 Creedmoor to .300 Win Mag	2014-current	Austria
POF ReVolt Light		.223 Rem	2014-current	United States
POF ReVolt Heavy		.308 Win	2014-current	United States
Warwick WFA1		.223 Rem, .300 BLK	2015-current	Australia
Chapuis ROLS		.243 Win to 9.3×62mm	2017-current	France
Saiga KSZ-223		.223 Rem	2017	Russia
Steel Action Hunting Short (HS)		.22-250 to .338 Federal	2017-current	Germany
Steel Action Hunting Medium (HM)		.270 Win to 9.3×62mm	2017-current	Germany
Innogun Integral		.308 Win to 9.3×62mm	2013	Germany
ADAR Ladoga		6.5mm Grendel, 7.6x39mm, and .366 TKM	2018-current	Russia
Schmeisser SP15		.223 Rem	2019-current	Germany
Kalashnikov TB2-LAW		.308 Win	2019 prototype	Russia
Savage Impulse		.22-250 Rem to .338 Lapua Magnum	2021-current	USA
Beretta BRX1		6.5 mm Creedmoor, .308 Winchester, .30-06 Springfield, .300 Winchester Magnum	2021-current	Italy
Haenel Jaeger NXT		.308 Winchester, .30-06 Springfield	2021-current	Germany
Oceania Precision SP15/SP15LR/SP25		.223 Rem, .300 BLK, .350 LGND, .308 Win, 6.5CM	2019-current	Australia

== Smallbore ==
Name	Image	Cartridge(s)	Years produced	Country of origin
Browning T-Bolt	Browning T-Bolt Sporter Maple .22 WMR	.22 Long Rifle, .17 HMR, .22 WMR	1965-1974; 2006-current	United States
Finnbiathlon		.22 Long Rifle	1976-1984	Finland
Izhmash Bi-7		.22 Long Rifle	1979	Soviet Union
Suhl 626/629	East German athlete using a grip-action straight-pull rifle, 1984	.22 Long Rifle	80's-?	Germany
Izhmash Bi-7-2	East German athlete using a toggle-action straight-pull rifle, 1980	.22 Long Rifle	1980-1983 (small scale); 1983-1991 (serial production) ?-until present (7-2-KO version)	Soviet Union
Musgrave Ambidex		.22 Long Rifle	1980's-1991	South Africa
Krico 360S		.22 Long Rifle	1991-?	Germany
Krico 360S2		.22 Long Rifle	1991-1996	Germany
Anschütz 1827 Fortner	German athlete using an Anschütz Fortner straight-pull rifle, 2009	.22 Long Rifle	1984-current	Germany
Izhmash Bi-7-3	An Izhmash Bi 7-3 toggle-action straight-pull rifle	.22 Long Rifle	1990's-current	Russia
Izhmash Bi-7-4		.22 Long Rifle	1991-current	Russia
Izhmash Sobol		.22 Long Rifle	1993-?	Russia
Izhmash SV99		.22 Long Rifle	1999-?	Russia
PWS T3 Summit		.22 Long Rifle	2011-2014	United States
ISSC SPA 22/17, Ninja, Scout SR		.22 Long Rifle, .17 HMR	2013-current	Austria
Anschütz Fortner 1727		.22 Long Rifle, .17 HMR, .17 HM2	2013-current	Germany
Steyr Scout RFR		.22 Long Rifle, .17 HMR, .22 WMR	2016-2018	Austria
Anschütz Fortner 1927 CISM		.22 Long Rifle	2016-current	Germany
Volquartsen Summit		.22 Long Rifle	2018-current	United States

== See also ==
- Biathlon rifle

=== Other firearm lists ===
- List of weapons
- List of firearms
- List of rifles
- List of machine guns
- List of bolt-action rifles
- List of submachine guns
- List of assault rifles
- List of battle rifles
- List of semi-automatic rifles
- List of carbines
- List of pump-action rifles
- List of multiple-barrel firearms
- List of pistols
- List of semi-automatic pistols
- List of revolvers
- List of sniper rifles
- List of shotguns
