= Lists of weapons =

This is an index of lists of weapons.

== By time period ==
=== Premodern-before 17th century ===
- List of surviving ancient ships
- List of medieval weapons

=== 17th century-19th century ===
- List of American Indian Wars weapons

==== 18th century ====
- List of ships captured in the 18th century
- List of infantry weapons in the American Revolution

==== 19th century ====
- List of American Civil War weapons
- List of weapons of the Philippine revolution
- List of weapons of the Spanish–American War
- List of firearms before the 20th century
- List of ships captured in the 19th century

=== 20th century ===
==== World War 1 era ====
- List of World War I weapons

==== Interwar period weapons ====
- List of Chaco War weapons
- List of Second Italo-Ethiopian War weapons(Ethiopia)
- List of Second Italo-Ethiopian War(Italy)
- List of Spanish Civil War weapons(Republican)
- List of Spanish Civil War weapons(Nationalist)

==== World War 2 era ====
- List of World War II weapons
  - List of World War II infantry weapons
  - List of World War II artillery

==== Cold War weapons in Cold War era ====
- List of Cold War weapons and land equipment of France
- List of Cold War weapons and land equipment of Italy
- List of Cold War weapons and land equipment of Spain
- List of Cold War weapons and land equipment of the United Kingdom
- List of Cold War weapons and land equipment of Sweden

==== Other war weapons in Cold War era ====
- List of Korean War weapons
- List of weapons in Malayan Emergency
- List of weapons of the Laotian Civil War
- List of weapons of the Portuguese Colonial War
- List of weapons of the Vietnam War
- List of weapons of the Rhodesian Bush War
- List of weapons of the Cambodian Civil War
- List of weapons of the Lebanese Civil War
- List of weapons of the Salvadoran Civil War
- List of weapons in the Falklands War

==== Post-Cold War era ====
- List of 20th-century weapons

== By type ==
- List of anti-aircraft weapons
- List of anti-aircraft guns
- List of anti-tank guns
- List of artillery
  - List of howitzers
  - List of infantry support guns
  - List of mortar carriers
  - List of mountain artillery
  - List of muzzle-loading guns
  - List of rocket artillery
  - List of tank guns
  - List of wheeled self-propelled howitzers
- List of daggers
- List of firearms
  - List of API blowback firearms
  - List of anti-materiel rifles
  - List of assault rifles
  - List of battle rifles
  - List of blow forward firearms
  - List of bolt-action rifles
  - List of bullpup firearms
  - List of carbines
  - List of clip-fed firearms
  - List of delayed blowback firearms
  - List of dual-feed firearms
  - List of grenade launchers
  - List of machine guns
  - List of man-portable anti-tank systems
  - List of most-produced firearms
  - List of multiple-barrel firearms
  - List of pistols
  - List of pump action rifles
  - List of recoilless rifles
  - List of revolvers
  - List of rifles
  - List of rocket launchers
  - List of semi-automatic pistols
  - List of semi-automatic rifles
  - List of shotguns
  - List of sniper rifles
  - List of straight-pull rifles
  - List of submachine guns
- List of flamethrowers
- List of martial arts weapons
- List of military rockets
- List of military vehicles
- List of missiles
  - List of anti-tank missiles
  - List of anti-ship missiles
  - List of cruise missiles
  - List of ICBMs
  - List of surface-to-air missiles
- List of practice weapons
- List of rockets
- Lists of swords
- List of types of spears
- List of torpedoes
- List of chemical weapons
- List of nuclear weapons

== By country ==
- List of artillery by country
  - List of naval guns by country
- List of missiles by country
- List of weapons of mass destruction by country

=== Argentina ===
- List of weapons of the Argentine Navy

=== Australia ===
- List of missiles of Australia

=== Austria-Hungary ===
- Weaponry of the Austro-Hungarian Empire

=== Czechoslovakia ===
- List of Czechoslovakia interwar period weapons

=== Denmark ===
- List of World War II weapons of Denmark

=== Europe ===
- List of indirect fire systems in production and in development by the European defence industry
- List of aircraft weapons in production and in development by the European defence industry

=== Finland ===
- List of World War II weapons of Finland

=== France ===
- List of World War II weapons of France
- List of equipment of the French Army

==== German Empire ====
- List of German weapons of World War I

==== Nazi Germany (World War 2) ====
- List of World War II weapons of Germany
- List of World War II torpedoes of Germany

==== Western Germany - Federal Republic of Germany (Cold War) ====
- List of weapons of West Germany

=== Ireland ===
- List of weapons used by the Provisional Irish Republican Army

=== Italy ===
- List of Italian submachine guns
- List of World War II weapons of Italy

=== Japan ===
- Lists of Japanese weapons and military equipment

==== Japanese Empire ====
- List of Japanese infantry weapons used in the Second-Sino Japanese War

=== New Zealand ===
- List of individual weapons of the New Zealand Defence Force

=== Norway ===
- List of Norwegian military equipment of World War II
  - List of World War II weapons of Norway

=== Spain ===
- List of military weapons of Spain
- List of World War II weapons of Spain

=== Sweden ===
- List of weapons of the Swedish Air Force

=== Switzerland ===
- List of World War II weapons of Switzerland
- List of equipment of the Swiss Armed Forces

=== United States ===
- List of crew-served weapons of the U.S. Armed Forces
- List of weapons of the U.S. Marine Corps
- List of active missiles of the United States military
- List of the United States Army weapons by supply catalog designation
- List of World War II weapons of the United States

=== United Kingdom ===
- List of aircraft and armaments of the Army Air Corps (United Kingdom)
- List of military weapons of the United Kingdom

=== Yugoslavia ===
- List of World War II weapons of Yugoslavia

== Weapons-related ==
- List of artillery
- List of chemical warfare agents
- List of 5.56×45mm NATO firearms
- List of 7.62×51mm NATO firearms
- List of 7.62×39mm firearms
- List of 7.62×54mmR firearms
- List of 7.92×33mm Kurz firearms
- List of 7.92×57mm Mauser firearms
- List of .30-06 Springfield firearms

== By weapons manufacturers ==
- List of modern Russian small arms and light weapons

=== by company ===
- List of ArmaLite rifles
- List of weapons developed by FN Herstal
- List of Heckler & Koch products
- List of Remington models
- List of Winchester Models
- List of Airspeed aircraft
- List of Beechcraft models

== By names ==
- List of torpedoes by name
- List of named weapons, armour and treasures in Germanic heroic legend (Germany)
- List of Filipino weaponry (Philippines)

== Fictional ==
- List of magical weapons
- List of mythological weapons
