= List of clip-fed firearms =

Below is a list of firearms regardless of form (IE: Pistol, Rifle, Machine gun etc) that fires ammunition fed from clips, in both en-bloc and stripper forms.

== Clip only (Internal/Fixed magazine) ==
Name	Type	Image	Cartridge	Country	Feed
Mannlicher M1886	Straight-pull rifle		11×58mmR; 8×52mmR	Austria-Hungary	En-bloc clip with permanent box magazine
M1870/87 Vetterli	Bolt-action rifle		10.4×47mmR; 6.5×52mm Carcano	Kingdom of Italy	Stripper clip with permanent box magazine
Carcano	Bolt-action rifle		6.5×52mm Carcano; 7.35×51mm Carcano; 6.5×54mm Mannlicher–Schönauer; 7.92×57mm Mauser; 6.5×50mmSR Arisaka	Kingdom of Italy	En-bloc clip with 6-round internal box magazine
Mosin-Nagant	Bolt-action rifle		7.62×54mmR	Russian Empire	Stripper clip with permanent 5-round box magazine
Schönberger-Laumann 1892	Semi-automatic pistol		7.8×19mm	Austria-Hungary	Stripper clip with permanent 5-round box magazine
Mannlicher M1894	Semi-automatic pistol		6.5×23mmR; 7.6×24mmR	Austria-Hungary	Stripper clip with internal 5-round magazine
Mannlicher M1895	Straight-pull rifle		8×50mmR Mannlicher; 8×56mmR; 7.92×57mm Mauser	Austria-Hungary	En-bloc clip with permanent box magazine
M1895 Lee Navy	Straight-pull rifle		6mm Lee Navy	United States	En-bloc clip with permanent 5-round box magazine
Mauser C96	Semi-automatic pistol		7.63×25mm Mauser; 9×19mm Parabellum	German Empire	Stripper clip with 10-round internal box magazine
Gewehr 98	Bolt-action rifle		7.92×57mm Mauser	German Empire	Stripper clip with 5-round internal box magazine
M1903 Springfield	Bolt-action rifle		.30-06 Springfield	United States	Stripper clip with internal 5-round or 20-round (Air Service variant) box magazine
Roth-Steyr M1907	Semi-automatic pistol		8mm Roth–Steyr	Austria-Hungary	Stripper clip with 10-round internal box magazine
Steyr M1912	Semi-automatic pistol Machine pistol		9×19mm Parabellum; 9×23mm Steyr	Austria-Hungary	Stripper clip with 8-round or 16-round (Machine pistol variant) internal magazine
M1917 Enfield	Bolt-action rifle		.30-06 Springfield	United States	Stripper clip with 5-round internal magazine
Type 11	Light machine gun		6.5×50mm Arisaka	Empire of Japan	Permanent 30-round hopper fed with ×6 5-round stripper clips
M1 Garand	Semi-automatic rifle		.30-06 Springfield	United States	En-bloc clip with 8-round internal magazine
Karabiner 98k	Bolt-action carbine		7.92×57mm Mauser	Nazi Germany	Stripper clip with 5-round internal magazine
SKS	Semi-automatic carbine		7.62x39mm	Soviet Union	Stripper clip with internal 10-round magazine

== Dual use (clip and magazine) ==
Name	Type	Image	Cartridge	Country	Feed
Mauser Model 1889	Bolt-action rifle		7.65×53mm Argentine	Belgium	Stripper clip with 5-round detachable box magazine
Lee-Enfield	Bolt-action rifle		.303 British	British Empire	Stripper clip with 10-round detachable box magazine
K31	Straight-pull rifle		7.5×55mm Swiss	Switzerland	Stripper clip with detachable 6-round box magazine
Mauser C96 M1932/M712 Schnellfeuer	Semi-automatic pistol		7.63×25mm Mauser; 9×19mm Parabellum	Weimar Republic	Stripper clip with 10 or 20-round detachable box magazine
Type 63	Assault rifle		7.62×39mm	China	Stripper clip with detachable 20-round box magazine
Ruger Mini-14	Semi-automatic rifle Assault rifle		.222 Remington.223 Remington.300 AAC Blackout; 5.56×45mm NATO; 7.62×39mm 6.8 SPC	United States	Stripper clip with detachable 20/30-round box magazines
