= 8x50mmR =

8×50mmR may refer to:

- 8×50R Lebel, a cartridge using smokeless powder
- 8×50mmR Mannlicher, a cartridge of Austria-Hungary from 1890
