= List of pump action rifles =

A pump action rifle is a rifle where the forend can be moved forward and backward in order to eject a spent round of ammunition and to chamber a new one. Pump-action mechanisms are often regarded as faster than a bolt action and somewhat faster than a lever action, as it does not require the trigger hand to be removed from the trigger while reloading. Most pump actions do, however, have a firing mechanism using a hammer, which leads to a longer lock time than the hammer-less mechanisms found on most bolt rifles. Furthermore, pump actions often have little or no mechanical leverage in order to aid in chambering and primary extraction, as opposed to a traditional turn-bolt action.

Name	Image	Cartridge(s)	Years produced	Country of origin				
Colt Lightning Carbine		Various	1884-1904	United States				
Winchester Model 1890		.22 Short, .22 Long, .22 Long Rifle, .22 Winchester Rimfire	1890-1941	United States				
Winchester Model 1906		.22 Short, .22 Long, .22 Long Rifle	1906-1932	United States				
Standard Arms Model M		.25 Remington.30 Remington.32 Remington.35 Remington	1909	United States				
Remington Model 14		.25 Remington, .30 Remington, .32 Remington,.35 Remington, .38-40 Winchester, .44-40 Winchester	1913–1934 (Model 14); 1914–1931 (Model 14-1/2); 1935–1950 (Model 141)	United States				
FN Trombone		.22 Short, .22 Long, .22 Long Rifle	1922-1974	Belgium				
Remington Model 121 Fieldmaster		.22 Short, .22 Long, .22 LR	1936-1954	United States				
Remington Model 760		Various, from 6mm Remington to .30-06 Springfield	1952-1981	United States				
SIG 550 VRB		.222 Rem, .223 Rem		Switzerland				
Remington Model 572		.22 Short, .22 Long, .22 LR	1954-current	United States				
Remington Model 572 Fieldmaster		.22 Short, .22 Long, .22 LR	1956-current	United States				
Izhmash MBO-3		5.6×39mm	1960s	Soviet Union				
Remington Model 7600		Various, from 6mm Remington to .30-06 Springfield	1981-2020	United States				
Spencer-Lee 1884			1884	United States				
IMI Timber Wolf		.38 Special / .357 Magnum, .44 Magnum	1985-1989.	Israel				
Crossfire MKI		.223 Remington, 12 Gauge	1989 (prototype); 1999-2001 (serial)	United States				
Browning BPR		.22 Long Rifle	1997-?	United States				
Remington Model 7615		.223 Remington	2005-2020	United States				
Innogun Impuls and Hybrid (with rifle or shotgun combination)		7 x 64.308 Win .30-06 8 x 57 IS 9,3 x 62	2010-current	Germany|-	Krieghoff Semprio	.223 Rem to .375 Ruger	2011-current	Germany
Troy PAR		.223 Remington, .300 AAC Blackout	2014-current	United States				
Verney Carron Impact LA		308win (discontinued) 30-06 Sprg 300 WIN MAG 35 Whelen 9,3x62mm	2014-current	France				
Saiga KSZ-223		.223 Rem	2017 (prototypes)	Russia				
ISSC PAR		.222 Rem, .223 Rem	2018-current	Austria				
Henry Pump Action Octagon		.22 Long Rifle, .22 WMR	?-current	United States				
SCSA Taipan Light/Taipan X/Taipan EVO/Taipan EVO Scout pump-action rifle		.223 Rem, .300 Blackout	2022-present	Australia				
Wedgetail Industries MPR pump-action rifle series (MPR-308, MPR Mini, and MPR Micro)		.308 Win (for MPR-308), .223 Rem, .300 Blackout	2023-present	Australia				
Winchester SXR2 Pump		.308 Win.30-06 Sprg .300 WM	2023-present	United States				

== See also ==
- List of weapons
- List of firearms
- List of rifles
- List of machine guns
- List of bolt-action rifles
- List of submachine guns
- List of assault rifles
- List of battle rifles
- List of semi-automatic rifles
- List of carbines
- List of straight-pull rifles
- List of multiple-barrel firearms
- List of pistols
- List of revolvers
- List of sniper rifles
- List of shotguns
