= Timberwolf rifle =

Timberwolf rifle may refer to:

- C14 Timberwolf, a sniper rifle
- IMI Timber Wolf, a pump-action carbine
