= Model 1863 =

Model 1863 may refer to:

- Springfield Model 1863, American rifles musket manufactured by Springfield Armory
- Model 1863 Percussion Contract Rifle, American rifle manufactured by E. Remington & Sons
- Model 1863 Infanteriegewehr, Swiss rifle made in Milbank-Amsler system
