= Primary extraction =

Firearms terminology

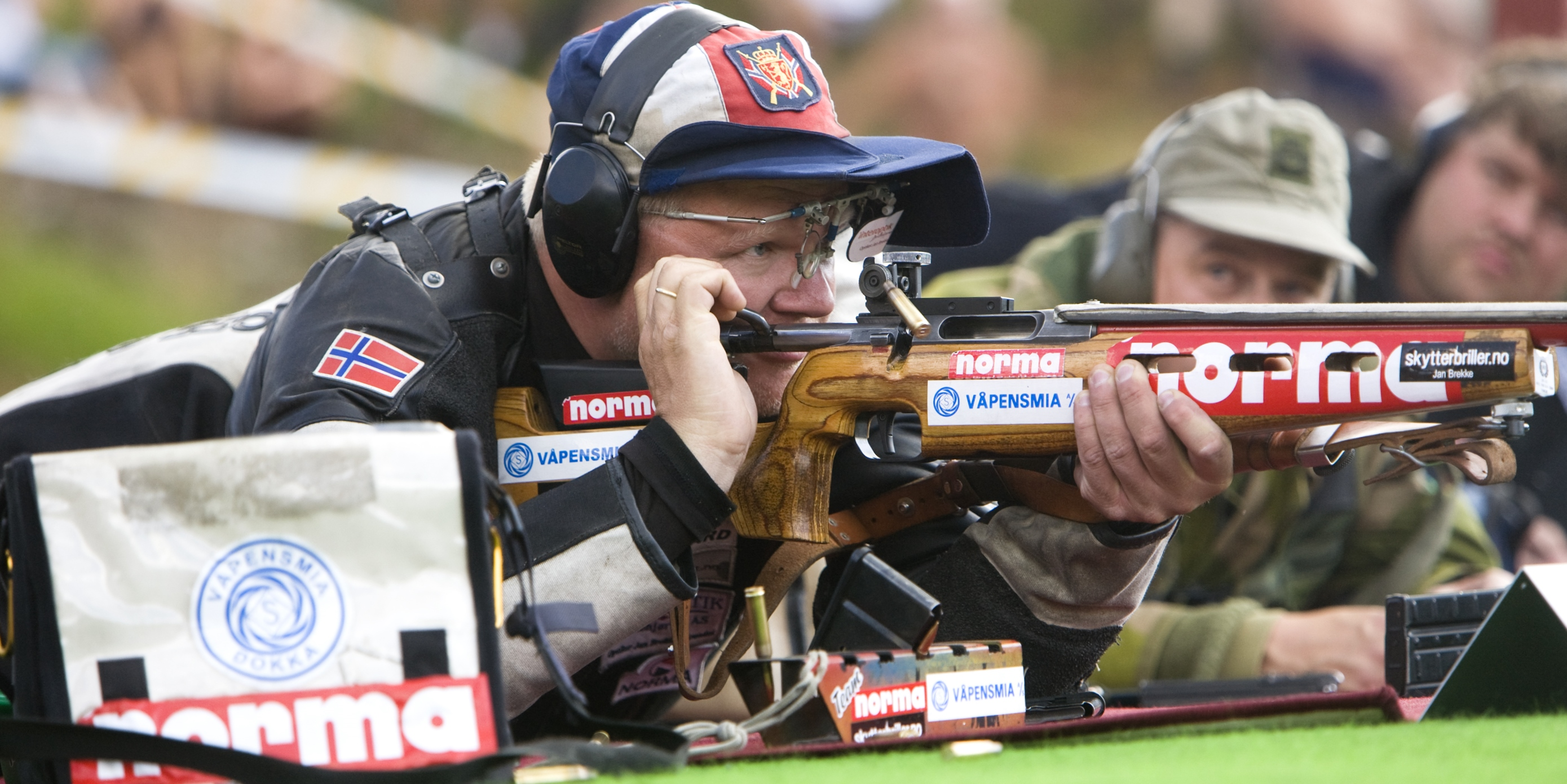
Bolt-action rifles utilize a rotating camming action as a mechanical advantage to aid primary extraction, followed by a linear motion in the secondary extraction.

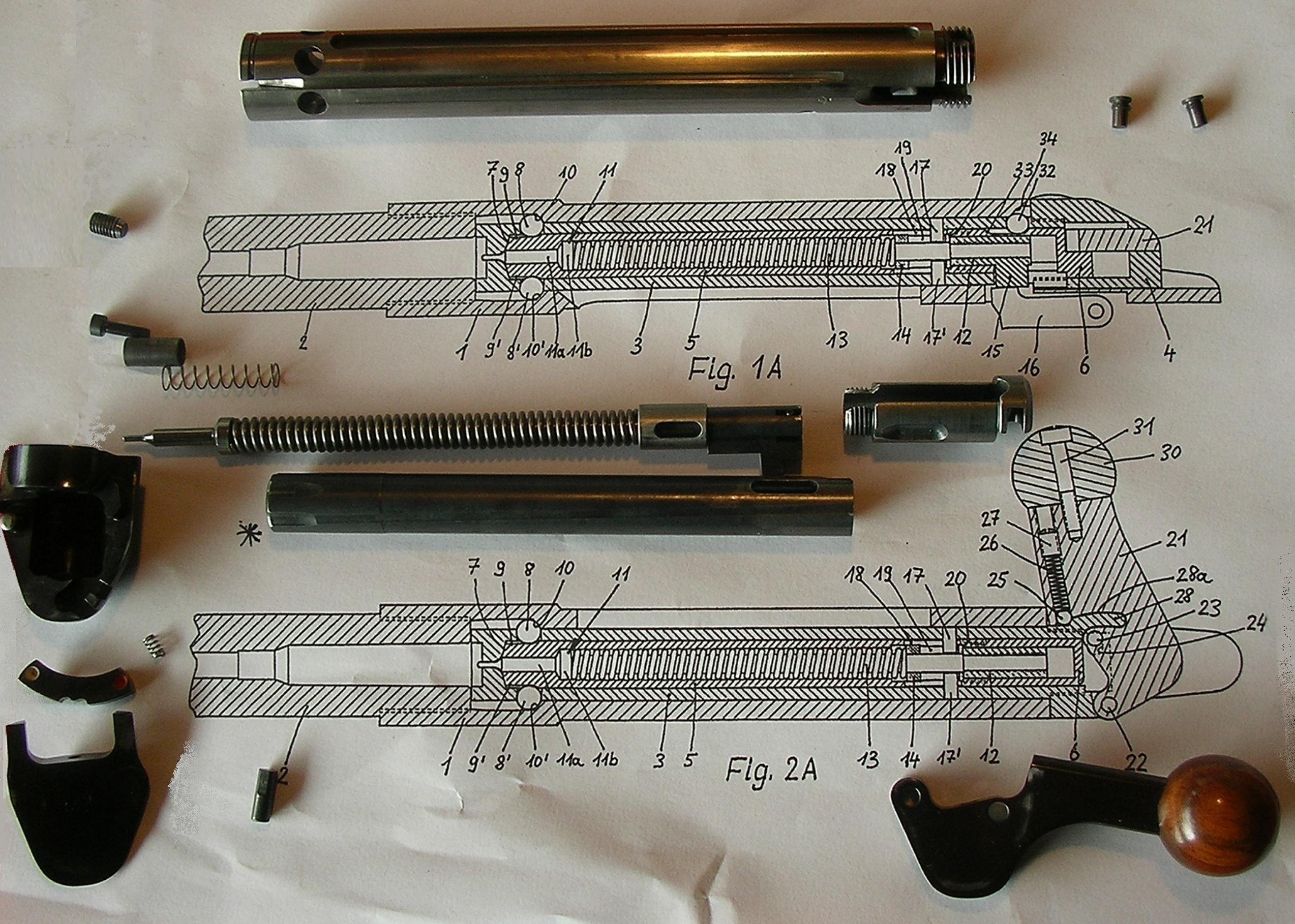
Disassembled bolt of the Heym SR 30.

In breechloading firearms, primary extraction is the initial phase (the first few millimeters) of the extraction of a spent casing from the firearm chamber. After the primary extraction comes the secondary extraction where the bolt is moved further backwards, and the extraction is then normally finished with the spent cartridge being ejected.

The first few millimeters of extraction tend to require a much higher peak force than the rest of the extraction due to the spent casing sticking against the chamber walls. The case is not chemically sticking as it still rotates with the bolt, gripped by the extractor claw on the rim. The mechanical sticking effect is a result from the case having expanded due to the high pressures during firing, and the extra initial force required can, depending on firearm design, make the extraction difficult for the user. Selfloading rifles usually don't have a separate motion for primary extraction, but instead depend on using a lot of force in order to start the extraction.

Different designs are used for ensuring reliable extraction in manual mechanisms, with most of them being based on the principle of mechanical advantage. The camming action seen in many bolt-action rifles is an example of mechanical advantage being used for chambering and extraction. There are examples of some firearm designs being less successful due to poor design around the primary extraction, which can result in a stuck case in the chamber. Notably some pump and straight pull mechanisms are perceived as having the advantage over bolt actions that they are faster and require fewer body movements to operate by the user, however, they are often more complex than traditional bolt action designs, and often have little or no primary extraction lacking the mechanical advantage of a turn bolt which can lead to stoppages. There are some examples of straight pull and pump action rifles notorious for having extraction problems.

The Blaser R8 straight-pull rifle design has been reported to have no issues with primary extraction. In this design, the bolt head moves in a purely linear motion, and except for the bolt handle cam when opening or closing the action, operation by the shooter is also purely linear. The Heym SR 30 is another successful straight-pull design which features a bolt with ball bearings as locking elements. Here the primary extraction is performed by retracting the bolt handle, which uses leverage from the opposite side of the bolt to swing the handle to the open position, giving a mechanical advantage.

== See also ==
- List of pump-action rifles
- List of straight-pull rifles
