= Schönberger-Laumann 1892 =

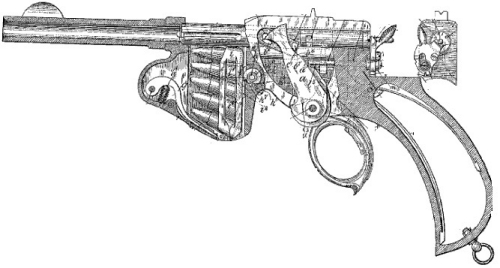
- Type: Semi-automatic pistol
- Place of origin: Austria-Hungary

Production history
- Designer: Joseph Laumann
- Designed: 1891
- Manufacturer: Œ.W.G.

Specifications
- Cartridge: 7.8x19mm
- Action: Blowback
- Feed system: 5-round internal magazine
- Sights: Iron sights

The Schönberger-Laumann 1892 is an early semi-automatic pistol, having received a patent in Austria in 25 November 1891, only a few months after the 11 July patent awarded to first semi-automatic design, the Salvator Dormus pistol. Austrian inventor Joseph Laumann modified his 8mm repeating pistol in 1892 to use a blowback actuated self-loading mechanism. The pistol retained the original large cocking lever attached to the underside of the frame in front of the trigger. Approximately thirty-five were manufactured before production ceased when the Austrian military rejected the design in 1896.

== See also ==
- List of clip-fed firearms
- List of front-magazine pistols
