= Remington Model 341 =

- Type: Rifle
- Place of origin: United States

Production history
- Designer: C.C. Loomis
- Designed: 1936
- Manufacturer: Remington Arms
- Produced: 1936 - 1940
- No. built: 131,604

Specifications
- Cartridge: .22 Long Rifle, .22 Short, .22 Long
- Action: Bolt Action Rifle
- Feed system: tubular magazine
- Sights: Iron

The Remington Model 341 is a bolt-action rifle designed and built by Remington Arms for four years prior to World War II.

== Design ==
The Model 341 is a conventional bolt-action, tube fed rifle. It is, in essence, an updated Model 34. Though conventional in layout and design, the Model 34 and 341 feature a patented lifter mechanism that presents cartridges to the chamber without the bullet touching rear of the chamber. This prevents damage to the bullet and conceivably increases accuracy potential.
