= IOF .315 sporting rifle =

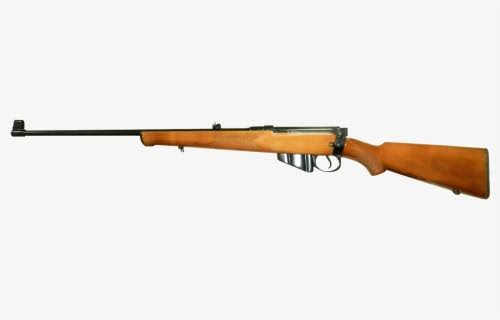
- Type: Bolt-action rifle
- Place of origin: India

Production history
- Produced: 1956

Specifications
- Mass: 3.34 kg (7.4 lb) (without magazine)
- Length: 1,117 mm (44.0 in)
- Barrel length: 640 mm (25 in)
- Cartridge: 8mm BSA (8×50 mmR Mannlicher)
- Action: Bolt-action
- Muzzle velocity: 610 metres per second (2,000 ft/s)
- Effective firing range: 275 metres (301 yd)
- Feed system: 5 round box type magazine
- Sights: Open sight with two leaves, graduated to 100 yd (91 m) and 300 yd (270 m); Riflescope can be fitted.

The IOF .315 sporting rifle is a civilian version of the British military Lee–Enfield rifle, chambered in the 8×50 mmR Mannlicher cartridge rather than the .303 British military cartridge due to Indian gun control laws.

The rifle is manufactured at Ordnance Factory Tiruchirappalli which manufactured Lee–Enfield rifles for the British colonial Indian Army and post-independence Indian forces. It's also made in Rifle Factory Ishapore.

It has a box-type magazine which holds 5 rounds and uses an 8 mm cartridge based on the 8x50 mmR Mannlicher, but is loaded with hunting-type bullets rather than military ones.

The Rifle has a modernised version, which has a wire folding stock, picatinny rails, a carrying handle and a skeletonized pistol grip. The factory has added sling swivels on the grip and at the base of the fore-end. The stock folds to the left via a push button on the right side.
