= List of 20th-century weapons =

This is a list of small arms used during the 20th century.

== Sidearms ==
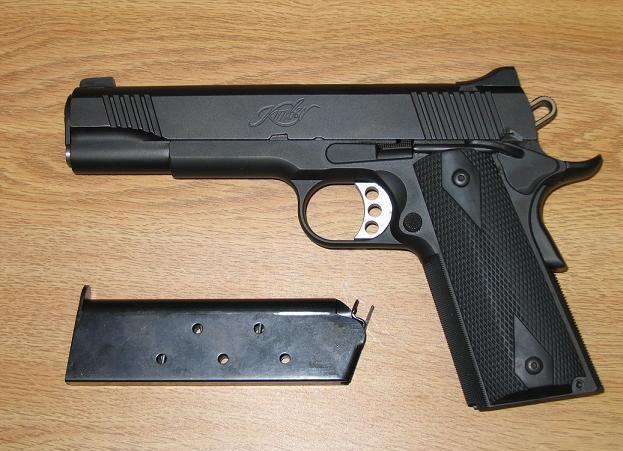
Kimber Custom TLE II M1911 pistol

- Mauser C96 (1875)
- Luger pistol (1898)
- Walther P38 (1938)
- PPK (1929)
- Beretta 92 (1975)
- Beretta 93R (1979)
- Jericho 941 (1990)
- Daewoo K5 (1989)
- M1911 (1911)
- Model 1902 Sporting (1908)
- Beretta 8000 (1994)
- Colt M1900 (1900)
- Colt Model 1902 Military (1902)
- Colt Model 1903 Pocket Hammerless (1903)
- Model 1905 Military
- Model 1907 Military
- Model 1909
- Model 1910
- Glock 17 (1982)
- Makarov PM (1989)
- Heckler & Koch USP (1973)
- Browning Hi-Power (1905)
- Steyr M Series (1999)
- M9 Pistol (1985)

== Submachine guns ==
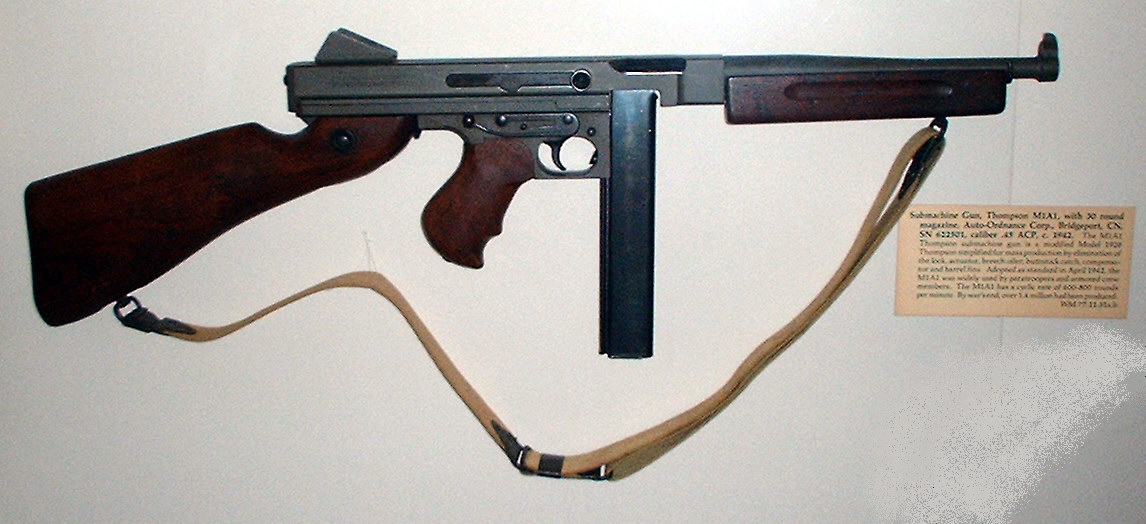
Thompson submachine gun, commonly associated with American gangsters

- Owen gun (1942–1960s) – Australian submachine gun used in World War II and subsequent conflicts until the 60s
- F1 submachine gun (1962–1991) – Australian submachine gun intended to replace the Owen gun
- Steyr AUG 9 mm (1977)
- FN P90 (1990–present) – Belgian personal defense weapon, a submachine gun but with a scaled down intermediate rifle cartridge
- MP 18 (1918–1945) – German submachine gun, world's first widely used and successful
- MP 28 (1928–early 1940s) – An improvement of the MP 18
- Steyr-Solothurn MP 34 (1930–1970s) – Often called "The Rolls-Royce of submachine guns", the Steyr-Solothurn MP 34 is based on the MP 28 made from the best quality materials available at the time
- MP 35 (1935–1945) – An improved submachine gun based on the MP 28
- MP40 (1940–1945 in Germany) – The MP 40 is a simplified MP 38, intended to replace older, more expensive submachine guns. This particular submachine gun is widely used by Germany in World War II
- Walther MP (1963–present) – Intended to rearm military and police forces positioned in West Germany, also used by the German Intelligence Service and some American troops stationed in the region
- HK MP5 (1966–present) – the most widely used submachine gun of the later half of the 20th century
- UZI (1954–present) – Israeli submachine gun, one of the first designs to implement a system to accommodate the magazine in the pistol grip
- PM-63 Rak (1965–present)
- Sten (1941–1960s in UK) – British submachine gun used extensively throughout World War II
- Sterling submachine gun (1944–present) – Designed as a replacement for the Sten in 1945 but only started its process in the 50s
- PPD-40 (1935–45) – The submachine gun used by the Russians before the implementation of the PPSh-41
- PPSh-41 (1941–1960s in USSR) – Russian submachine gun distinctive for its high rate of fire
- PPS (1942–1960s in USSR) – Family of submachine guns used alongside the PPSh family
- Thompson submachine gun (1938–1971 in USA) – Family of submachine guns designed in 1910 and onwards, The Thompson is a famous submachine gun commonly associated with American gangsters
- M3 submachine gun (1943–present) – A cheaper and lighter alternative to the Thompson submachine gun
- MAC 10 (1970–present) – Family of submachine guns, famous among media for their association with gangs
- American 180 (Designed in the 1960s, never implemented) – Chambered in 22 LR. It was described as being a "swarm of angry bees" shooting 1200 rounds per minute, it relied on shattering enemy armor through consistent and repetitive fire

== Automatic rifles ==
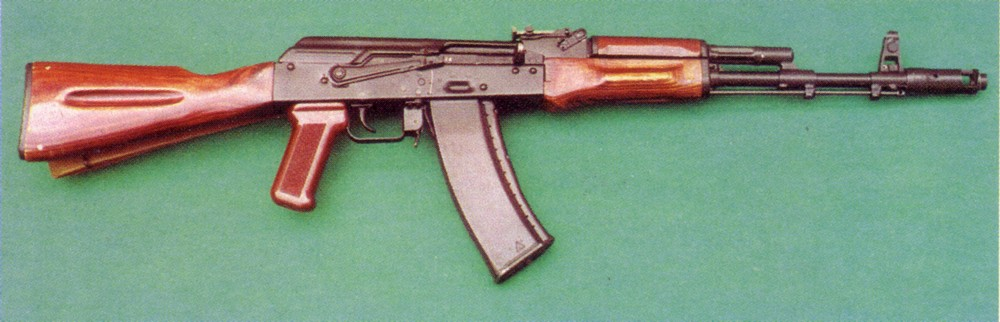
An AK-74, a typical assault rifle

- StG 44 – The first widely issued assault rifle in the world
- AK-47 – a famous Soviet automatic rifle whose derivatives have been used in almost every conflict since its invention in 1947
- AKM- an upgraded version AK-47. The stamped receiver drastically cut down production times, which allowed just about any country to manufacture it. The most common variant of this weapon; most rifles that are referred to as AK-47s are in fact AKMs.
- AKMS – a Paratroop model of the AKM with a folding stock
- AK-74 – a newer model of the AK series; it fired a newer and smaller round, the 5.45mm
- AKS-74 – a model of AK-74 designed for paratroopers
- AK-74M – updated version of AK-74
- FARA 83 – Argentinian automatic rifle
- Steyr AUG – an Austrian bullpup rifle
- Steyr ACR
- FN FNC
- IMBEL MD -Brazilian 5.56 rifle based on the FN FAL
- Diemaco C7 – a Canadian copy of the M16
- Type 56 assault rifle – Chinese AK-47 clone
- Type 68
- Chinese Type 81 Assault Rifle
- Type 86
- Type 95
- Daewoo K1 – Korean automatic rifle
- Daewoo K2 – standard rifle of the South Korean army
- APS-95
- GIAT FAMAS – bullpup rifle, standard issue of France
- Heckler & Koch HK33
- Heckler & Koch HK41
- Heckler & Koch G36- standard rifle of the German Army
- Heckler & Koch G11
- Enfield EM2 – prototype British automatic rifle that was never adopted
- L85 – standard bullpup of the British Army
- Madsen LAR
- IMI Galil
- Howa Type 89
- AR-10
- M16 rifle – standard-issue automatic rifle of the US
- CAR-15
- M4 carbine – standard carbine of the US
- Stoner 63
- Mini-14
- AR-16
- AR-18
- AR-100
- AN-94
- Ak 4
- Ak 5
- Rk 62
- INSAS
- SAR-21
- A-91
- AAI ACR
- XM29 OICW
- AAI SBR
- AAA Leader Dynamics SAC
- AAI XM70
- AEK-971
- AL-7
- AMD 65
- AMP-68
- AN11 TISS
- AN-94
- AO-63
- APS underwater rifle
- AR-11
- Arms-Tech COMPAK-16
- Arsenal AKSU
- Arsenal SLR-95
- Bernardelli VB-SR
- FN FAL

== Battle rifles ==
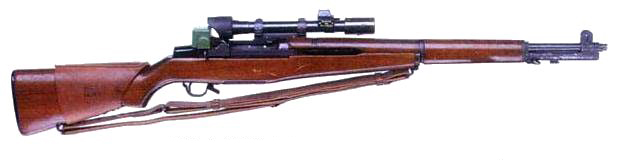
Scoped M1 Garand, a common battle rifle

- M1 Garand (1936–1958) – The standard rifle of the United States during the Second World War
- M1941 Johnson rifle (1941–1961 Worldwide) – A rare rifle issued to marine raiders early during the war
- M1903 Springfield rifle (1903–1975) – The standard-issue rifle of the U.S. in World War I it became a sniper weapon in the next world war
- M1917 Enfield rifle (1917–present worldwide) – A supplement for the M1903 during World War I
- MAS 36 (1936–present worldwide) – Standard rifle of the French in World War II
- Ross rifle (1905–1945)
- Gewehr 98 (1898–1935) – Standard rifle of Germany in World War I
- Karabiner 98k (1935–present) – Standard rifle of Germany in World War II, the smaller version of the Gewehrkarabiner98 (Gewehr 98)
- Lee–Enfield SMLE (MLE: 1895–1926/SMLE: 1904–present) – The standard rifle of the British Empire during the first half of the 20th century
- Carcano M91 (1891–present Worldwide)
- Arisaka type 38 (1906–1945)
- Arisaka type 99 (1939–1945)
- Mosin–Nagant (1891–present) – The standard Issue Russian/Soviet rifle for almost the entire first half of the 20th century
- K31 (1933–1958) – Standard Swiss rifle from 1933 to 1958
- SAFN 49 (1948–1982)
- ZH-29 (Uncertain time frame between its adoption and last use in military, presumably between early 1930s to mid 1950s)
- Hakim Rifle (1950s–early 1960s) – A slightly modified Ag m/42 rifle used by the Egyptian military
- Rasheed Carbine (1950s–early 1960s) – Egyptian carbine derived from the Hakim Rifle
- RSC M1917 (1917–1926) – Officially named Fusil Automatique Modèle 1917 by the French army
- MAS 49 (1951–1979)
- FG 42 (1943–1970s) – An automatic rifle built for German paratroopers
- Gewehr 43 (1943–1945) – Fairly successful semi-automatic German gun compared to the others, was designed from captured SVT-40
- SVT-40 (1940–present) – Widely issued Soviet semi-automatic rifle
- SVT-38 – (Subsection of article SVT-40)
- FN FAL (1953–present) – Designed in Belgium, widely adopted by NATO countries during the cold war
- Heckler & Koch G3 (1959–present Worldwide) – Used by the German military before the adoption of the G36
- M14 rifle (1959–present) – An upgrade from the M1, its use was limited since 1964
- SKS (1945–present)

== Sniper rifles ==
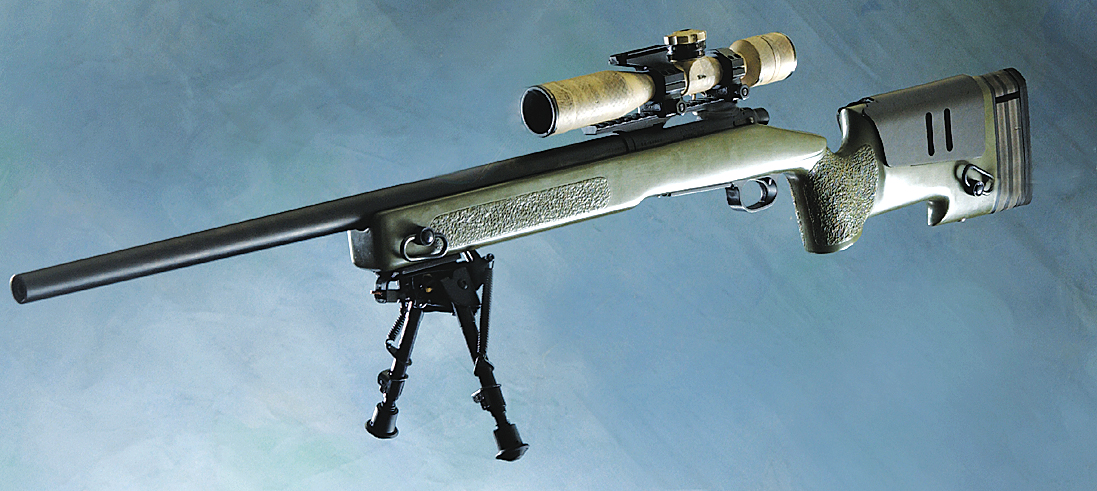
M40 rifle

- Dragunov SVD
- M21 rifle
- M40 rifle
- L96A1
- M82 Barrett rifle
- Heckler & Koch PSG1
- M24 Sniper Weapon System
- Steyr Scout
- Tabuk Sniper Rifle

== Machine guns ==
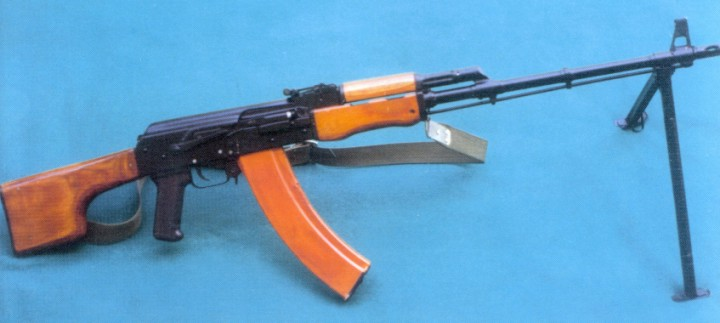
RPK-74

- Steyr AUG/HBAR
- FN Minimi
- FN MAG
- Type 67 GPMG
- MG34
- MG42
- MG3
- Bren light machine gun
- DPM
- RPD
- RPK
- PK machine gun
- IMI Negev
- Daewoo K3
- M1918 Browning Automatic Rifle
- M60 machine gun
- M2 Browning Machine Gun
- M249 light machine gun
- Stoner 63
- Mk 48 Mod 0 machine gun
- M2HB
- Type 100
- AAT Mod 52
- MG36
- Vickers machine gun
- Lewis gun

== Explosive devices ==
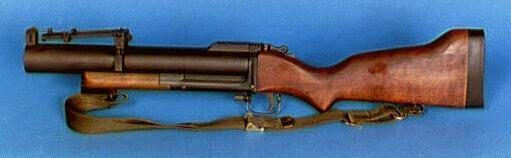
M79 grenade launcher

- Panzerfaust
- Panzerschreck
- M79 grenade launcher
- M203 grenade launcher
- M67
- Bazooka
- FGM-148 Javelin
- RPG-7
- Stinger
- GP-25 – mostly used Kalashnikov AKs
