= Remington Model 34 =

American bolt-action rifle

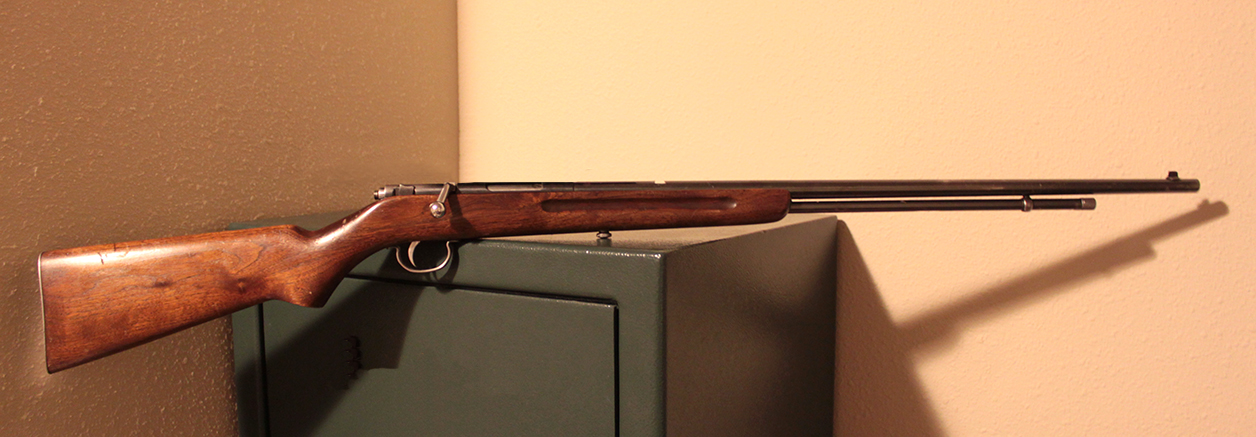
- Type: Rifle
- Place of origin: United States

Production history
- Designer: C.C. Loomis
- Manufacturer: Remington Arms
- Produced: 1932–1935
- No. built: 163,000
- Variants: Model 34 NRA

Specifications
- Barrel length: 24 in (61 cm)
- Cartridge: .22 Short, .22 Long, .22 LR
- Action: Bolt-action
- Feed system: Under-barrel tube magazine: 22-round (.22 Short); 17-round (.22 Long); 15-round (.22 LR)
- Sights: Bead front, open rear.

The Remington Model 34 is a bolt-action rifle that was manufactured by Remington Arms from 1932 until 1935.

== Design ==
The Model 34 is a conventional bolt-action, tube fed rifle. Though conventional in layout and design, the Model 34 and 341 feature a patented lifter mechanism that presents cartridges to the chamber without the bullet touching rear of the chamber. This prevents damage to the bullet and conceivably increases accuracy potential. Remington updated the Model 34 and the Model 341 replaced it in the product line.

== Variants ==
Model 34 NRA
Similar to the regular model, the Model 34 NRA variant had a Patridge front, a Lyman 55R aperture sight, and a sling to carry the rifle.
