= List of missiles of Australia =

This list of missiles of Australia documents missiles and precision munitions that the Australian Defence Force deploys now or intends to procure in the future.

== Australian Army ==
| Model | Image | Origin | Range | Speed | Notes |
Rocket artillery
| GMLRS | | United States | 70km+ | Supersonic (Mach 2.5) | In service; 2000+ ordered, local production from 2025. |
Short-range ballistic missile
| ATACMS | | United States | 300km+ | Supersonic (Mach 3) | In service; 10 ordered in 2023. |
| PrSM | | United States Australia | 500km | Supersonic (Mach 3+) | In service from 2025; collaborative partner. Increment 1 confirmed, Local production planned. At least 5 Inc 1 delivered. |
Anti-tank guided missile
| Javelin | | United States | 2.5km | 1,140km/h | Operated since 2001. 686 FGM-148B-D. 200 FGM-148E. 605 FGM-148F. |
| Spike-LR-2 | | Israel | 5.5km | 900km/h | Purchased in 2023. 40 delivered out of an unknown amount ordered. |
Helicopter Weaponry
| WGU-59 APKWS | | United States | 5km | 1,000m/s | Purchased in 2016. 3,000: 1,000 for ARH Tiger and MH-60R, 2,000 for AH-64E. |
| AGM-114 Hellfire-2 | | United States | 11km | Supersonic (Mach 1.3) | Purchased in 2006. 500 ordered for ARH Tiger, 600 for MH-60R, 800 ordered with AH-64E. |
Air defence
| MIM-120C-7/8 AMRAAM | | United States | 90km | Supersonic (Mach 4) | First ordered in 2019. For use on Australian NASAMS III. 218 MIM/AIM-120C-7, 400 AIM-120D or MIM/AIM-120C-8. Likely shared between RAAF and Army stocks. |
| MIM-9X Sidewinder | | United States | 35km | Supersonic (Mach 2.5) | First ordered in 2008 (RAAF). For use on Australian NASAMS. 216, likely shared between RAAF and Army stocks. |
Possible future procurements
| David's Sling | | Israel | 300km | Hypersonic (Mach 7) | Possible future procurement for Australia's Medium-Range Air Defence capability. Missile defence system. |

== Royal Australian Navy ==
| Model | Image | Origin | Range | Speed | Notes |
Land-attack missile
| Tomahawk | | United States | 2,500km | Subsonic (Mach 0.7) | First used in 2024; 200+ ordered. |
Multi-purpose missiles
| Naval Strike Missile | | Norway | >250km | Subsonic (Mach 0.9) | Utilised for land-attack and anti-ship. At least 5 delivered in 2024. |
Anti-ship missile
| Harpoon | | United States | 220km | Subsonic (Mach 0.7) | Being phased out in favour of Naval Strike Missile. First ordered in 1976. 64 RGM-64L ordered in 2002 for Anzac-class FFHs. 25 ordered in 2017. |
Surface-to-Air Missiles
| RIM-174 Standard ERAM | | United States | 500km | Supersonic (Mach 3.5) | Utilised for land attack, anti-ship, anti-air and missile defence; first deployed in 2024. |
| RIM-162 ESSM | | Consortium | 50km+ | Supersonic (Mach 4) | Block I (SARH) ESSM being phased out in favor of Block II (ARH) ESSM. 70 Block 2 ESSM delivered out of unknown amount ordered (10 in 2022, 20 per year subsequently). 100 RIM-162A Block 1 (AEGIS-capable), 400 RIM-162B Block 1 (non-AEGIS-capable). |
| SM-2MR/Block IIIC | | United States | 170km | Supersonic (Mach 3.5) | First ordered 2005. 175 arm-launched SM-2 Block 3A transferred to Chile with Adelaide-class frigates. 80 SM-2 Block 3B (Mark 41 VLS-capable) ordered in 2016. Unknown amount of SM-2 Block 3C ordered in 2025. |

== Royal Australian Air Force ==
| Model | Image | Origin | Range | Speed | Notes |
Air defence
| AIM-120B/C/D AMRAAM | | United States | 90-160km | Supersonic (Mach 4) | First ordered in 2000. 218 MIM/AIM-120C-7, 400 AIM-120D or MIM/AIM-120C-8, 450 AIM-120D-3. 250 AIM-120B likely retired. C-7s and C-8s likely shared between RAAF and Army stocks. |
| AIM-9X Sidewinder | | United States | 35km | Supersonic (Mach 2.5) | First ordered in 2008. 216, likely shared between RAAF and Army stocks. |
Land-attack missile
| AGM-158 JASSM | | United States | >300km | Subsonic (Mach 0.85) | For use with F-35A Lightning II and F/A-18F Super Hornet. 260 AGM-158A. |
| AGM-88E AARGM | | United States | 150km | Supersonic (Mach 2) | First ordered 2015. 141 AGM-88E and -88E-2. |
Glide bomb/General-purpose bomb
| AGM-154 JSOW | | United States | 130km | 960km/h | 50 AGM-154C and -154C-1. |
| JDAM (multiple variants) | | United States | 28km+ | | |
| GBU-53/B StormBreaker | | United States | 114km+ | | For F-35A Lightning II. 3,900 ordered, unknown amount delivered. |
| GBU-39 SDB | | United States | 114km+ | | For F-35A Lightning II. 2,950 ordered, unknown amount delivered. |
| BLU-111(AUS)B/B | | Australia | 28km+ | | Domestically produced by Thales Australia; introduced in 2022. Variant of JDAM. |
Anti-ship missiles
| AGM-158C LRASM | | United States | 920km+ | Subsonic | For F/A-18F Super Hornet. 200 ordered, unknown amount delivered. |
Future procurements
| AGM-158B-2 JASSM-ER | | United States | >1000km | Subsonic | For use with F-35A Lightning II and F/A-18F Super Hornet. 80 ordered. |
| Joint Strike Missile | | Norway | 555km | Subsonic | Will be introduced for service with F-35A Lightning II, and will be manufactured in Australia. |
| Hypersonic Attack Cruise Missile | | Australia United States | 1,900km | Hypersonic (Mach 8) | For use with F-35A Lightning II, F/A-18F Super Hornet, EA-18G Growler and P-8 Poseidon. Slated for introduction after 2027. |
| AGM-88G AARGM-ER | | United States | 300km | Supersonic (Mach 3) | First ordered in 2024. For internal use on F-35A Lightning II. 63 ordered. |
| AIM-260 JATM | | United States | >200km | Supersonic (Mach 5) | First ordered in 2025. For use on F-35A Lightning II. Predicted service entry of 2031-2032. |
