= Jägergewehr 1856/59 =

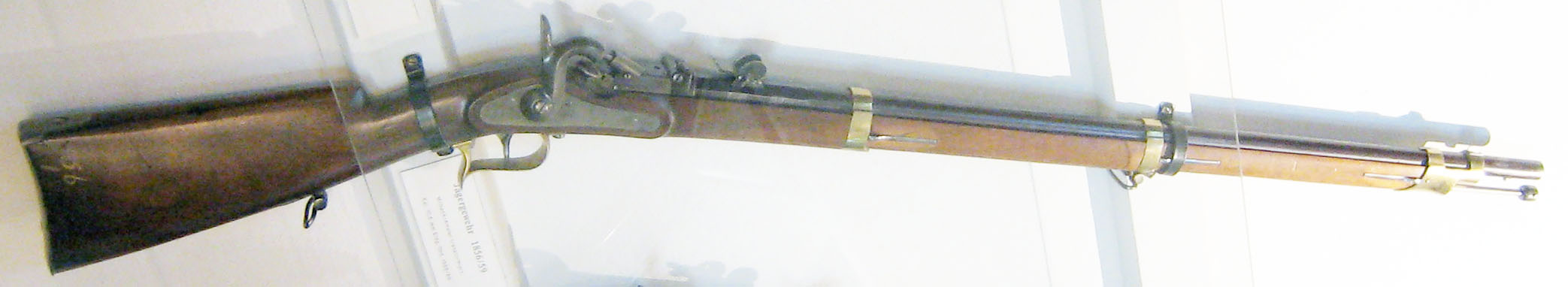
- Type: Service rifle
- Place of origin: Switzerland

Service history
- In service: Never issued
- Used by: Swiss Army

Production history
- Manufacturer: Beuret Frères à Liège
- No. built: 14,000

Specifications
- Mass: 4300 g
- Length: 1320 mm
- Barrel length: 930 mm
- Caliber: 10.5 mm
- Action: Caplock
- Feed system: Muzzleloader
- Sights: Iron sights (Quadrantenvisier)

The Jägergewehr 1856/59 (English: Jäger rifle 1856/59), originally designed in 1853, was intended to be a service rifle for use by the Swiss armed forces. It was one of the first pure infantry weapons to feature a rifled barrel. However, by the time all 14,000 procured weapons were delivered in 1860, they were already perceived as obsolete and were never issued to the troops.
