= Mannlicher M1888 =

Repeating Rifle Muster 1888
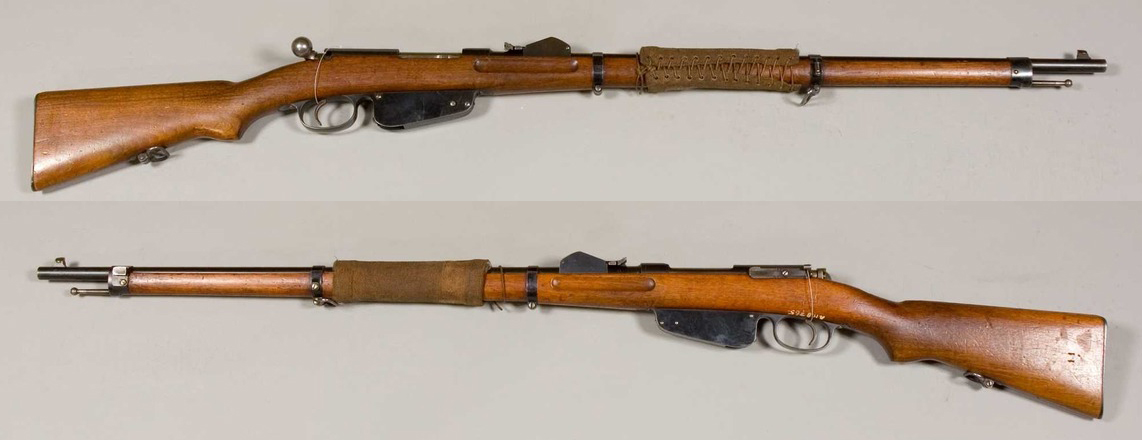
- Mannlicher M1888 rifle, from the collections of the Swedish Army Museum.
- Type: Bolt-action rifle
- Place of origin: Austria-Hungary

Service history
- In service: 1888–1945
- Used by: See Users
- Wars: Chilean Civil War; Federalist Revolution; First Sino-Japanese War; Philippine Revolution; International intervention on the island of Crete; Boxer Rebellion; Second Boer War; Xinhai Revolution; First Balkan War; Second Balkan War; World War I Russian Civil War; Austro-Slovene conflict in Carinthia; Revolutions and interventions in Hungary; Hungarian–Czechoslovak War; Polish–Ukrainian War; Retaking of Czech Borderland (1918-1919); Polish–Czechoslovak War; Polish–Soviet War; Greco-Turkish War; Pacification of Libya; Second Italo-Ethiopian War; Spanish Civil War; Sudeten German uprising 1938; World War II (limited); Greek Civil War; 1948 Palestine war

Production history
- Designer: Ferdinand von Mannlicher
- Designed: 1887–1888
- Manufacturer: Steyr-Mannlicher, Fegyver És Gépgyár
- Produced: 1888–1896
- No. built: 1,095,000
- Variants: M1888-90, M1888-95, M1888/24

Specifications (M88)
- Mass: 4.41 kg (9.7 lb)
- Length: 1,280 mm (50 in)
- Barrel length: 765 mm (30.1 in)
- Cartridge: M88 8×52mmR; M88-90 and M88-95: 8×50mmR; M88/24: 8×57mm IS
- Action: Straight-pull bolt action
- Muzzle velocity: 530 metres per second (1,700 ft/s) with M1888 ball cartridge
- Feed system: 5-round en-bloc clip (stripper clip in M88/24), integral box magazine
- Sights: Iron sights

Within military 8 mm firearms, the Repeating Rifle Mannlicher 1888, better known as the Mannlicher M1888, was a bolt-action rifle used by several armies from 1888 to 1945. Derived from the M1885 and later M1886 models, it was Ferdinand Mannlicher's third rifle that utilized the "en bloc clip".

It was succeeded by the Mannlicher M1895 as the standard service rifle of the Austro-Hungarian Army. The M95 uses a more secure rotating-bolt, in contrast to the M88's wedge-lock bolt.

== History ==
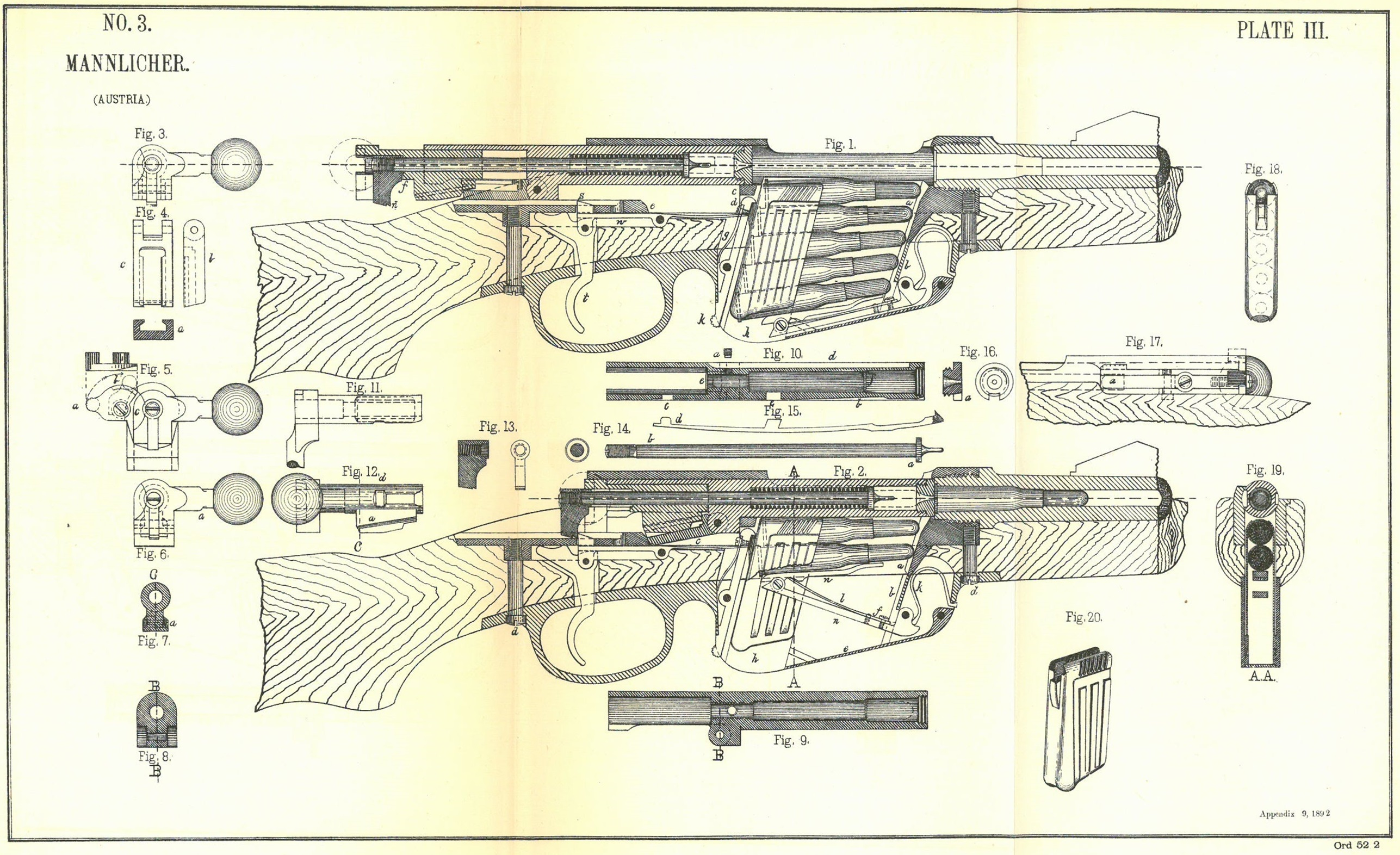
Mannlicher M1888 mechanism

The M1888 was a direct and immediate descendant of the M1886 Austrian Mannlicher. This rifle too was a straight-pull, bolt-action, box magazine repeater. As early as the beginning of production of the M1886 the need and desirability for a small-bore rifle was evident. This rifle is virtually identical to its predecessor but for chambering a newly designed 8 mm cartridge, loaded originally with black powder and denominated 8×52mmR.

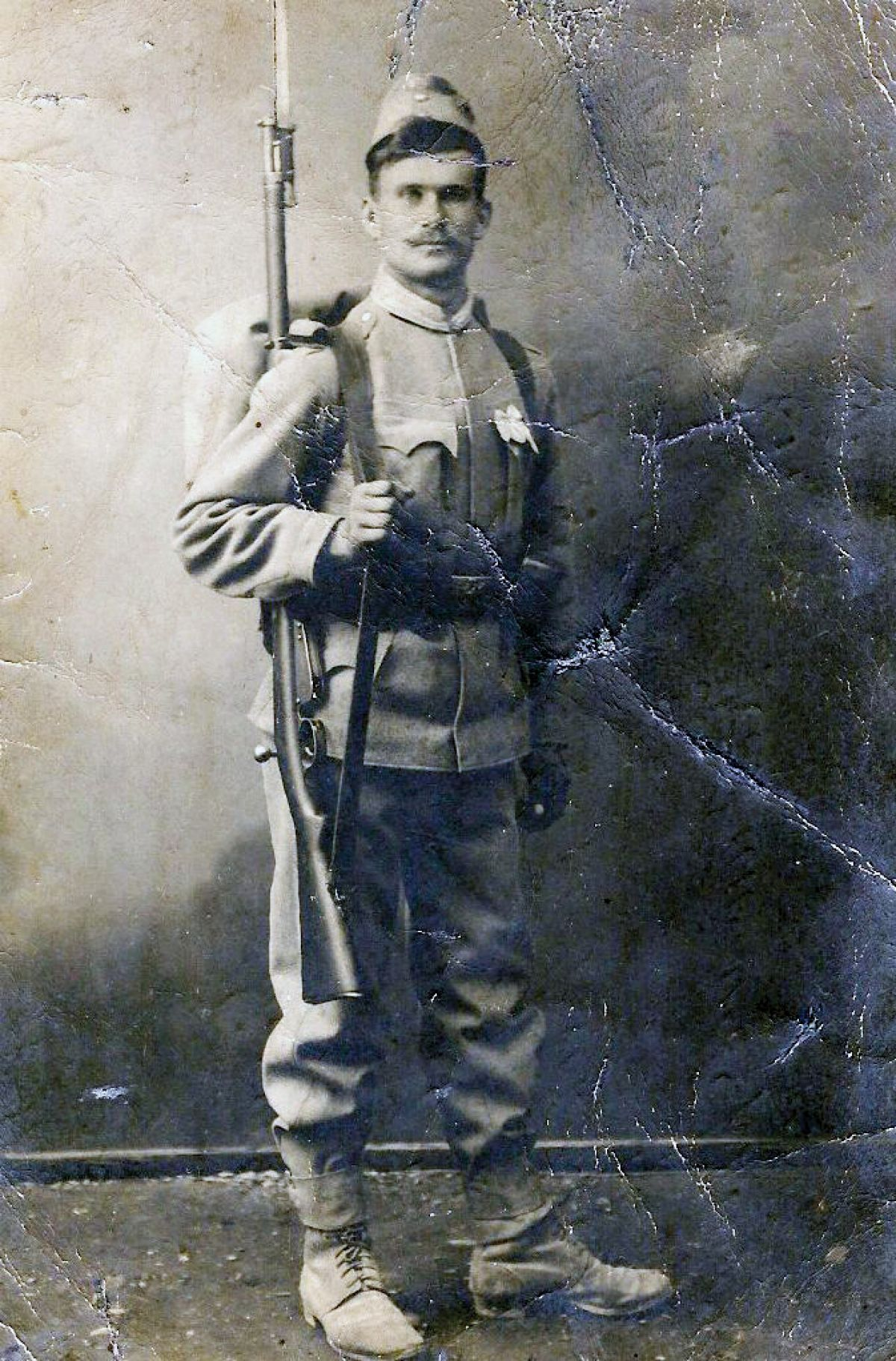
A Slovene soldier of the Austro-Hungarian Common Army posing with his M1888 service rifle and fixed bayonet

=== M1888-90 rifle ===
Shortly thereafter, the M88 cartridge was converted to semi-smokeless powder. The new cartridge was designated 8mm M.1890 Scharfe Patrone and its dimensions were 8×50mmR. The sights of existing black powder 8mm Mannlicher rifles were converted to accommodate semi-smokeless ammunition by the functional arrangement of screw mounting re-graduated sideplates onto the outsides of the existing rear sight walls. The converted rifles were denominated M.88–90.

=== M1890 rifle ===
When in 1890 semi-smokeless powder became available, manufacture of rifles with a longer and thus stronger chamber and modified sights began. Although the smokeless powder filled M.93 8×50mmR cartridge can be used in this rifle, the generated pressure at 40,000 psi (275.8 MPa) is marginal, as the wedge-lock bolt system this rifle uses was originally designed to be shot with less-potent black powder filled with 11×58mmR ammunition.

=== Kuaili 1888 Kiangnan rifle 7.62x55 ===
China also used this rifle extensively during the Qing dynasty and the Republican era. China first bought Mannlicher 88 rifles before the First Sino-Japanese War in 1894–1895 and after that started production of the unlicensed Kuaili 1888 Kiangnan copy. These rifles use a proprietary 7.62x55mmR cartridge but purportedly will accept 7.62x54mmR ammunition without issue.

=== M1888-95 rifle ===
During WW1, M.88-90 rifles were pulled from storage and used alongside the newer M90 and M95s, but due to their age and lack of maintenance were often worn and had corroded barrels. Many that were sent in for repair were rebarrelled and given the newer M95 rear leaf sights, as well as a wooden handguard to bring them up to a similar standard (some M.88/90s received the handguard but retained their quadrant sights-Bulgaria in particular was more consistent in adding handguards to their M.88 rifles).

Note that the M.88-95 designation is a collector's term, as these did not appear to be separated from unmodified M.88-90 rifles. Many surplus M.88-90 and M.88-95 handguards are also missing-the new handguards were fitted over the existing barrel bands using only spring clips, and thus are prone to being damaged or lost as they were less durable (the same is true of original M91 handguards).

=== Semi-auto conversion ===
Circa 1918 Bulgaria converted about 1,200 M88/90s to be semi automatic and to feed from 20 round detachable box magazines with support of a bipod. Most were destroyed by the Military Inter-Allied Commission of Control after 1920 and are a rare piece today.

=== M1888-18 carbine ===
During the final years of WW1, Bulgaria would cut down a small number of M.88-90 rifles to carbine length. These were retained long enough that many were converted to 8x56mmR Mannlicher in the interwar period.

=== M1888-24 short rifle ===
In the interwar period, a number of nations had a variety of rifles in their inventory, including a variety of Mannlicher rifles such as the M.95 and M.88-90. In the mid-1920s, both Greece and Serbia would convert most of their available Mannlicher rifles to a new short rifle pattern similar to their Mauser rifles, giving them new handguards and rear sights as well as rechambering them to 7.92x57mm Mauser.

Both nations would rechamber M.95s to the M.95/24 pattern (sometimes called the M.95M) but M.88-90 rifles were also converted to a similar pattern. It's not clear which nation, if both, did the M.88s; in any case it is generally not recommended to fire these rifles with full power ammunition as the 8x57mm cartridge generates much higher pressures than 8x50mmR.

== Users ==
- Austria-Hungary
- First Austrian Republic
- Boers
- Kingdom of Bulgaria: Some cut down in 1918. Remaining carbines converted to 8x56 in interwar years.
- China
- Brazil: Both sides during the Federalist Revolution.
- Republic of China (1912–28)
- Chile
- Czechoslovakia
- Sudeten German Party
- Ecuador
- Ethiopian Empire: Some M88/90s would be cut-down to carbine length. These are functionally identical to standard M88/90s.
- Nazi Germany: Used by Volkssturm.
- Kingdom of Greece: Captured from Bulgaria during the Second Balkan War and at the end of World War I. Possibly converted to 8mm Mauser.
- Haganah
- Kingdom of Hungary: 11,000 left in inventory by 1940
- India
- Philippines
- Second Polish Republic: Leftover rifles from units serving under Austria-Hungary. Many sold off to Republican Spain in the late 1930s.
- Kingdom of Romania: Before Second Balkan War Romania bought circa 60,000 Mannlicher M.90 and M.95. During World War I a number of M.88-90 and M.90 Mannlichers were captured from Bulgarian and Austria-Hungarian forces. Others were provided as reparations after the war. They were still in use with rear echolon units during World War II.
- Russian Empire
- Soviet Russia
- Kingdom of Serbia: Captured from Austria-Hungary during WW1.
- Kingdom of Siam: According to Steyr sales records, 15,000 M1888 rifles were furnished to Siam, most in the 1890s. Some may have been used items, sold from Austrian military stocks.
- Spain
- Second Spanish Republic: Received as aid from Poland during the Spanish Civil War.
- United Kingdom: Captured in Ethiopia, used by African or Indian troops in Garrison/Guard duties in Abyssinia in the 1941-42 period, and then ended up (along with all the rest of the captured Equipment) in India, the more modern rifles (M95s and Carcanos) and MGs, going to front line training ( Burma Front) and the rest (like M88) to straight training units and guard duty in the boonies of India.
- Kingdom of Yugoslavia: Leftover captures or reparations from WW1. Possibly converted to 8mm Mauser.
