= IMI Timber Wolf =

- Type: Hunting pump-action rifle
- Place of origin: Israel

Specifications
- Mass: 5.5 to 6.1 pounds
- Barrel length: 18 inches
- Cartridge: .38 Special / .357 Magnum, .44 Magnum
- Action: Pump action
- Feed system: Tube magazine

The Timber Wolf pump-action carbine was designed by Evan Whildin and was produced by Israeli Military Industries, ending in 1989 and is no longer produced. This is one of few modern rifles chambered for revolver cartridges such as the .357 Magnum and the .44 Magnum. Less than 1000 were imported to the United States. A single prototype was made in .32-20.

== Timber Wolf Specifications ==
Caliber(s)	.357 Magnum/.38 Special OR .44 Magnum
Length	Overall - 37" (940mm)
	With stock removed - 24.4" (620mm)
	Barrel - 18.5" (470mm)
Weight	6.1 lbs. with empty magazine (2.75 kg)
Action Type	Pump/slide action
Capacity and Magazine Type	.357 - 10 rounds, Tubular Magazine
	.44 - 10 rounds, Tubular Magazine
Rifling	.357 - Right hand, 10 groove, 1 turn in 20 inches
	.44 - Right hand, 10 groove, 1 turn to 25 inches
Sights	Front - Fixed
	Rear - adjustable 55, 110, 165, 220, 275 yards (50, 100, 150, 200, 250 meters)

== See also ==
- Colt Lightning Carbine (1884-1904), another revolver-cartridge carbine
