= Infanteriegewehr 1863 =

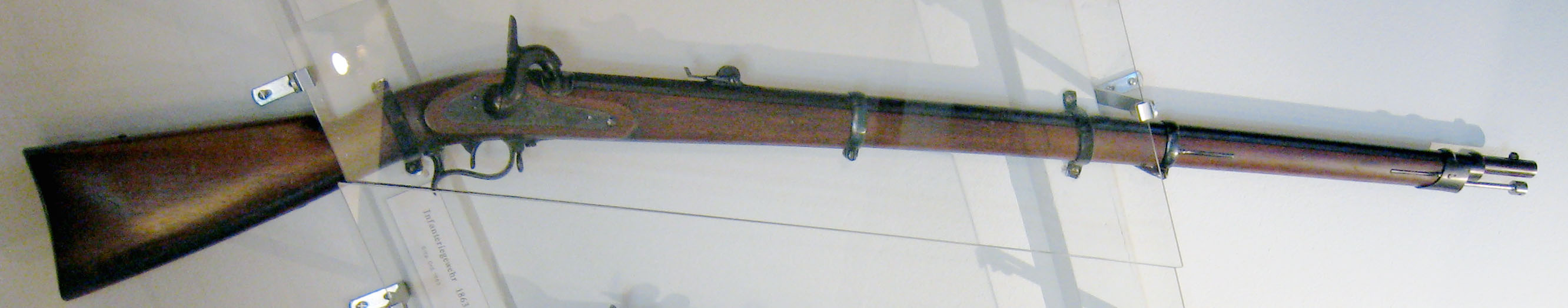
- Type: Service rifle
- Place of origin: Switzerland

Service history
- In service: 1863 – c. 1890s
- Used by: Swiss Army

Production history
- Manufacturer: Various Swiss manufacturers
- No. built: 80,000
- Variants: Infanteriegewehr 1863/67

Specifications
- Mass: 4600 g
- Length: 1380 mm
- Barrel length: 990 mm (63), 926 mm (67)
- Caliber: 10.5 mm
- Action: Caplock
- Feed system: Muzzleloader, then breechloader retrofit
- Sights: Iron sights (Quadrantenvisier)

The Infanteriegewehr 1863 (English: Infantry rifle 1863) was the first Swiss army service rifle to feature a rifled barrel. Like other Swiss infantry weapons of the period, it was retrofitted with a Milbank-Amsler breechloading system from 1867 on.
