= 8×52mmR Mannlicher =

Rifle cartridge

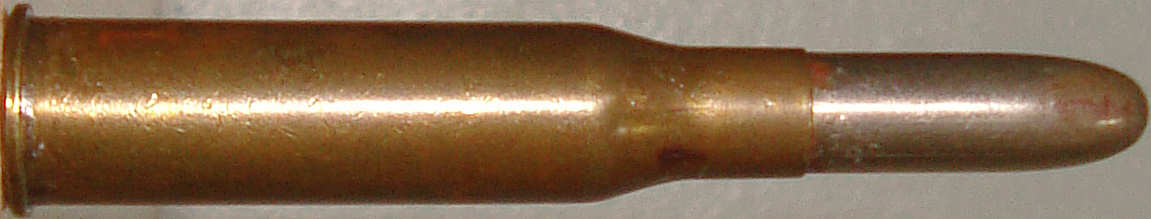
- Type: Rifle cartridge
- Place of origin: Austria-Hungary

Service history
- In service: 1888-1890s (at least)
- Used by: Austria-Hungary

Production history
- Designed: 1888

Specifications
- Case type: Rimmed, bottleneck
- Bullet diameter: 8.14 mm (0.320 in)
- Neck diameter: 8.93 mm (0.352 in)
- Shoulder diameter: 12.06 mm (0.475 in)
- Base diameter: 12.46 mm (0.491 in)
- Rim diameter: 14.08 mm (0.554 in)
- Rim thickness: 1.46 mm (0.057 in)
- Case length: 52.3 mm (2.06 in)
- Overall length: 76.05 mm (2.994 in)
- Filling: Black powder
- Filling weight: 62 grains (4.0 g)

Ballistic performance
Bullet mass/type	Velocity	Energy
244 gr (16 g) M88 RN	1,750 ft/s (533 m/s)	1,660 ft⋅lbf (2,250 J)
- Test barrel length: 30 inches (76 cm)

The 8×52mmR Mannlicher cartridge was first introduced in 1888 for the Mannlicher M1888 rifle, an updated version of the Mannlicher M1886.

== Description ==
The cartridge was given the designation 8mm M.88 scharfe Patrone (8mm M88 Sharp Cartridge). It was loaded with a 244 gr (15.8 g) round nose bullet and a 62 gr (4.0 g) charge of compressed black powder. This gave the bullet an approximate velocity of 1,750 ft/s (530 m/s) out of the M.88's 30" barrel. Many M.86 rifles were converted to accommodate this new cartridge, creating the M.86/88 and M.86/90.

It was succeeded by the semi-smokeless and later on the fully-smokeless powder 8×50mmR Mannlicher cartridge.

== See also ==
- List of rimmed cartridges
