= 8×50mmR Mannlicher =

Austro-Hungarian service rifle cartridge

- Type: Rifle cartridge
- Place of origin: Austria-Hungary

Service history
- Used by: Austria-Hungary; Kingdom of Bulgaria; Kingdom of Italy
- Wars: World War I World War II

Production history
- Designed: 1890 (M. 90)

Specifications
- Parent case: 8×52mmR Mannlicher
- Case type: Rimmed, bottleneck
- Bullet diameter: 8.22 (C.I.P.)
- Land diameter: 7.95 mm (0.313 in)
- Neck diameter: 9.03 mm (0.356 in)
- Shoulder diameter: 12.01 mm (0.473 in)
- Base diameter: 12.48 mm (0.491 in)
- Rim diameter: 14.11 mm (0.556 in)
- Rim thickness: 1.38 mm (0.054 in)
- Case length: 50.38 mm (1.983 in)
- Overall length: 76.21 mm (3.000 in)

Ballistic performance
Bullet mass/type	Velocity	Energy
244 gr (16 g) M90 RN	1,950 ft/s (594 m/s)	2,060 ft⋅lbf (2,793 J)
244 gr (16 g) M93 RN	2,035 ft/s (620 m/s)	2,244 ft⋅lbf (3,042 J)
- Test barrel length: 30

The Austro-Hungarian 8×50mmR Mannlicher or 8×50mmR M93 is a service cartridge dating back to the days of semi-smokeless powder. It was later replaced by (and many weapons were rechambered for) the 8×56mmR cartridge. It is also known as the calibers .315 Indian and .315 Ishapore

== History ==
=== M90 ===
In approximately 1890, the Austro-Hungarian Empire converted the older, black powder filled 8×52mmR Mannlicher round into a semi-smokeless cartridge, following upon the heels of France's 8 mm Lebel cartridge, the first smokeless military round. This new round was designated 8mm M.1890 scharfe Patrone or "nitro-Patrone". It was loaded with the same 244 gr bullet but carried a 43 gr charge of "Gewehrpulver" ("rifle powder", Austria-Hungary's name for their version of smokeless powder, which was actually a "semi-smokeless" powder. The new semi-smokeless loading pushed the bullet to a velocity of 1,950 ft/s (590 m/s) in the converted M.88/90 and M.86/90 Mannlicher rifles.

=== M93 ===
Upon perfection of a completely smokeless powder by the Austro-Hungarians in 1893, the loading was again updated and thus re-designated as the "8mm M.1893 scharfe Patrone". It used the same bullet as the two previous loadings with a 43 gr charge of the new Gewehrpulver M.1892. This improved ballistics slightly, which had been about 200 ft/s (61 m/s) less out of the "repetier-carabiner" Mannlicher M1890 carbine, to 2,035 ft/s (620 m/s) out of the M.88/90 and later Mannlicher M1895 Rifles.

== Current use ==
The 8×50mmR Mannlicher cartridge has a long history of sporting use in India, as it was a simple matter to modify the Lee–Enfield action to accommodate the 8×50mmR in place of the .303 inch cartridge, thus providing a solution to the British colonial administration's 1907 ban on civilians possessing rifles chambered in British military calibres while offering a cartridge of similar capabilities. The IOF.315 Sporting Rifle uses this cartridge under the title of .315 (also .315 Indian).

British gunmakers BSA produced sporting versions of the Lee–Enfield military rifle, chambered in "8mm (.315")" from well before World War I until at least the 1930s. The British-founded "Rifle Factory Ishapore" continues to manufacture Lee–Enfield sporting rifles in this chambering.

As of 2024, the cartridge is still being produced by some specialty manufacturers such as Milsurp Munitions of Florida.

== Handloading ==
Reloadable cartridge cases can be produced by reforming and trimming 8×56mmR Mannlicher or 7.62×54mmR Mosin–Nagant Russian brass. Standard .323" 8mm S-bullets are correct for this caliber though best results are obtained from open-base bullets that can expand to fit the .329" bore. RCBS offers both reforming and reloading dies.

When reloading for "wedge-lock" Mannlicher rifles such as the M.88, M.86/88, M.86/90 or M.88/90 chamber pressures should be kept low for safety. Rifles such as the Mannlicher M.95 using a stronger rotating-bolt design can be loaded to higher pressures.

== Weapons in 8x50mmR ==
=== Rifles ===
- Kropatschek torpedo boats Gewehr M1893
- Mannlicher M1888/90
- Mannlicher M1888/95
- Mannlicher M1888/18
- Mannlicher M1890 rifle
- Mannlicher M1890 carbine
- Mannlicher M1895
- Mannlicher M1893 (Rechambered during WW1)
- Mosin Nagant M1891 (More than 700,000 rechamberd during WW1)

=== Machine guns ===
- Schwarzlose M.7
- Schwarzlose M.7/12
- Madsen M1924
- Skoda Machine guns

== See also ==
- List of rimmed cartridges
