= Mannlicher M1886 =

Repeating Rifle Model 1886
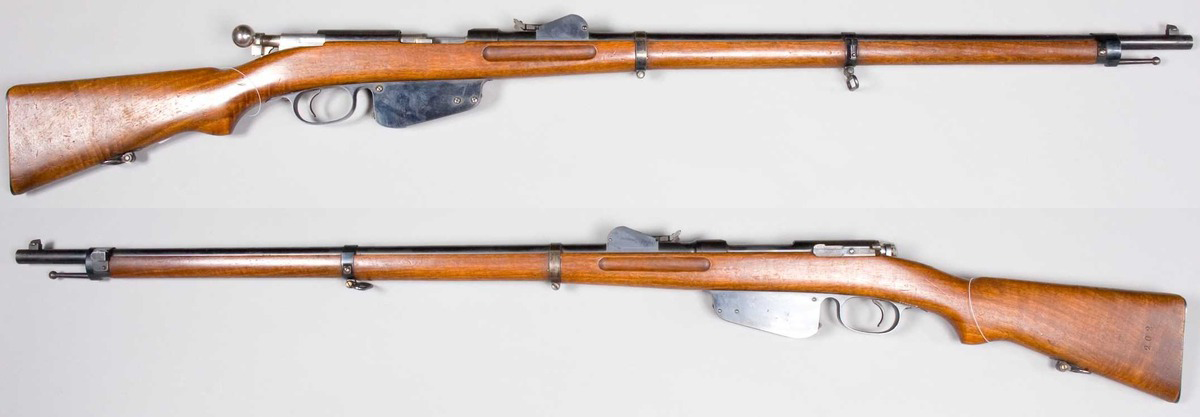
- A sample from the Swedish Army Museum. Note that the magazine extends past the trigger guard, unlike on the Model 1888.
- Type: Bolt-action rifle
- Place of origin: Austria-Hungary

Service history
- In service: 1886–1918
- Used by: See Users

Production history
- Designer: Ferdinand Mannlicher
- Designed: 1886
- Manufacturer: Œ.W.G.
- Produced: 1886–1887
- No. built: 100,000
- Variants: Carbine M1886, M1886-88

Specifications
- Mass: 4.52 kg (10.0 lb)
- Length: 132.6 cm (52.2 in)
- Barrel length: 80.6 cm (31.7 in)
- Cartridge: M86: 11×58mmR; M86-88: 8×52mmR
- Action: Straight-pull bolt action
- Muzzle velocity: 440 m/s (1,444 ft/s) (M1877 ball cartridge)
- Maximum firing range: 2300 paces 1,725 m (1,886 yd)
- Feed system: 5-round en bloc clip, integral box magazine
- Sights: Quadrant sight graduated 300–1500 paces (225–1125 m), long range volley sight adjustable 1600–2300 paces (1200–1725 m)

The Repeating Rifle Model 1886, commonly known as Mannlicher Model 1886, was a late 19th-century Austrian straight-pull bolt-action rifle, adopted in 1886. It used a wedge-lock straight pull action bolt. It was the first straight-pull bolt-action service rifle of any nation.

== History ==
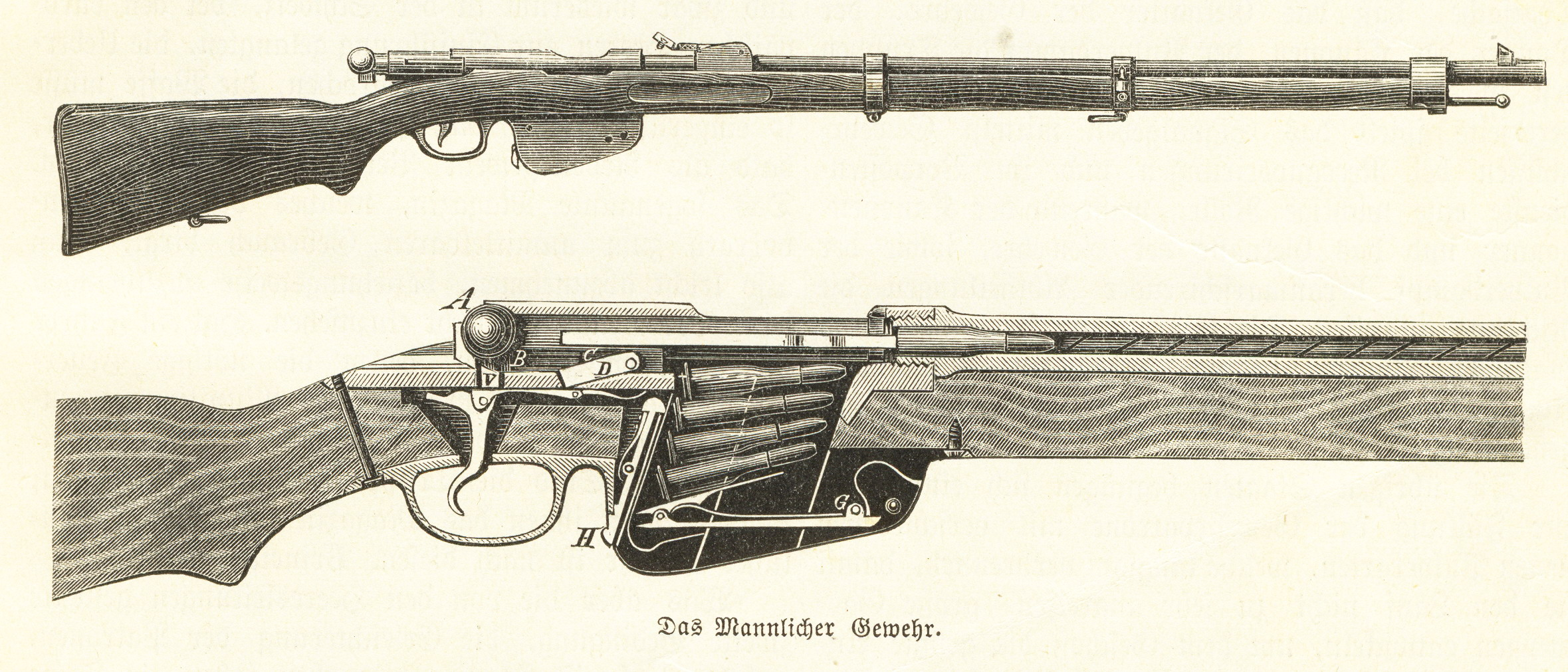
Drawing of Mannlicher M1886 rifle, without the en-bloc clip necessary for proper operation.

The M1886 itself was an improvement of the Mannlicher M1885 trials rifle (patented in the UK in May 1885) that was a prototype meant to replace the by then obsolete M1867 Werndl-Holub drum-breech single-shot rifle. It was the first of the Austro-Hungarian service rifles to introduce the feature of the clip dropping out of the bottom of the magazine when the last round is chambered.

== Conversions ==
Between 1888 and 1892, 95% of the M1886 rifles were converted (rebarreled) to 8×52mmR Mannlicher under the designation M1886-88. Rifles in original (11 mm) caliber with Austrian acceptance marks are a rare find.

== Service history ==
The rifle was quickly made obsolete by the introduction of the Lebel Model 1886 rifle with its new smokeless cartridge. As such it was quickly replaced in Austrian service by its successor the M1888. The rifle still had a long life, however, and turned up in Spain in the hands of republican troops during the Spanish Civil War in the hands of members of the British Battalion at Madrigueras where they were used for training before being replaced on the eve of the Battle of Jarama by more modern rifles such as the Mosin-Nagant.

== Controversies ==
According to an unconfirmed theory Ferdinand Mannlicher could adapt in his rifle some construction details from Orville Robinson's straight-pull magazine rifle with a hinging wedge breechblock. In 1876 Mannlicher visited the Centennial Exposition to study firearms design, and he researched plans and models at the patent office in Philadelphia. He may have been exposed there to Orvill Robinson's project which was patented in the US (but not in Europe) (and produced, until his company was bought and shut down by W.R.A.). However, it is unknown if Mannlicher has even seen any Robinson's project.

== Users ==
- Austria-Hungary
- Chile
- Colombia:Acquired from Venezuela by liberal forces during the Thousand Days War
- Republic of China
- China
- Honduras: Surplus rifles were bought from German dealers, they were still in use in the 1930s
- Persia: 5,000 purchased between 1889 and 1890.
- Spain
- Venezuela

== Conflicts ==
- Thousand Days War
- Boxer Rebellion
- World War I
- Spanish Civil War

== See also ==
- Mannlicher M1888
- Mannlicher M1890 carbine
- Mannlicher M1895
