= 11×58mmR =

Rifle cartridge

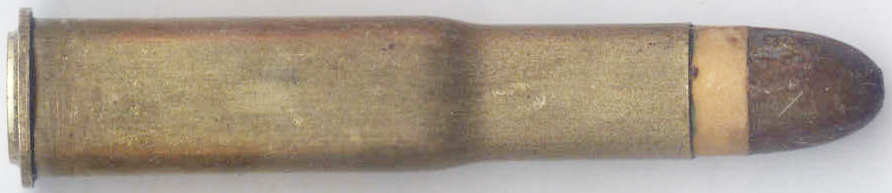
- Type: Rifle
- Place of origin: Austria-Hungary

Service history
- In service: 1877–1918
- Used by: Austria-Hungary
- Wars: World War I (limited use)

Production history
- Designed: 1877

Specifications
- Parent case: 11.15×42mmR
- Case type: Rimmed, bottleneck
- Bullet diameter: 11.2 mm (0.44 in)
- Neck diameter: 11.84 mm (0.466 in)
- Shoulder diameter: 13.61 mm (0.536 in)
- Base diameter: 13.84 mm (0.545 in)
- Rim diameter: 15.67 mm (0.617 in)
- Case length: 57.66 mm (2.270 in)
- Overall length: 76.71 mm (3.020 in)

The 11×58mmR M1877, 11mm Werndl or 11.15×58mmR is a black powder cartridge used in the M1867 Werndl–Holub rifle as well as the Mannlicher M1886 rifle.

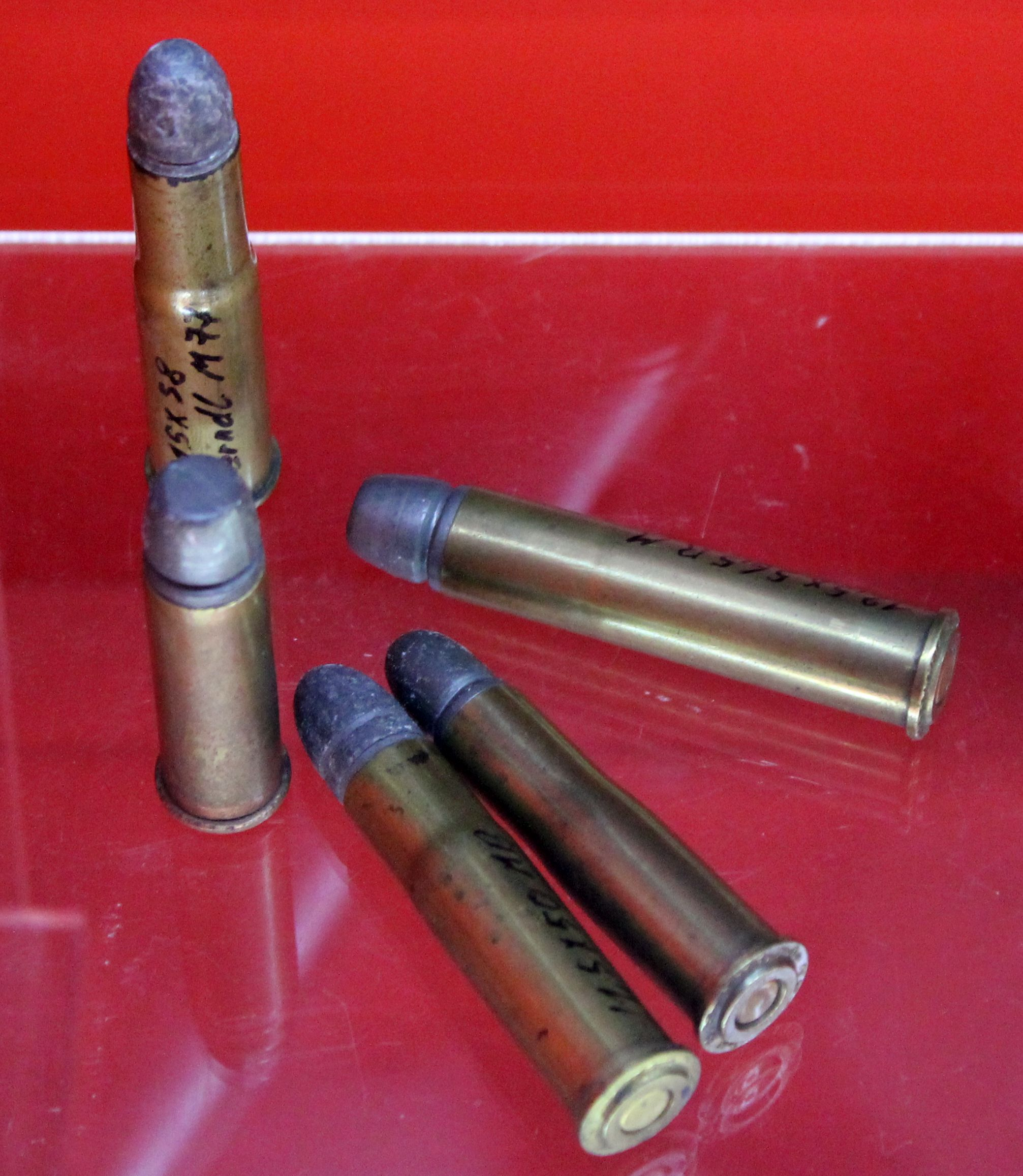
11x58mmR Werndl (upper left) with other contemporary European black powder cartridges

== See also ==
- List of rimmed cartridges
- Table of handgun and rifle cartridges
