= Zoran Vujović (Serbian politician) =

Serbian politician (born 1954)

Zoran Vujović (Serbian Cyrillic: Зоран Вујовић; born 17 December 1954) is a Serbian former politician. He was the mayor of Užice from 1989 to 1995, a member of the Serbian parliament from 1994 to 1997, and a cabinet minister of the Federal Republic of Yugoslavia for most of the period from 1994 to 2000. During his political career, Vujović was a member of the Socialist Party of Serbia (SPS).

== Early life and career ==
Vujović was born in Užice (known at the time as Titovo Užice), in what was then the People's Republic of Serbia in the Federal People's Republic of Yugoslavia. He holds a masters' degree (1984) and a PhD (1988) from the University of Belgrade Faculty of Technology and Metallurgy. Vujović worked at the Užice technical college before entering political life and was at one time involved in special-purpose (i.e., military) production work at Prvi Partizan.

== Politician ==
=== Mayor ===
Vujović first became mayor of Užice after the 1989 Serbian local elections. (Note: The book Institutions Abused identifies Vujović as having been a delegate in the Serbian parliament's Chamber of Associated Labour from 1989 to 1990. This information does not appear in other biographical sketches of Vujović. It is possible that this source confuses him with a different Zoran Vujović, a member of Serbia's labour movement who at one time lived in Užice.) In January 1990, he met with representatives of Serbian Orthodox Church to commemorate Christmas, the first time since World War II that the holiday was officially marked by the city authorities. The following month, he described Užice's industry as being in a semi-colonial state relative to its partners in Slovenia.

Multiparty democracy was formally reintroduced to Serbia in 1990, although in practice the Socialist Party dominated Serbian politics for the next decade under the authoritarian leadership of Slobodan Milošević. Vujović ran as the Socialist candidate for Titovo Užice's second division in the 1990 Serbian parliamentary election. He was defeated in the second round when the opposition united around his opponent, Ivan Milutinović of the Serbian Renewal Movement (SPO). This was the last Serbian parliamentary election in which members were elected for individual constituencies; all subsequent elections have been held under proportional representation.

In July 1991, Serbia's government removed Tito's name from cities and municipalities across the republic, including Užice. Vujović's local administration subsequently moved a monument of Tito from its prominent place in Partizan Square to a more discreet location.

The Socialists won a landslide majority in Užice in the May 1992 Serbian local elections, due in part to a boycott by most opposition parties. Given ongoing doubts about the legitimacy of these elections, another local election cycle took place in December 1992, this time with the opposition's participation. The Socialists won another majority in Užice, albeit by a reduced margin. On both occasions, Vujović was confirmed for a new term as mayor when the municipal assembly convened.

Vujović affirmed his membership in the Socialist Party in a March 1992 interview while remarking that it was then "fashionable" to be part of the political opposition. He added that his party affiliation had no practical bearing on his work as mayor. In November of the same year, the newspaper Borba described him as "an unusual mayor in many ways," observing that he avoided "empty political talk" and often cooperated with members of opposition parties.

He resigned as mayor in January 1995, shortly after being appointed to a federal cabinet position. In leaving office, he took credit for reducing Užice's formerly acrimonious political divisions and for ensuring the city would be governed by its own residents, rather than by special advisors from Belgrade.

=== Parliamentarian ===
Vujović appeared in the lead position on the Socialist Party's electoral list for the Užice division in the 1993 Serbian parliamentary election. During the campaign, he said that the Socialists were seeking to win an outright majority and provide a stable government for the next four years, and to end the international sanctions that had been imposed in the context of the Yugoslav Wars of the 1990s. He was elected when the Socialists won eleven out of twenty-four seats in the division, and he took his seat when the assembly met in January 1994. (From 1992 to 2000, Serbia's electoral law stipulated that one-third of parliamentary mandates would be assigned to candidates from successful lists in numerical order, while the remaining two-thirds would be distributed amongst other candidates on the same lists at the discretion of the sponsoring parties. As his party's list leader, Vujović was automatically elected.) Overall, the Socialists fell just short of a majority government with 123 out of 250 seats and afterward formed an administration with support from the small New Democracy (ND) party. In the assembly, Vujović was a member of the committee for science and technological development. He served for one term and did not seek re-election in 1997.

=== Cabinet minister and party representative ===
Vujović was appointed as minister of transport and communications in the federal Yugoslavian government in September 1994. He spoke in favour of increased European integration in January 1995, calling for legal reforms to "eliminate all unnecessary restrictions on the entry of foreign capital into the country."

As transport and communications minister, Vujović was frequently involved in negotiations with Serbia's neighbours. In May 1995, he signed a protocol with Ukrainian transport minister Aleksandar Nikolayevich Artemenko for cooperation on transport issues. Later in the same month, he held discussions with his Romanian counterpart Aurel Novak on rail transportation, navigation of the Danube, and other matters. In December 1995, Vujović and Bulgarian minister Ljubomir Kolarov called for their countries to form a Balkan telecommunications pool to assist with the process of European integration.

Following the conclusion of the Croatian and Bosnian wars, Vujović was involved in normalizing transit relations with these countries. In March 1996, he took part in a one-day visit to Zagreb intended to normalize road and rail traffic between the FR Yugoslavia and Croatia. The following month, he held follow-up discussions in Belgrade with Croatian officials. In August, he announced that flights would soon begin from Belgrade to Sarajevo.

Vujović was dropped from cabinet in March 1997; his successor as transport minister was Montenegrin politician Dejan Drobnjaković. While he did not hold an official government position from 1997 to 1999, he remained visible in Serbian politics as a member of the Socialist Party's executive board and as the leader of the party's organization in the Zlatibor District.

In July 1998, during the early period of the Kosovo War, he said that the Socialist Party "believes that the majority of Albanians in Kosovo do not support terrorism and expects them to condemn and oppose it [...] as well as to do everything to force [their political leaders] to sit down at the negotiating table and continue the dialogue without preconditions." The following year, he spoke at rallies against the NATO bombing of Yugoslavia.

Vujović returned to the Yugoslavian government as a minister without portfolio in August 1999. In November of that year, he said that the first stage of reconstruction after the NATO bombing was complete. He offered vocal support to Slobodan Milošević's leadership during this time and criticized opposition politicians for meeting with those he described as "the executioners of the Serbian people" (referring to western politicians who had supported the NATO bombing campaign).

During his tenure as a minister without portfolio, Vujović was head of federal housing commission and president of the federal commission for relations with religious communities.

=== 2000 elections ===
Slobodan Milošević was defeated by Vojislav Koštunica in the 2000 Yugoslavian presidential election and subsequently fell from power on 5 October 2000. In the parliamentary election that took place concurrently with the presidential vote, Vujović appeared in the second position on a combined electoral list of the Socialist Party and the Yugoslav Left (JUL) for the Užice division. Although the list won two seats, he did not take a mandate. (For this election, half of the assembly mandates were assigned in numerical order and the other half at the discretion of the sponsoring parties or coalitions. Vujović was not automatically elected by virtue of his list position.)

Vujović was accused of distributing dozens of apartments and loans to members of the outgoing Milošević regime in his capacity as housing commission chair, just before he stood down as a minister without portfolio.

== After politics ==
Vujović later taught at Singidunum University and was the owner of the company "TMF 2005," which worked in the fields of engineering, transport, and mediation and represented Israeli companies. In December 2012, he was elected to the programming board of Radio Television of Serbia.

== Electoral record ==
=== National Assembly of Serbia ===
1990 Serbian parliamentary election: Titovo Užice II
Candidate	Party	First round		Second round	
Candidate	Party	Votes	%	Votes	%
Ivan Milutinović	Serbian Renewal Movement		30.84		elected
Zoran Vujović	Socialist Party of Serbia		43.43		defeated
Dobrivoje Antonijević	New Democracy – Movement for Serbia		defeated		
Mira Jovanović	Party of Independent Entrepreneurs and Peasants		defeated		
Nada Novaković	Democratic Party		defeated		
Total					
Source: Antonijević, Jovanović, and Novaković are listed alphabetically.
