= Mannlicher M1895 =

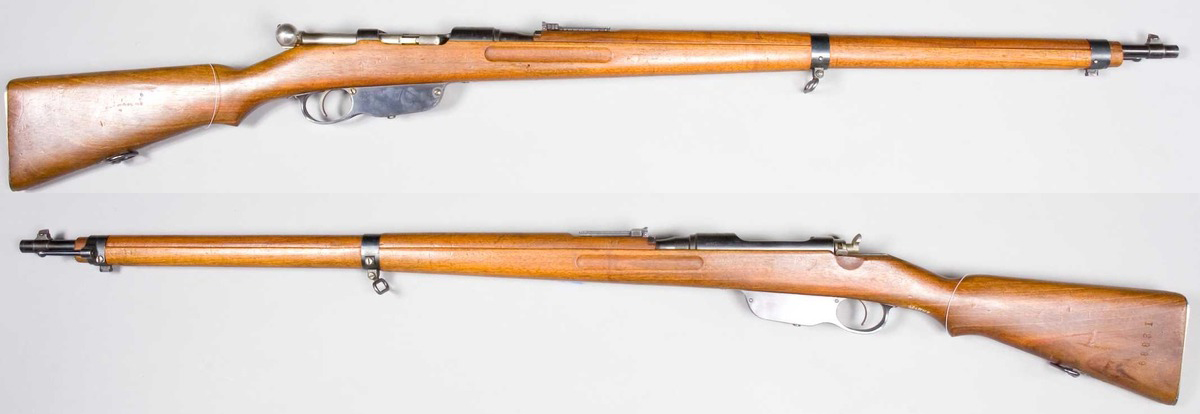
- Mannlicher M1895 Rifle. From the collections of the Swedish Army Museum.
- Type: Straight pull bolt-action rifle
- Place of origin: Austria-Hungary

Service history
- In service: 1895–1918 (Austria-Hungary); 1895–present (Other nations, ceremonial)
- Used by: See Users
- Wars: First Sino-Japanese War; Boxer Rebellion; Ilinden–Preobrazhenie Uprising; First Balkan War; Second Balkan War; World War I Russian Civil War; Austro-Slovene conflict in Carinthia; Revolutions and interventions in Hungary; Polish-Soviet War; Austrian Civil War; Second Italo-Ethiopian War; Spanish Civil War; Sudeten German uprising World War II; Greek Civil War; 1948 Arab–Israeli War; 1958 Lebanon crisis Lebanese Civil War; Rhodesian Bush War

Production history
- Designer: Ferdinand Mannlicher
- Designed: 1895
- Manufacturer: 1896–1918: Œ.W.G. in Steyr; 1897–1926: F.G.GY. in Budapest; 1918–1920: Zbrojovka Brno
- Produced: 1896–1920s
- No. built: approx. 3,500,000
- Variants: See Variants

Specifications (M95 Long Rifle)
- Mass: Rifle: 3.78 kg (8.3 lb); Carbine: 3.4 kg (7.5 lb)
- Length: Rifle: 1,272 mm (50.1 in); Carbine: 1,003 mm (39.5 in)
- Barrel length: Rifle: 765 mm (30.1 in); Carbine: 500 mm (19.7 in)
- Cartridge: M95: 8×50mmR Mannlicher; M95/30 & 31.M: 8×56mmR; M95/24 & M95M: 7.92×57mm Mauser
- Action: Straight-pull bolt action
- Rate of fire: approx. 20–25 rounds/min
- Muzzle velocity: M93 (8×50mmR): 620 m/s (2,000 ft/s); M30 (8×56mmR): 720 m/s (2,400 ft/s)
- Feed system: 5-round internal box magazine, loaded with 5-round en bloc clips or (stripper clips in M95/24 and M95M variants)
- Sights: Rear V-notch flip-up sight and front post (telescopic sight on sniper variant)

The Mannlicher M1895 (German: Infanterie Repetier-Gewehr M.95, Hungarian: Gyalogsági Ismétlő Puska M95; "Infantry Repeating-Rifle M95") is an Austro-Hungarian straight pull bolt-action rifle, designed by Ferdinand Ritter von Mannlicher that used a refined version of his revolutionary straight-pull action bolt, much like the Mannlicher M1890 carbine. It was nicknamed the Ruck-Zuck-[Gewehr] by Austrian troops (ruck-zuck is spoken as "roock-tsoock", in common language meaning "back and forth [rifle]") and "Ta-Pum" by Italian troops, who wrote a song ^{(it)} about it during World War I. The primary producers were the ŒWG in Steyr and FÉG in Budapest.

Originally they were chambered for the round nosed 8×50mmR cartridge, but almost all of the rifles were rechambered to accept the more powerful and longer-range spitzer 8×56mmR cartridge in the 1930s.

== Method of Operation ==
The M1895 is unusual in employing a straight-pull bolt action, as opposed to the more common rotating bolt handle of other rifles. It combines a two lug rotating bolt head, similar in construction to that found on a Mauser rifle with a pair of helical grooves cut in the bolt body to turn the back-and-forth movement of the bolt handle and body into the rotational movement of the bolt head. The extractor performs both the usual function and also has a tail attached, which interfaces with slots on the cam surfaces of the bolt head to prevent the bolt head from rotating as a result of the striker's spring pressure once it has been unlocked.

The angle of the cam surfaces in the bolt and bolt body is different from the angle at which the locking recesses are cut in the receiver of the rifle; the result is that the first 20 mm (0.79 in) of travel of the bolt body results in the rotation of the bolt head, but with only about 3 mm (0.12 in) of rearward movement, this gives a mechanical advantage to the system and accomplishes primary extraction of the spent casing from the chamber.

The result of this is that the user can pull the bolt back and forth in two movements rather than the up-back-forward-down of conventional turn bolt rifles. It is consequently renowned for combining a relatively high rate of fire (around 20–25 rounds per minute) with reliability and sturdiness, although this requires decent care and maintenance. During Austro-Hungarian trials in 1892, rifles survived torture testing of firing 50,000 rounds without any form of lubrication.

The rifle is loaded by means of a five-round en-bloc clip, which, when loaded with cartridges, is pressed into the magazine of the rifle, where it is retained and acts as the feed lips of the magazine. When the last of the five rounds has been chambered, there is no longer anything retaining the clip in the magazine, and it falls out a port in the bottom due to gravity. There is a button in the front of the trigger guard which allows the user to eject a partially or fully loaded en-bloc clip from the magazine when the bolt is open to unload the weapon. The clip will be ejected from the weapon quite energetically as the full force of the follower spring will be pressing against it.

The rifle is not designed to be loaded by any other means but with an en-bloc clip. Attempts to individual feed cartridges into the rifle in absence of proper en-bloc clips may cause damage to the extractor as it is not designed with enough travel to overcome the large rims of the 8x50mmR and 8x56mmR cartridges used in the M1895 unless they are fed under the extractor from the en-bloc clip.

Yugoslav rifles modified in the mid-1920s had their barrels replaced with 8mm Mauser barrels, as well as being given new handguards and sights to match those of the Mauser 1924. A stripper clip guide was milled into the receiver, and a modified en bloc clip was permanently affixed inside the magazine well to serve as feed lips. The extractor was also modified for use with rimless ammunition, though they are generally more fragile and prone to breaking when loading single rounds into the chamber (the M1895 utilizes a controlled feed).

== History ==
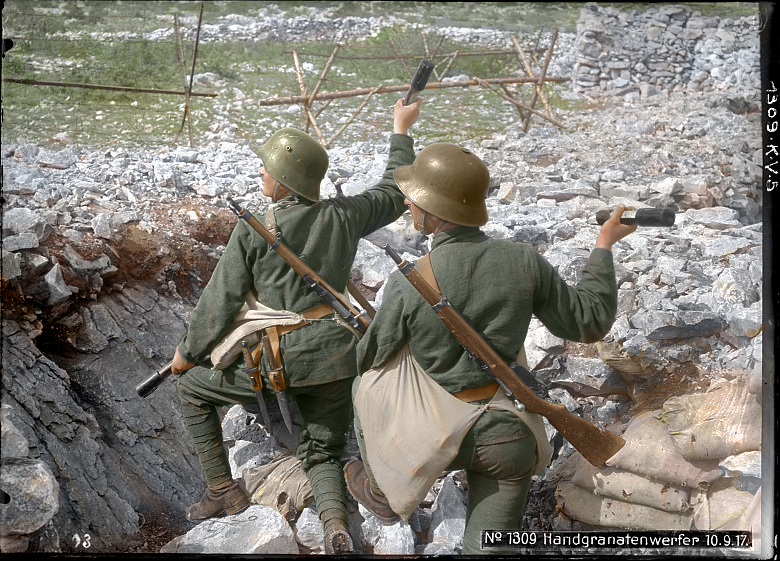
Austro-Hungarian Stormtroopers armed with Mannlicher M95 Stutzens at the Isonzo front in 1917 (colorized).

The M1895 was initially adopted and employed by the Austro-Hungarian Army throughout World War I and retained post-war by both the Austrian and Hungarian armies. The main foreign user was German Empire Marine-Detachment Skutari (a ~100-man company drawn from the I. and II. Seebataillon, stationed in Shkodër, Albania as part of an international peacekeeping force from 1913 to 1914) was primarily armed with the Gew98, but also carried Mannlicher rifles alongside Austro-Hungarian ammunition pouches, and Bulgaria, which, starting in 1903, acquired large numbers and continued using them throughout both Balkan and World Wars. After Austria-Hungary's defeat in World War I, many were given to other Balkan states as war reparations. A number of these rifles also saw use in World War II, particularly by second line, reservist, and partisan units in Romania, Yugoslavia, Italy, and to a lesser degree, Germany. Post-war many were sold as cheap surplus, with some finding their way to the hands of African guerrillas in the 1970s and many more being exported to the United States as sporting and collectible firearms. The M1895 bolt also served as an almost exact template for the ill-fated Canadian M1905 Ross rifle, though the later M1910 used a complicated interrupted-thread instead of two solid lugs.

== Ammunition ==
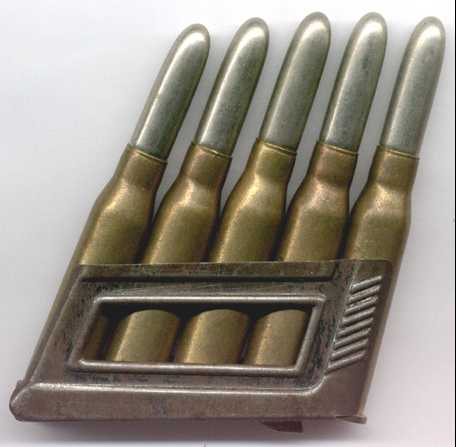
Round nosed 8×50mmR cartridges

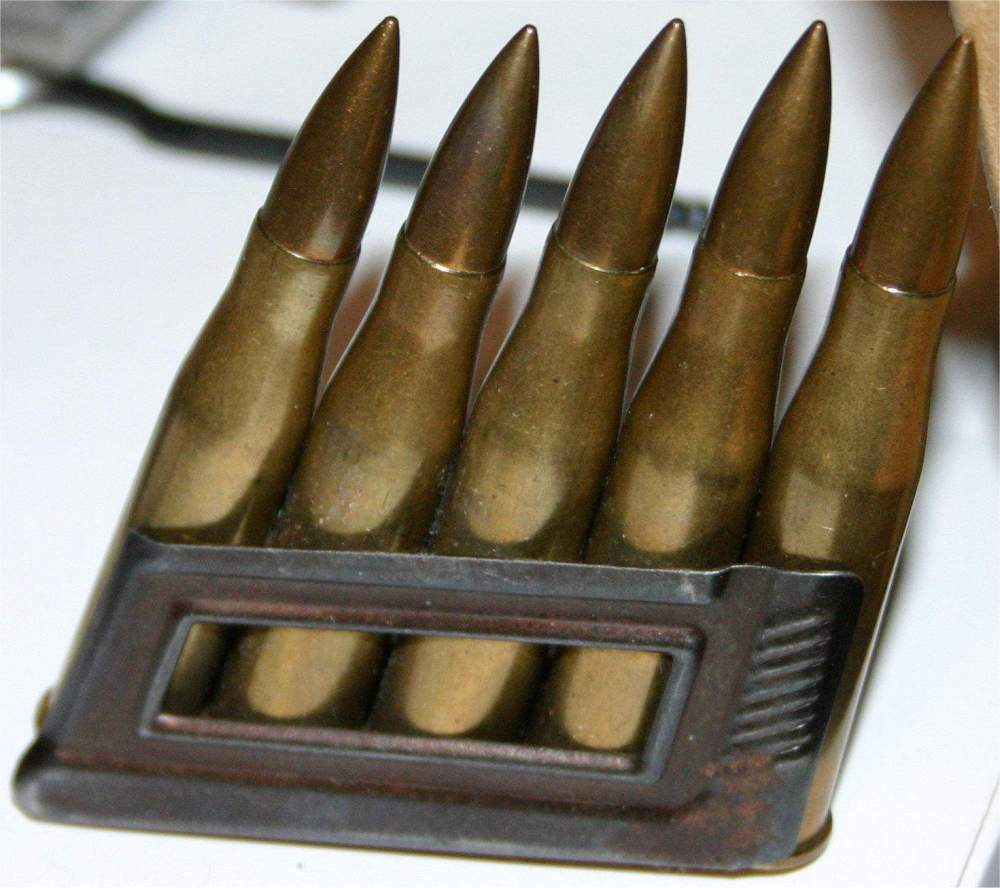
Spitzer bullet 8×56mmR cartridges

Five cartridges in an en-bloc clip

The M1895 was originally chambered in the 8mm M.1893 Scharfe Patrone (8×50mmR Mannlicher) cartridge. Between the world wars, both Austria and Hungary converted the majority of their rifles to fire the more powerful 8×56mmR round.
Yugoslavia converted at least some of their captured M1895s to 7.92×57mm Mauser, fed by stripper clips instead of the original model's en bloc clip system. This conversion was designated M95/24 and M95M. The M95/24 is often mistakenly attributed to Bulgaria, but 8×57mm IS was never a standard cartridge of the Bulgarian military. These conversions are prized by collectors for their relative scarcity and chambering in a commonly available round, but suffer from a fragile extractor, missing internal clip, and lack of replacement parts.

== Variants ==
For the post World War I conversions see Conversions.

=== Rifle ===
The "Infantry Repeating-Rifle M1895" (German: Infanterie Repetier-Gewehr M1895) was the basic variant. It was chambered for the 8×50mmR Mannlicher cartridge. Its iron sights were graduated 300–2600 paces (225–1950 m). It was used during World War I by the majority of the Austro-Hungarian Army troops.

=== Stutzen ===
This stutzen, or short rifle (official designation German: Repetier-Stutzen M1895; "Repeating-Stutzen M1895") was mainly used by special troops (i.e. storm troops) during World War I. It chambered the 8×50mmR Mannlicher cartridge. Its sights were graduated 500–2400 paces (375–1800 m).

Weight: 3.09 kilograms (6.8 lb)
Length: 1,003 millimetres (39.5 in)
Barrel length: 500 millimetres (20 in)

=== Carbine ===
The carbine (official designation German: Kavalerie Repetier-Carabiner M1895; "Cavalry Repeating-Carbine M1895") was chambered 8×50mmR Mannlicher and used by cavalry units of the Austro-Hungarian Army as a replacement of the Mannlicher M1890 carbine. The sights were graduated 500–2400 paces (375–1800 m). Although it originally didn't have bayonet lugs, during World War I it was fitted with a stutzen-like front barrel band with bayonet lugs after mounted cavalry units were found ineffective.

Weight: 3.4 kilograms (7.5 lb)
Length: 990 millimetres (39 in)
Barrel length: 480 millimetres (19 in)

=== Sniper rifle ===
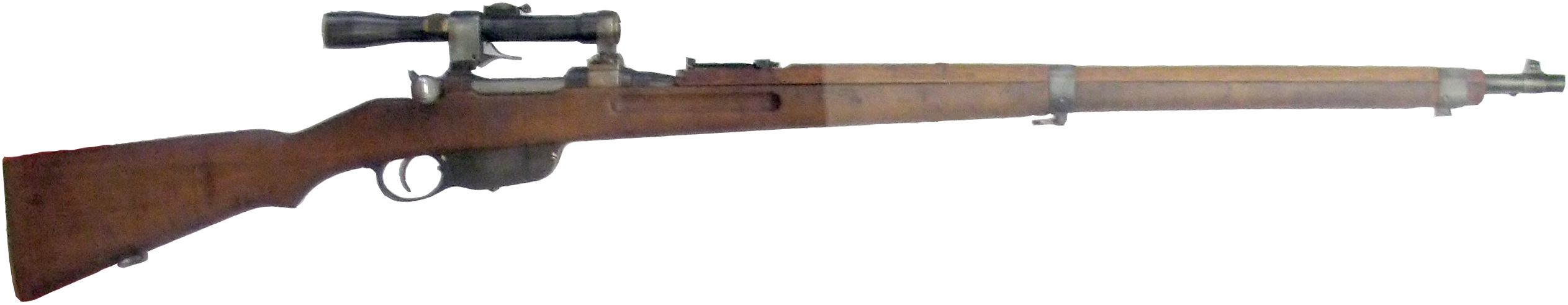
Sniper rifle variant.

The main difference from the standard rifle and sniper was the telescopic sight mount. The scope was mounted slightly to the left so the rifle could be fed by the en-bloc clip. Approximately 6,000 long and short barreled sniper rifles were made in the years 1915–1918.

=== Conversions ===
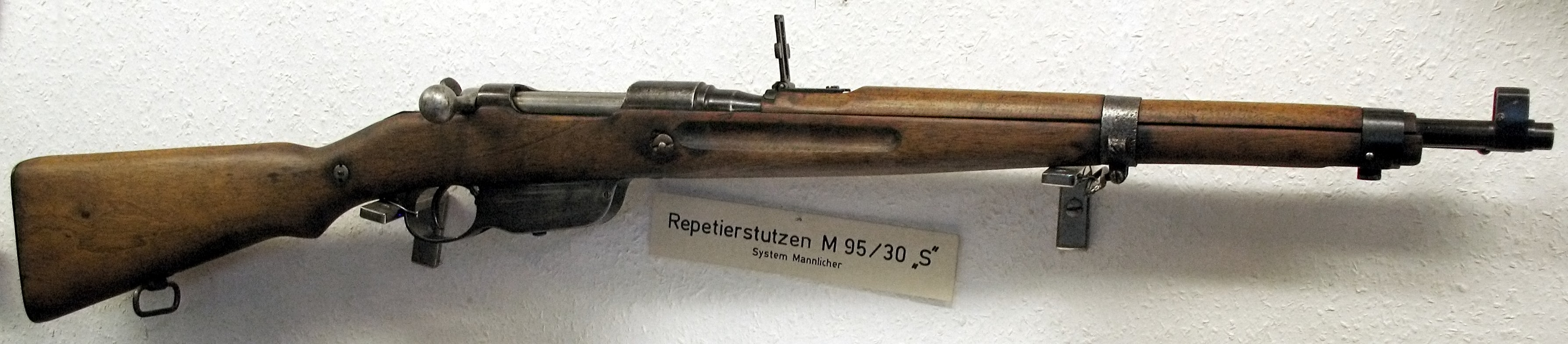
The Mannlicher M95/30 conversion.

The M95/30 was a conversion in the First Austrian Republic by Steyr-Mannlicher during 1930–1940. These rifles carry the letter "S," meaning Spitzer stamped on the barrel. The main modification was the rechambering to 8×56mmR cartridge. Other changes were the conversion of ladder sights from the older pace unit to meters and the addition of a brass front sight protector. Many long rifles were cut down to Stutzen length. Most of the M95/30s were sent to Bulgaria during 1938–40, where front sight protectors were removed.

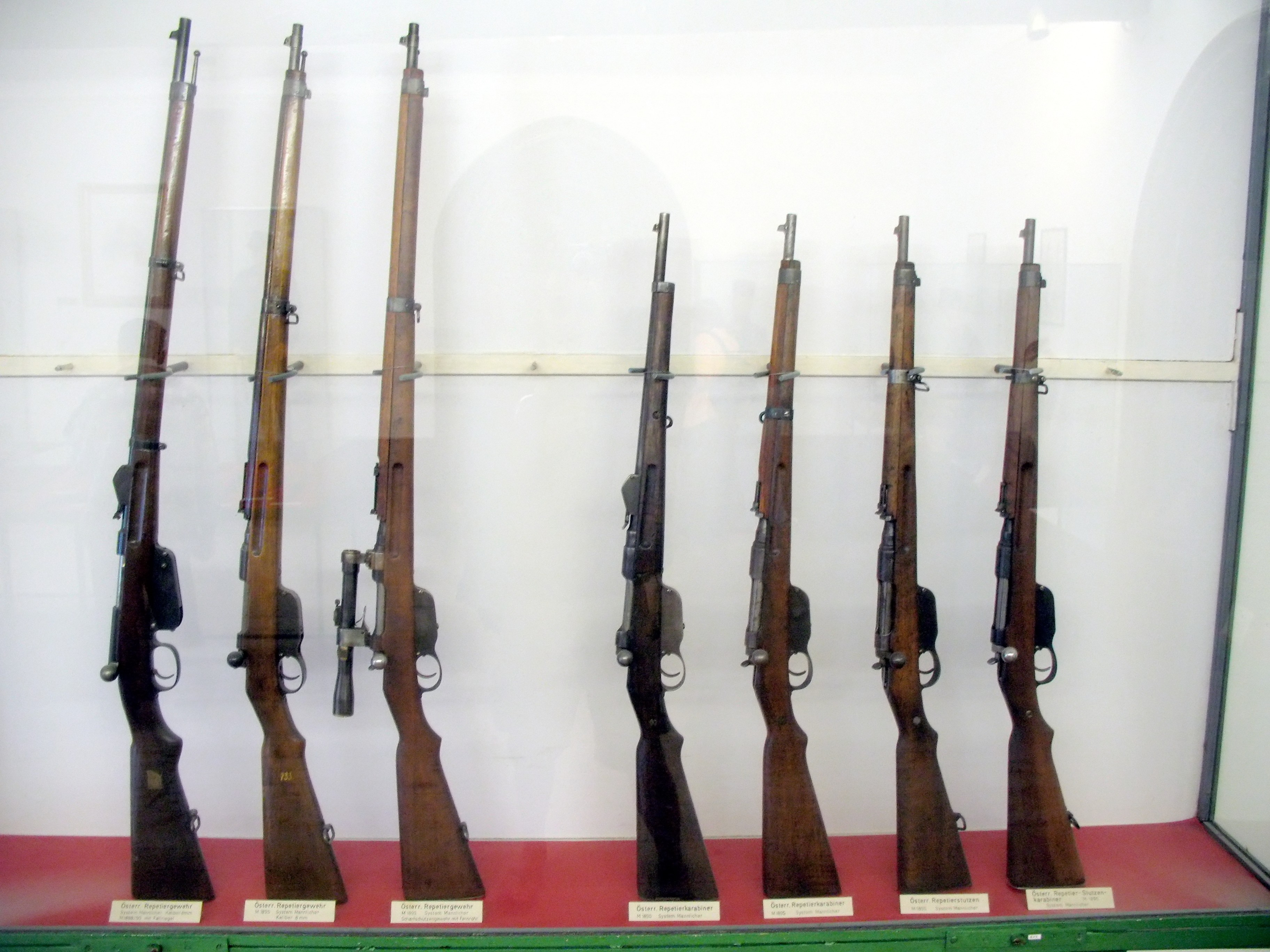
Various Mannlicher rifles and carbines. The long rifle on far left is an 1888 model and the carbine on the far left is an 1890 model. The rest are various 1895 models.

The 31.M or M95/31 was a conversion done in the Kingdom of Hungary. Rifles were converted 1931–1935 by FÉG in Budapest and carry the letter H meaning Hegyes Töltény (pointed bullet) stamped on top of the chamber. The conversion included rechambering to the new 8×56mmR pointed bullet cartridge, new metric ladder sights, and the addition of a front-sight protector. Long rifles were cut down to carbine length and designated 31/a.M. A small number were rechambered but were not cut down for the Hungarian Governmental Guards; these had special long bayonets.

The M95M or M95/24 was a conversion to the 7.92×57mm cartridge by the Kragujevac Arsenal in the Kingdom of Yugoslavia. These rifles feature Yugoslavian M24 Mauser barrels, sights, and similar handguards and are fed by five-round stripper clips. Their extractors are prone to breakage when being fired single-shot. Some of these rifles were found in the Kingdom of Greece by the German forces during World War II and were mistakenly attributed Greek origin.

==== Hungarian use and modifications during World War 2 ====
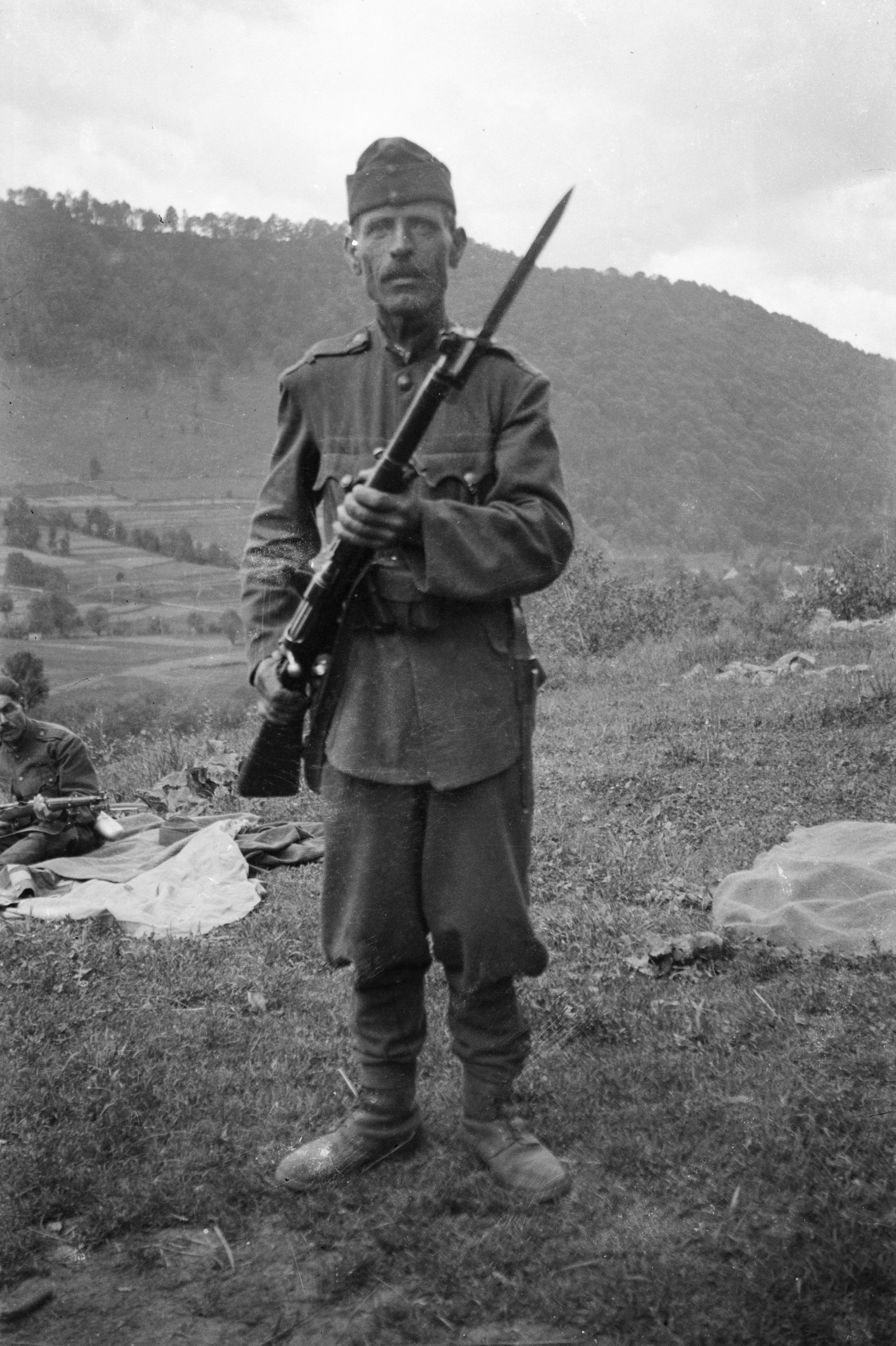
Hungarian reservist with a Mannlicher rifle, 1940.

After 1938, Hungarian soldiers in rifle companies were reequipped with the new 35M rifle, but most of the troopers (machine gunners, supply troops, pioneers, gunners, messengers, etc.) were still equipped with Mannlichers. In mid-1940 the Royal Hungarian Defense Forces ('Magyar Királyi Honvédség', the name of the army at the time) had 565 thousand rifles. Of this, 105 thousand were new 35M, 100 thousand “1895 Mauser“ rifles (likely an inventory name for unconverted M95s and Mausers bought for training) and the rest were Mannlicher, by variants:

- 11 thousand 88/90
- 349 thousand 31.M (old rifles converted to 8x56 standard and post-war FÉG production; this number does not include rifles used by gendarmes)
  - Carbine-length rifles were designated as 31.a.M, and these were regularized in the machine gun companies, artillery batteries, recon, and signal units.

During 1941, 30 thousand of 95 million rifles were converted to the 31.AM standard (note: the name changed to AM from a.m.). After 1941 only 35M were produced, so the number of Mannlichers decreased continuously. In addition to the losses, the significant wear and tear of the already quite old weapons also played a big role in this. Mannlichers remained the almost exclusive type of rifle in some formations; e.g.,, pioneer and artillery units used 31.Ms. until the end of the war. This led to numerous issues during the battles of 1945, as weapon jams were highly prevalent. Most of these problems arose from the rapid and repeated firing, which caused already worn-out weapons to jam due to thermal expansion. If a soldier attempted to forcefully open the lock, it could potentially crack. After 1945, a few pieces were still used by the re-established military, border guard, and police units, but they quickly wore out. Moreover, the majority of rifles belonging to civilians (hunters, guards) were confiscated by the communists. So, interestingly, more 31M rifles remained intact in the surrounding countries than in Hungary. Around 450,000 31.M rifles were converted in total.

=== Summary ===
	Cartridge	Length	Weight	Sling Swivels	Bayonet Lug	Notes
Rifle Model 1895	8×50mmR	128.2 cm (50.5 in)	3.63 kg (8.0 lb)	Under	Yes	
Carbine Model 1895	8×50mmR	100 cm (39 in)	2.95 kg (6.5 lb)	Side	No	7 in (18 cm) gap between front and rear barrel bands
Stutzen Model 1895	8×50mmR	100 cm (39 in)	3.13 kg (6.9 lb)	Under	Yes	5 in (13 cm) gap between front and rear barrel bands
Carbine Model 1895 with Stutzen lug	8×50mmR	100 cm (39 in)	3.18 kg (7.0 lb)	Side	Yes	7 in (18 cm) gap between front and rear barrel bands
Carbine-Stutzen Model 1895	8×50mmR	100 cm (39 in)	3.22 kg (7.1 lb)	Either	Yes	5 in (13 cm) gap between front and rear barrel bands
Stutzen-Carbine Model 1895	8×50mmR	100 cm (39 in)	3.27 kg (7.2 lb)	Both	Yes	7 in (18 cm) gap between front and rear barrel bands
Rifle Model 1895/30	8×56mmR	128.2 cm (50.5 in)	3.63 kg (8.0 lb)	Under	Yes	
Stutzen Model 1895/30	8×56mmR	100 cm (39 in)	3.22 kg (7.1 lb)	Either	Yes	
Stutzen Model 1895/30 from Long Rifle	8×56mmR	100 cm (39 in)	3.22 kg (7.1 lb)	Either	Yes	Long rifle rear sight
Rifle M95M and M95/24	7.92×57mm	110 cm (43 in)	3.86 kg (8.5 lb)	Both	Yes	

== Accessories ==
=== Bayonet ===
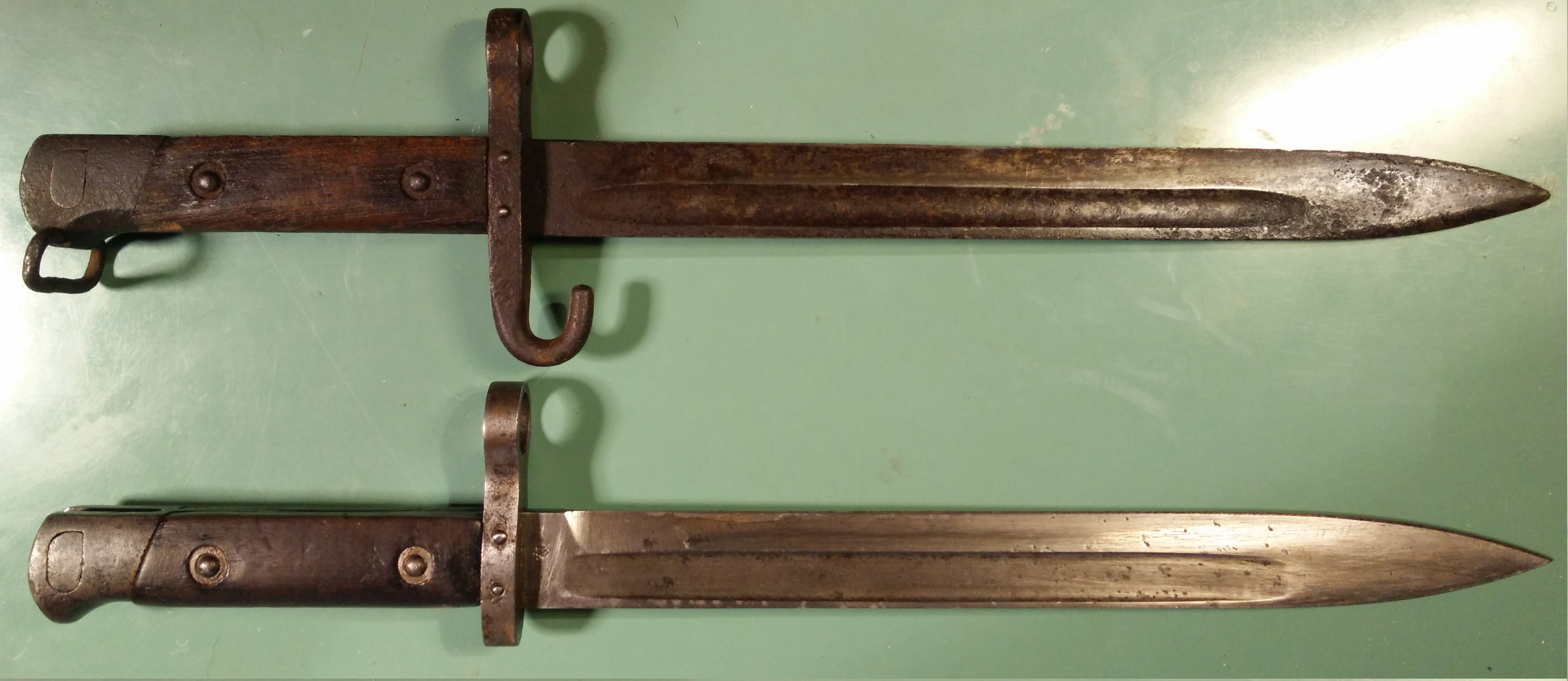
NCO bayonet (top) and enlisted men bayonet (bottom).

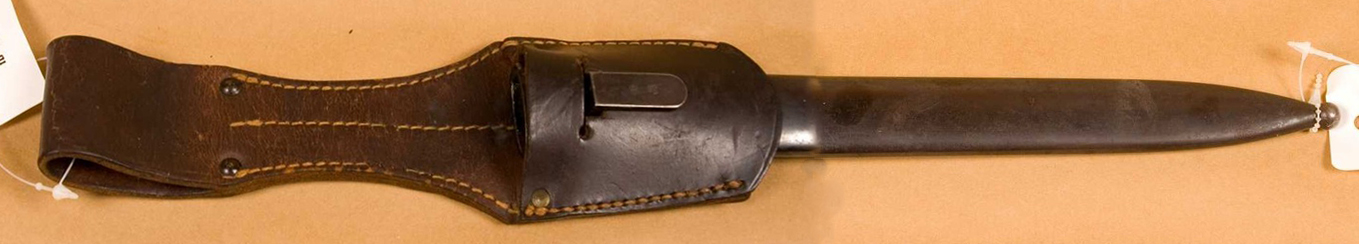
Scabbard and frog.

There were two main variants of the bayonet; the first was the standard bayonet, the second was the NCO variant that featured a hooked quillion and a golden lanyard. The overall length was 360 millimetres (14 in) and the blade was 248 millimetres (9.8 in) long. The bayonet was unusual in that the edge faced upwards when mounted on the rifle. The majority of them were made by Œ.W.G. and F.G.GY. Bayonets were originally not serial numbered.

Late in World War I resources were limited and they started manufacturing replacement (German: Ersatz) bayonets. These were fast to produce, cheap and made completely out of metal.

=== Night sights ===
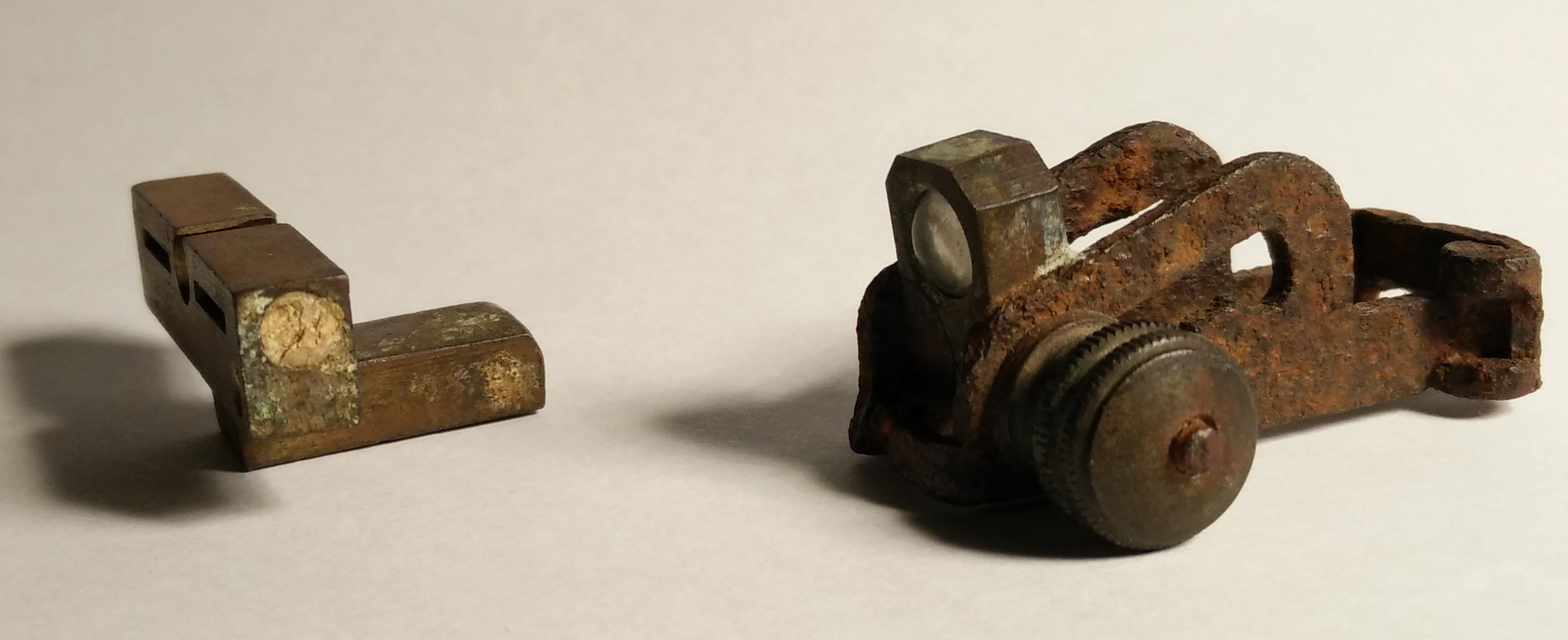
A set of rear and front Luminous Sights M.1916.

A number of Model 1916 night (Luminous) sights were issued during World War I. The rear night sight is a small brass plate that is placed underneath the rear sight leaf. The front sight clamps around the rifle's front sight base.

=== Wire destroyer ===
A Drahtzerstörer or "wire destroyer" device for Mannlicher type firearms was also sometimes issued with the rifle during World War I. During assaults, when soldiers would run into barbed wire obstacles, the "wire destroyer" would grab one of the wires and the soldier would shoot through it. It could only be used with a mounted bayonet.
Various other improvised wire destroyers existed, some originally designed for the Mosin–Nagant rifle that were captured on the Eastern front were easily modified to fit the M95. Some were also crafted by military blacksmiths.

== Users ==
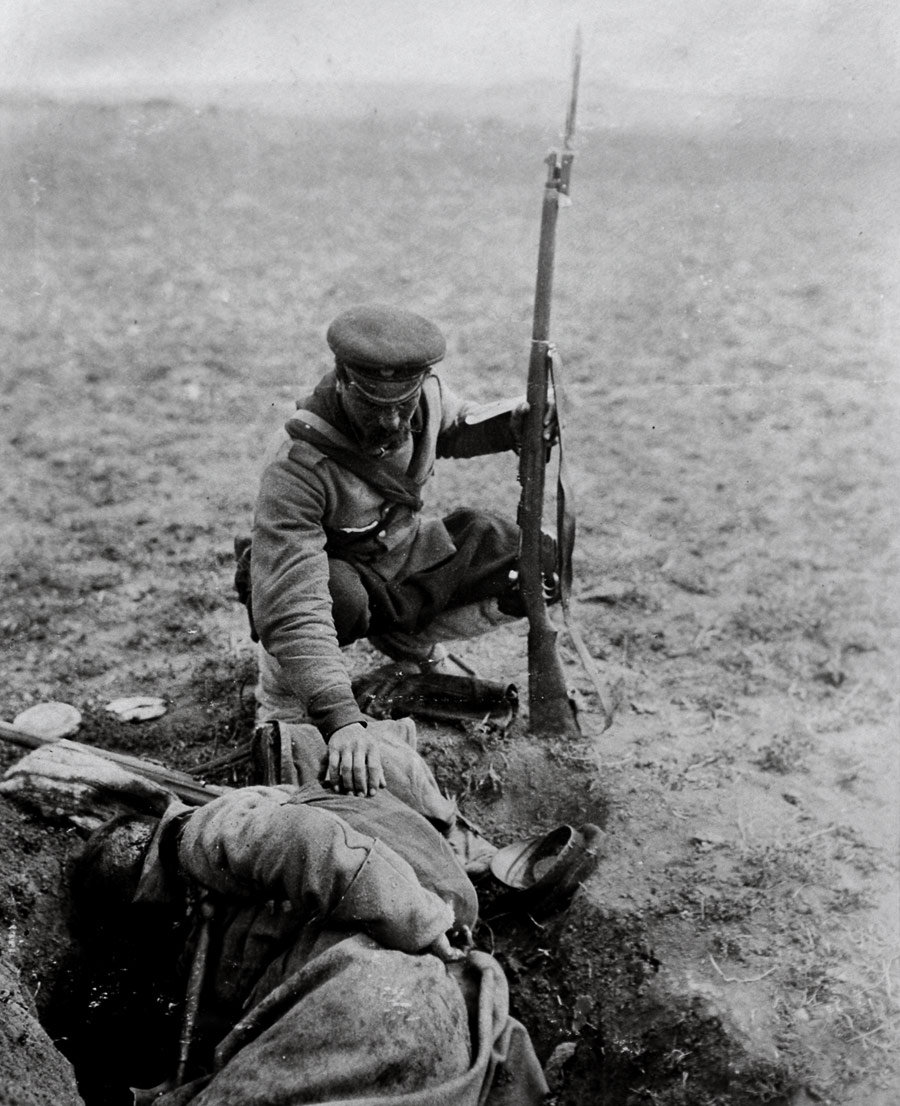
Bulgarian soldier with a fallen comrade during the First Balkan War

- Principality of Albania: Approx. 4000 rifles were ordered by the Albanian Revolutionary Committee in 1911. Albania also received a number of rifles after First World War as war reparations.
- Arab League: Some Italian M1895 rifles were used in a limited capacity by Arab forces during the 1948 Arab-Israeli War.
- First Austrian Republic: In service from October 1918 to the Anschluss.
- Austria-Hungary: In service from 1895 to Dissolution of Austria-Hungary in 1918. Mainly saw action during World War I as the standard-issue rifle of the Austro-Hungarian Army.
  - Hungary, used after the Great War
- Kingdom of Bulgaria: Starting in 1898 Bulgaria began importing M95 Mannlicher rifles, in the beginning exclusively from Steyr and later also from Budapest. Approx. 83,000 long rifles and 2,000 carbines were imported. These can be identified by a Bulgarian lion crest stamped on chamber and the manufacturer's name on the left side of the receiver. M95s, including guns captured by the USSR, were used by the post-war People's Republic of Bulgaria.
- Czechoslovakia: Czechoslovakia had about 200,000 Mannlicher M95s in their possession-they were considered the standard rifle until the adoption of the Vz. 98/22 and subsequent Vz. 24. The Zbrojovka Brno factory manufactured an unknown number of M95 barrels, stocks and barrel bands before switching to Mauser series production. Most were sold to Bulgaria in the 1930s, but some remained in storage until World War II.
- Sudetendeutsches Freikorps
- Finland: Finland obtained approximately 2300 rifles during the 1920s in the 8×50mmR Mannlicher caliber. They were marked SA and are valuable among collectors.
- Ethiopian Empire: acquired Mannlicher rifles during the interwar period, mostly in the original 8×50mmR caliber (though some M95/30s have been found in Ethiopian storage). Some ex-Italian carbines were also used until 1946.
- German Empire: It was adapted by other units and the Tsingtao police, a force of Chinese gendarmes led by German officers and NCOs from the III. Seebataillon in German-occupied Kiautschou.
  - Nazi Germany: Used by German police and Volkssturm during World War II.
- Kingdom of Greece: Greece had a number of M95/24 and M95M rifles chambered for the 7.92×57mm Mauser, most likely of Yugoslavian (Serbian) origin, and were carried to Greece by Yugoslavian forces escaping from the Germans during World War 2. After the Axis occupation of Greece in April 1941, the guns arrived at the disposal of the Wehrmacht under the designation Gewehr 306(g) for the Rifle Model 1895, Karabiner 494(g) for the Carbine Model 1895/24, and Karabiner 505(g) for the Carbine Model 1895.
- Kingdom of Hungary (1920–46): After the dissolution of the dual monarchy, the Hungarian part was allowed to keep 57776 M95 rifles and carbines, however by 1921 115000 were in the possession of the Army, by the start of WW2 some 500,000 were available. Some 31M rifles are still used for ceremonial purposes.
- Israel: Some Italian M1895 rifles were used in a limited capacity by Israeli forces during the 1948 Arab-Israeli War.
- Kingdom of Italy: Captured on the Italian Front and received as war reparations. By 1937, over 200,000 M.95s in the original caliber were stockpiled in Italian East Africa. They were predominately used by colonial troops. These are often marked AOI for Africa Orientale Italiana. Rifles captured by the British were shipped to India as trainers.
- Kenya: very limited numbers
- Internal Macedonian Revolutionary Organization: Supplied by the Kingdom of Bulgaria.
- Second Polish Republic: Surplus Austro-Hungarian rifles were used during the Polish-Soviet War and more were received by armed police in the 1920s. Many were sold as aid to the Spanish Republicans in the late 1930s.
- Qing dynasty: The elite Wuwei Corps was equipped with a significant number of imported Mannlicher rifles.
- Kingdom of Romania: Purchased during the Balkan wars, later captured or obtained from Russia and initially issued to second line troops. During the interwar period, under a process called "unified armament" (Romanian: "armament unificat"), many Mannlichers M1895 rifles, carabines and Schwarzlose HMGs were re-bored to 7.92×57mm Mauser to use the same ammo as the standard Romanian weapons (ZB vz. 24 rifles, ZB vz.30 LMG, ZB vz. 37 HMG etc). The rifles and carbines were appreciated by cavalry units for its accuracy and better rate of fire and was still in use in World War II.
- Russian Empire / Russian Republic / Russian State (1918–1920): During the First World War, captured rifles were widely used in the Russian army because of the lack of domestic rifles and cartridges for them. Russian captured rifles may carry a Cyrillic letter П (P). Russian efforts to convert their service rifle, the turning bolt-action Mosin–Nagant to self-loading action were unsuccessful, that's why they decided to alter the straight-pull Mannlicher M1895 rifle, but arrived to the conclusion that development of automatic rifles requires a different approach by inventors.
  - Russian Soviet Federative Socialist Republic / Soviet Union: A sizeable quantity of M1895 rifles were captured by the Red Army during the Russian Civil War. Some were also purchased from the Polish government during the interwar period.
- Kingdom of Serbia: Captured during the Balkan Wars from Bulgaria and Austria-Hungary during World War I, also received as war reparations in original caliber. Passed on to the Kingdom of Yugoslavia.
- Francoist Spain: During the Spanish Civil War, the Soviet NKVD Agency supplied the Republican Forces in Spain with 20,000 Mannlicher Wz.95 rifles and carbines purchased from the Polish Ministry of Defense. The rifle shipment did not reach its intended users; it was captured by Franco's Nationalists. Most Spanish Civil War weapons ended up on the U.S. surplus market during 1959–62. These guns may have additional Spanish Civil War markings and various graffiti.
- Spanish Republic: Received a small shipment of M1895s from the Soviet Union and Poland, which were used in the Spanish Civil War.
- West Ukrainian People's Republic: In service with the Ukrainian Galician Army.
- Yemen
- Kingdom of Serbs, Croats and Slovenes / Yugoslavia: Yugoslavia inherited a great number of Mannlicher rifles from territories that were part of Austria-Hungary up to the end of First World War and from the Kingdom of Serbia. Rifles in original configuration were used by the Gendarmerie. Around 122,000 were converted to 7.92×57mm Mauser caliber as the M95/24 and M95M. M95M rifles captured by the Wehrmacht under the designation Gewehr 294(j) (despite being considered a carbine by the Yugoslavs), with unconverted M95 rifles and carbines receiving the designation Gewehr 306(j) and Karabiner 505(j) respectively. Some were used by the post-war Yugoslav People's Army.

== See also ==
- Mannlicher M1890 carbine
- Mannlicher M1888
- Weapons of the Austro-Hungarian Empire
- M1895 Lee Navy – An American straight-pull rifle
- Ross rifle – A Canadian straight-pull rifle
- Schmidt-Rubin rifle - A Swiss straight-pull rifle
