= 35M rifle =

35M Puska (35M Rifle)
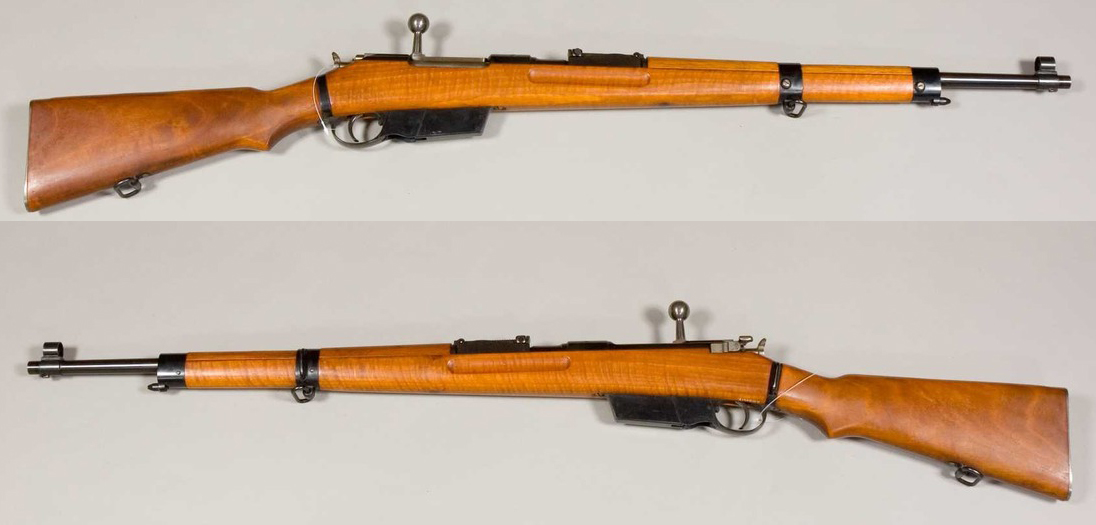
- 35M Rifle from the Swedish Army Museum.
- Type: Bolt-action service rifle
- Place of origin: Kingdom of Hungary

Service history
- In service: 1935–1950s
- Used by: Kingdom of Hungary; Soviet Union; Nazi Germany; People's Republic of Hungary
- Wars: Slovak–Hungarian War; World War II; Hungarian Revolution of 1956

Production history
- Designer: FÉG
- Designed: 1935
- Manufacturer: FÉG possiblyDanuvia
- Produced: 1935–1950s
- No. built: 35M: 186,600; G98/40: 138,400; 43M: 91,500

Specifications
- Mass: 3.98 kilograms (8.8 lb)
- Length: 1,110 millimetres (44 in)
- Barrel length: 600 millimetres (24 in)
- Cartridge: 8×56mmR 35M; 7.92×57mm Mauser G98/40 and 43M
- Action: Bolt-action
- Muzzle velocity: 730 m/s (2,395 ft/s)
- Feed system: 5-round en bloc clip, internal box magazine
- Sights: open Partridge rear sight, square post front sight

The FÉG 35M was a bolt-action rifle chambered in 8×56mmR. Though superficially still resembling the 95/31M Carbine, it was a new design with a cock-on-close bolt. An easily recognizable distinguishing feature was the placement of the bolt handle, which was further forward than in the 1895 design. It was used by Hungary in the years leading up to and during World War II, as well as after World War II, yet was gradually phased out by both Red Army surplus, and locally produced Mosin–Nagant carbines in the years after.

== Design details ==
After the Great War, modifications were made on the 95M carbines, recalibrating the sights to the newly adopted metric system, and later adopting the Austrian-developed 8x56mmR. Analysing the performance of the 95M in World War I had revealed several deficiencies: the straight-pull Mannlicher could freeze in cold; the bolts were hand-fitted, thus non-interchangeable - being replaced only by trained gunsmiths; and the cock-on-opening operation. In the end, it was decided that the new rifle should use a simpler, more conventional rotating bolt, as well as a better bayonet.

For the new requirements, the Hungarian military and FÉG took the Mannlicher–Schönauer action, derived from the bolt of the Gewehr 88, which was also used on Romanian and Dutch Mannlichers. A prototype, known as 33.M, was produced in small series for trials in 1933. The prototype differed from the final 35.M in the following ways:

- G98-type bayonet was replaced with a crosspiece and press stud arrangement modelled on the Berthier from an earlier 1923 prototype, but with a flat blade and not a cruciform proper;
- the bolt handle was moved forward in front of the receiver bridge to strengthen the action;
- the metal part of the receiver separating the forearm from the buttstock was moved backward, from around the magazine to the same position as on Lee-Enfield;
- the Arisaka-type sliding receiver cover was abandoned.

At around the same time, Steyr-Solothurn proposed a competitive design based on the ŒWG 1917 G98 modernization, which was serially produced in China, yet never adopted.

All the springs in the rifle except the one in the sight are coil springs. The new safety could be engaged both when the rifle was cocked and uncocked. The barrel was lengthened and the distance between front and rear sights was increased. A British-style two-piece stock avoided the need to import extremely dimensionally stable wood.

== 43M and Gewehr 98/40 ==
During World War II, military cooperation with Germany and a shortage of standard Mauser K98k rifles in the Wehrmacht led to modifications to the 35M. It was rechambered to the standard German 7.92×57 IS cartridge with a fully enclosed flush magazine, the bolt handle was made angled, the bayonet socket was changed to accept German bayonets and some alterations were made to the sling mount. In addition, the rifle was adopted to use standard Mauser 5-round charger clips and its sights were recalibrated to match the ballistics of the 7.92mm IS cartridge.

In German service this modified weapon was known as the Gewehr 98/40. Hungary also adopted this version, slightly modified, as the 43M.

== Comparable contemporary firearms ==
- Steyr M95
- MAS-36
- Type 99 Arisaka
- Karabiner 98k
- Mosin–Nagant
- Lee-Enfield
- Carcano M1938

== See also ==
- List of World War II firearms of Germany
- Weapons employed in the Slovak-Hungarian War
