= Mannlicher M1890 =

Mannlicher M1890 can refer to:

- Mannlicher M1890 carbine, a carbine that used a straight-pull bolt action with two solid lugs
- Mannlicher M1890 rifle, a variant of the Mannlicher M1888 rifle produced after 1890
