= MG 30 =

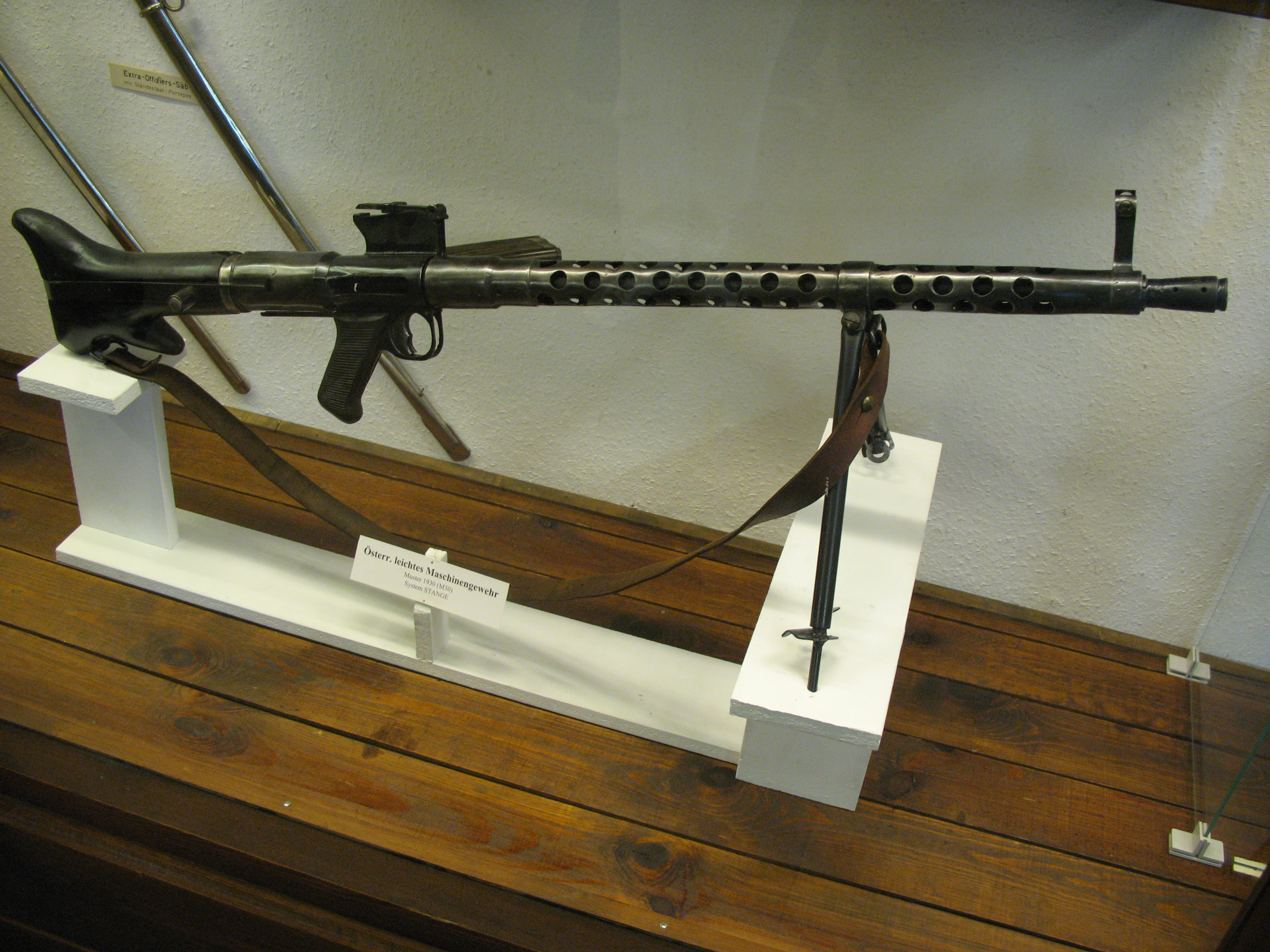
- The MG 30 on display in Austria. (Festung Hohensalzburg)
- Type: Light machine gun
- Place of origin: Switzerland; Austria

Service history
- In service: 1930–1950s
- Used by: See § Users
- Wars: Austrian Civil War; Slovak–Hungarian War; World War II; Hungarian Revolution of 1956

Production history
- Designer: Louis Stange
- Designed: 1929
- Manufacturer: See § Manufacturers
- Produced: Solothurn S2-200: 1930–1940; Solothurn 31.M: 1931–1943; Solothurn 43.M: 1943–1944
- No. built: ~17,000

Specifications
- Mass: Solothurn S2-200: 9.5 kg (20.9 lb); Solothurn 31.M: 8.4 kg (18.5 lb)
- Length: 1,162 mm (45.7 in)
- Barrel length: 600 mm (24 in)
- Cartridge: 7.92×57mm Mauser; 8×56mmR; 7×57mm Mauser.303 British
- Action: Recoil
- Rate of fire: Cyclic: 450-500 Rounds/min; Practical: 100 Rounds/min
- Muzzle velocity: 807.92 m/s (2,650 ft/s)
- Effective firing range: 800 m
- Feed system: 30-round box magazine (7.92×57mm; 7×57mm); 25-round box magazine (8×56mmR, .303 British)

The Maschinengewehr 30, or MG 30 was a German-designed machine gun that saw some service with various armed forces in the 1930s. It was also modified to become the standard German aircraft gun as the MG 15 and MG 17. It is most notable as the design pattern that led to the MG 34 and therefor indirectly the MG 42, and thus is one of the major ancestors of many of the weapons in service which would later find widespread use into the 21st century.

== History ==
Development of the MG 30 took place under the direction of Louis Stange at Rheinmetall's Sömmerda office, from where he filed several patent claims in 1928–1929. However, actual production of machine guns was prohibited in Germany under the Versailles Treaty. Rheinmetall circumvented the provisions by acquiring the majority shareholding of the Swiss manufacturer Waffenfabrik Solothurn and relocating production there. The goal was to acquire orders for the rearmament of the Reichswehr, which was modernizing its arsenal.

The design was rejected by the German Reichswehr which adopted the MG 13. Rheinmetall then turned to other companies and licensed the design to Solothurn in Switzerland and Steyr-Daimler-Puch in Austria. Production soon followed, entering the armed forces of both countries as the Solothurn S2-200 and Maschinengewehr Solothurn 1930, or MG 30, respectively.

1250 were also purchased by Hungary from Solothurn, where it was known as the Solothurn 31.M Golyószóró. The FÉG factory in Budapest undertook licensed production and from 1931 to 1937, a few hundred were produced each year, by 1938 around 3000 had been acquired. From 1938 to 1943, an additional 7350 were produced. (Note: Every rifle company had 12 Solothurns, nine equipped with bipods as light machine guns, and three equipped with tripods as medium machine guns.) In 1943, the decision was made for all newly produced rifles and machineguns to be in 7.92x57mm instead of 8x56mmR, production therefor switched over to the Solothurn 43.M Golyószóró (essentially a 31.M in 7.92) of which 1683 were made between in 1943 and 1944. A total of more than 13,000 of these guns were acquired by the Hungarian Armed Forces and Székely National Guard of Transylvania. The examples which survived the war were kept in storage until 1956, after which almost all of them were melted down.

== Design ==
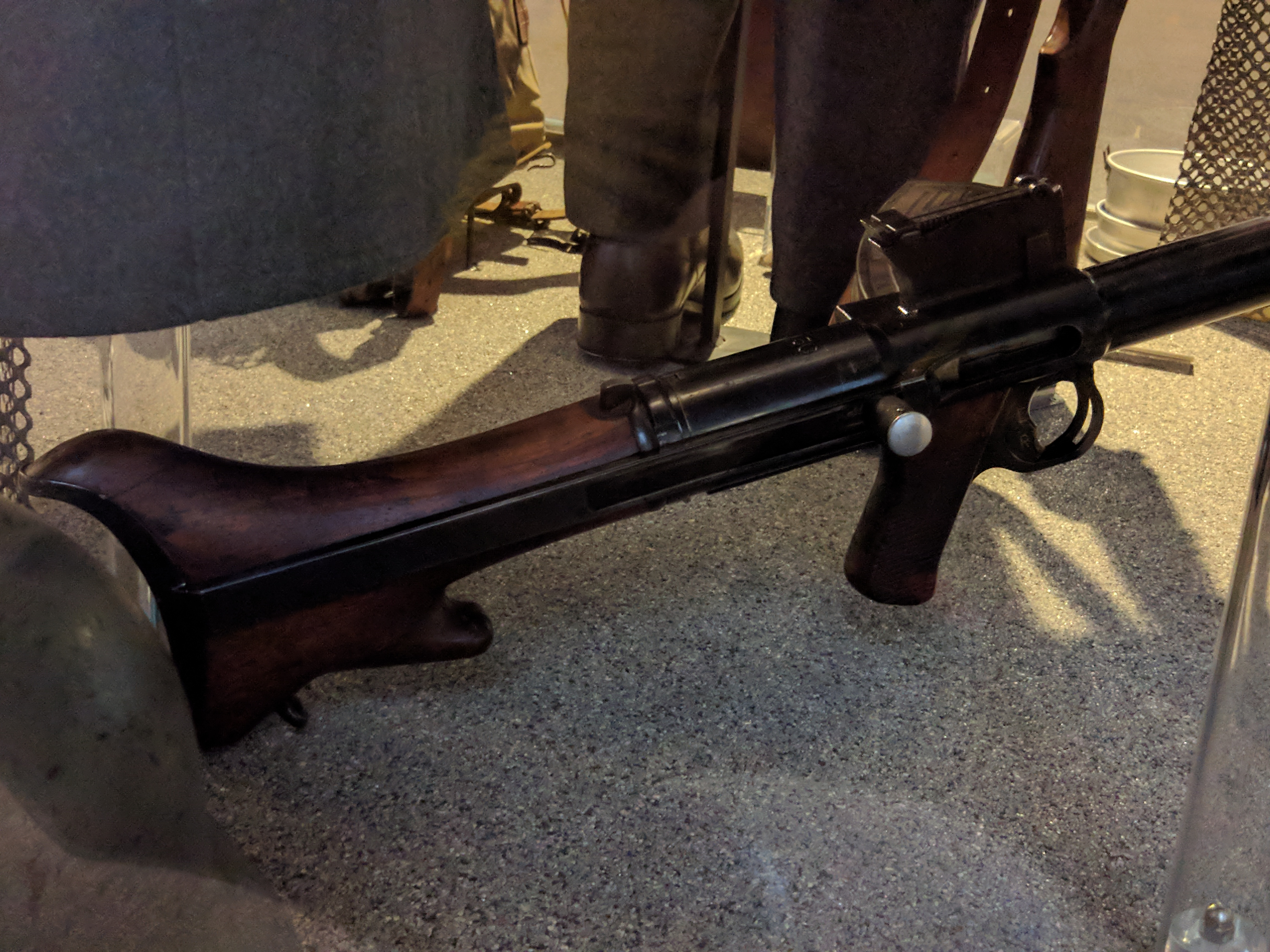
Fire control column and buttstock of the MG 30.

The gun is an air-cooled, recoil-operated design, firing standard 8×56mmR ammunition, fed from a slightly curved 25-round magazine inserted in the left side of the weapon. It uses a locking ring, which is located at the end of the barrel extension, to lock the bolt. Inside the locking ring, there are six sets of locking lugs, arranged as an interrupted thread, which mate with lugs cut at the rear of the bolt. Rotation of the ring, which locks and unlocks the bolt, is controlled in a mount on the outside of the ring. The gun is of relatively simple design, with most parts having a round cross-section. The tubular receiver is an extension of the barrel jacket. The butt hosts a tube which contains the return spring and its guide. Safety is found on the receiver.

The MG 30 fired both in semi-automatic and full automatic mode depending on how far the two-stage trigger is pulled, with a rate of fire between 450 and 500 rounds per minute in full-auto. It included a folding bipod attached two-thirds down the barrel.

== Further developments ==
=== Germany ===
Rheinmetall's Borsig office modified the MG 30 design for use as an aircraft gun, producing the Flugzeugmaschinengewehr 15, or MG 15 machine gun. The primary changes were the use of a double-drum magazine holding 75 rounds, and the removal of the stock for use inside the cramped quarters of a bomber.

Further modification in 1936 led to the MG 17, which included provisions for belt-fed ammo in addition to the drums, increased the rate of fire to about 1,200 rpm, and with its design incorporating a closed-bolt firing cycle, was suitable for use on a synchronization gear system-equipped aircraft for shooting through the aircraft's own propeller.

7.92×57mm weapons were no longer considered useful by the Luftwaffe once enough MG 131s were available. The partial armour protection of most new military aircraft had caught up with the 7.92×57mm SmK cartridge by 1940. Many MG 15, MG 17 and more modern 7.92 mm MG 81 were then used by forces on the ground, especially from 1944. Many were modified with a bipod and simple metal stock, and other belt-fed MG 17 and MG 81 were built into dedicated anti-air machine gun twin and quad mounts.

=== Hungary ===
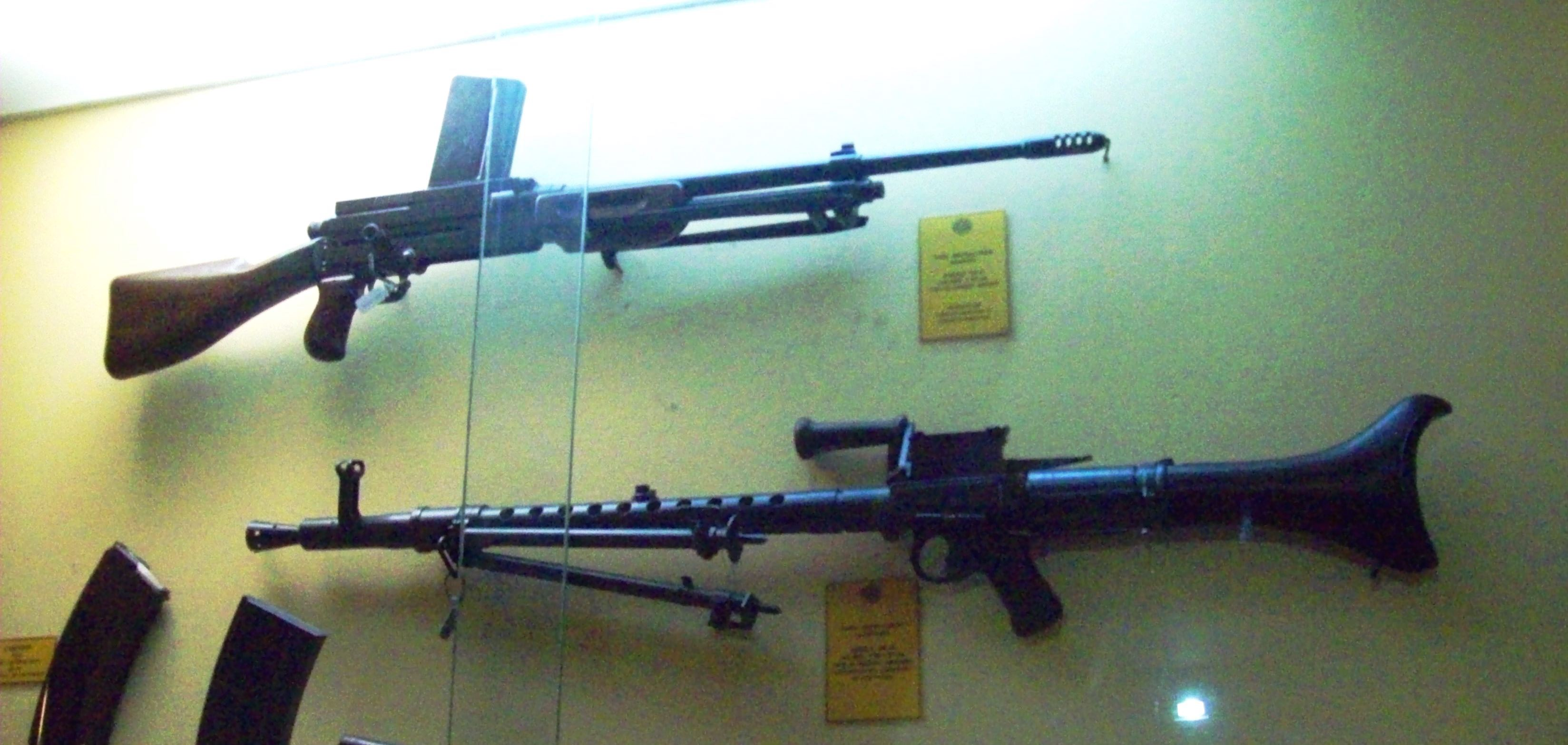
A Hungarian 31M (seen on the bottom) next to a Mendoza RM2 (top)

Hungarian LMGs were different: there was a free-rotating swivel handle near the machine gun's center of gravity. The bipod was not part of the barrel jacket, the fixing clamp could rotate and the fixing springs of the bipod legs were also different. The tripod for Hungarian machine guns was equipped with an attachment so they could also be used as an anti-aircraft machine gun, which was also used in the mountains (Carpathians) for firing at high angles. The 31.M.s equipped with tripods served as medium machine guns, and those equipped with only bipods served as light machine guns. The bipod was also retained on the medium machine guns. A small number of 31. M. machine guns were converted as flexible machine guns for the Royal Hungarian Air Force. The handle and the bipod were removed from these, and their 75-round magazine was based on the German model. These were used on some light reconnaissance aircraft until they were replaced by Gebauer machine guns after 1940-41. They remained in use as anti-aircraft machine guns on the river patrol boats (River Flotilla). In 1943, the decision was made to switch from 8x56mmR over to 7.92x57mm in order to share supply lines with Germany. Because of this, a new variant of the 31.M was introduced called the Solothurn 43.M, essentially a 31.M in 7.92 caliber.

== Manufacturers ==
- Waffenfabrik Solothurn
- Steyr-Werke AG
- FÉG
- Danuvia

== Users ==
- Austria – at least 3000 bought in 7.92x57mm
- Bulgaria— 244 former Austrian army 7.92mm light machine guns were delivered in 1939, with another delivery of 500 following that in late 1940.Further deliveries in the following years brought the available "Steyr"s to at least 940, although 1233 are shown as available on 01.01.1944, 826 by 01.01.1945 and 982 by 01.01.1946.
- El Salvador − 47 guns made in 7×57mm Mauser.
- Nazi Germany – Former Austrian guns, mostly used by Gebirgsjäger
- Hungary − Initially 1250 were bought in 1931 from solothurn, local production would start soon after, by 1938 around 3000 were in the possession of the army, another 7350 were produced by FÉG in Hungary between 1938 and 1943 under the name Solothurn 31.M Golyószóró in 8x56mmR, in 1943 production switched over to the Solothurn 43.M Golyószóró ( essentially a 31.M in 7.92) of which 1683 were made between in 1943 and 1944, a unknown quantity of both versions were also made by Danuvia.
- Switzerland – Trials only
- Republic of China – 50 bought buy a delegation in 1932 likely in 7.92 Mauser
- United Kingdom – A singular example bought for trials in .303 British
- United States – One S2-200 bought for trials

== See also ==
=== Weapons of comparable role, performance and era ===
- MG 13, predecessor
- MG 15, developed from the MG 30.
- MG 17, developed from the MG 30 via MG 15.
- MG 34, direct successor of MG 30.
