= Clip (firearms) =

Device used to store multiple rounds of ammunition for loading into a firearm

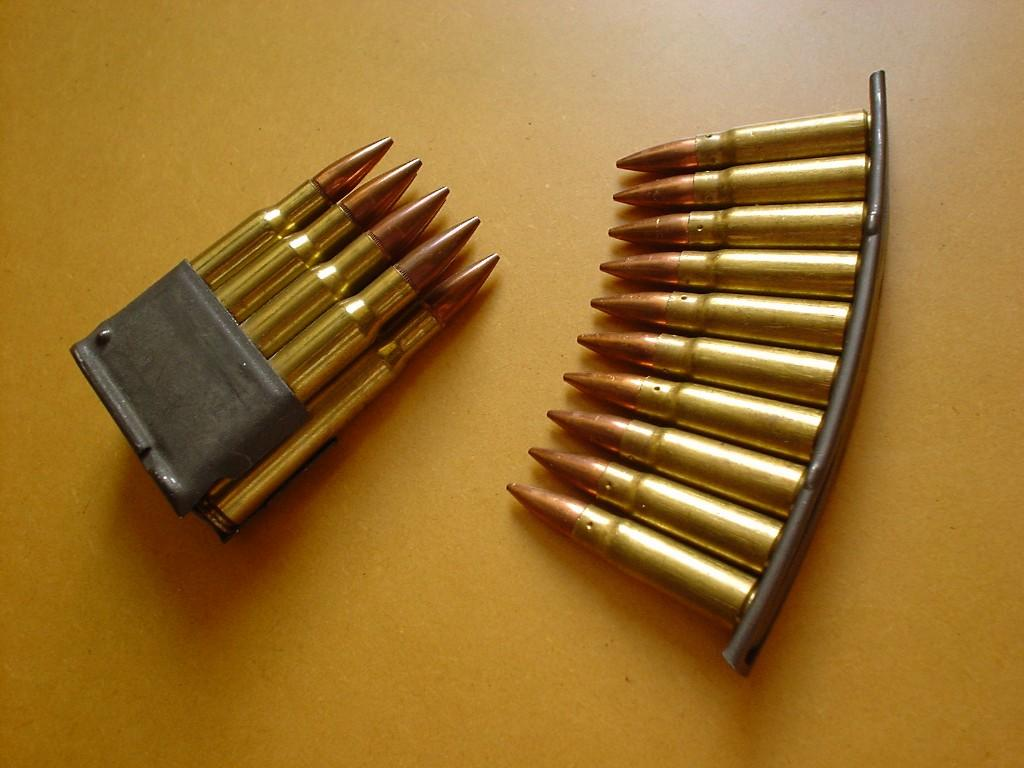
An M1 Garand en bloc clip (left) compared to an SKS stripper clip (right)

A clip is a device that is used to store multiple rounds of ammunition together as a unit for insertion into the magazine or cylinder of a firearm. This speeds up the process by loading the firearm with multiple rounds simultaneously, rather than individually, as with loose rounds of ammunition. There are several types, most made of inexpensive stamped sheet metal, which are generally intended to be disposable, although they are more often retained and reused.

== Types ==
=== Stripper ===
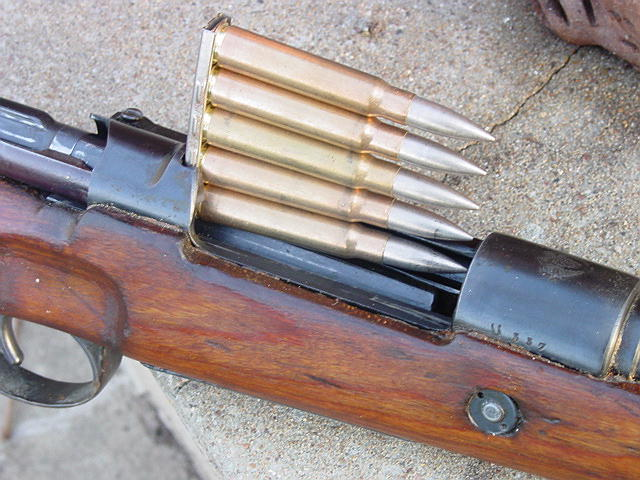
Loading a 7.92×57mm Mauser Karabiner 98k rifle with a five-round stripper clip.

A stripper clip (American English) or charger clip (Commonwealth English) is a speedloader that holds several pistol or rifle cartridges as a unit for easier loading into a firearm's internal box magazine. After the bolt is opened and the stripper clip is placed in position (generally in a slot on the receiver or bolt), the cartridges are pressed down, removing or "stripping" them off the clip and into the magazine. The clip is then either removed and tossed away, or the bolt is thrown forward, expelling the clip automatically. However, some weapons, such as the Mosin–Nagant, require the operator to manually remove the empty clip. Some weapons designed for stripper clip use include the Mannlicher M1894, Mauser C96, Roth–Steyr M1907, Lee-Enfield, Mosin–Nagant, Gewehr 98, M1903 Springfield, SKS, Vz. 58 and T48 rifle. Detachable magazines may also be loaded with stripper clips provided they have a special guide attached, as in the M14 rifle or M16 rifle.

=== En bloc ===
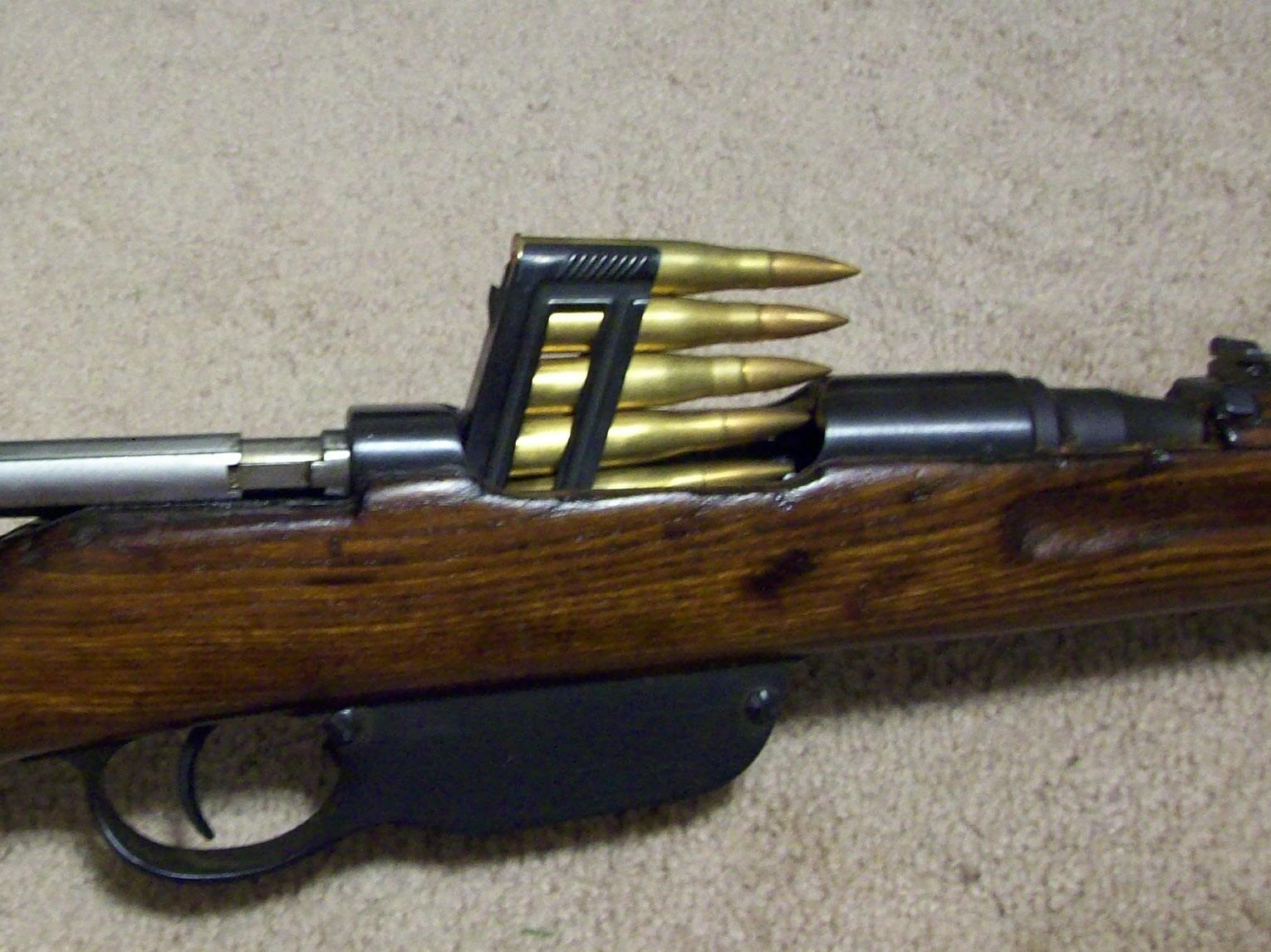
An en bloc clip of 8×56mmR is inserted into a Steyr M95 carbine.

Several rifle designs utilize an en bloc clip for loading. With this design, both the cartridges and clip are inserted as a unit into a fixed magazine within the rifle, and the clip is usually ejected or falls from the rifle upon firing or chambering of the last round. The en bloc clip was invented by Ferdinand Mannlicher for use in his Model 1885, Model 1886, and 1888 rifles.

Other rifles utilizing en bloc clips include the German Gewehr 88 (since 1905 replaced by stripper clips), the Mexican Mondragón, the French Berthier Mle 1890 and RSC Mle 1917, the Italian M1870/87 Vetterli-Vitali, and M1891 Carcano, the various (Romanian, Dutch, and Portuguese) turn-bolt Mannlichers, the Austro-Hungarian straight-pull Steyr-Mannlicher M1895, the Hungarian FÉG 35M, and the American M1895 Lee Navy, M1 Garand, and Pedersen T1E3. Original Austrian Mannlicher clips were often uni-directional, but already the Gewehr 88 and subsequently the M1891 Carcano used symmetrical clips. John Pedersen at first developed a irreversible clip for his rifle, later he redesigned the clip to be reversible. This design was also utilized for the competing designs by John Garand.

=== Moon and half-moon ===
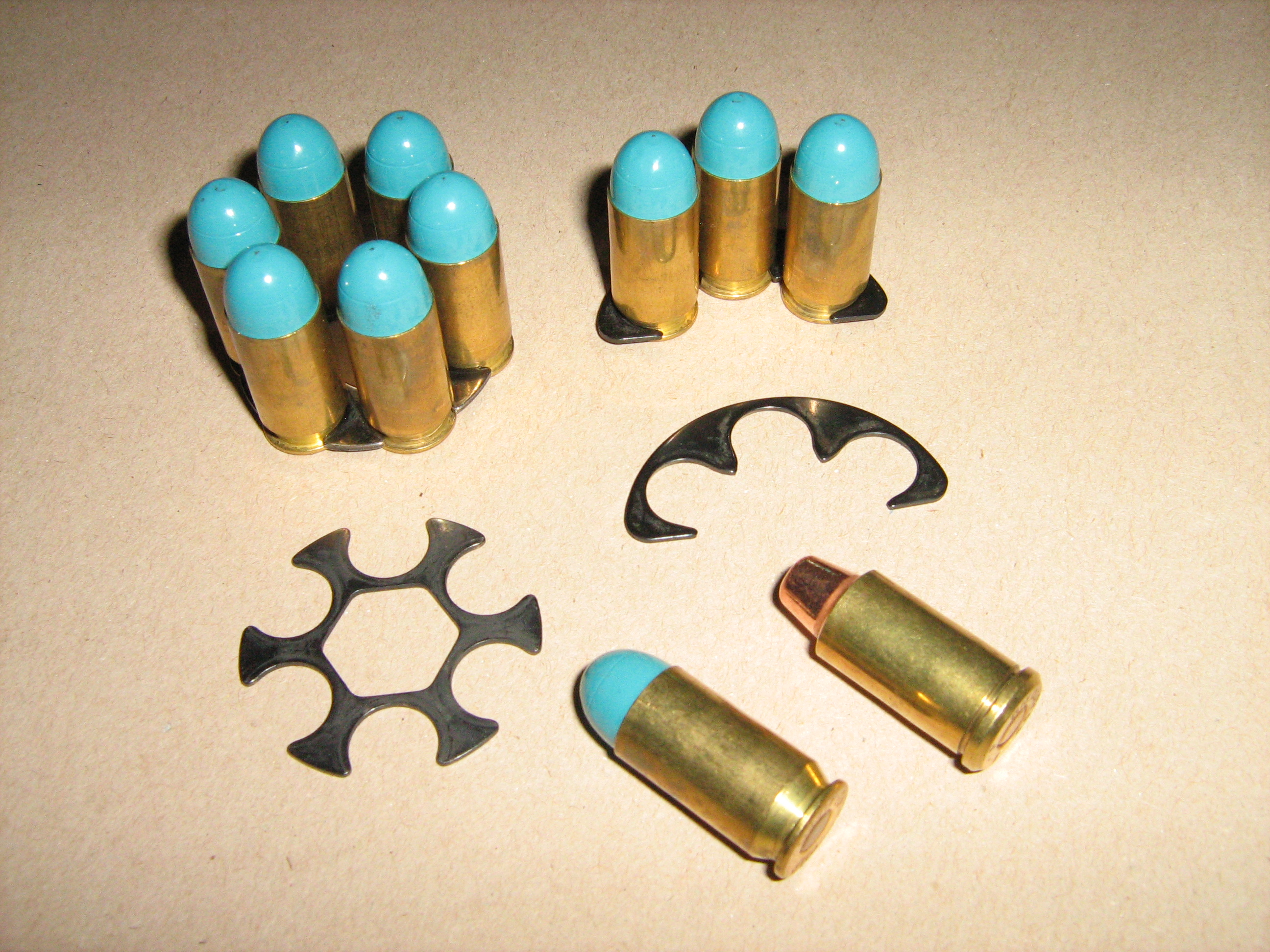
Full moon and half-moon clips for M1917 revolvers. The .45 Auto Rim cartridge may be used in a revolver's cylinder without the clips.

A moon clip is a ring-shaped or stellate piece of metal designed to hold a full cylinder of ammunition for a revolver (commonly 6 rounds) together as a unit. Therefore, instead of loading or extracting one round at a time, a full cylinder of ammunition or spent cases can be loaded or extracted at once, speeding the loading process. A similar device known as a "half-moon clip" is semi-circular and designed to hold a half cylinder of ammunition (commonly 3 rounds) in which case two clips are necessary to fully load the cylinder. Such devices have most often been used to chamber rimless semi-automatic pistol cartridges into a revolver, but they can also be used with rimmed cartridges to allow for the faster loading and/or unloading of a revolver.

== See also ==
- List of clip-fed firearms
- Belt (firearms)
- Glossary of firearms terms
- Stripper clip
- Speedloader
