= Miroslav Martić =

Serbian politician

Miroslav Martić (Serbian Cyrillic: Мирослав Мартић; born 25 October 1951) is a Serbian former politician. He served in the Serbian parliament from 2001 to 2012 and was the mayor of Užice from 2000 to 2006. During his time as an elected official, Martić was a member of the Democratic Party (DS).

== Early life and career ==
Martić was born in Užice (known at the time as Titovo Užice), in what was then the People's Republic of Serbia in the Federal People's Republic of Yugoslavia. Raised in the city, he later graduated from the University of Sarajevo Faculty of Political Science. He returned to Užice after his graduation, worked for a time in the Copper and Aluminum Rolling Mill, and was employed at the Užice Gymnasium as a sociology teacher until 1996.

== Politician ==
=== 1990–2003 ===
Martić joined the Democratic Party on its formation in 1990. During the 1990s, Serbia's political culture was dominated by Slobodan Milošević, leader of the Socialist Party of Serbia (SPS).

The DS contested the 1996 Serbian local elections as part of the Zajedno (English: Together) alliance of opposition parties. Zajedno won majority victories in several major cities during this cycle, including in Užice, where it won thirty-eight out of sixty-seven seats. When the city assembly convened on 14 December 1996, Milan Nikitović of the Serbian Renewal Movement (SPO) was chosen as its president, a position that was then equivalent to mayor, and Martić became vice-president, equivalent to deputy mayor. Martić represented the city on an official visit to Moscow in 1997, to mark a performance by the National Theatre Užice in the Russian capital.

In 2000, the Democratic Party joined the Democratic Opposition of Serbia (DOS), a broad and ideologically diverse coalition of parties opposed to the Milošević regime. DOS candidate Vojislav Koštunica defeated Milošević in the 2000 Yugoslavian presidential election, and Milošević fell from power on 5 October 2000, a watershed moment in Serbian politics. The DOS also won victories in several cities and municipalities in the 2000 Serbian local elections, which took place concurrently with the Yugoslavian vote; in Užice, the alliance won a landslide victory with fifty seats. Martić was chosen as assembly president on 12 October 2000.

The Serbian government fell after Milošević's defeat in the Yugoslavian vote, and a new Serbian parliamentary election was called for December 2000. Prior to the vote, Serbia's electoral laws were reformed such that the country became a single at-large electoral division, and all mandates were assigned to candidates on successful lists at the discretion of the sponsoring parties or coalitions, irrespective of numerical order. Martić appeared in the 122nd position on the DOS's electoral list and was assigned a mandate after the list won a landslide victory with 176 seats. He took his seat when the assembly convened in January 2001. In his first term, he served on the committee on interethnic relations and the committee on labour, veterans, and social affairs. In January 2002, he supported the government's Draft Law on Local Self-Government, which introduced the direct election of mayors and returned a number of powers to the municipalities.

During Martić's first mayoral term, he oversaw long-running projects for the construction of a gas pipeline for the city and a water supply system for the suburban Bela Zemlja area. Although the DOS coalition began to fragment at the republic level in 2001, it remained stable within the municipal government for the full duration of the term.

=== 2003–2012 ===
The DS contested the 2003 Serbian parliamentary election at the head of its own alliance. Martić appeared in the 180th position on its electoral list and was given a mandate for a second term after the list won thirty-seven seats. The rival Democratic Party of Serbia (DSS) emerged as the dominant party in Serbia's coalition government after the election, and the DS served in opposition. In his second term, Martić was once again a member of the labour committee.

For the 2004 local elections, the Serbian government separated the offices of mayor and assembly president and introduced direct mayoral elections. Martić was elected to a second term as mayor of Užice, defeating a candidate of the SPS in the second round. The DS subsequently formed a new local coalition government with the DSS, the SPO, the Civic Alliance of Serbia (GSS), the Social Democratic Party (SDP), and the Democratic Alternative (DA). In November 2005, G17 Plus joined the coalition as well. In early 2006, Martić signed a memorandum on new recycling services in the municipality. In this period, he was a frequent critic and rival of Velimir Ilić, the leader of New Serbia and Serbia's minister of capital investments. Martić was ultimately removed from the mayoral office in a recall election in May 2006.

Martić later appeared in the 126th position on the DS's electoral list in the 2007 Serbian parliamentary election. The list won sixty-four seats, and he was assigned a mandate for a third term. The DS, DSS, and G17 Plus formed an unstable coalition government after the election, and Martić was a government supporter. He once again served on the labour committee and was also a member of the committee on constitutional issues.

The alliance between the DS and DSS broke down in early 2008, and a new parliamentary election took place in May of that year. The DS contested the election at the head of an alliance called For a European Serbia (ZES), and Martić appeared in the 116th position on its list. The ZES list won 102 seats, and he received a mandate afterward for a fourth term. Although the election did not produce a clear winner, the ZES alliance ultimately formed a coalition government with the Socialist Party of Serbia, and Martić once again served as a government supporter. In his final assembly term, he once again served on the labour committee and the constitutional affairs committee and was a deputy member of the legislative committee and the committee for Kosovo and Metohija, as well as being a member of Serbia's parliamentary friendship groups with Belgium, Portugal, Russia, Slovenia, and Spain. He was not a candidate in the 2012 parliamentary election.

== Electoral record ==
=== Local (Užice) ===
2004 Užice local election: Mayor of Užice
Candidate	Party	First round		Second round	
Candidate	Party	Votes	%	Votes	%
Miroslav Martić (incumbent)	Democratic Party	4,874	23.82	7,041	51.81
Milovan Petrović	Socialist Party of Serbia	2,425	11.85	6,548	48.19
Nadežda Milivojević	Serbian Radical Party	2,011	9.83		
Đorđe Mijušković	Serbian Renewal Movement	1,879	9.18		
Dragan Nešović	League for Užice	1,299	6.35		
Danijela Đorđević	Strength of Serbia Movement	1,278	6.25		
Desimir Mićović	Democratic Party of Serbia	1,208	5.90		
Ivan Milutinović	Entrepreneurs' Group – Citizens	1,152	5.63		
Zoran Plećević	Civic Alliance of Serbia	1,116	5.45		
Ilija Misailović	Citizens' Group: Dr. Ilija Misailović	920	4.50		
Borko Tanović	Citizens' Group	870	4.25		
Dušan Novaković	G17 Plus	806	3.94		
Boris Karaičić	People's Democratic Party	624	3.05		
Total		20,462	100.00	13,589	100.00
Valid votes		20,462	97.64	13,589	98.35
Invalid/blank votes		494	2.36	228	1.65
Total votes		20,956	100.00	13,817	100.00
Registered voters/turnout		69,214	30.28	69,214	19.96

Martić was subsequently defeated in a recall election held on 21 May 2006.

Choice	Votes	%
Yes on recall	9,556	54.20
No on recall	8,076	45.80
Total valid votes	17,632	100

2009 Užice local election: Division 33 (Terazije 4)
Candidate	Party	Votes	%
Miroslav Martić (incumbent)	Democratic Opposition of Serbia–Dr. Vojislav Koštunica (Affiliation: Democratic Party)		elected
Irena Matić	Serbian Renewal Movement		defeated
Aleksandar Stevanović	Serbian Radical Party		defeated
Dragomir Vuksanović	Socialist Party of Serbia–Yugoslav Left–Slobodan Milošević		defeated
Total			
Source: Matić, Stevanović, and Vuksanović are listed alphabetically.
