= Ivan Milutinović (Serbian politician) =

Serbian politician (born 1945)

Ivan Milutinović (Serbian Cyrillic: Иван Милутиновић; born 7 July 1945) is a Serbian politician who served in the Serbian parliament from 1991 to 1993. Originally a member of the Serbian Renewal Movement (SPO), he later joined the Parliamentary People's Party (SNS) and the Democratic Party of Serbia (DSS).

== Private career ==
Milutinović holds a Doctor of Mechanical Engineering degree and has worked as a university professor. He is from Užice.

== Politician ==
=== SPO parliamentarian ===
Serbian political life in the 1990s was dominated by the authoritarian rule of Slobodan Milošević, leader of the Socialist Party of Serbia (SPS).

Milutinović was elected for the Titovo Užice II constituency seat as a SPO candidate in the 1990 Serbian parliamentary election; he finished second against Socialist Party candidate Zoran Vujović in the first round of voting but managed to consolidate the support of various opposition parties to win an upset second-round victory. The Socialists won a landslide majority victory overall with 194 out of 250 seats, while the SPO, with nineteen seats, was the largest opposition group in the assembly.

Milutinović was a frequent critic of the Serbian government during the March 1991 protests in Belgrade. In June 1991, he called for an emergency debate on the difficult state of special-purpose (i.e., military) production factories in Serbia.

In April 1992, Milutinović said that he would not vote for the new constitution of the Federal Republic of Yugoslavia, on the grounds that it conceded too much power to Montenegro at the expense of Serbia.

Milutinović was among the SPO officials who met with Alexander, Crown Prince of Yugoslavia on the latter's visit to Serbia as a private citizen in July 1992. In the same month, he supported the political program put forward by new Yugoslavian prime minister Milan Panić, describing it as "the one that the Serbian Renewal Movement advocated for during the [1990] election campaign [...] and all the time after that." He added that he was disappointed Panić did not appoint a "panel of experts" for his cabinet, as had previously been discussed.

In October 1992, Milutinović and another SPO parliamentarian proposed that planned salary increases in the ministries of defence and foreign affairs and in territorial defence be cancelled, with the money to be directed instead toward milk premiums and spending on refugees and health care. While the proposal attracted some attention in the media, it was ultimately not accepted.

The SPO contested the 1992 Serbian parliamentary election as the leading party in the Democratic Movement of Serbia (DEPOS) alliance. Serbia's electoral laws were reformed prior to the vote, such that the republic adopted a system of proportional representation and a "one-third/two-thirds" rule for the distribution of mandates (i.e., one-third of mandates would be assigned to candidates on successful lists in numerical order, with the remaining two-thirds distributed to other candidates at the discretion of the sponsoring parties or coalitions). Milutinović appeared in the third position on the DEPOS list for the Užice constituency. Although DEPOS won six seats in the division, he was not automatically elected, nor was he assigned an "optional" mandate afterward. His term ended when the new assembly convened in January 1993.

Several former SPO parliamentarians, including Milutinović, resigned from the party 1994. In an open letter, they wrote that the party had become "in no way different from the Communist Party from the time of Josip Broz's absolutism" and "a private enterprise of the Drašković family with numerous relatives employed." One year later, Milutinović became a vice-president of a breakaway group called the Parliamentary People's Party (SNS).

=== DSS politician ===
Milutinović later joined the Democratic Party of Serbia (DSS) and served as vice-president of its municipal board in Užice.

In 2000, the DSS joined the Democratic Opposition of Serbia (DOS), a broad and ideologically diverse coalition of parties opposed to Slobodan Milošević's administration. DOS candidate Vojislav Koštunica defeated Milošević in the 2000 Yugoslavian presidential election, and Milošević fell from power on 5 October 2000, a watershed moment in Serbian politics. The DOS also won majority victories in several cities in the 2000 Serbian local elections, which took place concurrently with the Yugoslavian vote. In Užice, the DOS won a landslide majority victory with fifty out of sixty-seven seats. Milutinović was elected as a DOS candidate in the municipality's fifty-fourth division and served in the assembly as a supporter of the local administration.

The local branch of the DSS dismissed Milutinović and an associate from their leadership positions in late 2001, on the charge that they were "privatizing the party and using it for personal purposes." Milutinović later ran for mayor of Užice in the 2004 Serbian local elections as an independent candidate, appearing on the ballot with the designation "Entrepreneurs' Group – Citizens," and finished eighth in a crowded field. (Serbia's local election laws had been reformed prior to this campaign, such that mayors were directly elected and assemblies chosen via proportional representation.)

Milutinović seems to have become reconciled with the DSS after the 2004 campaign. In the 2008 Serbian local elections, he appeared in the twelfth position on a DSS-led coalition electoral list in Užice. The list won seventeen seats, and he was not assigned a mandate. (Note: For this election cycle, all assembly mandates were awarded to candidates on successful lists at the discretion of the sponsoring parties or coalitions, irrespective of numerical order.)

Serbia's electoral laws were reformed yet again in 2011, such that all mandates in elections held under proportional representation were assigned to candidates on successful lists in numerical order. Milutinović appeared in the sixteen position on the DSS's list for Užice in the 2012 local elections and was not elected when the list fell to seven seats. For the 2016 local elections, he appeared in the thirty-second position on a combined list of the DSS and Dveri and was not elected when the list won only four mandates.

Milutinović was given the sixteenth position on the DSS-led METLA electoral list in the 2020 local elections. The list did not cross the electoral threshold for assembly representation.

== Electoral record ==
=== Local (Užice) ===
2004 Užice local election: Mayor of Užice
Candidate	Party	First round		Second round	
Candidate	Party	Votes	%	Votes	%
Miroslav Martić (incumbent)	Democratic Party	4,874	23.82	7,041	51.81
Milovan Petrović	Socialist Party of Serbia	2,425	11.85	6,548	48.19
Nadežda Milivojević	Serbian Radical Party	2,011	9.83		
Đorđe Mijušković	Serbian Renewal Movement	1,879	9.18		
Dragan Nešović	League for Užice	1,299	6.35		
Danijela Đorđević	Strength of Serbia Movement	1,278	6.25		
Desimir Mićović	Democratic Party of Serbia	1,208	5.90		
Ivan Milutinović	Entrepreneurs' Group – Citizens	1,152	5.63		
Zoran Plećević	Civic Alliance of Serbia	1,116	5.45		
Ilija Misailović	Citizens' Group: Dr. Ilija Misailović	920	4.50		
Borko Tanović	Citizens' Group	870	4.25		
Dušan Novaković	G17 Plus	806	3.94		
Boris Karaičić	People's Democratic Party	624	3.05		
Total		20,462	100.00	13,589	100.00
Valid votes		20,462	97.64	13,589	98.35
Invalid/blank votes		494	2.36	228	1.65
Total votes		20,956	100.00	13,817	100.00
Registered voters/turnout		69,214	30.28	69,214	19.96

2000 Užice municipal election: Division 54 (Carina Division 5)
Candidate	Party	Votes	%
Ivan Milutinović	Democratic Opposition of Serbia–Dr. Vojislav Koštunica (Affiliation: Democratic Party of Serbia)		elected
Vladimir Antonijević	Socialist Party of Serbia–Yugoslav Left–Slobodan Milošević		defeated
Mića Petrović	Serbian Radical Party		defeated
Momčilo Vučković	Serbian Renewal Movement		defeated
Total			
Source: Antonijević, Petrović, and Vučković are listed alphabetically.

=== National Assembly of Serbia ===
1990 Serbian parliamentary election: Titovo Užice II
Candidate	Party	First round		Second round	
Candidate	Party	Votes	%	Votes	%
Ivan Milutinović	Serbian Renewal Movement		30.84		elected
Zoran Vujović	Socialist Party of Serbia		43.43		defeated
Dobrivoje Antonijević	New Democracy – Movement for Serbia		defeated		
Mira Jovanović	Party of Independent Entrepreneurs and Peasants		defeated		
Nada Novaković	Democratic Party		defeated		
Total					
Source: Antonijević, Jovanović, and Novaković are listed alphabetically.
