= Milan Nikitović =

Serbian politician

Milan Nikitović (Serbian Cyrillic: Милан Никитовић; 1946 – 2001) was a Serbian engineer, aphorist, and politician. He was the mayor of Užice from 1996 to 2000 and served in the Serbian parliament from 1997 to 2001. Nikitović was a member of the Serbian Renewal Movement (SPO).

== Early life and career ==
Nikitović was born in Užice, in what was then the People's Republic of Serbia in the Federal People's Republic of Yugoslavia. He completed high school in the city, graduated from the University of Belgrade Faculty of Electrical Engineering, and returned to Užice to work at the electric company, where he managed the technical sector. An active satirist, he published a book of aphorisms entitled Život u Svetlarniku (English: Life in a Skylight) in 1995. A follow-up work, simply called Svetlarnik (English: Skylight), was published posthumously in 2002.

== Politician ==
Serbian political life in the 1990s was dominated by the authoritarian rule of Slobodan Milošević, leader of the Socialist Party of Serbia (SPS).

The SPO contested the 1996 Serbian local elections as part of the opposition Zajedno (English: Together) coalition, which also included the Democratic Party (DS) and the Civic Alliance of Serbia (GSS). The coalition won majority victories in several of Serbia's largest cities, including Užice, where it won thirty-eight out of sixty-seven seats in the city assembly. Nikitović was elected as a Zajedno candidate. When the assembly convened on 14 December 1996, he was chosen as its president, a position that was then equivalent to mayor; Miroslav Martić, a member of the DS, was chosen as deputy mayor. Although the Zajedno coalition broke apart at the republic level in mid-1997, it remained intact in Užice for the term that followed.

In 1997, Nikitović ended the practice of holding Užice's municipal day on 24 September (to commemorate the Republic of Užice) and shifted the date to 9 October. He contended that the previous date was coloured by ideology, saying, "when the Užice Republic was formed, it was not fascists who left Užice, but members of the Fatherland Army of Yugoslavia."

Nikitović appeared in the lead position on the SPO's electoral list for the Užice division in the 1997 Serbian parliamentary election and was elected when the list won two seats. (From 1992 to 2000, Serbia's electoral law stipulated that one-third of parliamentary mandates would be assigned to candidates from successful lists in numerical order, while the remaining two-thirds would be distributed amongst other candidates at the discretion of the sponsoring parties or coalitions. Nikitović, as the list leader, was automatically elected.) The SPO won forty-five seats overall and served in opposition to the SPS-led administration for the term that followed. (Note: In early 1999, the SPO briefly joined a coalition government led by the Socialist Party in the Federal Republic of Yugoslavia, which comprised the republics of Serbia and Montenegro. It did not join the government at the republic level, although its opposition to the SPS was obviously more muted in this period.)

In September 1998, Nikitović signed an agreement with Energogas on the construction of a gas pipeline from Preljina to Užice. Under the terms of the agreement, the municipality was to finance forty-five per cent of the construction and mechanical works.

The Democratic Opposition of Serbia (DOS), a new alliance of parties opposed to Slobodan Milošević's continued rule, was formed in 2000; the SPO was not included in the alliance. DOS candidate Vojislav Koštunica defeated Milošević in the 2000 Yugoslavian presidential election, and Milošević subsequently fell from power on 5 October 2000. In the concurrent Yugoslavian parliamentary election, Nikitović appeared in the twelfth position on the SPO's list for the upper house, the Chamber of Republics. The SPO won only one seat in this body, which was automatically assigned to its lead candidate, the architect Spasoje Krunić.

The DOS also won a majority victory in Užice in the 2000 Serbian local elections, which took place concurrently with the federal vote. Nikitović was personally defeated in his bid for re-election to the city assembly, and his mayoral term ended when the new assembly convened in October.

Serbia's government also fell after Milošević's defeat in the Yugoslavian election, and a new Serbian parliamentary election was held in December 2000. Prior to the vote, Serbia's electoral laws were reformed such that the entire country became a single at-large electoral district and all mandates were awarded to candidates on successful lists at the discretion of the sponsoring parties or coalitions, irrespective of numerical order. Nikitović appeared in the 125th position on the SPO's electoral list. The list did not cross the electoral threshold for assembly representation, and his parliamentary term ended when the new assembly convened in January 2001.

== Death ==
Nikitović died unexpectedly in Užice later in 2001.

== Electoral record ==
=== Local (Užice) ===
2009 Užice local election: Division 40 (Rosulje 5)
| Candidate | Party | Votes | % |
|---|---|---|---|
| Zoran Đikanović | Democratic Opposition of Serbia–Dr. Vojislav Koštunica | | elected |
| Milovan Ćorović | Socialist Party of Serbia–Yugoslav Left–Slobodan Milošević (Affiliation: Socialist Party of Serbia) | | defeated |
| Milan Nikitović (incumbent) | Serbian Renewal Movement | | defeated |
| Goran Stanić | Serbian Radical Party | | defeated |
| Total | | | |
Source: Ćorović, Nikitović, and Stanić are listed alphabetically.
