= Prvi Partizan =

Serbian defense company

Coordinates: 43°51′05″N 19°51′16″E

- Native name: Први партизан Prvi partizan
- Type: Joint-stock company
- Industry: Ammunition
- Founded: 8 May 1998; 28 years ago (Current form); 1 May 1928; 98 years ago (Originally founded)
- Founder: Jakob Posinger
- Headquarters: Užice, Serbia
- Area served: Worldwide
- Key people: Dobrosav Andrić (General director)
- Products: Ammunition, handloading equipment and supplies
- Revenue: ▲€75.38 million (2018)
- Net income: ▼€1.71 million (2018)
- Total assets: ▲€123.53 million (2018)
- Total equity: ▲€78.47 million (2018)
- Owner: Government of Serbia (87.5%); Development Fund (12.4%)
- Number of employees: 1,596 (2018)
- Website: prvipartizan.com

Prvi partizan (Serbian: Први партизан, romanized: Prvi partizan; abbr. PPU) is a Serbian manufacturer of ammunition and handloading components.

The company produces ammunition for civilian and military consumers in a variety of calibers in various loadings. Prvi partizan is one of the few sources of certain unusual cartridges, such as the 8x56mmR used in the M95/30 variant of the Mannlicher M1895, the 7.92×33mm Kurz cartridge used in the StG 44 rifle, and the 7.65×53mm Argentine cartridge. In 2009, the company began manufacturing 8mm Lebel ammunition, becoming the first commercial manufacturer in decades to produce it.

== History ==
The company was founded in 1928 under the name FOMU - Fabrika Oružja i Municije Užice ("Weapons and Munitions Factory in Užice).

During World War II the decentralized resistance-run ammunition works run by Tito's partisans was named Prvi Partizan fabrika ("First Partisan factory"). This name was retained after the war when it was moved back to the FOMU facility in Užice.

According to the global trade data company Panjiva, Prvi partizan was listed as the third biggest foreign ammunition supplier in the United States market for 2016. The Government of Serbia invested 4 million euros for the new hall construction in 2017.

== Incidents ==
On 3 September 2009, seven employees died and 15 others had minor injuries after four explosions occurred in the gunpowder area.

== Headstamp ==
Prvi partizan cartridges carry the headstamp "ППУ" ("PPU"), which stands as abbreviation of the company's name in Cyrillic letters, "Први партизан Ужице" ("Prvi partizan Užice"). Prvi Partizan has made ammunition with the headstamps PP and PPU.

== See also ==
- Defense industry of Serbia
