= Mannlicher M1890 carbine =

Repeating carbine model 1890
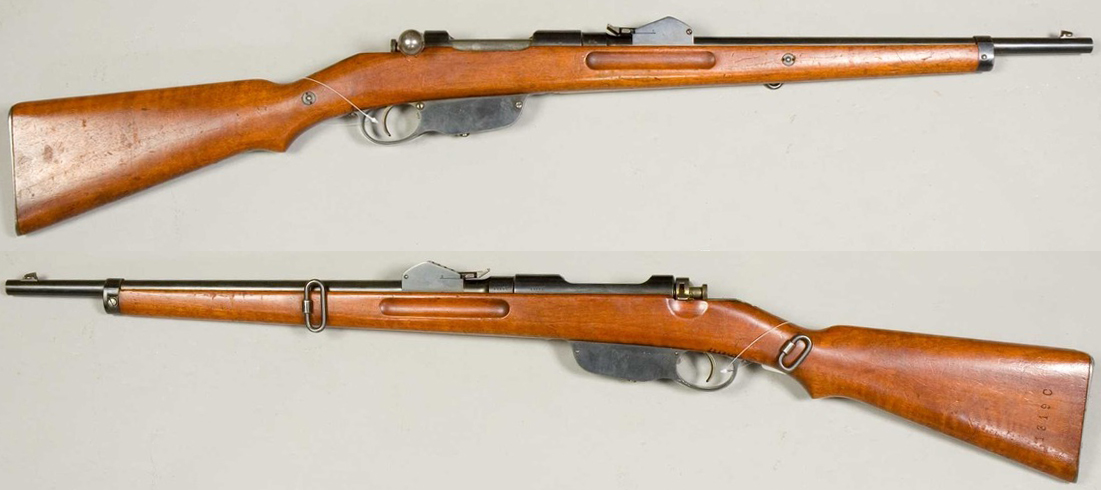
- Model 1890 cavalry carbine, from the collections of the Swedish Army Museum
- Type: Bolt action rifle
- Place of origin: Austria-Hungary

Service history
- In service: 1890–1918 (Austria-Hungary)
- Used by: See users
- Wars: Balkan Wars; World War I World War II

Production history
- Designer: Ferdinand Mannlicher
- Designed: 1890?
- Manufacturer: Österreichische Waffenfabriksgesellschaft
- Produced: 1891–1896
- No. built: 115,218
- Variants: Cavalry carbine, Gendarmerie carbine and Navy short rifle

Specifications
- Mass: 3.3 kilograms (7.3 lb)
- Length: 1,005 millimetres (39.6 in)
- Barrel length: 498 millimetres (19.6 in)
- Cartridge: M90: 8×50mmR Mannlicher; M90/24:8×57mm IS; M90/30, M90/31: 8×56mmR
- Action: Straight-pull bolt action
- Muzzle velocity: 620 m/s (2,034 ft/s) with M1893 ball cartridge
- Feed system: 5-round en bloc clip, integral box magazine
- Sights: Iron sights

The repeating carbine model 1890 a.k.a. Mannlicher model 1890 carbine is a bolt-action rifle, designed by Ferdinand Mannlicher that used a new version of his straight-pull action bolt. It was introduced as an alternative to the Mannlicher M1888 as it was shorter and easier to maneuver with. Three main versions were introduced: Cavalry Carbine, Gendarmerie Carbine and Navy Short Rifle.

== Variants ==
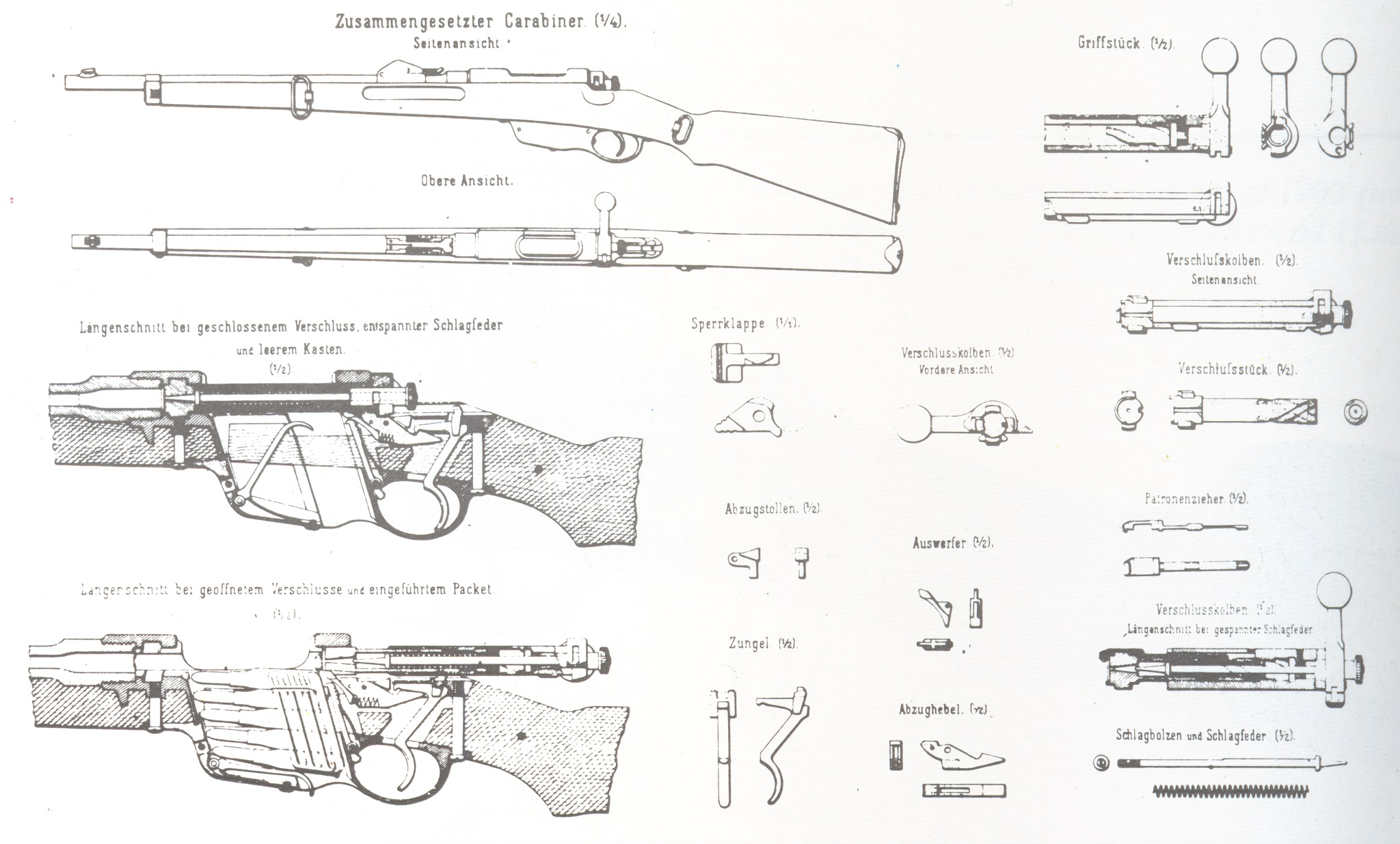
Detailed parts drawing

=== Cavalry carbine ===
This variant was used by the Austro-Hungarian cavalry. A stacking rod, handguard and bayonet lug are absent.

=== Stutzen ===
This variant features sling swivels on the underside, a stacking rod and bayonet lugs. It was used by the Austro-Hungarian Navy.

=== Gendarmerie carbine ===
The Austro-Hungarian Gendarmarie was also in need of a carbine. It adopted a version which featured a bayonet lug but no stacking rod.

=== Conversions ===
M90/30 was a conversion of these rifles done in the First Austrian Republic. They carry the letter S stamped on the barrel.

M90/31 was a conversion of these rifles done in the Kingdom of Hungary. They carry the letter H stamped on the barrel.

M90/95 was a conversion of these rifles done in Ethiopian Empire. Unlike other conversions, these were done by putting existing M90 carbines in M95 pattern furniture.

== Afghan contract ==
A small number of these carbines made for the Afghan contract were ordered by Abdur Rahman Khan for the Emirate of Afghanistan.

== Users ==
- Afghanistan
- Austria-Hungary
- Austria
- Bulgaria
- Ethiopia
- Hungary
- Siam
