= 8×56mmR =

Austrian rifle cartridge

8×56mmR Steyr / Hungarian
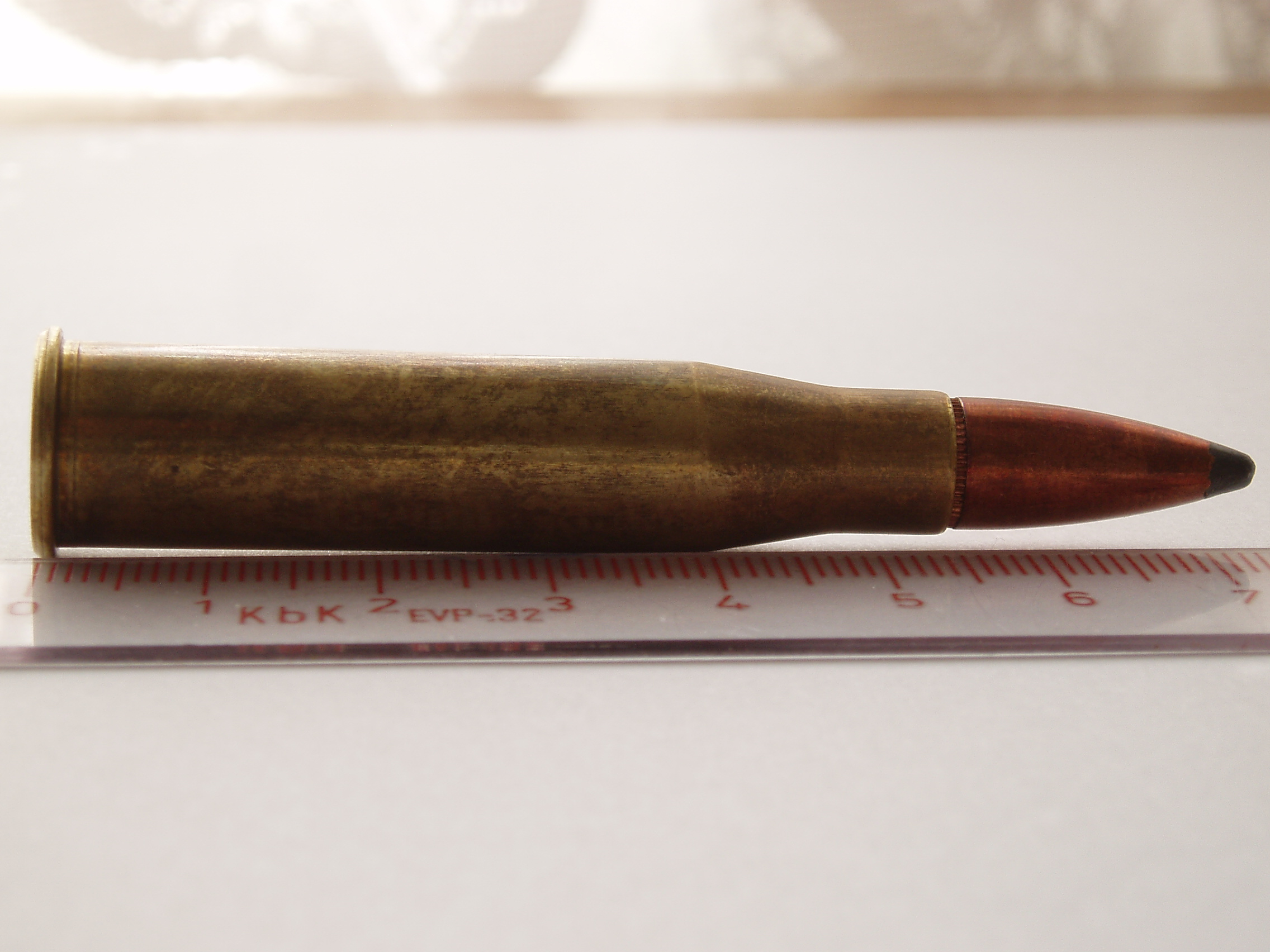
- Commercial cartridge with a soft-point bullet.
- Type: Rifle
- Place of origin: Austria

Service history
- In service: 1930–1945
- Used by: First Austrian Republic; Kingdom of Hungary; Nazi Germany; Kingdom of Bulgaria
- Wars: Slovak–Hungarian War; World War II; Hungarian Revolution of 1956

Production history
- Designed: 1930
- Produced: 1930–present (commercial)

Specifications
- Parent case: 8×50mmR Mannlicher
- Case type: Rimmed, bottleneck
- Bullet diameter: 8.35 mm (0.329 in)
- Land diameter: 7.95 mm (0.313 in)
- Neck diameter: 9.20 mm (0.362 in)
- Shoulder diameter: 12.00 mm (0.472 in)
- Base diameter: 12.47 mm (0.491 in)
- Rim diameter: 14.05 mm (0.553 in)
- Rim thickness: 1.37 mm (0.054 in)
- Case length: 55.63 mm (2.190 in)
- Overall length: 75.91 mm (2.989 in)
- Case capacity: 3.861 cm^{3} (59.58 gr H_{2}O)
- Rifling twist: 255 mm (1 in 10 in)
- Primer type: Berdan or Boxer Large Rifle
- Maximum pressure: 355 MPa (51,500 psi)

Ballistic performance
Bullet mass/type	Velocity	Energy
206 gr (13 g) M30	701 m/s (2,300 ft/s)	3,280 J (2,420 ft⋅lbf)
200 gr (13 g) 200 Grain Jacketed	622 m/s (2,040 ft/s)	2,507 J (1,849 ft⋅lbf)

The 8×56mmR or 8×56mmR M30S (C.I.P. civil designation) cartridge was adopted in the year 1930 by First Austrian Republic, in 1931 by the Kingdom of Hungary, and in 1934 by the Kingdom of Bulgaria as a replacement for the 8×50mmR Mannlicher cartridge.

== History ==
It was originally created to improve and update the Steyr Mannlicher M1895 rifles, adopted for use in rifles in 1931 with Hungary as the M31 to replace the 8×50mmR Mannlicher cartridge and with Austria in 1930. The updated cartridge coincided with an update to the Steyr-Mannlicher M1895 rifle in which the barrel length was reduced and the chamber re-cut to accept the new cartridge, and was the cartridge chosen by Hungary for the 35M rifle as a replacement for the Mannlicher M1895. The 8×56mmR was also used in updated versions of Austrian and Hungarian machine guns such as the Solothurn 31M and Schwarzlose 07/31M. From 1934 on it was the standard military cartridge of Kingdom of Bulgaria.

This ammunition was made at a variety of plants as well as countries, including Austria, Germany, Bulgaria and Czechoslovakia.

== Current production ==
The 8×56mmR is currently produced by Hornady and Prvi Partizan for commercial sales. It is no longer in use by any organized military forces. While many Stutzen Model 1895/30 were brought into the United States and sold at retailers such as Big-5, the price of the round still remains much higher than most other surplus rifle rounds such as 7.62×54mmR and .30-06 (7.62×63mm), making 8×56mmR very uneconomical to shoot for the average shooter.

== Handloading ==
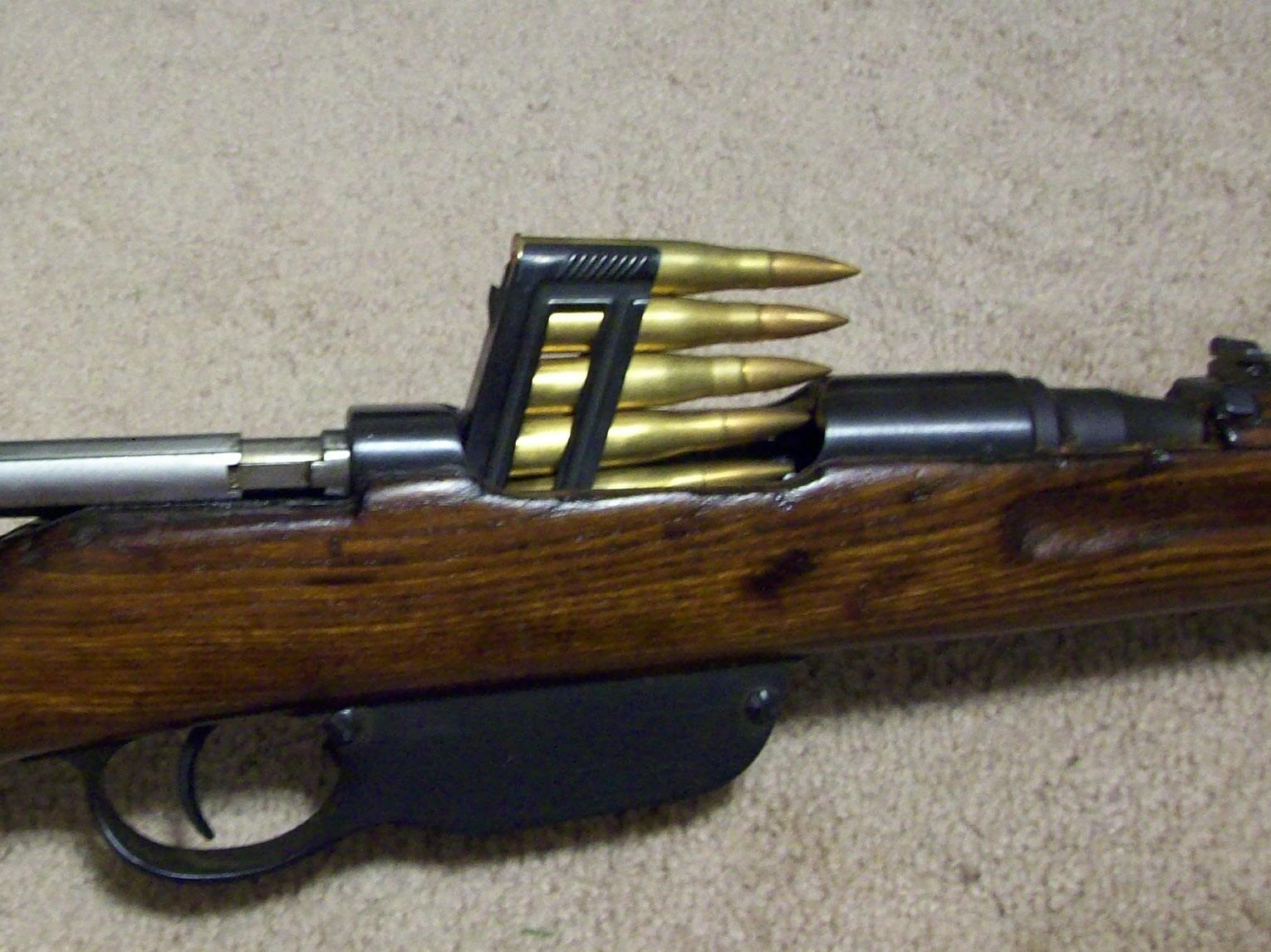
8×56mmR being loaded into a Mannlicher M1895/30 rifle via an en bloc clip.

Reloading the 8×56mmR Mannlicher can be problematic, due to the .329" groove diameter of the barrel. Commonly available .323" 8mm "S"-bullets will produce very poor accuracy. Open-base jacketed bullets, such as the .323" 244 grain round-nose FMJ bullets used in the 8×50mmR Mannlicher, will often produce better results but are difficult to obtain. However, the reloading situation for this cartridge has improved significantly in the last few years, and Hornady now manufactures a .330 bullet made explicitly for the 8×56R cartridge.

Some manufacturers like Haendler & Naterman (Germany; 190 grains) or Degol (Belgium) still produce various bullets for sporting or hunting purposes. Prvi Partizan produces a FMJ .330 Boat tail bullet under the number B-384 and a Soft Point bullet number B-561, both 208 Grains.

Lee Precision, Inc. can make a bullet-sizing die in .330", allowing .338" bullets to be swaged down to this caliber. Bullets in the 200 to 225 grain weight class would work best. Lyman and LEE Precision Inc. both offer cast bullet molds in this caliber. Corbins offers swaging dies for their bullet swaging-presses to make various bullets from raw materials.

Reloadable cartridge cases can be produced by resizing 7.62×54mmR Mosin–Nagant Russian brass. This results in a case neck 2mm short, but no problems arise from this, as the cartridge will still headspace correctly on its rim. The remaining case neck is also still sufficient to hold the bullet firmly. RCBS produces a reforming die. 8×56mmR Mannlicher brass for handloading is produced by Prvi Partizan, although availability is irregular.

Chargers or clips for the M.95 (and earlier 8×50mmR and 8×56mmR Mannlicher rifles) are available from surplus arms and ammunition dealers such as Sarco.

Reloading dies are made by Hornady, RCBS, Redding, and Lee.

== Weapons chambered in 8x56mmR ==
- Mannlicher 1895/30
- Mannlicher 1890/30
- 31.M
- 90/31.M
- 35M Rifle
- Mannlicher 88/18
- Steyr-Solothurn S2-200
- Schwarzlose MG
- ZB 39

== See also ==
- List of rimmed cartridges
