= List of blow-forward firearms =

Below is the list of blow-forward weapons

Name	Manufacturer	Image	Cartridge	Type	Country	Year	Reference
Steyr Mannlicher M1894	FAB. D'Armes		7.63 mm Mannlicher; 7.65×21mm Mannlicher; 7.65×21mm Parabellum	Semi-automatic pistol	Austria-Hungary	1894	
Schwarzlose Model 1908			7.65mm Browning	Semi-automatic pistol	German Empire	1908	
Hino Komuro M1908 Pistol	Komuro Juhou Seisakusho		.25 ACP.32 ACP; 8×22mm Nambu	Semi-automatic pistol	Empire of Japan	1903	
Pancor Jackhammer	Pancor Corporation		12 gauge	Bullpup automatic shotgun	United States	1984	
Mk 20 Mod 0 grenade launcher	NOS Louisville		40x46mm SR	Automatic grenade launcher	United States	c. 1965	
Howa Type 96	Howa		40x56mm	Automatic grenade launcher	Japan	1996	
HIW VSK	Hessische Industrie Werke		8×33 Polte	Bolt action carbine	Nazi Germany	1944	
