= Iga =

Iga may refer to:

== Arts and entertainment ==
- Ambush at Iga Pass, a 1958 Japanese film
- Iga no Kagemaru, Japanese manga series
- Iga, a set of characters from the Japanese novel The Kouga Ninja Scrolls

== Biology ==
- Iga (beetle), a genus of beetle in the family Carabidae
- IgA, Immunoglobulin A, an antibody
- Iga, or iga warta, Adnyamathanha name for Capparis mitchellii, the Australian native orange

== Cuisine ==
- Iga babi, Indonesian pork rib dish from Bali
- Iga penyet, Indonesian fried beef spare ribs dish from Java

== People ==
=== Japan ===
- Iga Mori (毛利伊賀; 1864-1951), a Japanese physician who also practised in Hawaii
- Koji Igarashi (五十嵐 孝司; born 1968, nicknamed "Iga"), a Japanese video game producer, known for his involvement with the Castlevania series
- Ujihiro Iga (伊賀氏広; 1886-1966) Japanese aerospace pioneer
- Yuji Iga (伊賀 裕治; born 1965), a Japanese professional ice hockey player

=== Poland ===
- Iga Baumgart-Witan (born 1989), a Polish sprinter
- Iga Cembrzyńska (born 1939), a Polish actress
- Iga Świątek (born 2001), a Polish tennis player
- Iga Wyrwał (born 1989; also known as Eva or Eve), a Polish glamour model
- Jadwiga (diminutive "Iga"), a Polish female given name

=== Other ===
- Ayesha Leti-I'iga, New Zealand rugby union player
- Christopher Iga, Ugandan politician

== Places ==
=== Japan ===
- Iga Province, an old province in the area that is today western Mie Prefecture, Japan
  - Iga ikki, the confederacy of ninja families that controlled the province from the 1460s until 1581
  - Tenshō Iga War, the name of two historical invasions of the province, the second of which ended the Iga ikki
- Iga, Mie, a city in Mie Prefecture, Honshū island, Japan
  - Iga Kokubun-ji, a buddhist temple
  - Iga Kokuchō ruins, an archaeological site
  - Iga Ueno Ninja Festa, annual five-week ninja-themed festival
  - Iga ware, style of traditional Japanese pottery from Iga area
  - Iga Ueno Castle, a fortification in the centre of town and site of the former headquarters of the Iga ikki
- Iga-ryū (literally “the Iga School”), a school of ninjutsu in Japan

=== Elsewhere ===
- Iga Idunganran, the official residence of the Oba (king) of Lagos, Nigeria
- Iga Vas, a village in Slovenia

== Transport ==
- Iga-Kōzu Station, a railway station on the Osaka line in the city of Iga, Mie prefecture, Japan
- Iga Railway Line, in the city of Iga, Mie prefecture, Japan
  - Iga-Kambe Station, a railway station on the other end of Iga line
  - Iga-Ueno Station, a railway terminus station on the Iga line
- Iga Station, a railway station on the Kashii Line in Kasuya, Fukuoka prefecture, Japan

== Other uses ==
- IGA, Inc., an international affiliation of franchised grocery stores based in the United States
- 1854 Iga–Ueno earthquake, a deadly tremor in the Kansai region of Japan with the epicentre near Iga town
- 8300 Iga (previously 1994 AO2), a main-belt asteroid
- Tanaka-Iga, a Japanese company producing Buddhist goods
- IGA (disambiguation)
