= Mannlicher =

Mannlicher may refer to:

- Ferdinand Mannlicher (1848–1904), Austrian engineer and small arms designer, including a list of firearms named after Ferdinand Mannlicher
- Steyr Arms, formerly Steyr Mannlicher, an Austrian firearms manufacturer, owner of the trade mark Mannlicher
