= Mannlicher M1905 =

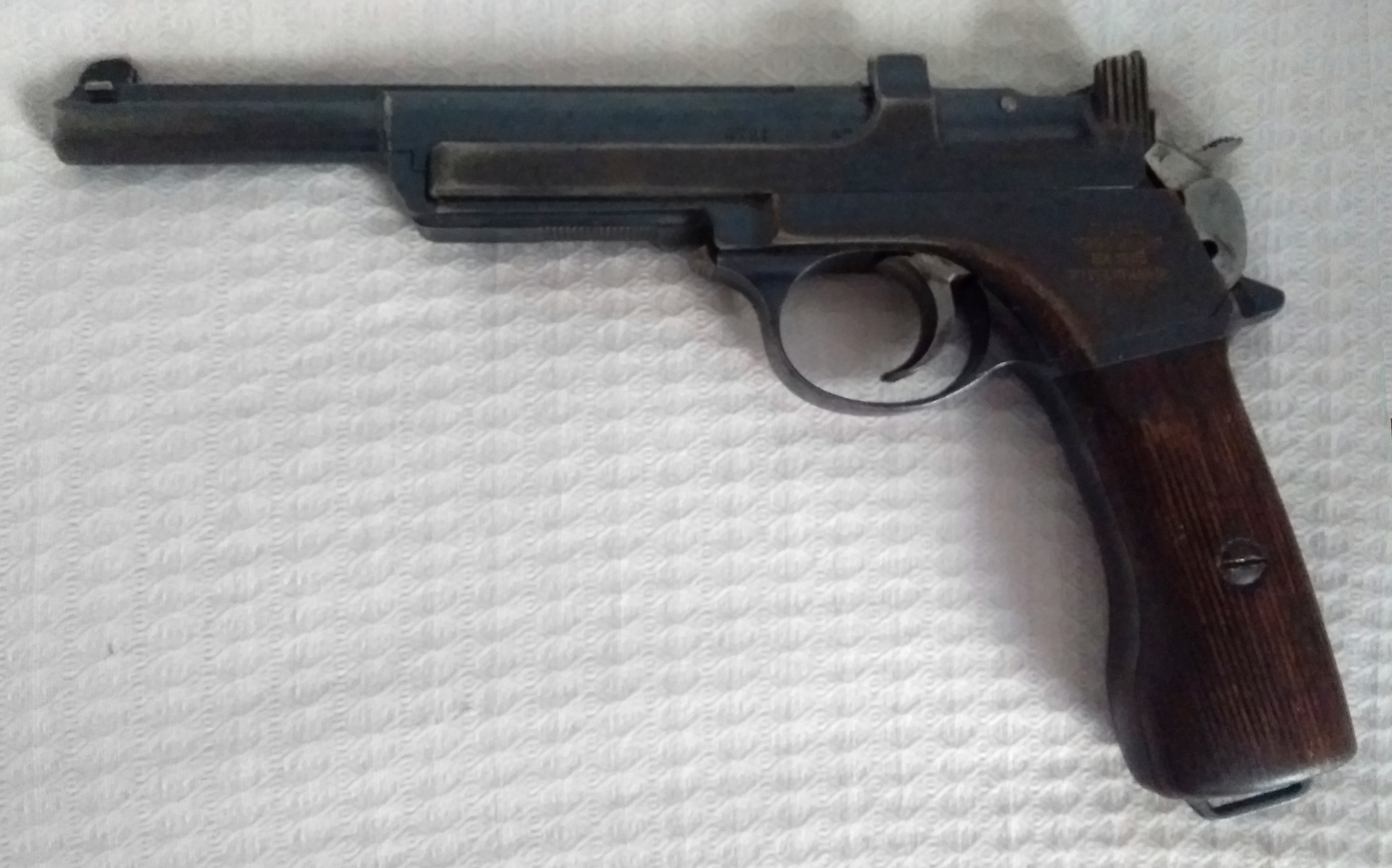
- Type: Semi-automatic pistol
- Place of origin: Austria-Hungary

Service history
- Used by: Argentina; Austria-Hungary (limited); Ottoman Empire; Paraguay
- Wars: World War I (limited); Chaco War

Production history
- Designer: Ferdinand Mannlicher
- Designed: 1905
- Manufacturer: Œ.W.G.
- Produced: 1905–1910
- No. built: Approximately 11,000 or more

Specifications
- Mass: 910 g (32 oz) empty
- Length: 246 mm (9.7 in)
- Barrel length: 160 mm (6.3 in)
- Cartridge: 7.63mm Mannlicher
- Action: Delayed blowback
- Feed system: 10-round stripper clip-loaded magazine
- Sights: Iron sights

The Modelo 1905 was an Argentine variant of the Mannlicher Model 1901 semi-automatic pistol, designed by Ferdinand Ritter von Mannlicher and manufactured by Österreichische Waffenfabriks-Gesellschaft (Œ.W.G.) in Austria-Hungary. The Argentine Army purchased the pistol from Steyr in 1905, giving the model its designation. It was one of a series of Mannlicher self-loading pistols developed from the Model 1900.

The Modelo 1905 retained the basic design of the earlier Mannlicher pistols, including a fixed magazine loaded from the top with a stripper clip. It was a single-action pistol using a blowback operating system. The model is also distinguished by the curved shape of its grip, which became a characteristic feature of the Mannlicher pistol designs of the period.

== Operation ==
The Mannlicher 1900, 1901 and the Modelo 1905 all use the same blowback operating system. Fowler, North, and Stronge describe blowback-operated weapons as using the pressure from the spent round to push a bolt that is located behind the round back and forth against a spring. The pressure forces the slide back against the spring and ejects the spent cartridge. Then, a new round enters the chamber and the compressed spring pushes the bolt forward again, loading the bullet into the breech, leaving the gun ready to fire again.

According to Fowler, North and Stronge, it is a delayed blowback operation, using a large external hammer and heavy spring. This operation is carried out by the unique design of the slide, which includes the extractor and the firing pin. Since the pistol is single action, the hammer needs to be cocked before it can fire a round. This is accomplished by the slide as it is pushed back from the gasses, which are expelled out of the cartridge once it is fired. Finally, as the slide moves back to the forward position, it chambers a new round.

The reason why this operation system is able to work is because the Modelo 1905 has an open top design and the barrel was screwed into the breech. Borallo furthers this explanation by stating that "the design was simple: it had a fixed barrel and the triggering mechanism was installed on the sides of the frame and the recoil spring was located below the barrel". Fowler, North, and Stronge North describe this as "a mechanism which has been likened to that of a fine watch". There are very few moving parts, and all of them are located outside of the integral magazine in a small mainspring housing.

These parts consist of a cam, mainspring, hammer, recoil spring, and the trigger group. It can also be noted that the hammer is designed at close to a forty-five-degree angle, whereas most handguns have a hammer that is made at about a ninety degree angle. This distinctive characteristic is due to the fact that the moving parts are in the mainspring housing which is located just underneath the slide instead of in the handle. This design also is key to the safety mechanisms of the pistol, which consists of a manual safety catch lever on the right side of the slide that stands in the way of the hammer hitting the firing pin.

== 7.63mm cartridge ==
When the Model 1900 was originally produced, it was chambered in an 8mm cartridge; however, in 1901, Mannlicher reintroduced it with the 7.65 × 21 mm Mannlicher cartridge to make it more powerful. In order to distinguish this round from the 7.63×25 mm Mauser round, it was referred to in Germany as the 7.65 round, or the 7.63 × 21. This cartridge has a straight case and contains an 82-grain (5.3 g) bullet that is propelled by 3.2 grains (210 mg) of smokeless powder. This equates to a muzzle velocity of about 1,000 feet per second (300 m/s), and 193 foot-pounds (262 J) of muzzle energy. The cartridges are loaded into the pistol using a stripper clip, which holds ten rounds. The rims of the cartridges fit into the groove of the stripper clip and allow the cartridges to slide onto it and stay in place until they are ready to be loaded into the breech. The end of the stripper clip is placed above the open breech, and then the cartridges can simply be pushed down so that they slide off the stripper clip and into the breech. The production of this cartridge mostly stopped in Europe with the end of the second world war, and continued to be produced in Argentina until 1958, but may still continue today.

There has been successful attempts on recreating the cartridge by Rakum Projects using the following components:

Brass: 30 Super Carry

Primer: Remington brand small bore pistol primers (due to them being softest on market)

Powder: not brand specific (use 7.65 Browning/32ACP loading data)

Bullet: 85 grain 7.62 Tokarev (round nose)

== Testing ==
In the years prior to production, the Modelo 1905 pistol was tested multiple times in Europe alongside various other handguns. In late 1898, a board of army officers held a test in Bern, Switzerland between multiple pistols. These pistols included the six shot capacity and 10 shot capacity Mauser C96, the Bergmann 1894, the Borchardt-Luger, the Roth-Theodorovic pistol, and the Mannlicher. The pistols were put through several tests, including assembly, explanation, firing 50 rounds, target shooting, timing while firing, and an endurance test in which the pistol must fire 400 rounds without being cleaned or allowed to cool. The Borchardt-Luger was the only pistol to pass the endurance test. Next, the pistols performed firing 20 rounds after dust and water tests, and the Borchardt-Luger was again, the only one to pass it without any malfunctions. A second test was held a year later, with the pistols being modified to the board's specifications. The Luger was modified to be much lighter and accurate for these tests that followed. As a result, the Luger became an instant success and the Swiss were the first to adopt it, and its popularity soared from there. The fact that the Modelo 1905 was not comparatively effective in testing against other pistols at the time is likely what led to its declined use in Europe.

== Service ==
The Argentine army adopted the Modelo 1905 in 1905 and continued to purchase it long after it had been discontinued in Europe. It was noted by the Argentine emblem engraved on the right side of the pistol, between the slide and the handgrip. On 15 March 1905, the Argentine Republic bought 1,020 Modelo 1905 pistols along with the necessary accessories (Holsters and stripper clips) and 1,019,700 rounds of ammunition. Almost three years later, they purchased 5,000 more Modelo 1905 pistols, and 3,000,000 rounds of ammunition. Ultimately, a total of around 10,000 of these pistols were acquired by the Argentine armed forces. According to Fowler, North and Stronge, "During the twentieth century technological improvements in weapon design meant that they more reliable, faster, and more deadly". Although it is not completely certain, Argentina perhaps had more of a use for the Modelo 1905 than Europe because at the time, Germany had already developed the Luger 1900 and was in the process of developing the Luger P08, which became "perhaps one of the most recognizable semi-automatic pistols in history". Both of these pistols were relatively similar in design to the Modelo 1905, except for the operation of the toggle slide, and that both Lugers had a detachable magazine. This made the Luger a more combat ready pistol and allowed for much faster reloads along with less chance of dirt getting into the chamber.

The M1905 was also sold to Paraguay, which used it during the Chaco War.
