= Mannlicher M1901 =

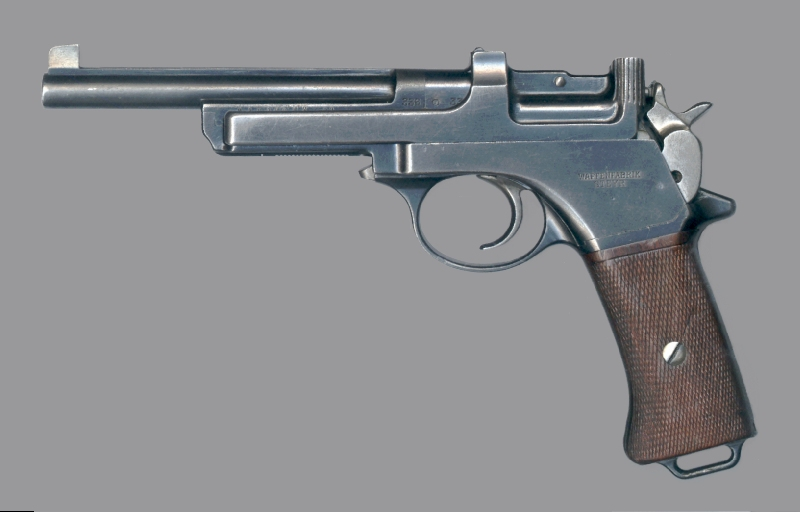
- Type: Semi-automatic pistol
- Place of origin: Austria-Hungary

Service history
- Used by: See Users
- Wars: World War I

Production history
- Designer: Ferdinand Mannlicher
- Designed: 1901
- Manufacturer: Œ.W.G.
- Produced: 1901–1903
- No. built: 4,000
- Variants: Mannlicher M1905

Specifications
- Cartridge: 7.63mm Mannlicher
- Action: Delayed blowback
- Muzzle velocity: 326 m/s (1,070 ft/s)
- Feed system: 8-round stripper clip into magazine
- Sights: Iron sights

The Mannlicher M1901 was an early semi-automatic pistol designed by Austrian engineer Ferdinand Mannlicher. It was developed in Austria-Hungary in the early 20th century and manufactured by Österreichische Waffenfabriks-Gesellschaft (Œ.W.G.) in Steyr. The M1901 was one of Mannlicher's early self-loading pistol designs and was produced in limited numbers.

The M1901 formed part of Mannlicher's continuing development of self-loading pistols. It used a delayed-blowback operating system and was chambered for the 7.63mm Mannlicher cartridge. Approximately 4,000 examples were produced between 1901 and 1903. A specimen is preserved in the collection of the Bundeswehr Museum of German Defense Technology in Koblenz, Germany.

== General features ==
This pistol is one of the most simple of blow-back semi-automatic pistols ever designed. The lockwork is essentially that of an elementary single action revolver. While technically listed as a 'hesitation' lock because of a delaying cam which has some theoretical tendency to slow down the opening of the breech, in actual practice it functions as an unlocked pistol.

According to the Steyr factory records this arm, patented in 1898, was originally introduced as the "Model 1900" and used a special 8 mm cartridge.

When introduced commercially in 1901 it was chambered for a special straight-case cartridge listed in Austria as "7.63 mm Mannlicher", designated in Germany as "7.65mm Mannlicher" (Note: There is also another 7.65 mm Mannlincher cartridge, M.1903, similar to 7.65 mm Borchardt), and described in the U.S. as "7.65 x 21 mm". The Mannlicher "straight sided" cartridge actually has a straight taper to help in extraction.

The cartridge for this pistol was manufactured in Europe until the beginning of WWII. The cartridge has a bullet weighing approx. 85 grains (5.5 g) which may be steel or cupro-nickel jacketed. The powder charge varies with the type of powder used, the European standard being about 3.5 grains (227 mg) of DWM standard powder, producing a muzzle velocity in the neighborhood of 1070 ft/s (326 m/s).

The firing chamber in this design is part of the receiver proper. The fixed magazine is housed in the grip, and is loaded with a stripper clip through the top of the open action. Because of the extremely simple lock work employed, the pistol has a minimum bulk for an arm of its type.

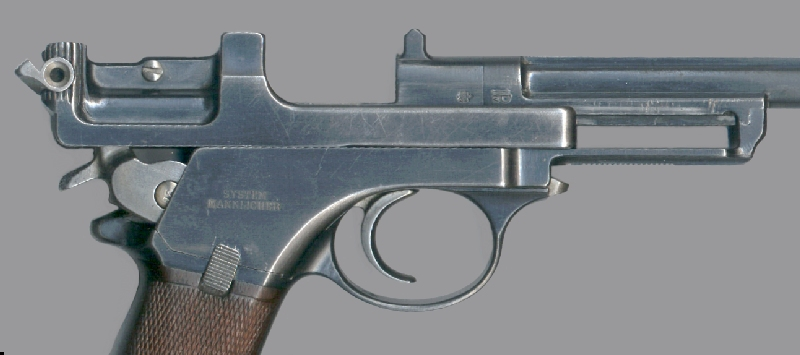

== Breechblock design ==
The moving breechblock of this pistol was designed as a slide with two rails extending forward beneath the stationary receiver/barrel where they are connected by a cross beam which is also part of the single breechblock forging. The barrel is screwed into the chamber section of the receiver and has a front sight top rib which is part of the barrel forging.

A spiral recoil spring is positioned horizontally, directly below the barrel between the parallel guides of the receiver and rails of the breechblock. An illustration of this spring is shown in the drawing from page 216, Mannlicher Rifles and Pistols, Smith, 1947. When the pistol is discharged, as the breechblock moves to the rear and the slide rails travel back in the receiver guides, the cross-beam at the forward end serves to compress the recoil spring against the frame.

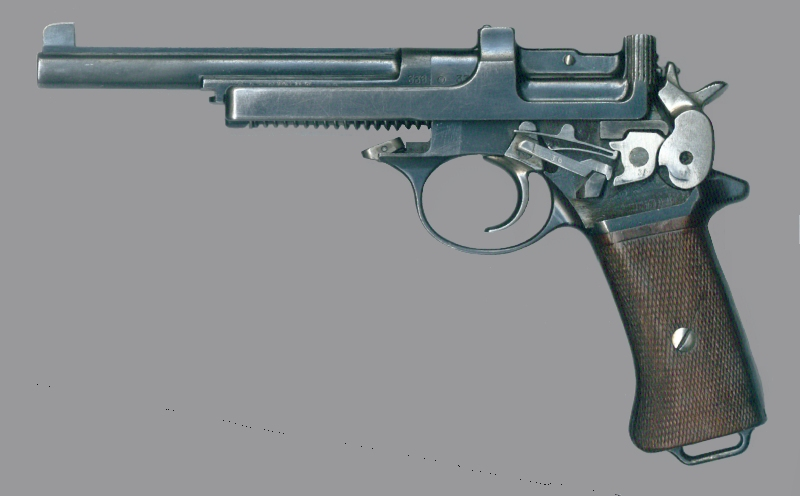

The lockwork is incorporated on the left side of the frame where it is covered by a removable side cover housing of unusual design, being wrapped around at the forward end and serving also as a cover of the recoil spring. An illustration of this cover is shown in the below drawing from page 218 of the same work. This cover is installed on the frame from the front, and is retained by a spring catch forward of the trigger-guard.

The trigger is connected on the left side of the frame to a trigger bar, which, as the trigger is pulled, moves rearward, pushing against the sear tail, which is under the control of the V-spring that serves as both trigger spring and sear spring. The sear nose engages in a notch in the left fork of the hammer (which is external) to provide a smooth trigger pull that is very unusual in an automatic pistol.

Mounted on the frame under the right portion of the side cover housing is the mainspring, a heavy V-spring. Its greater arm (lower) engages a notch in the right fork of the hammer to drive it forward when released by the sear. Its lesser arm (upper) continuously presses a cam upward that engages a slot in the under-surface of the breechblock slide when the action is closed.

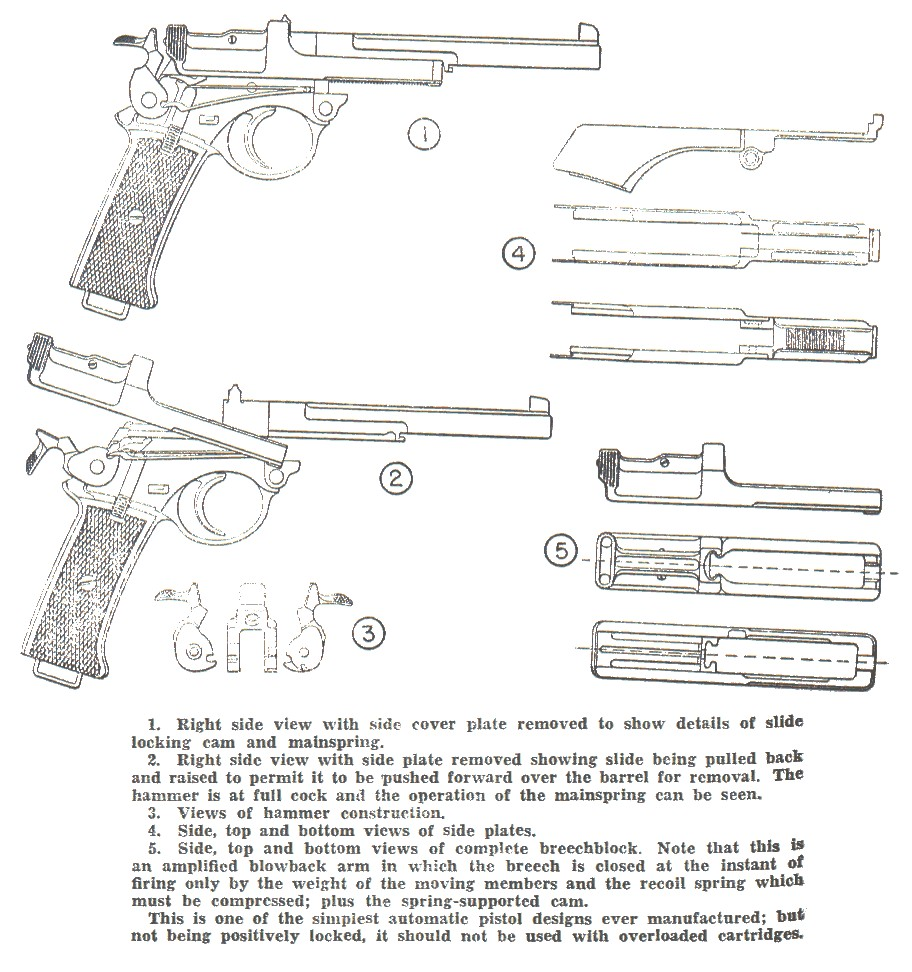

To load the pistol, the breechblock is grasped on the serrated gripping surfaces on the sides, and is pulled straight to the rear. The magazine follower rises to hold the action open, while the cross beam at the forward end of the slide compresses the recoil spring. A loaded stripper clip is inserted into the clip guide in the face of the breech block, and then the cartridges are stripped into the magazine, compressing the spring below the follower. An illustration of this process is shown in the drawing from page 214 of the above-mentioned work. The spring lip at the top of the magazine serves to hold the cartridges. The cam on the right side of the frame, being forced up by the lesser arm of the mainspring, pushes the cam into the slot in the under-surface of the breechblock slide, holding the action open.

Because of this cam hold-open, the pistol does not close when the clip is removed. However, drawing back slightly on the breechblock will ride it over the cam, and releasing it will permit the recoil spring to close the action.

As the breechblock goes forward, the extractor mounted in the top of the block will snap over the extracting groove of the cartridge as it is chambered.

== Discharging ==
Movement of the trigger, linked to the trigger bar, releases the sear from the hammer notch. The compressed arm of the mainspring pushes against the hammer notch, rotating the hammer on its axis to strike the firing pin, discharging the cartridge.

The breechblock starts back at the instant of discharge, carrying the empty cartridge case with the assistance of the extractor. The empty cartridge case is brought sharply against the ejector, which is a bar at the back of the magazine. The underside of the breechblock is slotted to travel over the ejector.

The recoiling slide riding over the hammer causes the hammer to rotate on its axis, locking the sear in the notch of the left hammer fork.

The magazine spring forces the next cartridge up into line. At the apex of the recoil stroke, the recoil spring acts to reverse the direction of the breechblock, chambering the fresh cartridge. Until trigger pressure is released, another discharge is not possible.

== Magazine unload lever ==
A unique feature of this pistol is the unloading device. While the breechblock is held open, pulling down on the serrated lever on the right side at the top of the grip panel will withdraw the lip which is holding the cartridges in the magazine, enabling the magazine spring to move the platform up, forcing all the cartridges out of the magazine.

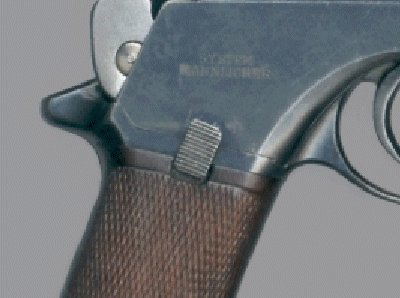

== Developmental versions ==
After the disappointing reception of the Mannlicher M1894, the more conventional Mannlicher M1896 appeared, externally resembling the Mauser C96. The M1896 had a fixed magazine ahead of the trigger holding six or seven cartridges. However, most production of this design was an improved M1897/01 which used a detachable six-shot magazine in the same location. Both the M1896 and M1897/01 were chambered for the 7.65×25mm Mannlicher, and both could be fed from the top with a stripper clip. Fewer than 1,000 M1896s and M1897/01s were manufactured, in several variations including a detachable shoulder stock model, a carbine version, and a trial model tested by the Swiss military.

The Mannlicher M1898 was a complete redesign, moving the magazine back, into the location of the later M1901, for loading from an 8-round stripper clip. The M1899 had a large safety lever mounted on the left side of the frame. Embellished pistols were presented to German Emperor Kaiser Wilhelm, and to Ottoman Sultan Abdul Hamid II, but production of the M1898 and M1899 was less than 350, following which the design was improved to the M1901, with its slide-mounted, hammer-blocking safety, and convenient lever lock for easier disassembly.

== Users ==
- Argentina — Used as the Modelo 1905.
- Austria-Hungary — Privately purchased by some officers of the Austro-Hungarian Army; it was not officially adopted following military trials in 1904–1905.

== See also ==
- Steyr Mannlicher M1894
- Roth-Steyr M1907
- Steyr M1912
- Mannlicher M1905
