= IGA =

IGA or IgA may refer to:

== Businesses and organizations ==
- Identity Governance and Administration, the organizational policies, processes and procedures related to the oversight of identity and access management
- IGA, Inc. (initially Independent Grocers Alliance), a name used by many independent supermarkets throughout the world
- IGA Supermarkets, the local Australian variant of the international IGA
- Indian Gaming Association, a nonprofit organization for Native American gaming interests founded in 1986
- International Island Games Association, an organization that organizes the Island Games (a friendly competition between teams from several islands and other small territories)
- International Grenfell Association, an organization providing health care, education, religious and other services to the fishermen and coastal communities in Newfoundland and Labrador
- Interscope-Geffen-A&M, an American record label
- Irish Games Association, a non-profit body which is dedicated to promoting gaming in Ireland
- International Gay Association, the original name of the International Lesbian, Gay, Bisexual, Trans and Intersex Association

== In government ==
- Illinois General Assembly
- Indiana General Assembly
- Iowa General Assembly

== In military ==
- Imperial German Army

== In science and technology ==
- Immunoglobulin A (IgA), an antibody playing a critical role in mucosal immunity
- Intergranular attack, another term for intergranular corrosion (a form of corrosion where the boundaries of crystallites of the material are more susceptible to corrosion than their insides)

== Other uses ==
- Identity Governance and Administration, the organisational policies, processes and procedures controlling identity management
- In-game advertising, the use of computer and video games as a medium in which to deliver advertising
- International Gamers Award, an award for strategy board games and historical simulation games
- Islamic Golden Age, a period in the history of the Muslim world
- Koji Igarashi, a Japanese video game producer, nicknamed IGA
- Intergovernmental Agreement on Dry Ports

== See also ==
- Iga (disambiguation)
