= Ujihiro Iga =

Japanese aerospace pioneer

Ugihiro Iga
- 伊賀 氏広
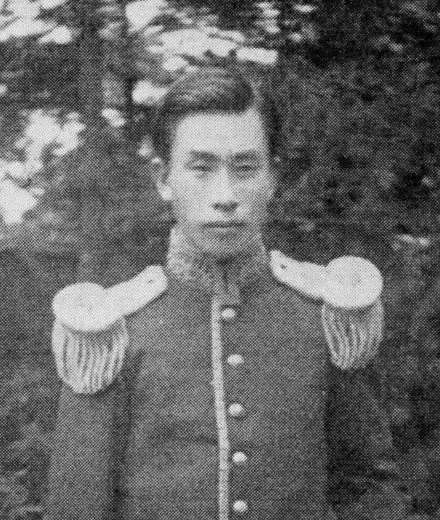
- Iga in October 1913
- Born: September 6, 1886; Kōchi, Kōchi, Japan
- Died: February 25, 1966 (aged 79); Sukumo, Kōchi, Japan
- Education: Tokyo School of Fine Arts
- Known for: Designing the first Japanese-produced aircraft

Ujihiro Iga (伊賀 氏広, Iga Ujihiro; September 6, 1886 – February 25, 1966) was an early pioneer in Japanese aviation. Born into the kazoku nobility, Iga gained an intense interest in aviation during his time in the Imperial Japanese Army. From 1910 to 1912, he engaged in intensive aviation research and ultimately produced two experimental designs. Though neither conducted a successful test flight, Iga's second aircraft, the "Dancing Crane," was the first aircraft to be produced entirely in Japan. Iga withdrew from aviation research in 1913, and spent the remainder of his life working in industrial management, promoting the modernization of firefighting, and researching Japanese Buddhism.

== Early life ==
Iga was born on September 8, 1886, in Kōchi, Kōchi prefecture, on the island of Shikoku. His biological father was Yamauchi Hōei, the younger brother of Yamauchi Yōdō, the last daimyo of Tosa domain. While Iga Ujihiro was still an infant, he was adopted into the Iga family as the son of Iga Yotarō, the former daimyo of Sukumo domain and last karō of Tosa domain. Following the death of his adopted father Youtarō in 1900, Iga inherited baronial status in the kazoku system.

Iga attended elementary school in his hometown of Sukumo, but received the rest of his primary and secondary education at the facilities attached to the Tokyo Normal School between 1899 and 1904. After finishing high school, Iga began university studies at the Tokyo University for the Arts. In 1907, three years into his university studies, Iga left to join a volunteer cavalry regiment. It was during this time in the army, while conducting training drills, that Iga first became interested in researching the use of aircraft for reconnaissance.

== Aviation Research ==
In December 1910, Kumazō Hino and Yoshitoshi Tokugawa conducted the first airplane flight in Japanese history. However, the aircraft that these two men used was a foreign import. Thus, in the same year, Iga began intensive research into aviation using Western books while ensconced in the Iga family manor in Tokyo. He eventually developed a new model biplane, which was powered by rubber bands. In September, with the encouragement of Tokyo Imperial University Professor Tanakadate Aikitsu, Iga applied for a patent for the "Iga-type Biplane." Iga also began a deep correspondence with several of the leading figures in Japanese aviation at the time, including the aforementioned Kumazō Hino and Yoshitoshi Tokugawa, as well as the then-captain of the Imperial Japanese Army balloon reconnaissance division, Kumao Tokunaga. In the same year, Iga founded the Japanese Aircraft Association (Nihon hikōki kyōkai), which was headquartered at the Iga family residence. However, the cost of operating the organization and conducting aviation research began to take their toll on the Iga family finances.

In 1911, Iga was discharged from the Army, which allowed him to finish construction of the bamboo wing for the "Iga-type Biplane." In March, Iga conducted a test flight of his aircraft at the Itabashi horseracing track in Tokyo, using an automobile to pull the aircraft. However, due to the uneven surface of the racetrack, the automobile suffered damage to its wheel, ultimately resulting in the failure of the test flight. Afterwards, Iga began plans for a self-propelled aircraft. The engine would be produced by Narazō Shimazu in Osaka, and mark the first such engine produced in Japan. In December, Iga's new "Iga-type Maizuru" (Dancing Crane) monoplane aircraft, powered by an 8-metre-long (26 ft) engine wholly produced in Japan, was completed. On December 24, 1911, Iga conducted the first test flight in Yoyogi in Tokyo, with other aviation pioneers Yoshitoshi Tokugawa and Tanakadate Aikitsu in attendance. However, one of the three cylinders on the Shimazu-produced engine failed to start, and due to a lack of horsepower, the aircraft was only capable of moving across the ground, but not taking flight. The aircraft was later given over to Kumazō Hino, who improved it the next year and attempted another test flight. Yet this too was unsuccessful, and the aircraft would never end up taking flight.

By 1912, Iga's extravagant spending on aircraft research had earned him the ire of his family, who eventually forced him to give up his efforts. Iga's planned design, the "Iga-type Biplane," would never be completed.

== Later life ==
In 1913 Iga returned to Sukumo, which was part of the former domain of the Iga family as well as his birthplace. He would remain in Sukumo for the next 16 years, residing as an average townsman. During this time, Iga joined the local fire brigade, and assisted in the modernization of its equipment. It was said that Iga was the first to dash off when a fire broke out. He retired from active life in May 1915, though remained interested in the modernization of firefighting methods. In 1929, he contributed to the modernization of local fire departments (such as the introduction of machine water pumps). He became a representative from Kōchi Prefecture in the Greater Japan Firefighting Association (Dai Nihon shōbō kyōkai), and later served as the organization's vice-chairman.

Iga moved to Tokyo in 1930. In 1934 he helped found the Nihon Diizeru, Inc., and afterwards served as head of administration. Around this time, he also worked to advance automobile manufacture in Japan with the assistance of the German company Krupp-Junkers. In 1942, Iga assumed administrative leadership of Adachi Manufacturing, while also acting in an advisory role at Takenaga Furniture Manufacturing. He retired from both positions following the end of World War II, and spent the remainder of his days researching Buddhist statues. On February 25, 1966, Iga died at the age of 70. He is buried at Tofukujiyama in Sukumo City.
