= Swiss Mannlicher M1893 carbine =

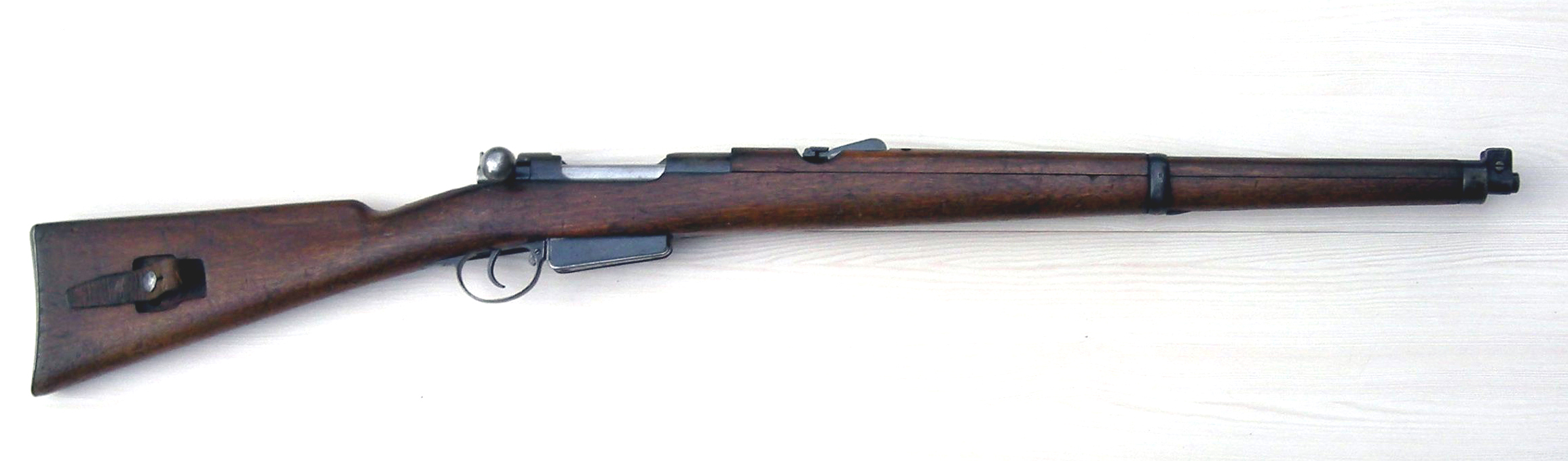
- Type: Straight-pull carbine
- Place of origin: Switzerland

Service history
- In service: 1893–1905
- Used by: Switzerland

Production history
- Designer: Ferdinand Mannlicher
- Designed: 1893
- Manufacturer: SIG, Waffenfabrik Bern
- Produced: 1895–1905
- No. built: 7,750

Specifications
- Mass: 3.08 kg (6.8 lb)
- Length: 100 cm (39 in)
- Barrel length: 55 cm (22 in)
- Cartridge: 7.5×53.5mm Swiss (GP90)
- Action: Straight-pull bolt action
- Muzzle velocity: 1,835 ft/s (559 m/s)
- Effective firing range: 300–1,200 m
- Feed system: 6-round magazine

The Swiss Mannlicher Model 1893 carbine was a straight-pull carbine designed by Ferdinand Mannlicher for use by Swiss cavalry troops. It was based on the Mannlicher action used in the Mannlicher M1890 carbine and Mannlicher M1895 rifle, with differences including the shape of the cocking piece.

The carbine uses a six-round magazine and was chambered for the Swiss 7.5 mm GP90 cartridge. It was manufactured in Switzerland by Schweizerische Industrie Gesellschaft and Waffenfabrik Bern, with production beginning in 1895. The Model 1893 was subsequently replaced by newer small arms as the Swiss Army modernized its service weapons.

== Design ==
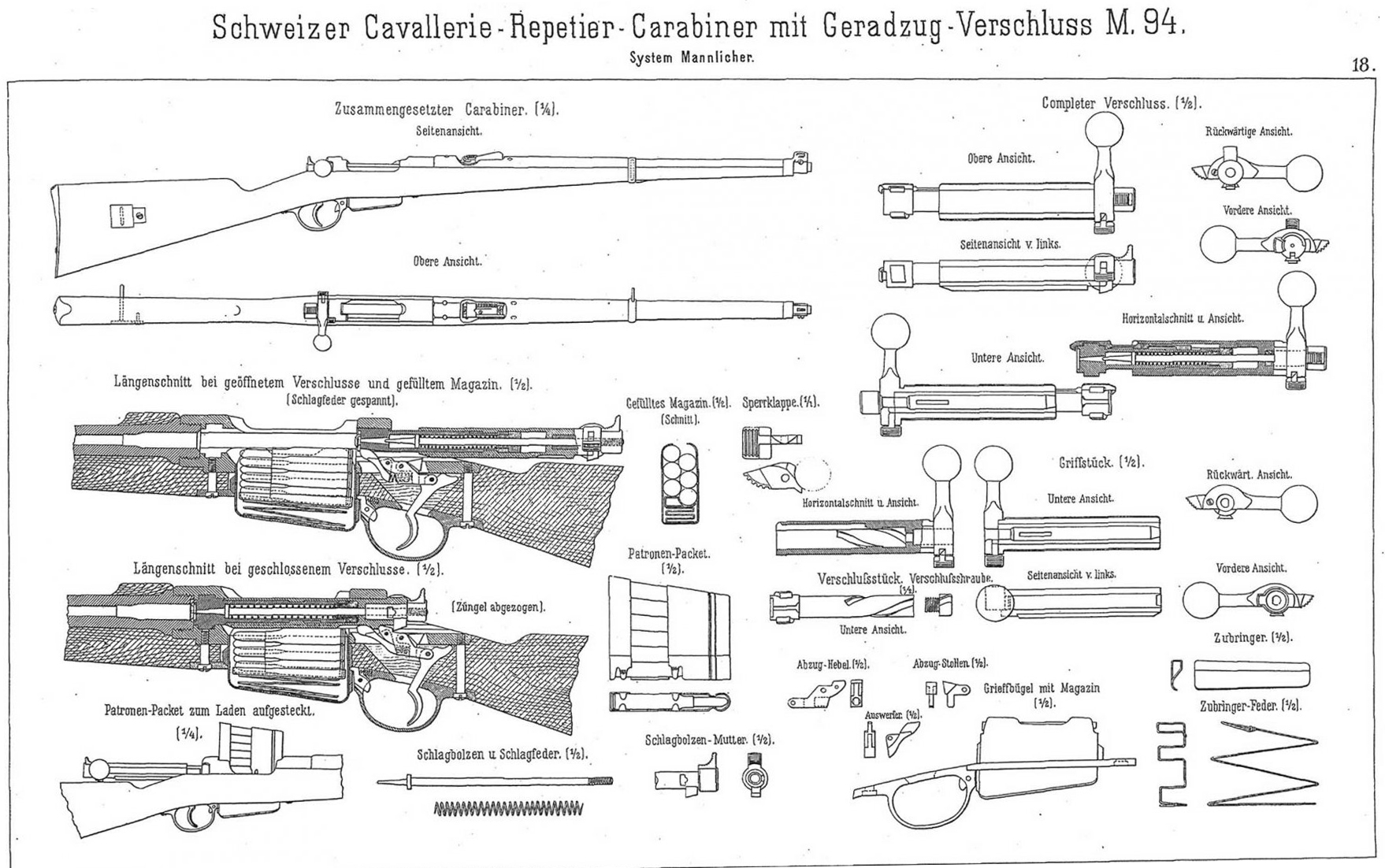
Detailed drawing

The Swiss military was in need of a cavalry carbine for their mounted units, so they tried shortening the existing Schmidt–Rubin 1889, but its action proved to be too long to be effective to maneuver with while mounted, so the Swiss government began trials for a new carbine. Two turning-bolt designs were submitted by SIG, a turning-bolt and a straight-pull design were submitted by Ferdinand Mannlicher, a modified Mauser design and a straight-pull design by Vogelsang and Krauser. The Mannlicher straight-pull design was chosen for its compactness.

It was carried by side sling swivels and didn't feature a bayonet mount. These carbines were supposedly hated by the Swiss soldiers as they were hard to field strip and their bolts were hard to disassemble. Many were intentionally smashed during drills, so today combined with their small manufacture number they are quite rare. It was later replaced by the Schmidt–Rubin Model 1905 Cavalry carbine.

The M1893s were never meant to fire more potent GP11 ammunition and should never be fired using it.
