= Blow forward =

Type of firearm action

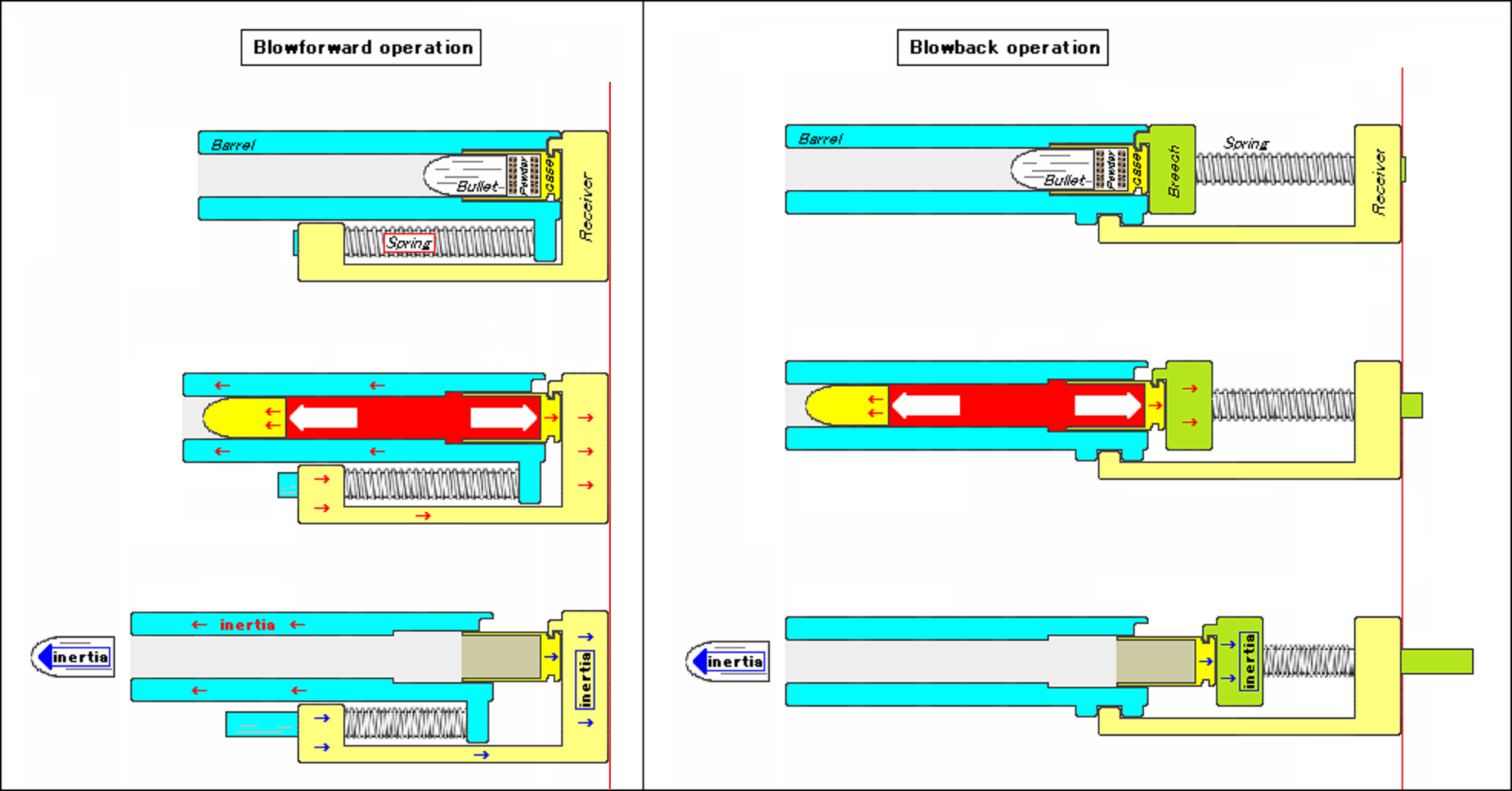
Blow forward (left) vs. blowback (right) operation.

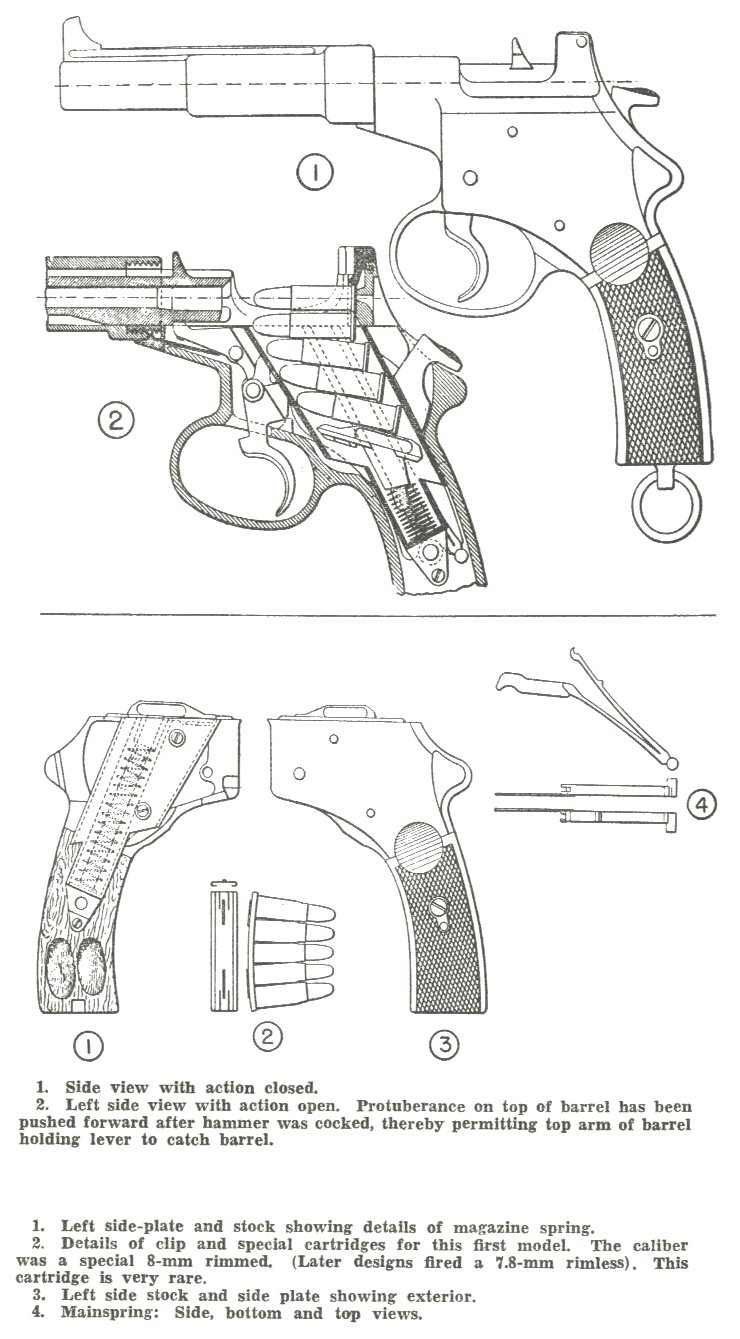
The Mannlicher M1894 pistol, the first blow-forward firearm.

Blow forward is a firearm action where the propellant gas pressure and the friction of the bullet traveling down the bore drag the whole gun barrel forward to facilitate the opening of the breech. This forward barrel motion provides most of the energy required to eject a spent cartridge case and chamber a fresh round of ammunition, and contains a minimum of moving parts, and thus is more compact than other operating mechanisms of equal barrel length.

== Description ==
The vast majority of repeating firearms have their barrel fixed to the receiver or largely immobile in relation to the frame, with the breech face (as part of a moving bolt or slide) moving within the frame against the barrel. In contrast, the frame of a blow-forward firearm incorporates a fixed breech face, with the barrel being mobile and sliding away from the breech (frame) during the weapon's cycling.

Due to the reduced mass of rearward-traveling parts coupled with the increased mass of the forward moving parts (barrel in addition to bullet and propellant gasses), recoil energy is significantly greater than other operating mechanisms. The barrel and spring are generally the only moving parts. Most blow-forward guns rely partially on the inertia of the barrel as the rest of the firearm recoils away from it.

== Examples ==
The first blow-forward firearm was the Mannlicher M1894 pistol, which was protected under U.S. patent 581,296. The principle has been used in a few other weapons, including:

- Schwarzlose Model 1908 7.65mm semiautomatic pistol
- Hino–Komuro Model 1908 8×22mm semiautomatic pistol
- Mk 20 Mod 0 40mm automatic grenade launcher.

For a list of blow-forward firearms, see List of blow-forward firearms

== See also ==
- Blowback
- Recoil operation
- Gas-operated reloading
