= Ferdinand Mannlicher =

Austrian firearms designer (1848 - 1904)

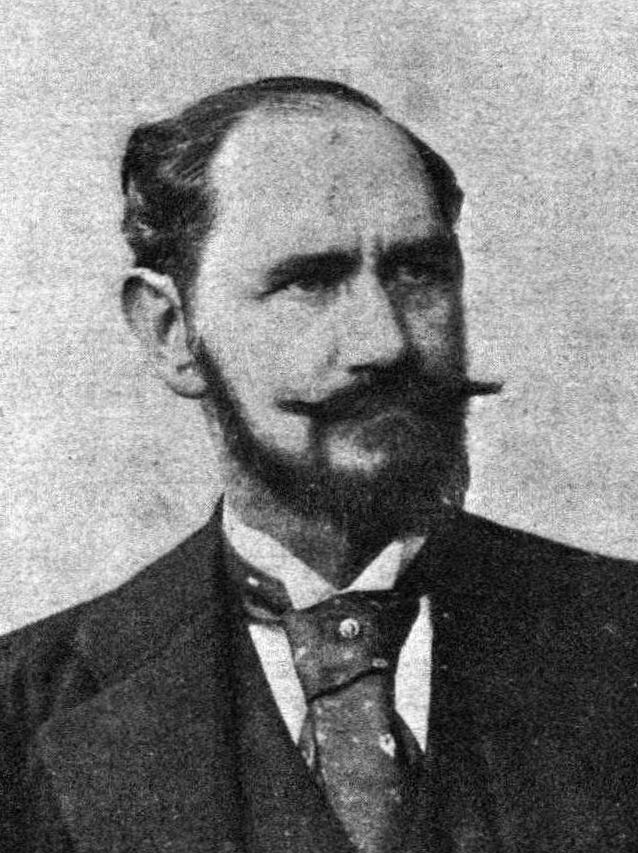
- Born: Ferdinand Karl Adolf Josef Mannlicher; January 30, 1848; Mainz, Grand Duchy of Hesse (Present day, Mainz, Rhineland-Palatinate, Germany)
- Died: January 20, 1904 (aged 55); Vienna, Austria-Hungary (Present day, Vienna, Austria)
- Occupations: Small arms designer, inventor
- Known for: Inventor of the en-bloc clip; Possibly the inventor of the first semi-auto rifle
- Spouse: Caecilie von Mannlicher
- Awards: Order of the Iron Crown (Austria); Order of the Crown (Prussia); Legion of Honour

Ferdinand Ritter von Mannlicher (January 30, 1848 – January 20, 1904) was an Austrian engineer and small arms designer. Along with James Paris Lee, Mannlicher was particularly noted for inventing the en-bloc clip charger-loading box magazine system. Later, while making improvements to other inventors' prototype designs for rotary-feed magazines, Mannlicher, together with his protégé Otto Schönauer, patented a perfected rotary magazine design, the Mannlicher–Schönauer rifle, which was a commercial and military success.

== Life ==
A scion of a long-established bourgeois family originating from Most (German: Brüx) in Bohemia, Mannlicher was born in the German city of Mainz, where his father served as an Austrian k.k. official in the Austrian garrison at the Confederation Fortress. He returned to the Josefstadt district of Vienna with his parents in 1857, and after receiving his Matura high-school exam attended the Vienna University of Technology. He started his professional career in 1869 as an employee of the Austrian Southern Railway company and worked as an engineer at the Emperor Ferdinand Northern Railway company until 1887.

Mannlicher had early turned his interest to weapons technology, particularly breech-loading repeating rifles. His ambitions were fueled by the Austrian defeat in the 1866 Battle of Königgrätz, which he traced back to the inadequate equipment of the Imperial and Royal Army. In 1876 he travelled to the Centennial Exposition in Philadelphia to study numerous construction designs and afterwards drafted several types of repeating rifles with tubular magazines. In 1885-1886 he patented the "Mannlicher System" of a breechblock on a bolt-action basis, which was adopted as a service rifle by the Austro-Hungarian Army in 1886 and by several other armed forces.

In 1878, Mannlicher joined the Austrian Arms Factory company (German: Österreichische Waffenfabriksgesellschaft (ŒWGat)) in Steyr in Upper Austria, which under the name of Steyr Mannlicher became one of the largest weapon-manufacturers in Europe. The model Mannlicher M1895 was widely used by the Austro-Hungarian Army up to and including World War I. In 1887, Mannlicher was awarded the 3rd class of the Order of the Iron Crown (Austria), he also received the Prussian Order of the Crown and the officier medal of the French Legion of Honour. On 14 December 1892 Emperor Franz Joseph of Austria vested him with the title of Ritter von (loosely translated to: 'knight of') due to his earlier ennoblement. In 1899 he was given a lifelong appointment to the Austrian Upper House (Österreichisches Herrenhaus) of the Imperial Council parliament.

Mannlicher's successful designs during his lifetime included bolt-action rifles, both military and sporting, in both turn-bolt and straight-pull actions. Mannlicher also developed several innovative semi-automatic handgun designs in the 1890s. A measure of how far ahead of his time he was can be seen by looking at his experimental designs for semi-automatic rifles, developed at a time when ammunition was not suitable to function properly in such a weapon. In 1883, Mannlicher began development of an automatic rifle firing the 11mm Austrian Werndl, a black-powder cartridge. According to W. H. B. Smith in Mauser, Walther and Mannlicher Firearms, the Mannlicher 1885 became the inspiration for the M1 Garand; and the Mannlicher 1900 with the "short-stroke piston" became the inspiration for the M1 carbine.

== Mannlicher's semi-automatic rifle designs ==
Mannlicher introduced several automatic rifle designs that were unsuccessful, but ahead of their time. He introduced fundamental principles that were used by later designers, often successfully.

Mannlicher's Model 85 semi automatic rifle used his recoil operated action originally developed in 1883; it anticipated the recoiling barrel system used later in designs like the German MG 34 and MG 42 machineguns, and the M1941 Johnson machine gun. The Model 85 would have fit the same tactical role as the American BAR or British Bren of World War II fame.

The Model 91 semi-automatic rifle was designed to use the 7.92×57mm Mauser cartridge and the Model 88 rifle clip. Like the Model 85 it was a recoil operated action like the later Remington Model 8 and M1941 Johnson rifle.

Mannlicher designed two semi-automatic rifles both called Model 93, one based on his turn-bolt rifle and the other based on his straight-pull rifle. The rifles had a recoil spring housing behind the bolt and the bolt locking lugs were angled, so the bolt started turning on firing, essentially a hesitation lock or delayed blowback much like the later Thompson Autorifle utilising the Blish lock. In this system there was no recoiling barrel nor gas piston as with other rifle-caliber autoloading designs, so the mechanism was simple, but ejection of fired cartridge casings was so fierce as to be hazardous to bystanders.

The Model 95 semi-automatic rifle was gas operated using a slide with the cocking handle on its side and gas piston at its front to operate the bolt, with the recoil spring operating on the slide. Loading was with the Mannlicher packet clip of cartridges inserted into the magazine from the top. These features were also used in the later U.S. M1 Garand rifle.

The Model 1900 semi-automatic rifle was also gas operated but used a short stroke piston with a camming lug that engaged the bolt to open it. The bolt was then carried to the rear by momentum with the recoil spring operating on the bolt. The US M1 carbine used a short stroke piston to impart momentum to a slide that opened the bolt, combining features introduced in the Mannlicher Model 95 and Model 100.

The Model 1905 used a short recoil action with a tilting locking block. This was same principle Mannlicher used in his 1901 pistol-caliber carbine. However, for the rifle he scaled it up to 8mm Mauser, the standard German military rifle cartridge. The rifle also used a Schönauer rotary magazine, and sights copied from the Mauser Gewehr 98. Although his company patented the design in 1905, Mannlicher's death in 1904 ended any further development of the design.

== Mannlicher's semi-automatic pistol designs ==
Mannlicher was one of the early pioneers of semi-automatic handgun design. Mannlicher produces his first patents and handguns at Steyr in 1894, a blow-forward design using a rimmed centerfire 6.5mm and a 7.6mm cartridge loaded into an internal magazine via a stripper clip. In 1896 Mannlicher improved his handgun designs with magazine forward of trigger that shoots 7.65 Borchardt ammunition.

Mannlicher's most successful pistol design derives from his 1900 patents for what is commonly called the Mannlicher M1901, a self-loader is introduced by Steyr. It is stripper fed, loading cartridges into a fixed magazine in the grip. The breach opening is delayed but unlocked, and a reciprocating breechblock ejects and loads cartridges. It shoots a 7.63mm Mannlicher rimless straight-sided centerfire cartridge (not to be confused with other 7.63 bottleneck cartridges).

The M1901 will continue to be manufactured with slight upgrades, and a variant of this gun will be manufactured in quality for export to Argentina as the model 1905.

== List of firearms named after Ferdinand Mannlicher ==
- Mannlicher M1885, semi-automatic rifle
- Mannlicher M1886, straight-pull rifle
- Mannlicher M1888, straight-pull rifle
  - 8×52mmR Mannlicher cartridge
  - Mannlicher M1890 Rifle
- Mannlicher M1890 carbine, straight-pull rifle
- Mannlicher M1891, semi-automatic rifle
- Mannlicher M1893, semi-automatic rifle
- Mannlicher M1893, turning-bolt rifle
- Swiss Mannlicher M1893 carbine, straight-pull carbine
- Mannlicher M1894, semi-automatic pistol
- Mannlicher M1895, straight-pull rifle
- Mannlicher M1900, semi-automatic rifle
- Mannlicher M1901, semi-automatic pistol
  - 7.65 × 21 mm Mannlicher, a pistol cartridge
- Mannlicher M1905, semi-automatic pistol
- Mannlicher–Schönauer, bolt-action rifle
  - 6.5×54mm Mannlicher–Schönauer, a rifle cartridge
  - 9.5×57mm Mannlicher–Schönauer, a rifle cartridge
- Geweer M. 95, also known to collectors as the Dutch Mannlicher, a service rifle
- 8×50mmR Mannlicher, a service cartridge
- 6.5×53mmR, also known as the .256 Mannlicher, a rimmed centerfire military rifle cartridge

== Patents ==
U.S. patent 472,795 Repeating Firearm. April 12, 1892. (Rifle)

U.S. patent 518,821 Feed Mechanism for Magazine-Guns. Granted April 24, 1894. (Rifle)

U.S. patent 581,295 Automatic Firearm. Granted April 27, 1897. (Rifle)

U.S. patent 581,296 Automatic Firearm. Granted April 27, 1897. (Pistol, Steyr Mannlicher M1894)

U.S. patent 728,739 Automatic Firearm. Granted May 19, 1903. (Rifle)

U.S. patent 804,748 Small-Arm Having Automatic Breech-Action. Granted November 14, 1905. (Rifle, granted posthumously)
