= Steyr MPi 69 =

MPi 69
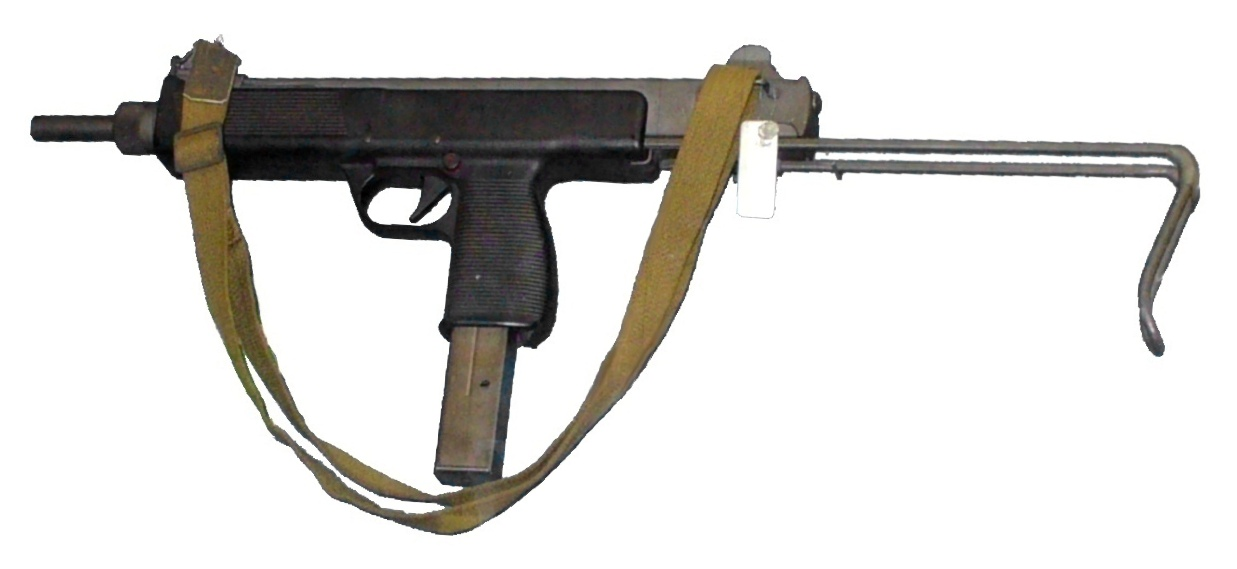
- Type: Submachine gun
- Place of origin: Austria

Service history
- Used by: See Users
- Wars: Salvadoran Civil War; Lebanese Civil War

Production history
- Designer: Steyr
- Designed: 1960s
- Manufacturer: Steyr
- Produced: 1969–1990
- Variants: MPi 81

Specifications
- Mass: 3.13 kg (6.90 lb)
- Length: 670 mm (26.4 in) stock extended 465 mm (18.3 in) stock collapsed
- Barrel length: 260 mm (10.2 in)
- Cartridge: 9×19mm Parabellum
- Action: Blowback
- Rate of fire: MPi 69: 550 rounds/min, MPi 81: 700 rounds/min
- Muzzle velocity: 381 m/s (1,250 ft/s)
- Effective firing range: 150 m
- Feed system: 25 or 32-round detachable box magazine
- Sights: Fore, blade; rear, flip aperture 326 mm (12.8 in) sight radius

The Steyr MPi 69 is a 9×19mm submachine gun of the late 20th century made by the Austrian firm Steyr.

== Characteristics ==
The MPi 69 is shaped much like other telescoping bolt submachineguns, such as the MAC 10 or Uzi. It has a vertical pistol handgrip into which the magazine is inserted, and a longer horizontal front grip area; it also has a folding stock.

Featuring a design unusual among modern submachine guns, the MPi 69 is cocked by a dual-purpose lever also used as the front sling attachment point. The forward handgrip and vertical pistol handgrip are all one large plastic molding, forming the front and center bottom part of the weapon. The receiver proper is a square metal tube which partly nestles inside the plastic handgrip.

== Production status ==
In 1990, the MPi 81 was replaced by the TMP in the product line, though the TMP was also discontinued by Steyr, which sold the design to Brügger & Thomet; it was subsequently improved as the Brügger & Thomet MP9.

== Variants ==
=== MPi 81 ===
- The MPi 81 is a more modern, product improved version of the MPi 69 introduced in 1981. It has a conventional cocking handle on the left side of the receiver and other minor improvements, including an increased firing rate of 700 rpm. A "Loop Hole" model meant to function as a port firing weapon was also made, fitted with an AUG optic and a longer barrel with a fitting for a firing port.

== Users ==
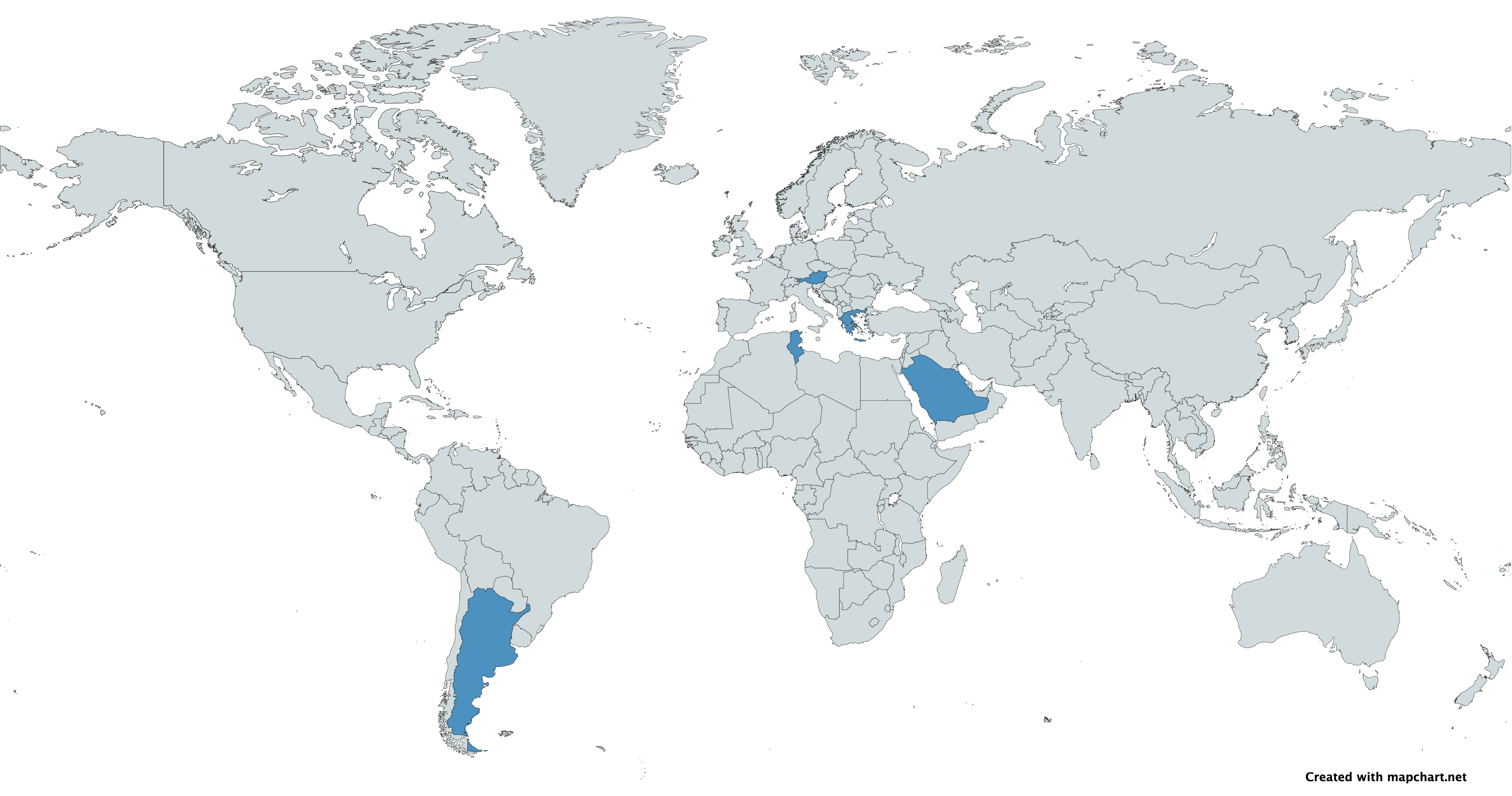
Map with Steyr MPi 69 users in blue

- Argentina
- Austria
- Greece
- Saudi Arabia
- Tunisia

== See also ==
- ENARM SMG
- PM-84 Glauberyt
- Ruger MP9
- Uzi

== Bibliography ==
- Crawford, Steve (2003). Twenty-first Century Small Arms: The World's Great Infantry Weapons. St. Paul, MN: Zenith Imprint. ISBN 978-0-7603-1503-3.
