= Steyr M1912 pistol =

Steyr M1912
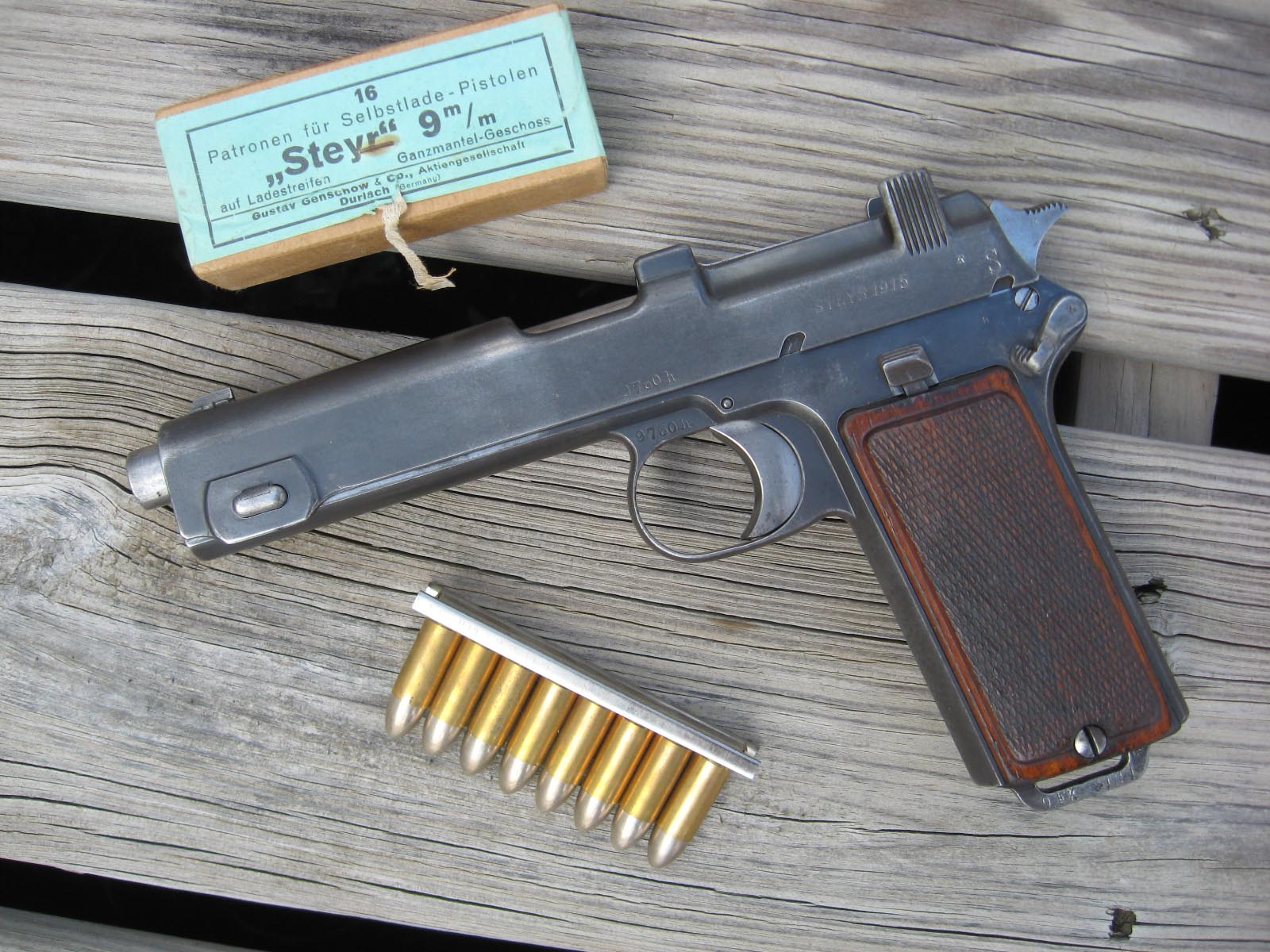
- Steyr M1912 with box and charger clip for 9×23mm Steyr ammunition
- Type: Semi-automatic pistol
- Place of origin: Austria-Hungary

Service history
- Used by: See § Users
- Wars: World War I; Polish–Soviet War; World War II

Production history
- Designer: Karl Murgthaler, Helmut Bachner, Adolf Jungmayr
- Designed: 1909–1910
- Manufacturer: Œ.W.G.
- Produced: 1912–1920s
- No. built: Up to 300,000
- Variants: See § Variants

Specifications
- Mass: 1.2 kg (2.6 lb)
- Length: 216 mm (8.5 in)
- Barrel length: 128 mm (5.0 in)
- Height: 142 mm (5.6 in)
- Cartridge: 9mm Steyr (Austro-Hungarian); 9mm Parabellum (German)
- Action: Recoil-operated
- Muzzle velocity: 1,230 ft/s (375 m/s) (Note: 9mm Steyr cartridge uses a 115 gr (7 g) full metal jacket bullet, with a 1,230 ft/s (370 m/s) muzzle velocity, with 388 ft·lbf (526 J) of energy using Hirtenberger ammunition.)
- Effective firing range: 50 m (160 ft)
- Feed system: 8-round integral magazine, fed by stripper clips
- Sights: Iron sights, tangent rear sight
- References: Jane's

The Steyr M1912, also known as the Steyr-Hahn, is an Austro-Hungarian semi-automatic pistol developed by Österreichische Waffenfabriks-Gesellschaft (Œ.W.G.) and adopted by the Austro-Hungarian Army in 1912. The pistol was developed in the years preceding its adoption and became one of the principal Austro-Hungarian military pistols of World War I.

The M1912 was designed for military service and saw extensive use during World War I. Examples remained in service after the dissolution of Austria-Hungary and were still used during World War II.

The M1912 was originally chambered for the 9mm Steyr cartridge. It incorporated a distinctive locking system and an external hammer, giving rise to the Hahn ("hammer") designation. The pistol was designed with military field use in mind and was noted for its ability to remain functional under difficult battlefield conditions.

== History ==
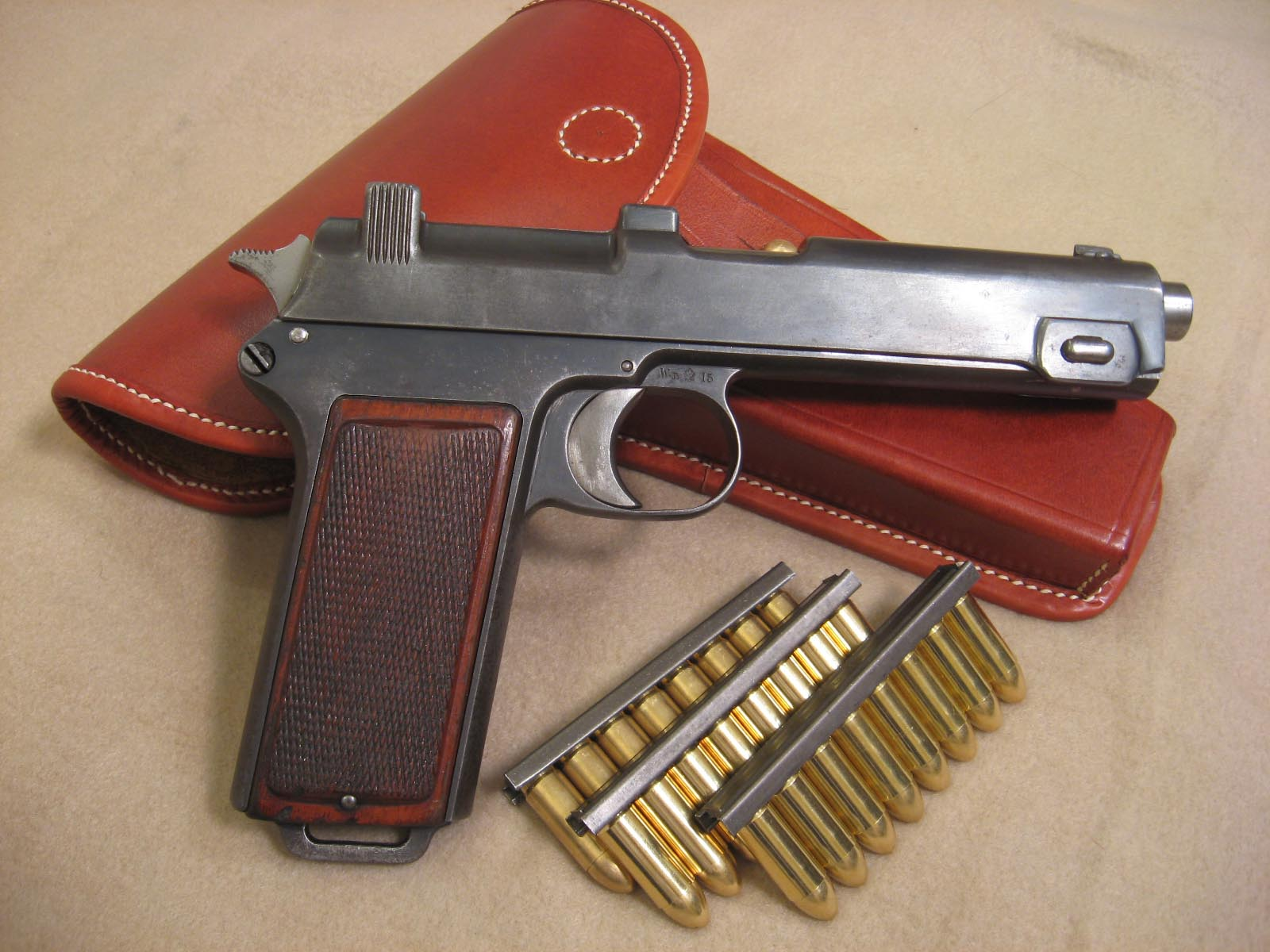
A 1915-made Steyr-Hahn M1912 chambered in 9mm Steyr with holster and ammunition

The M1912 was developed as the Model 1911, a military pistol, but it was not accepted into service until 1914 as the M12. It was originally issued to the Austrian Landwehr while common army units were issued Roth–Steyr M1907 handguns and Rast & Gasser M1898 revolvers. Orders were also placed by Chile and Romania. During World War I, Austria-Hungary experienced shortages of handguns and production of the M1912 was increased. Germany also placed an order for 10,000 Model 12s, and it was available commercially as the Steyr M1911, which was quite popular with army officers.

After the World War I, the production continued until 1920 for the purpose of re-equipping of first the Austrian Volkswehr and later the regular Austrian army (Bundesheer), and also for reparation deliveries to the newly independent Czechoslovakia. A small batch of the M.12 pistols was also manufactured in the 1930s for the Austrian army, but these deliveries had to be kept secret due to Austria being still bound by the provisions of the Treaty of St. Germain.

After Germany annexed Austria in 1938, the German Police ordered 60,000 M1912 pistols rechambered to 9mm Parabellum, which remained in service until the end of World War II.

== Design details ==
The Steyr M1912 handgun is operated by a system of short recoil, the barrel unlocking from the slide by rotation. As the pistol is being fired and the recoil of the pistol is in motion, a lug and groove system around the barrel rotate the barrel 20° until a lug hits a stop wedge and holds the barrel while the slide is free to continue its rearward travel, the extractor claw withdrawing the spent casing against the breech face of the slide until the casing strikes the ejector and departs the weapon via the ejection and loading port. Shortly after ejection the slide's rearward travel is arrested by the compressed recoil spring and the abutment of mated surfaces of the slide and frame. The recoil spring is now free to return its stored energy to the cycle of the weapon by beginning to return the slide forward.

As the return spring returns the slide forward, the breech face strips a round from the magazine into the chamber and the locking system engages the barrel and locks it with the slide in the battery position. A safety lever on the left side of the frame can be engaged by turning it into a notch on the slide to immobilize the slide. A disconnector system will also prevent the weapon from firing until the whole action is fully closed.

Although the magazine is situated in the grip, it is integral with the weapon and is loaded from above using eight-round stripper clips. To load, the slide is pulled back to expose the action, the clip is inserted along the guides and the rounds pushed into the magazine. The metal strip is then discarded. As with the majority of pistols with integral magazines, a lever can be used to disengage the magazine catch in order to eject the magazine load.

== Variants ==
=== Anschlagspistole M.12 ===
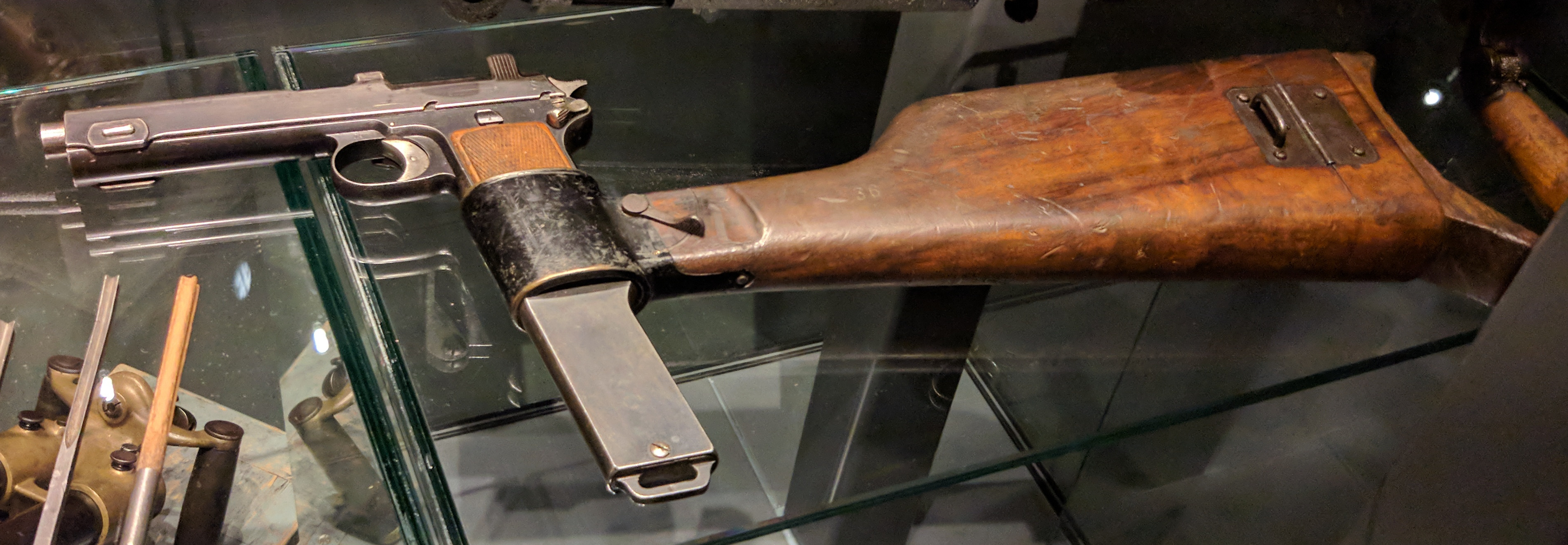
Steyr Ansclagspistole M.12 was a machine pistol with an extended magazine and fitted stock to control recoil.

A machine pistol version of the Steyr M1912, designated as the Anschlagspistole M.12, was developed at the Österreichische Waffenfabriksgesellschaft in 1916. A Standschützen officer - one Herr Hellriegel - also developed a submachine gun that was tested in Tyrol in late 1915, implying that there was some interest in machine-pistols and SMGs within the army.

The Anschlagspistole M.12 machine-pistol was an automatic conversion of the standard M.12 service pistol. The only technical difference between the standard M.12 and the Anschlagspistole M.12 was the addition of a fire selector, situated on the right side of the trigger group. This gave an automatic fire rate of about 800 rounds per minute. Sometime in 1916, a small batch of prototypes was delivered for field trials. These early models fed from the M.12's standard 8-round internal magazine and, against a firing rate of 800rpm, they could only fire a burst before depleting. The full production model extended the internal magazine to 16 rounds - an improvement, but still less than ideal. Topping off the magazine, either by feeding two 8- round clips or manually loading each cartridge by hand, was also slow and cumbersome.

After successful trials, the Anschlagspistole M.12 was accepted into service, reportedly with an order of 300 units being placed. They were issued exclusively on the Italian Front, to Tyrolean regiments fighting in the Alps. It is not known whether they were fielded as trench-clearing weapons; Austria in 1916 was fighting a mostly defensive war against the Italians, and there is no indication that the weapon was commissioned for use by shock troops, although it is possible that they were issued to some Sturmbataillons in 1917.

The associated patent for the fire-selector was finally approved in December 1919, having been applied for three years earlier, although there is nothing to suggest that the weapon was ever produced again.

In a series of articles between 1980 and 1981 Lothar Sengewitz wrote for the German magazine Deutsches Waffen-Journal contradictory and likely false accounts about the Anschlagspistole M.12, claiming that it was actually called the M.12/P16 (Patrone 16), designed by an officer of the Standschutz under the name of Major Franz Xaver Fuchs, that General von Hotzendorff was personally impressed by the weapon and ordered an immediate batch of 10,000 guns, that Engelbert Dollfuss was assassinated by a M.12/P16 and that Germany rebarrelled some to 9x19mm and gave them silencers for use with Brandenburgers. All of this is almost certainly untrue and simply written for an interesting story in a magazine.

=== Doppelpistole M.12 ===
A dual pistol mount and stock was also developed that converted two Anschlagspistole M12s into a (double pistol) submachine gun such weapon known as the Doppelpistole M1912. A wooden carrying case, similar to that issued with the Villar Perosa, was also made for the Doppelpistole, the idea seems to have been experimental and never came into wide issue.

=== 9mm P12(ö) ===
After Germany annexed Austria in 1938, the German Police ordered 60,000 M1912 pistols rechambered in 9 mm Parabellum which remained in service until the end of World War II. In German service, its official designation was 9mm P12 (ö) (ö for Österreichisch, "Austrian"). Pistols in police service were distinguished by the eagle emblem above the trigger and most noticeably a "08" stamp on the left side of the slide, to show that they chambered German 1908-type ammunition."

== Historical uses ==
- The Austrian historian Kurt Bauer, in his monograph on the failed National Socialist coup of July 1934 in Austria, identifies the weapon used by Otto Planetta to shoot Chancellor Engelbert Dollfuss as a "Steyr-Selbstladepistole Type 12" (Steyr M1912 pistol) in 9 mm Steyr caliber. Other sources specialized in the history of firearms also confirm this fact.

== Users ==
- Austria-Hungary
- Austria — 16,385 pistols were used by the First Austrian Republic.
- Bulgaria — Obtained after World War I and remained in use until World War II.
- Chile
- Czechoslovakia — In use after independence.
- German Empire
- Nazi Germany
- Kingdom of Italy
- Italian Social Republic
- Poland
- Romania

== Bibliography ==
- McNab, Chris (2002). Twentieth-Century Small Arms. Hoo, Rochester, Kent, UK: Grange Books. ISBN 978-1-84013-381-3.
