= Mannlicher M1894 =

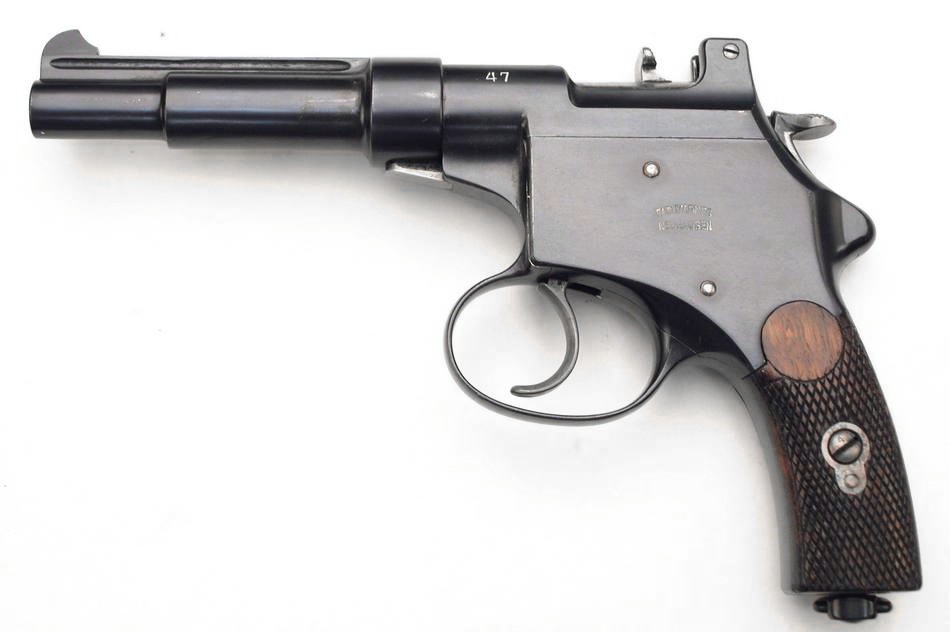
- Type: Semi-automatic pistol
- Place of origin: Austria-Hungary / Switzerland

Production history
- Designer: Ferdinand Mannlicher
- Designed: 1894
- Manufacturer: Fabrique d'Armes de Neuhausen; Dreyse
- Produced: 1894–1897
- No. built: Fewer than 300

Specifications
- Cartridge: 6.5×23mmR; 7.6×24mmR
- Action: Blow-forward
- Muzzle velocity: 326 m/s (1,070 ft/s)
- Feed system: 5-round stripper clip into magazine
- Sights: Iron sights

The Mannlicher M1894 was an early semi-automatic pistol designed by Ferdinand Mannlicher in Austria-Hungary. It was notable for employing an unusual blow-forward operating system, in which the barrel moved forward during the firing cycle. The pistol was produced in small numbers between 1894 and 1897 and was manufactured in several variants and chamberings.

The M1894 was one of the earliest practical applications of the blow-forward principle to a self-loading pistol. Its unconventional mechanism distinguished it from the blowback and recoil-operated designs that subsequently became more common. The pistol was evaluated in military trials, including by Austrian, Swiss, and United States authorities, but was not adopted for widespread military service.

== General features ==
External videos
- Mannlicher M1894 closer look

The earliest Ferdinand Mannlicher pistol, manufactured by Fabrique D'Armes de Neuhausen, Switzerland, was designed to be self-loading and to use a special rimmed cartridge in 6.5 mm caliber. The design represented an entirely new utilization of mechanical principles in automatic action called "blow-forward action". In the standard type of automatic action for low-powered cartridges, the recoil (or blow-back) is utilized to drive back a movable breech face or block, but Mannlicher utilized the principle of a rigid standing breech with the barrel blowing forward to extract, eject, and prepare for reloading.

A special barrel housing which carries the sight covers the entire length of the barrel (6.49 in/165 mm) when the arm is closed. A heavy recoil spring is mounted concentrically around the barrel within this housing and is compressed between a shoulder at the forward end of the casing and a shoulder at the rear of the barrel.

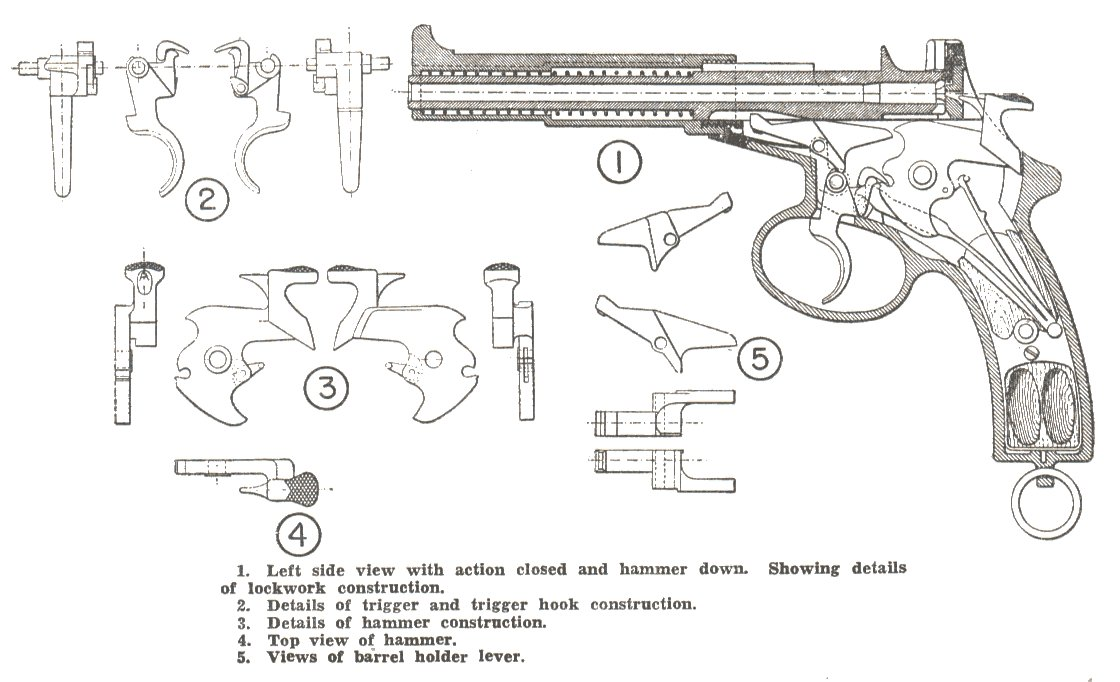

An unusual element in this design is a three-armed "barrel-holding lever". It is pivoted above the trigger as shown in the drawing from page 188, Mannlicher Rifles and Pistols, Smith, 1947. Its bottom arm engages with the trigger. The forward arm holds the barrel forward for loading. The rear arm serves as a hammer catch.

== Firing mechanism ==
To load this weapon the hammer is cocked. As the hammer rotates on its axis pin, it acts upon the trigger, and the sear snaps into the cocking notch, holding the hammer. The hammer axis pin also supports the center arm of the barrel holding lever, which arm emerges and is raised high enough by its spring to press into a slot under the barrel. The rising thumbpiece on top of the barrel over the breech is then pushed forward. The barrel moves forward until its muzzle emerges from the barrel housing, compressing the recoil spring. The barrel holding lever is snapped into the locking notch in the underside of the barrel, thereby holding it in forward position for charging.

The stripper clip (capacity five rounds) is inserted in the clip guide of the receiver and the cartridges are pressed into the magazine. The cartridges are stripped off the clip and pressed into the magazine-well in the body of the pistol, compressing the spiral magazine-spring. A lip at the top prevents the cartridges from emerging.

The preferred direction for holding this pistol requires that the index finger be positioned around the frame above the trigger guard, with the middle finger through the trigger guard and pressed against the trigger.

As the trigger is pulled, the sear is released of engagement to allow the mainspring to drive the hammer forward slightly, but the rear arm on the barrel holding lever catches in a notch in the hammer to hold the hammer in firing position. The lowering of the forward arm of the barrel holding lever frees the barrel, allowing the compressed recoil spring to drive the barrel back, stripping the top cartridge from the magazine, chambering the round, and pressing the cartridge head against the standing breech. The M1894 is a double action firearm; the hammer can either be cocked manually for each shot, with the trigger performing the single action of releasing the sear, or it can be fired double-action, in which the trigger pull both cocks the hammer and releases the sear, at the expense of a heavier trigger pull.

As the propellant combusts and expands, the standing breech (a rigid, immovable object) acts to prohibit rearward movement of the cartridge and causes the expanding forces to move against the bullet (a somewhat more movable object), propelling the bullet toward the muzzle. The friction of forward motion of the bullet projectile against the inside of the barrel causes the bullet to act as a quasi-plug in the barrel. The barrel (a very movable object) is pushed forward by the motion and direction of the expanding gases against the friction of the traveling projectile, until the bullet exits the muzzle, after which forward motion of the barrel is due to inertia. Forward motion of the barrel is arrested by the progressively increasing tension of the recoil spring. The recoil of this pistol is somewhat higher than that of a conventional semi-automatic handgun, as there are no rearward moving parts to absorb recoil energy and spread the forces out over a longer period of time. It is no worse, however, than a revolver of equivalent power.

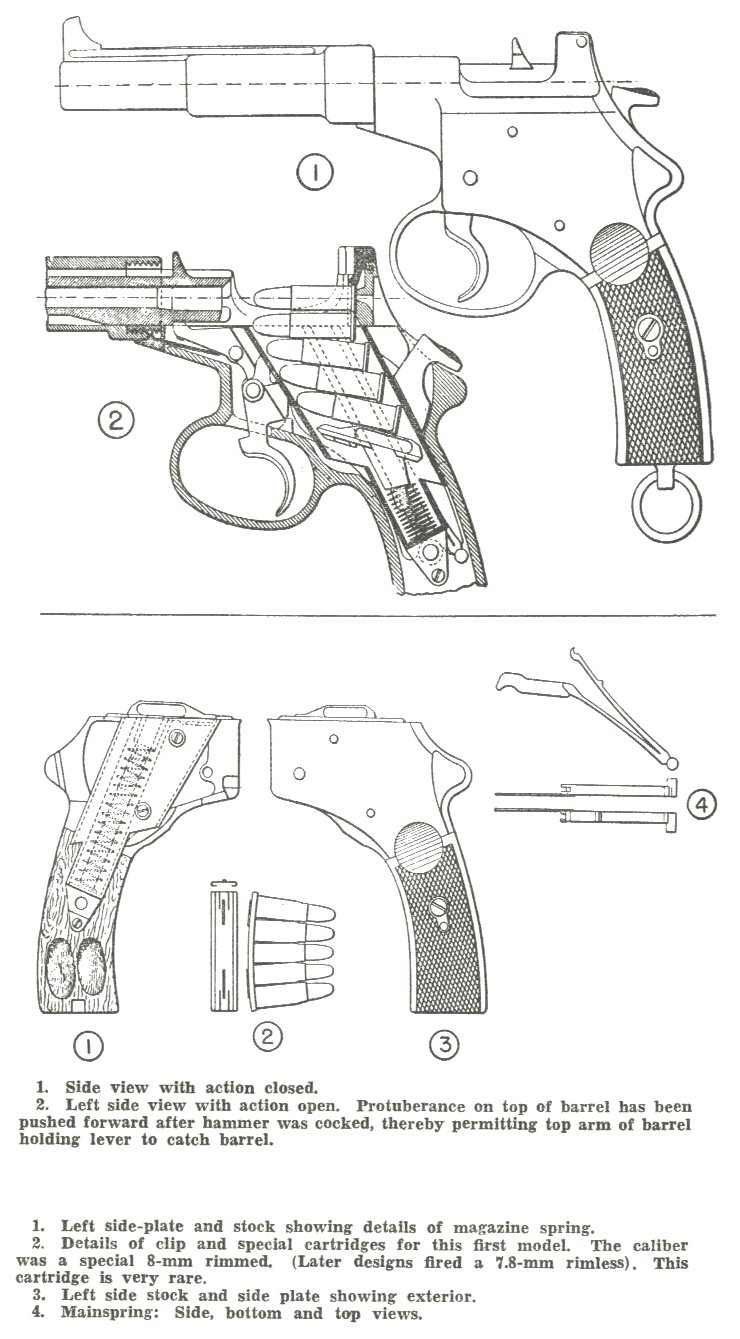

The extractor is mounted on the left side of the barrel extension. As the barrel moves forward the extractor draws the empty case from the face of the standing breech to eject it. The barrel holding lever arm moves up by action of the trigger, and catches the barrel in forward position. The magazine spring, pushing against the follower, forces the cartridges up to present the next cartridge for loading. As the trigger is released and moves forward it acts on the bottom arm of the barrel holding lever causing it to pivot and its forward upper arm to release the barrel. The barrel is then driven back by the recoil spring to load the next cartridge.

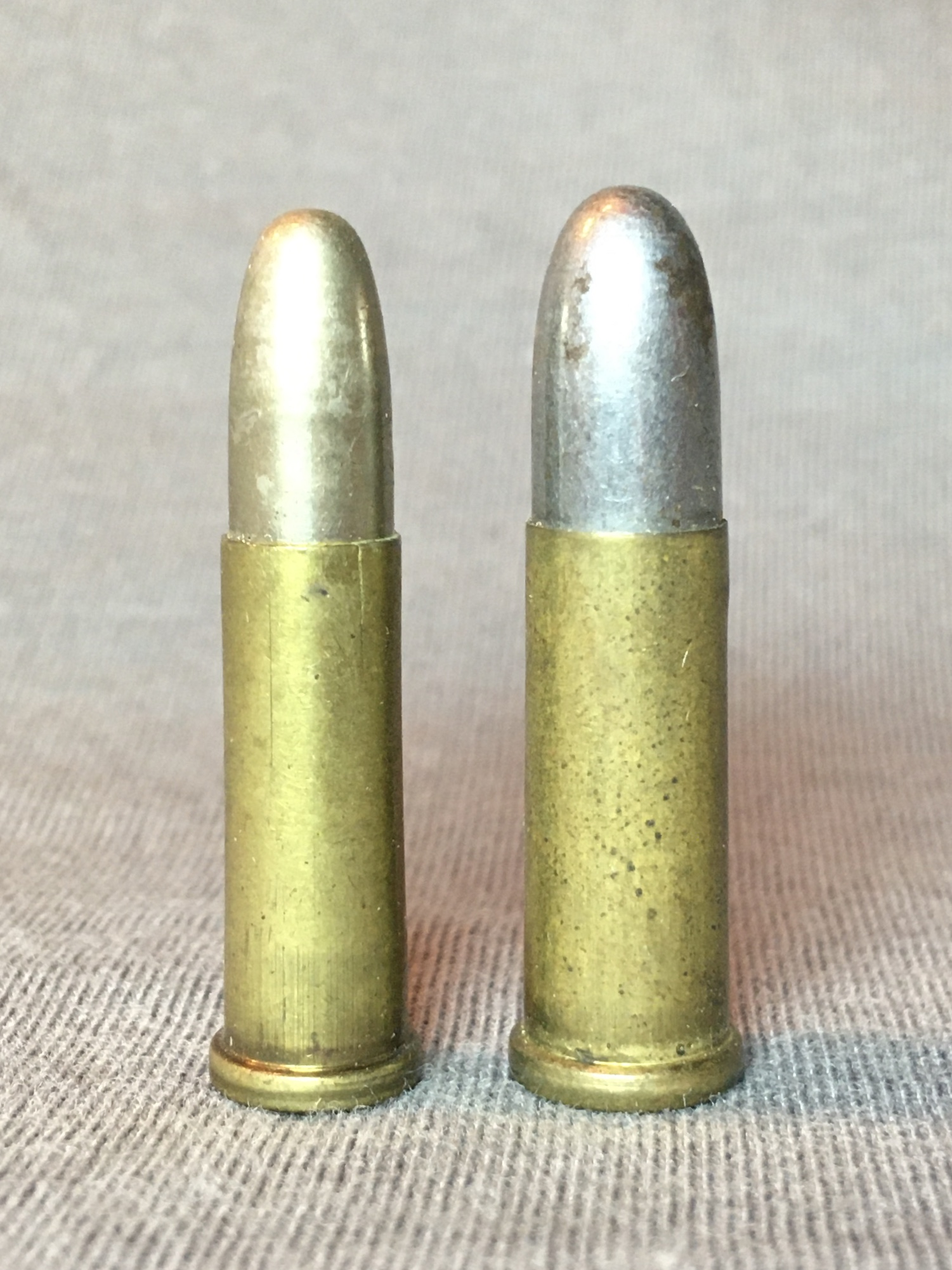
Austrian 6,50 and 7,60 mm Mannlicher M.1894 pistol cartridges.

== Models ==
The 1894 was originally classed as a "half automatic or semi-automatic pistol". The overall length of the 6.5 mm model displayed in the photo illustrations on this page is 8.46 in (215 mm), dry weight is 30 oz (850 g).

There were several modifications of this pistol during its production until 1897. In some, the barrel catch does not operate during firing movement, so that the pistol closes to become fully self-loading. In no models, however, does the automatic action extend to cocking the self-loading pistol. In all variations the hammer must be cocked by thumb to fire or must be cocked and dropped in double action mechanical fashion by a pull on the trigger.

Experimental versions of this arm were also manufactured with a single action movement in which it was necessary to cock the hammer by thumb for each shot. Other types also used experimental forms of grip safeties. Late versions of these pistols were made to shoot a special 7.8 mm rimless cartridge with a straight sided case.

== Historical references ==
The pistols were tested by the US Army at the Springfield Armory in June 1900. They did not recommend the use of the pistol, primarily because of the poor function during the test. Cartridges frequently jammed or misfired, and the barrel burst after the 281st round.

While this pistol is very simple in construction the operation of loading is very tedious and slow, and would be almost impossible for a man to load it while on horseback. The muscular exerts practically the same as for an ordinary double-action revolver, while the rate of fire is much slower.

The design similarly failed Austrian and Swiss military trials. Total production was approximately 150 by Steyr chambered for the 7.6 mm Mannlicher cartridge, and less than half as many by SIG in 7.5 mm caliber for Swiss military trials.

== See also ==
- U.S. patent 581,296
- Hino Komuro M1908 Pistol
- Infantry Weapons of WWI
- Roth-Steyr M1907
- Steyr Mannlicher M1901
