= Hino Kumazō =

Japanese inventor and aviation pioneer

- 日野 熊蔵
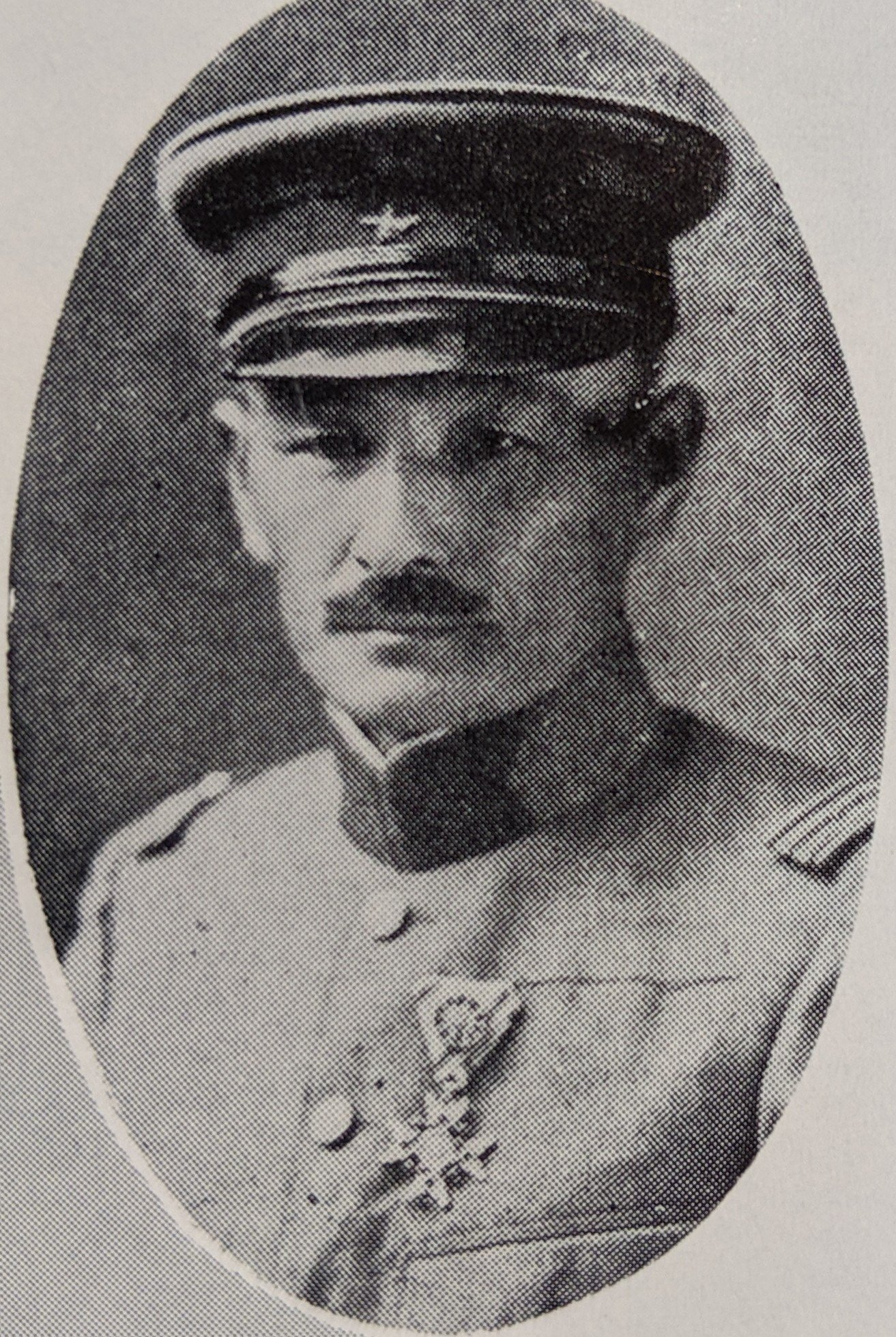
- Born: June 9, 1878; Hitoyoshi, Japan
- Died: January 15, 1946 (aged 67); Tokyo, Japan
- Occupations: Inventor, aviator

Hino Kumazō (日野 熊蔵, Hino Kumazō; June 9, 1878 – January 15, 1946) was a Japanese inventor and aviation pioneer. His most famous invention is the 1908 Hino–Komuro pistol.

== Biography ==
Hino was born in Hitoyoshi, Kumamoto, as the eldest son of the samurai of Sagara Domain. After attending military preparatory schools, he graduated from the 10th class of the Imperial Japanese Army Academy in 1898. He invented the Hino–Komuro pistol in 1908 together with acquaintance and investor Tomojiro Komuro, after extensive research on patents for pistols in the United States and United Kingdom. However, during testing, two accidents caused by structural defects left him with severe injuries to his left hand, including the loss of a finger.

In 1909, Hino joined Yoshitoshi Tokugawa in France to study aeronautical engineering and military applications for the use of aircraft in combat. He was unable to purchase an aircraft engine in France, and moved to Germany on July 25, where he learned flight control skills at Johannisthal Air Field and purchased a Grade monoplane, which he shipped back to Japan. On 14 December 1910 he flew Japan's first successful aircraft flight at Yoyogi Parade Ground where Tokyo's Yoyogi Park is now located; however, as the 60-meter flight was unpowered and had few witnesses, it received very little publicity. On 19 December 1910, Yoshitoshi Tokugawa flew Japan's first successful powered aircraft flight at Yoyogi Parade Ground, which was by contrast high-publicized, and Hino's earlier flight was all but forgotten. Tokugawa and Hino promoted the new technology to the Imperial Japanese Army General Staff and helped establish the Imperial Japanese Army Air Service, with Tokugawa going on to receive accolades and promotion and Hino working in obscurity attempting to develop a domestic aircraft design and aircraft engine. Hino was promoted to major in 1911, but was immediately demoted to a lower position of authority over his failure to produce a successful aircraft, mounting debts, and an embarrassing situation in which he forgot about a scheduled visit by a member of the Imperial family, Prince Takehiko Yamashina to view aircraft development. In 1916, he was transferred to the Koishikawa Arsenal and in 1918 was promoted to lieutenant colonel on taking voluntary retirement as responsibility for a subordinate's blunder. After that, he tried to make a living as an inventor in the private sector, but many of his inventions did not come to practical use, and he suffered from tuberculosis.

In 1933, Hino developed a design for a helicopter, followed by a ramjet engine in 1935 and the design for a tailless aircraft which was the basis for the Kimura HK-1 and the Kayaba Ku-2 gliders. In 1941, he developed a design of an automatic rifle. From 1942, he turned his attention to rocket development.

Most of his records were lost in the Bombing of Tokyo in 1945, when his home was destroyed, leaving him destitute. Hino died in 1946 of malnutrition.

== See also ==
- M1908 Pistol
