= Iga formicina =

Scientific classification
- Kingdom: Animalia
- Phylum: Arthropoda
- Class: Insecta
- Order: Coleoptera
- Suborder: Adephaga
- Family: Carabidae
- Tribe: Trechini
- Subtribe: Trechina
- Genus: Iga; Ueno, 1953
- Species: I. formicina

Binomial name
- Iga formicina Ueno, 1953

Genus of beetles

Iga is a genus of ground beetles in the family Carabidae. This genus has a single species, Iga formicina. It is found in Japan.
