= Steyr Arms =

Austrian manufacturer of firearms

Steyr Arms GmbH
- Formerly: Steyr Mannlicher
- Type: GmbH
- Industry: Firearms
- Predecessor: Steyr-Daimler-Puch
- Founded: 16 April 1864; 162 years ago
- Founder: Josef Werndl
- Headquarters: Sankt Ulrich bei Steyr (postal address Kleinraming), Austria
- Area served: Worldwide
- Products: Pistols; Rifles; Submachine gun Machine guns Combination guns Grenade launchers
- Parent: RSBC
- Subsidiaries: Steyr Arms Inc.
- Website: www.steyr-arms.com

Steyr Arms (German pronunciation: [ˈʃtaɪɐ]) is a firearms manufacturer based in Austria. Originally part of Steyr-Daimler-Puch, it became independent when the conglomerate was broken up in 1989. Prior to 1 January 2019, the company was named Steyr Mannlicher GmbH Co. KG (German pronunciation: [ˈʃtaɪɐ ˈmanlɪçɐ ʔaːˈɡeː]). In April 2024, the company was acquired by Czech RSBC Holding a.s., which also owns Slovenian gun maker Arex Arms.

== History ==
=== Origins ===
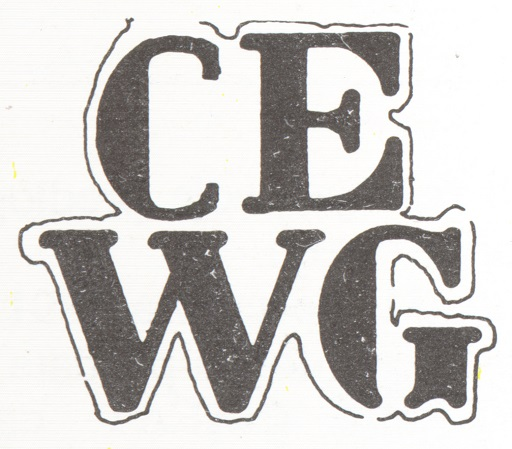
The company logo, 1869–1926

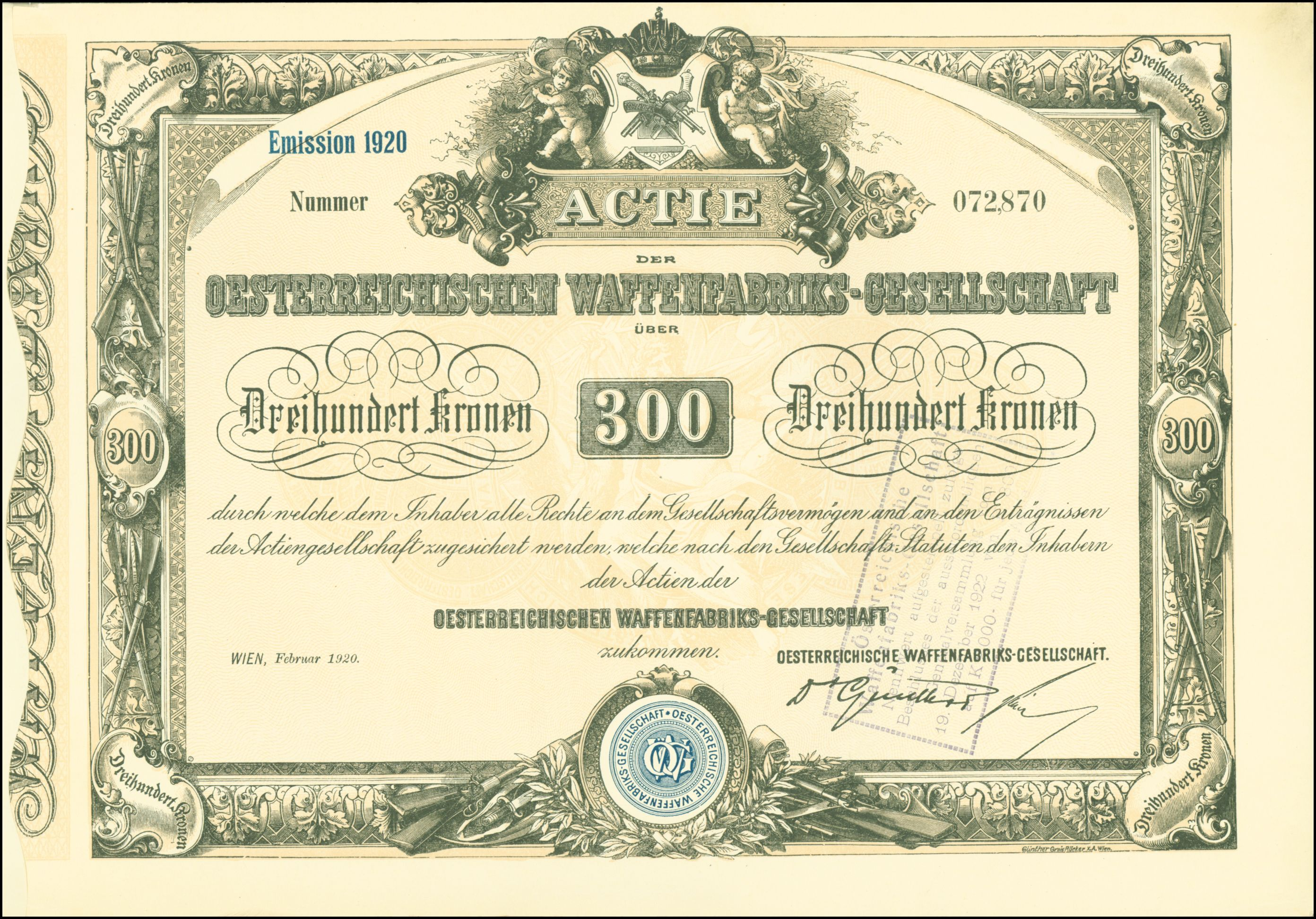
Share of the Oesterreichischen Waffenfabriks-Gesellschaft, issued February 1920

Steyr has been on the "iron road" to the nearby Erzberg mine since the days of the Styrian Otakar dukes and their Babenberg successors in the 12th and 13th century, and has been known as an industrial site for forging weapons. The privilege of iron and steel production, particularly for knives, was renewed by the Habsburg duke Albert of Austria in 1287. After the Thirty Years' War, thousands of muskets, pistols, and carbines were produced annually for the Habsburg Imperial Army.

In 1821, Leopold Werndl (1797–1855), a blacksmith in Steyr, began manufacturing iron parts for weapons. After his father's death, 24-year-old Josef Werndl (1831–1889) took over his factory. On April 16, 1864, he founded the Josef und Franz Werndl & Comp. Waffenfabrik und Sägemühle in Oberletten (Josef and Franz Werndl & Partners Weapons Factory and Sawmill in Oberletten), from which later emerged the Österreichische Waffenfabriksgesellschaft (ŒWG, Austrian Arms-Manufacturing Company), a stock company (AG) since 1869, of which in the future Steyr Arms firearm production was a part. In 1912 Bodencreditanstalt bank became a majority shareholder.

=== World War I ===
Werndl's cooperation with engineer Ferdinand Mannlicher (1848–1904), who had patented an advanced repeating rifle in use by the Austro-Hungarian Army, made ŒWG one of the largest weapon manufacturers in Europe. At the beginning of World War I, with more than 15,000 employees, production output was 4,000 weapons per day.

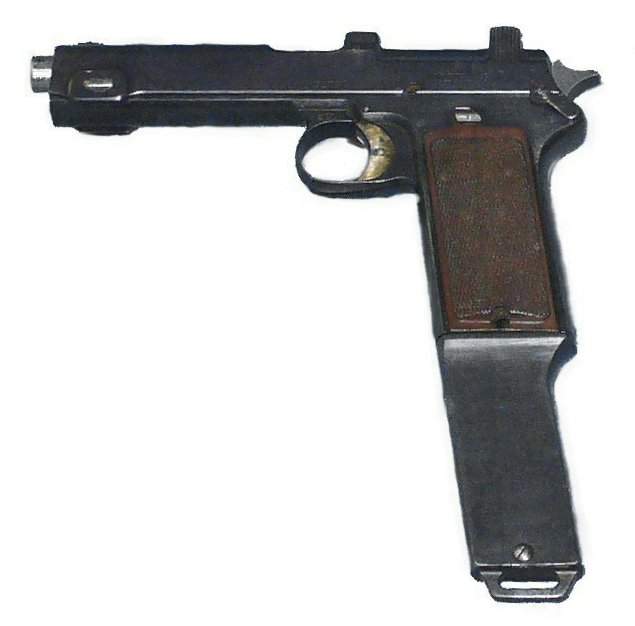
Steyr "Repetierpistole M1912/P16", one of the world's first machine pistols

The company introduced the world's first machine pistol, the Anschlagpistole M.12, during World War I; it was a machine pistol version of the Steyr M1912 pistol, and was manufactured as product model Anschlagspistole M.12. It used a 16-round fixed magazine loaded via 8 round stripper clips, a detachable shoulder stock and a rather large exposed semi-auto/full-auto selector switch on the right side of the frame above the trigger (down = semi & up = full). It fired the 9×23mm Steyr cartridge, with a full-auto rate-of-fire of about 800 to 1,000 rounds per minute (RPM). It weighed about 2.6 pounds. Introduced in 1916, it is considered one of the world's first full-auto capable pistols. Only about 300 Anschlagspistole M.12 were made.

=== Aftermath of World War I ===
After the war, weapons production in Steyr was all but entirely prohibited according to the 1919 Treaty of Saint-Germain, and the company faced bankruptcy. To survive, the ŒWG converted their machinery to concentrate on producing Steyr automobiles under chief designers Hans Ledwinka and Ferdinand Porsche, as well as bicycles (colloquially called Waffenräder (weapon bicycles)). In 1926 the company changed its name to Steyr-Werke, in 1934 to Steyr Daimler Puch. The production of Steyr Daimler Puch weapons continued in cooperation with Patronenfabrik Solothurn AG at Zuchwil in neutral Switzerland.

=== World War II ===
After the Austrian Anschluss to Nazi Germany in 1938, the Steyr factories were incorporated into the Reichswerke Hermann Göring industrial conglomerate and the outbreak of World War II provided a brief revival in weapons production. Like many other companies, Steyr Daimler Puch relied also on forced labour, employing from the Steyr-Münichholz subcamp of KZ Mauthausen.

=== Since 1950s ===
During the 1950s the Mannlicher–Schönauer full stock rifle, designed in 1900, experienced a renaissance. Simultaneously, the re-emergence of the Austrian Armed Forces in the second republican state was the base for new military weapons production.

In 1989, after the partial dissolution of the Steyr Daimler Puch conglomerate, the weapon division was named Steyr Mannlicher in honour of the great Austro-Hungarian engineer Ferdinand Mannlicher. The name remained in place until 2019, now Steyr Arms.

The trade mark Mannlicher is traditionally known for hunting weapons such as the Mannlicher-Schönauer repeating rifle. The company continues to produce hunting weapons.

=== The AUG ===
In the 1970s, Steyr developed an innovative assault rifle, the StG 77. A bullpup design, the StG 77 extensively utilized synthetic materials, and integrated fixed optics. The export version became the Steyr AUG—Armee Universal Gewehr (Universal Army Rifle), eventually used by the armed forces of over 24 countries. It has been prominently featured in films such as Octopussy, Commando, and Die Hard.

== Products ==
Assault rifles

- AUG – bullpup assault rifle
- ACR – experimental flechette rifle
- STM556 – modular assault rifle
- Steyr G62 - upgraded G36

Battle rifles

- StG-58
- DMR 762 - Semi-auto Designated Marksman Rifle

Bolt-action rifles

- M1886 – bolt-action rifle
- M1888 – bolt-action rifle
- M1890 – bolt-action rifle
- M1895 – bolt-action rifle
- Dutch Mannlicher M.95 – bolt-action rifle
- Mannlicher–Schönauer – bolt-action rifle
- Steyr Model 1912 Mauser – bolt-action rifle
- Karabiner 98k - bolt-action rifle
- Steyr SSG 69 – sniper rifle
- Steyr Scout – scout rifle
- Steyr SSG 04 – sniper rifle
- Steyr SSG 08 – sniper rifle
- Steyr HS .50 – anti-materiel rifle
- Steyr IWS 2000 – 15.2 mm anti-materiel rifle

Hunting rifles

- Breeze
- Carbon
- CL II
- Gams
- Monobloc
- SM12
- Scout II
- Steyr Custom
- Pro Varmint
- THB
- Zephyr II

Submachine guns

- MPi 69 (Variant: Steyr MPi 81)
- TMP

Pistols

- M1894 (1894–?)
- M1901 (1901–1903)
- M.7 (1908–1913)
- M1912 (1912–1945)
- SP (1957-1964)
- GB (1981–1988)
- M Series (1999–2026)
- ATc/ATd (2025-present)

Grenade launchers

- GL 40 – side loading 40 mm grenade launcher

== Date codes ==
Steyr Date Code Chart

Steyr pistols are marked with a three-digit date code on the slide just forward of the ejection port. The first letter represents the month of manufacture. The second and third letters represent the last two digits of the year of manufacture.

In this example, the date code "BOY" indicates a pistol manufactured in April 2007.

== See also ==
- Steyr Sport
