= Tanaka-Iga =

Japanese company that produces Buddhist goods

Tanaka-Iga Butsugu (田中伊雅仏具) is a Japanese company that produces Buddhist goods, including butsudan shrines that are placed in many traditional Japanese homes. It is one of the oldest companies on Earth, being founded in the ninth century and operating continuously since. The company produces sophisticated and expensive objects and now uses 3-D computer mock-ups of complex items before production, like the altar and other furniture temples.

== History ==
In approximately 885 C.E. in the Heian period, Tanaka-Iga was founded in Japan. Due to its age, it is the oldest company selling Buddhist religious items. As of 2020, it is based at Manjuji Nishinotoin in Shimogyō-ku, Kyoto. Its 70th-generation president is Masakazu Tanaka.
