= Hino–Komuro pistol =

M1908 Pistol
- Place of origin: Empire of Japan

Production history
- Designer: Hino Kumazo
- Designed: 1903
- Manufacturer: Komuro Juhou Seisakusho
- Produced: 1908–1912
- No. built: 1,200

Specifications
- Caliber: .25 ACP.32 ACP; 8mm Nambu
- Action: Blow-forward
- Feed system: 8–15-round magazine
- Sights: Iron sights

The Hino–Komuro M1908 was a blow-forward operated, semi-automatic pistol of Japanese origin and was patented by Yujiro Komuro.

The designer, Hino Kumazō, was a contemporary of the legendary firearm inventor Murata Tsuneyoshi, and was himself known as a great inventor and an aviation pioneer. Most of the records were lost when Hino's home in Tokyo was fire bombed during World War II.

It was chambered in 8mm Nambu, .32 ACP, and .25 ACP. The 8mm chambering was later dropped, as the cartridge proved too powerful for the design. Roughly 1,200 guns were made between 1908 and 1912.

In December 1992, a cache of 17 Hino–Komuro pistols chambered in .32 ACP were found in a warehouse that are believed to have been stored for 45 years and seven were retained by Japanese authorities for evaluation when the rest were scheduled for destruction as they were not legally registered. As there are only a small number of these weapons, they are considered highly collectible firearms.
