= 7.65×21mm Mannlicher =

Pistol cartridge

7.65mm Mannlicher 7.63 mm Mannlicher
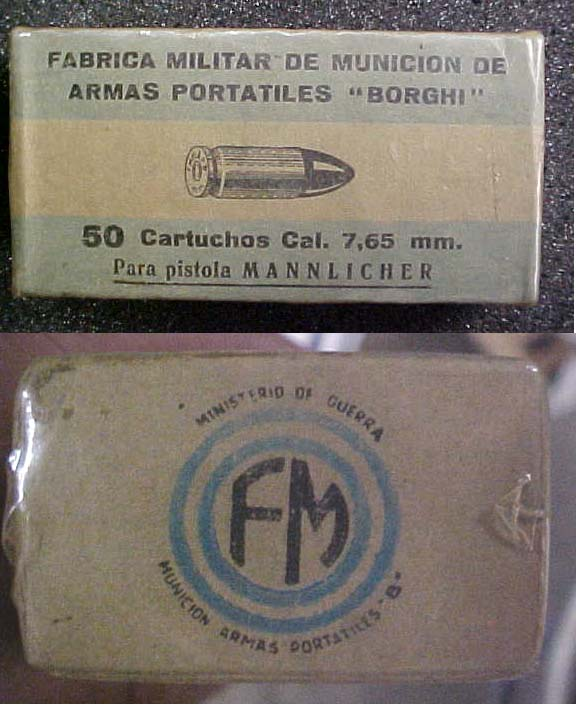
- Type: Pistol
- Place of origin: Austria-Hungary

Production history
- Designed: 1901

Specifications
- Case type: Rimless, straight
- Bullet diameter: .308 in (7.8 mm)
- Neck diameter: .331 in (8.4 mm)
- Base diameter: .332 in (8.4 mm)
- Rim diameter: .334 in (8.5 mm)
- Rim thickness: .030 in (0.76 mm)
- Case length: .84 in (21 mm)
- Overall length: 1.12 in (28 mm)
- Rifling twist: 1 in 10
- Primer type: B

Ballistic performance
Bullet mass/type	Velocity	Energy
85 gr (6 g) FMJ	1,100 ft/s (340 m/s)	227 ft⋅lbf (308 J)
- Source(s): Textbook of Automatic Pistols Note: There is also another 7.63/7.65 mm Mannlicher cartridge, 7.63 mm Mannlicher M.1903 / 7.65 mm Mannlicher M.1896, similar to 7.65 mm Borchardt while 7.63 mm Mannlicher M.1900 / 7.65 mm Mannlicher M.1901 is a straight-case cartridge. The above diameters do not seem to refer to either of them. 7.63 mm Mannlicher M.1900: bullet dia at case mouth 7.82 mm; rim dia 8.85 mm; case bottom dia 8.85 mm; case mouth external dia 8.45 mm; case length 21.00 mm.

The 7.63 mm Mannlicher or 7.65 mm Mannlicher is a centerfire rimless pistol cartridge developed for the Steyr Mannlicher M1901 pistol. This military pistol was rejected by the Austrian Ministry of War, but was often carried as a private weapon by officers. The United Kingdom began manufacturing ammunition when the Mannlicher pistol became popular in South America. Germany began manufacturing ammunition after World War I, but identified the ammunition as 7.65 Mannlicher to differentiate it from the 7.63×25mm Mauser cartridge. This cartridge headspaces on the mouth of the case.
