= 7.5×55mm Swiss =

Swiss rifle cartridge

7.5×55mm GP 11
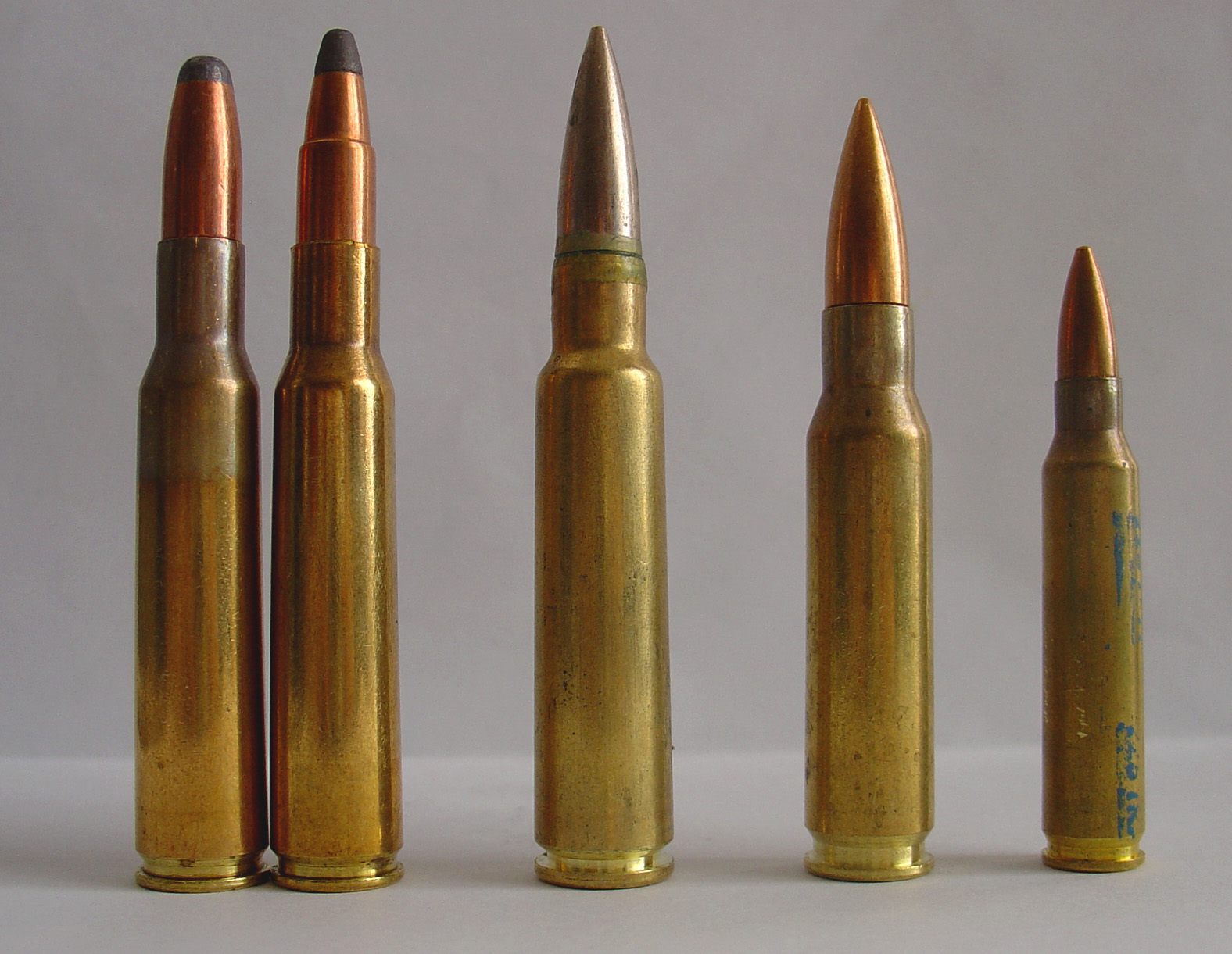
- Two 7×57 cartridges (left) next to a 7.5×55mm / GP 11 (mid), .308 Win (right), and .223 Rem (far right)
- Type: Rifle
- Place of origin: Switzerland

Service history
- In service: 1911–present
- Used by: Switzerland, Israel
- Wars: World War I (Armed neutrality), World War II (Armed neutrality), 1948 Arab–Israeli War

Production history
- Designed: 1911
- Produced: 1911–present
- Variants: Gewehrpatrone 1890, Gewehrpatrone 1890/03, GP 90/23, GP 11

Specifications
- Case type: Rimless, bottleneck
- Bullet diameter: 7.78 mm (0.306 in)
- Land diameter: 7.51 mm (0.296 in)
- Neck diameter: 8.58 mm (0.338 in)
- Shoulder diameter: 11.63 mm (0.458 in)
- Base diameter: 12.64 mm (0.498 in)
- Rim diameter: 12.65 mm (0.498 in)
- Rim thickness: 1.65 mm (0.065 in)
- Case length: 55.60 mm (2.189 in)
- Overall length: 77.70 mm (3.059 in)
- Case capacity: 4.22 cm^{3} (65.1 gr H_{2}O)
- Rifling twist: 270 mm (1 in 10.63 in)
- Primer type: Berdan or boxer large rifle
- Maximum pressure: 380 MPa (55,000 psi)

Ballistic performance
Bullet mass/type	Velocity	Energy
130 gr (8.4 g) SP	3,000 ft/s (910 m/s)	2,608 ft⋅lbf (3,536 J)
150 gr (9.7 g) SP	2,820 ft/s (860 m/s)	2,658 ft⋅lbf (3,604 J)
174 gr (11.3 g) GP 11	2,560 ft/s (780 m/s)	2,535 ft⋅lbf (3,437 J)
180 gr (11.7 g) SP	2,570 ft/s (780 m/s)	2,642 ft⋅lbf (3,582 J)
200 gr (13.0 g) SP	2,460 ft/s (750 m/s)	2,700 ft⋅lbf (3,700 J)

The 7.5×55mm Swiss or 7,5mm GP 11 (or unofficially 7.5×55mm Schmidt–Rubin) is a cartridge developed for the Swiss Army. It originated from the Gewehrpatrone 1890 (7.5×53.5mm) developed in 1889 by mechanical engineer Lt. Col. Eduard Rubin for rifles based on Rudolf Schmidt's action design. The 7.5×55mm Swiss GP 11 cartridge is similar in appearance to the slightly smaller 7.5×54mm French round though the two are not interchangeable.

== History of preceding and related cartridge variants ==
=== Preceding GP 90 and GP 90/03 cartridges ===
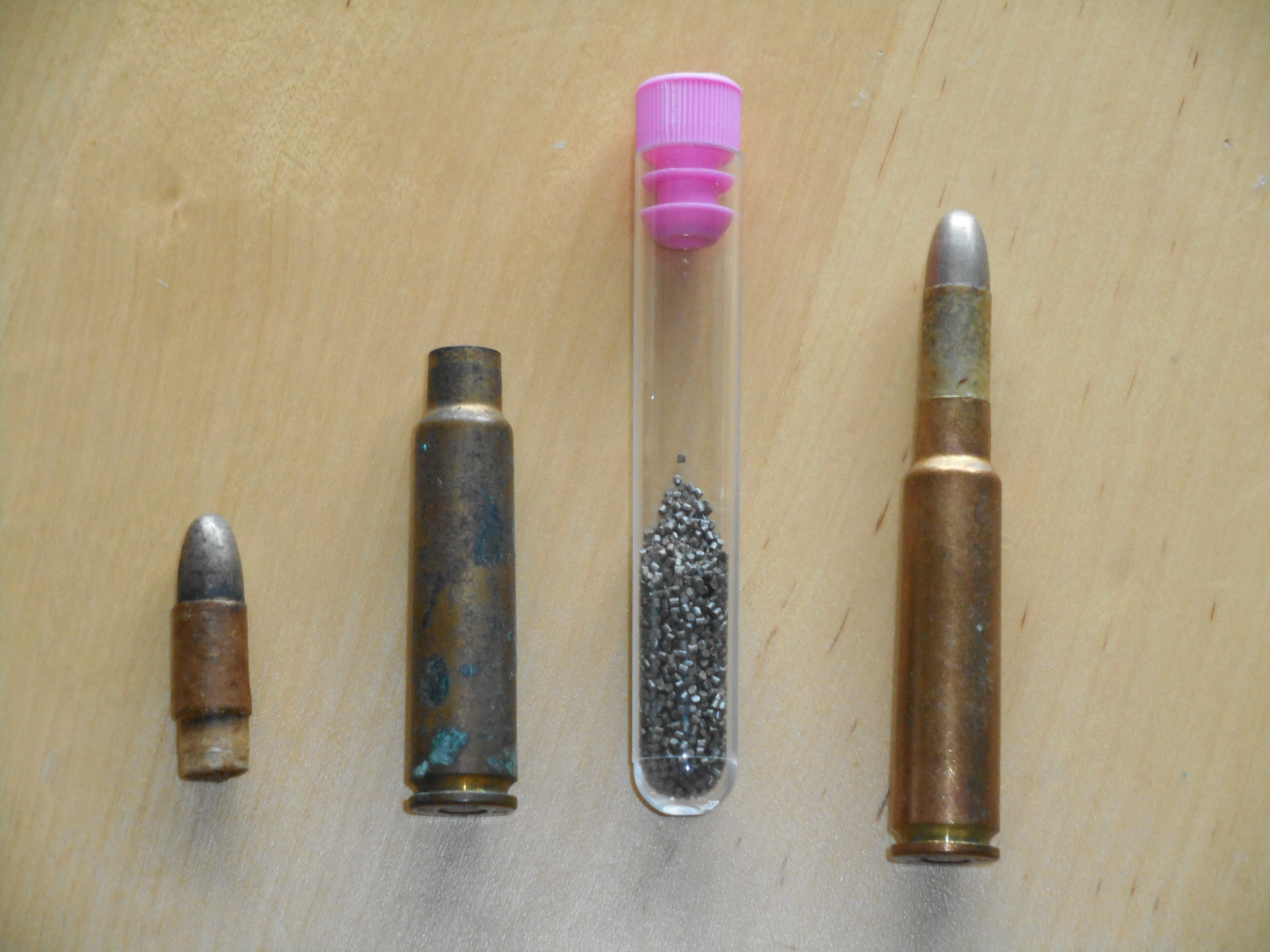
GP 90/03 ammunition

The Gewehrpatrone 1890 cartridge was introduced to Swiss Army service in 1889 for use in the Schmidt–Rubin Model 1889 rifles. The previous generation of the military calibres used in Europe at the time were 10 to 14 mm (and black powder) as opposed to 7.5 mm of the Schmidt–Rubin ammunition, but the transition was underway in late 1880s (e. g., 8×50mmR Lebel was adopted in 1886 and 7.65×53mm Mauser in 1889). It was one of the first with 7.5 mm copper-jacketed rounds similar to those used today. Originally using PC 88 ("powder composition-88") rauchschwacher ("low smoke" - equivalent to "smokeless") cut tubular smokeless single-base powder relying on nitrocellulose as its propellant ingredient, it was known as the Gewehrpatrone 1890. The Gewehrpatrone 1890 round was loaded with a paper-patched lead hollow based heeled steel-capped round-nose bullet. Starting from the rear of the nose section the bullets were wrapped around by two turns of paper, much like cotton patches were placed around the bullet of a musket. This paper patching reduced metallic fouling of the barrel and was supposed to aid in the gas seal of the bullet.

It was discovered that the primer was far too corrosive, so it was updated in 1903 to the Gewehrpatrone 1890/03 cartridge.

=== GP 90/23 cartridge variant for the Model 1889 rifle ===
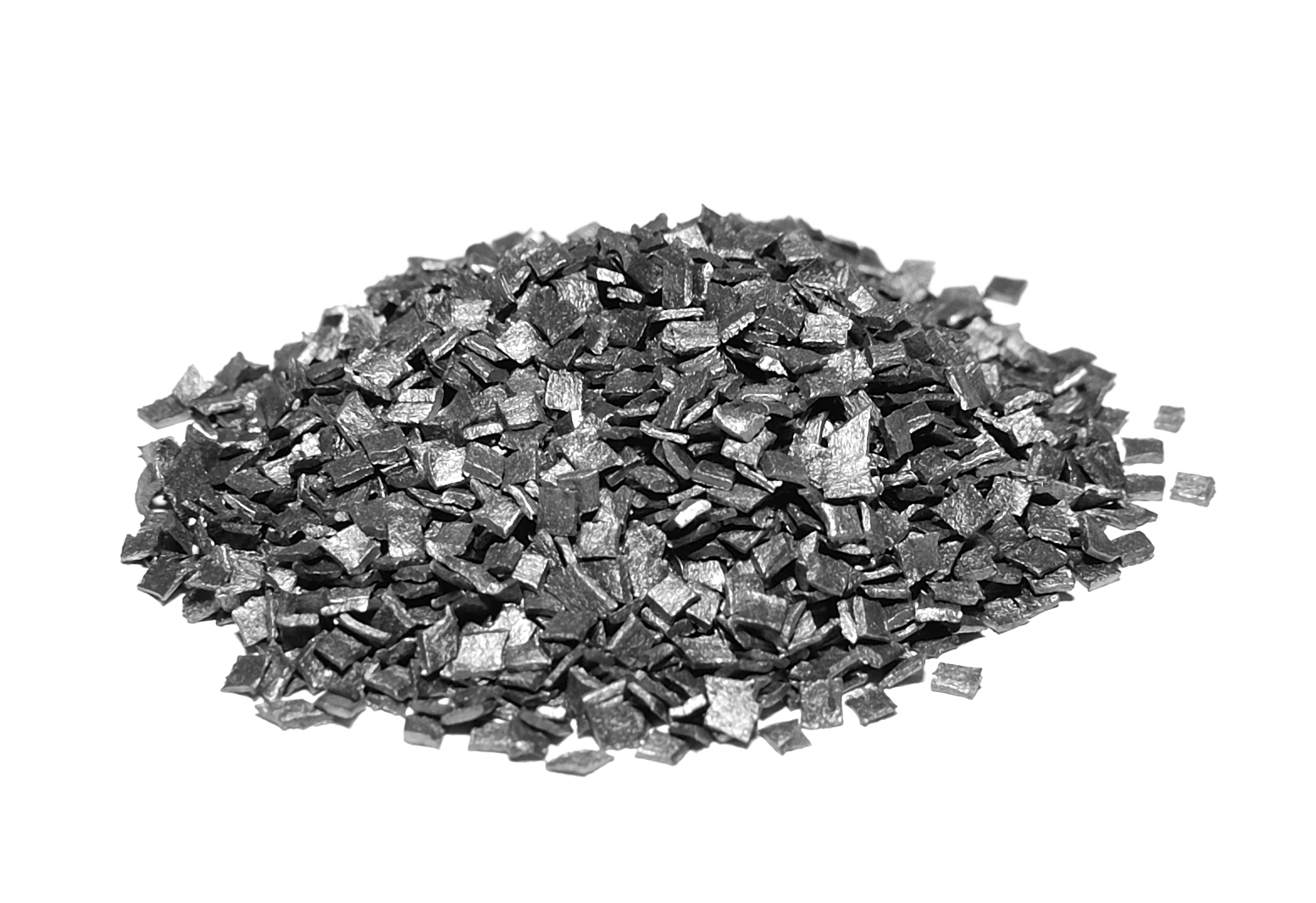
PC 88 square flake shaped propellant used in the GP 90/23 cartridge variant

Long after the discontinuation of the Schmidt–Rubin Model 1889 rifle in the Swiss armed forces, the GP 90/03 cartridge was updated in 1923 and designated the Gewehrpatrone 1890/23 (officially abbreviated GP 90/23 after ca. 1961), for use in shooting competitions. The GP 90/23 was a 7.5×54.5mm round developed to be able to be used in arms chambered for Gewehrpatrone 1890 and GP 11 ammunition. The GP 90/23 operating chamber pressure was slightly higher compared to Gewehrpatrone 1890 ammunition and significantly lower compared to GP 11 ammunition. The GP 90/23 dispensed with the paper patching around the bullet and was loaded with a full metal jacket (FMJ) non-heeled round-nose bullet. The PC 88 propellant shape was changed to square flakes.

Gewehrpatrone 1890, Gewehrpatrone 1890/03 and GP 90/23 ammunition were available in nine different variants.

== GP 11 cartridge ==
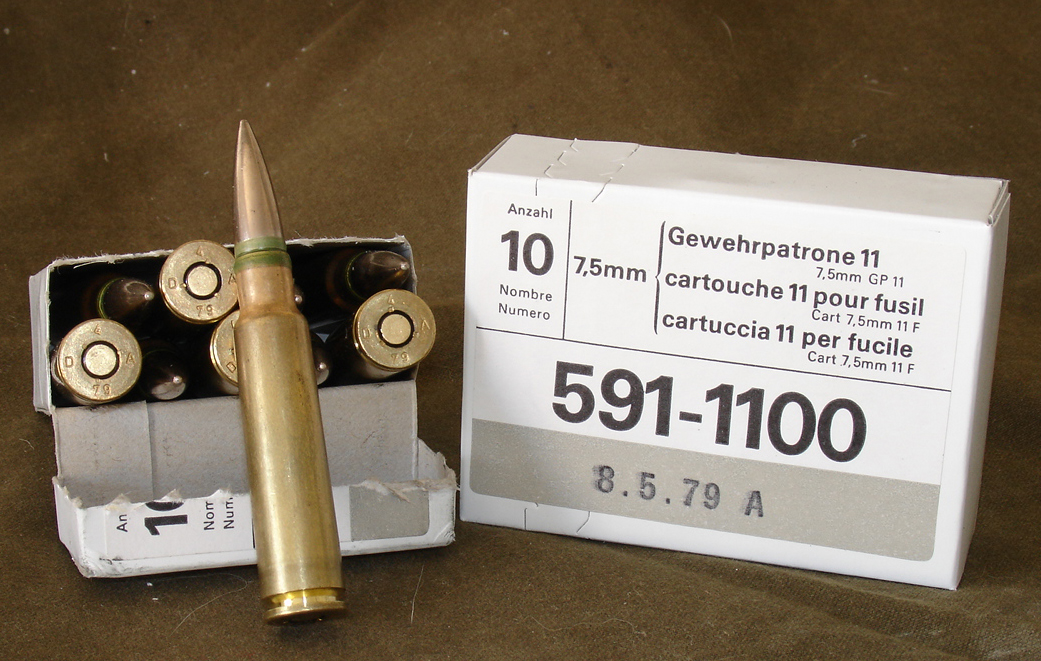
Swiss Army issue 10-round GP 11 pack

In 1911 the metallurgy and bolt design in Swiss military rifles had advanced enough that a more powerful cartridge could be used in the Model 1911 rifles and Schmidt–Rubin 1896/11 rifles. The 7.5mm Swiss round was updated to the completely non-corrosive 7.5×55mm Gewehrpatrone 1911 (GP 11). The bolt thrust of the GP 11 round is relatively high compared to many other service rounds used in the early 20th century. Besides being used in the Model 1911 and Schmidt–Rubin 1896/11 rifles, GP 11 ammunition was also used in the MG 11 machine gun, K11 and K31 carbines as well as in the Stgw 57 battle rifles. The cartridge saw extensive service until the early 1990s with the standard rifles of Swiss servicemen, and still sees use by Swiss Army reservists and sport shooters, of which there are many. Furthermore, it is still the standard ammunition for the MG 51 general purpose machine gun used on many Swiss armored vehicles, such as the Pz 87 "Leopard 2" tank and the MOWAG Eagle reconnaissance vehicle. In this role, it is usually belt fed with GP 11 full metal jacket and GP 11 tracer rounds.

The GP 11 cartridge used double-base powder combining nitrocellulose (gun cotton) with about 30% nitroglycerin as propellants and is loaded to a significantly higher operating chamber pressure compared to GP 90 ammunition. The 11.3-gram (174.4 gr) full metal jacket GP 11 boat tail spitzer bullet was when adopted an innovative bullet design. The GP 11 bullet contained a lead-antimony core and its jacket was made of plated steel or tombac. Depending on the year of production the plating was made of copper, brass, nickel or copper-nickel. The GP 11 cartridge cases were made of brass (72% of copper and 28% zinc) or, from May 1943 to January 1947, due to supply shortages in Switzerland, of aluminum or steel. The GP 11 bullet offered good aerodynamic efficiency and ballistic performance with a ballistic coefficient (G1 BC) of 0.505 to 0.514. At 780 m/s (2,559 ft/s) muzzle velocity the standard GP 11 ball bullet retained supersonic velocity up to 800 m (874.9 yd) (V_{800} ≈ Mach 1.1) under ICAO Standard Atmosphere conditions at sea level (air density ρ = 1.225 kg/m^{3}). Even by 2023 standards, 800 m (875 yd) typical effective range is quite remarkable for a standard military rifle round that is more than a century old.

Maximum range with the GP 11 under Swiss chosen atmospheric conditions (altitude = 800 m (2,625 ft), air pressure = 694 mm (27.32 in) Hg, temperature = 7 °C (45 °F)) equaling ICAO Standard Atmosphere conditions at 653.2 m (2,143 ft) (air density ρ = 1.150 g/m^{3}) is acquired when the barrel is elevated 37° and is muzzle velocity dependent.

Muzzle velocity	Maximum range
760 m/s (2,493 ft/s)	5,000 m (5,468 yd)
780 m/s (2,559 ft/s)	5,500 m (6,015 yd)
810 m/s (2,657 ft/s)	5,800 m (6,343 yd)

The GP 11 bullet set off the militaries of countries like Germany, the United States and the United Kingdom at the onset of and after World War I to develop and field similar full metal jacket boat tail spitzer bullets to improve the maximum useful range and long-range performance of the full metal jacket flat-based spitzer bullet designs they used. The useful maximum range is defined by the maximum range of a small-arms projectile while still maintaining the minimum kinetic energy required to put unprotected personnel out of action, which is generally believed to be 15 kilogram-meters (147 J / 108 ft⋅lbf).

Since its introduction in 1911 the GP 11 cartridge featured some technical development. The projectile-seating in the cartridge case neck was improved by adding a cannelure on the bullet and crimping the case neck over time, resulting in 30 kgf (66 lbf) (1911), 50 kgf (110 lbf) (1929 modification), 100 kgf (220 lbf) (1942 modification) extraction force. In 1942 the square flake-shaped double-base propellant was replaced by tubular shaped double-base propellant. Further, there were minor developments regarding the projectiles, sealing and primers. GP 11 cartridges were mass-produced for the Swiss military in the ammunition factories in Altdorf and in Thun until 1994. The last 1994 produced ammunition had lot No. 349-94. Previously GP 11 was also produced in Rotenburg and Solothurn as other municipalities in Switzerland. In 2016 GP 11 production was resumed by RUAG to fulfill Swiss military needs.

GP 11 is regarded as highly accurate and well-manufactured service ammunition. For Swiss military service ammunition the primer-type is Berdan. Berdan-primed ammunition is not easy for reloading previously fired cartridges.

In addition to the standard full metal jacket GP 11 rounds, specialty rounds were produced as well for the Swiss military. Armor-piercing steel-core rounds can be identified by their violet bases. These rounds can easily pierce 5 mm (0.2 in) of steel plate at 500 m (550 yards). Tracer rounds burn out to 800 m (875 yards), and can be identified by their red tips.

When all modifications are combined GP 11 ammunition was available in a total of 40 different versions.

== Specifications ==
=== Variants overview ===
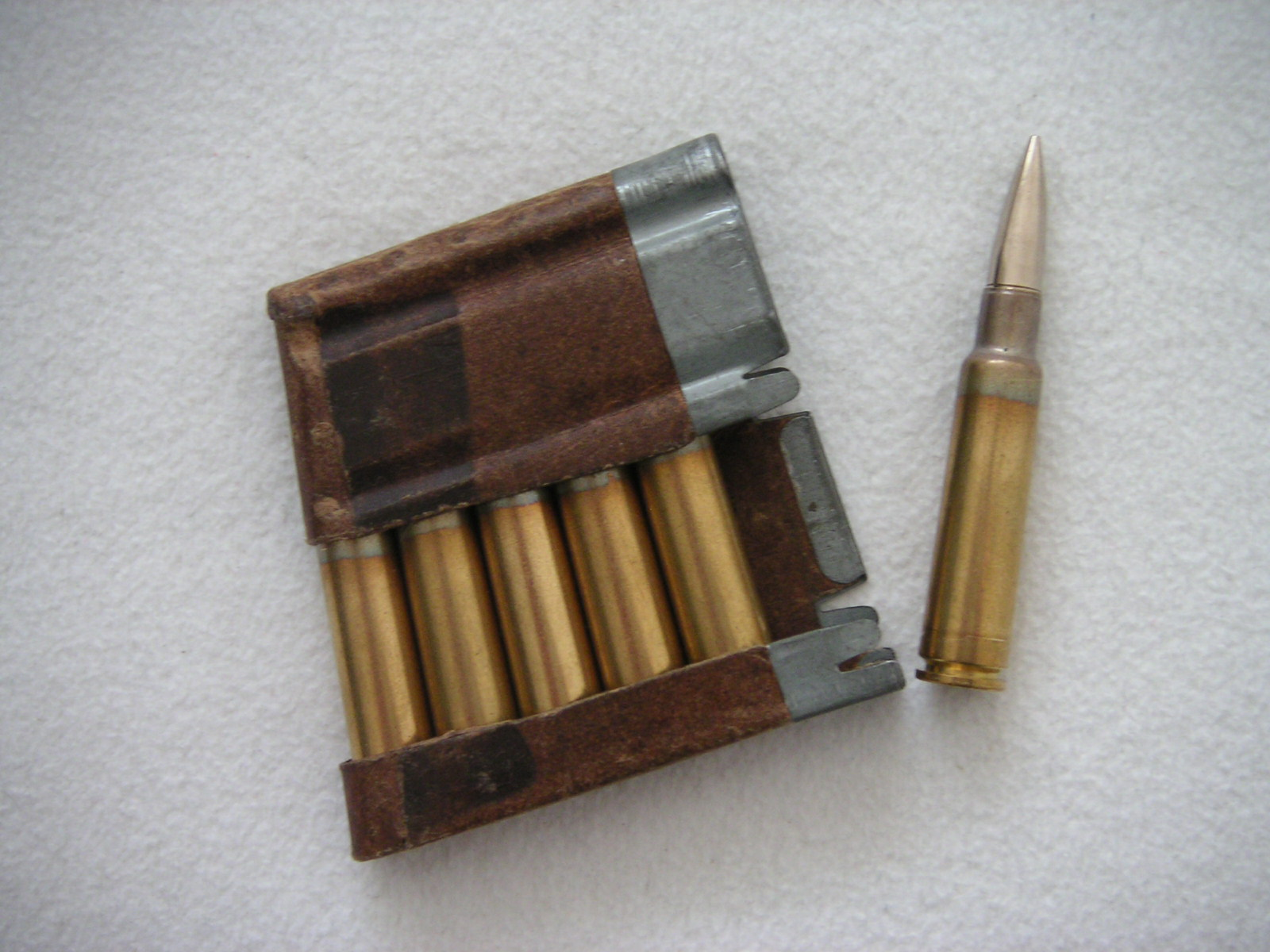
Stripper clip with 7.5×55mm Swiss GP 11 cartridges

	Gewehrpatrone 1890	Gewehrpatrone 1890/03	GP 90/23	GP 11
Cartridge	7.5×53.5mm	7.5×53.5mm	7.5×54.5mm	7.5×55mm
Case length	2.106 in	2.106 in	2.15 in	2.185 in
Rim diameter	0.492 in	0.492 in	0.5 in	0.496 in
Head diameter	0.488 in	0.488 in	0.496 in	0.493 in
Neck diameter (w/ paper patch)	0.362 in (0.362 in)	0.362 in (0.335 in)	0.328 in	0.334 in
Bullet	211 gr	211 gr	190 gr	174 gr
Bullet diameter (w/ paper patch)	0.3028 in (0.3075 in)	0.3028 in (0.3086 in)	0.3075 in	0.306 in
Bullet length	1.14 in	1.14 in	1.165 in	1.378 in
Muzzle velocity	1968 ft/s	1980 ft/s	2050 ft/s	2560 ft/s
Powder measure	27-31 gr smokeless	31 gr smokeless	33.7 gr smokeless	49.35 gr smokeless
Max. service load chamber pressure (Swiss standards)	36,970 psi	36,970 psi	38,390 psi	45,500 psi

Due to the greater pressures produced by the GP 11 rounds, they are not safe to be fired in Model 1889 Schmidt–Rubin rifles which have bore diameters of 0.305 - 0.306".

=== 7.5×55mm Swiss / GP 11 ===
The 7.5×55mm Swiss / GP 11 cartridge (designated as the 7.5 × 55 Suisse by the C.I.P.) has 4.22 ml (65 grains) H_{2}O cartridge case capacity. The exterior shape of the case was designed to promote reliable case feeding and extraction in bolt-action rifles and machine guns alike, under extreme conditions.

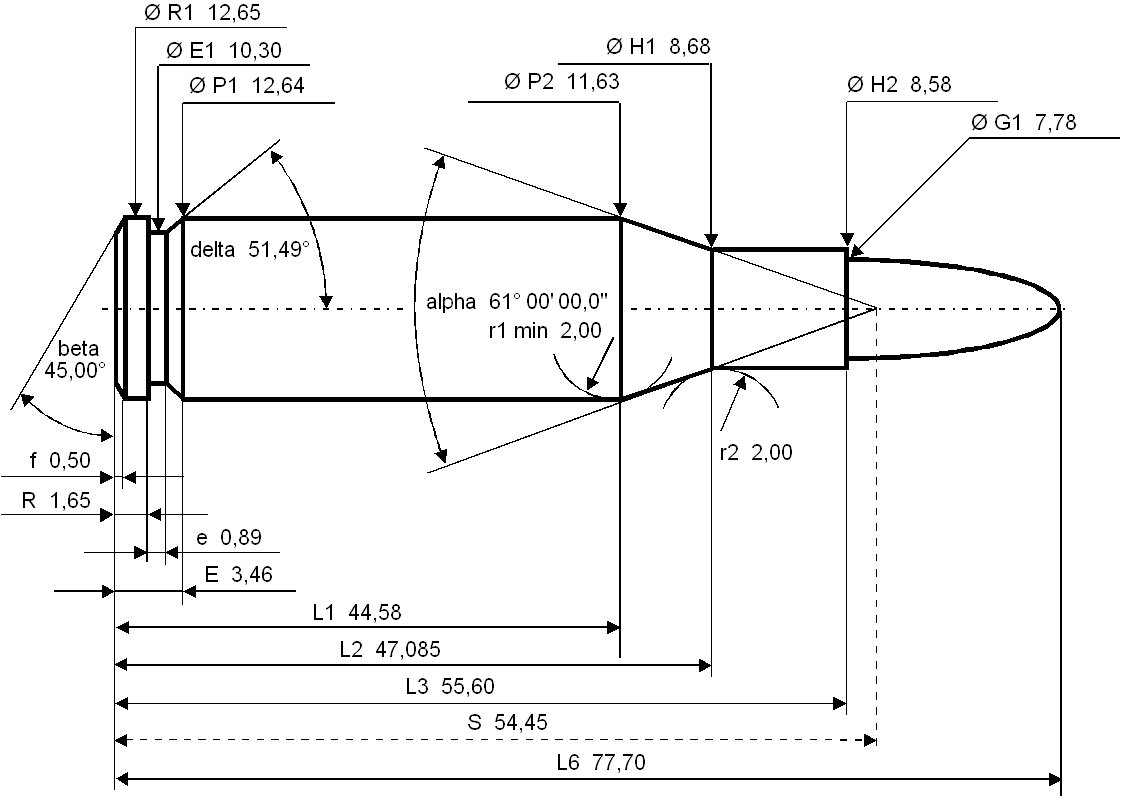

7.5×55mm Swiss / GP 11 maximum C.I.P. cartridge dimensions. All sizes in millimeters (mm).

Americans would define the shoulder angle at alpha/2 ≈ 30.5 degrees. The common rifling twist rate for this cartridge is 270 mm (1 in 10.63 in), 4 grooves, Ø lands = 7.51 mm (0.296 in), Ø grooves = 7.77 mm (0.306 in), land width = 3.75 mm (0.148 in), and the primer type is Berdan or large rifle.

According to the official Commission Internationale Permanente pour l'Epreuve des Armes à Feu Portatives (C.I.P.) rulings, the 7.5×55mm Swiss can handle up to 380.00 MPa (55,114 psi) P_{max} piezo pressure. In C.I.P. regulated countries every rifle cartridge combo has to be proofed at 125% of this maximum C.I.P. pressure to certify for sale to consumers. This means that 7.5×55mm Swiss / GP 11 chambered arms in C.I.P. regulated countries are currently (2016) proof tested at 475.00 MPa (68,893 psi) PE piezo pressure.

Switzerland is not a C.I.P. member state and therefore does not recognize any C.I.P. rulings and proofed its military 7.5×55mm rifles chambered in the GP 11 version of their service cartridge at 150% of the GP 11 load pressure of 313.717 MPa (45,500 psi). This means a Swiss military proof test would be executed at 1.5 * 313.717 = 470.57 MPa (68,250 psi) and a C.I.P. proof test would be executed at 1.25 * 380 = 475 MPa (68,892 psi). Swiss 7.5×55mm GP 11 proof tests are therefore not recognized in C.I.P. member states in their turn.

== Civilian use ==
Due to the uncommon 12.72 mm (0.501 in) diameter bolt face the 7.5×55mm Swiss GP 11 was and is rarely chambered in civilian target or hunting guns made outside Switzerland.

Due to the availability of surplus K31 rifles on the civilian market, a number of cartridge manufacturers, such as Prvi Partizan, produce 7.5×55mm GP 11-like rounds in full metal jacket, soft-tip, and ballistic tip configurations. Civilian manufacturers also produce similar cartridge cases with Boxer large rifle primers for easier reloading.

=== Reloading ===
Despite its nomenclature, the 7.5×55mm Swiss designed for 7.78 mm (0.306 in) bullets can use the same 7.62 mm (.308 in) bullets as in well known .308 Winchester a.k.a. 7.62x51mm NATO and .30-06 Springfield cartridges, all of which have very slightly wider land and groove diameters. This allows for ease of handloading and custom competition or hunting loads, as nearly any .308 diameter bullet may be used. However, most Swiss match shooters use standard GP 11 military ammunition, a testament to the quality of the factory loading of the GP 11 round.

While the scarcity of reloadable cartridge cases previously made the 7.5×55mm Swiss problematic for US shooters, reloadable cases are easily produced by reforming .284 Winchester brass. Case rims are slightly undersized (12.01mm vs. 12.65mm), but this presents no problems so long as the rifle's extractor is in good condition. This allows the handloader to produce a GP90/23 load that is safe for the Schmidt–Rubin Model 1889 rifle. Prvi Partizan has been producing newly made brass for reloaders as well as loaded ammunition so supplies of reloadable brass are less difficult to obtain.

== Use ==
The list of rifles that are using the GP11 cartridge.

=== Weapons still in service ===
==== Machine gun ====
The MG 51 remains in service on the Swiss CV90 (Spz 2000) and the Leopard 2 (Panzer 87 WE).

=== Retired systems ===
==== Service rifle ====
- Schmidt–Rubin, a straight-pull bolt action infantry rifle:
  - Earlier variant of the Schmidt-Rubin model 1889/96 upgraded to the Schmidt-Rubin 1896/11 rifle standard to shoot the GP11.
  - Model 1911, the production of the earlier variant but in GP11 continued.
  - K11 - Model 1911 carbine, it is a shorter rifle that replaced the short rifle and the cavalry rifle.
- Schmidt–Rubin Karabiner K31, a magazine-fed, straight-pull bolt-action infantry rifle (1933 until 1958).
- SIG SG 510

==== Precision rifle ====
- Schmidt–Rubin Zf. Kar. 55, a modified K31 rifle, equipped with a 3.5×23 telescopic sight made by Kern.
- SIG SG 510-4 equipped with a Kern & Co Aarau 4×24 telescopic sight.

==== Machine gun ====
- MG 11, a heavy machine gun, based on the water-cooled Maxim machine gun manufactured by W+F Bern under licence.
- Flieger MG 29, an aircraft mounted machine gun, later used as an anti-air weapon, and also mounted on the Panzer 58 tank before being retired.
- Reibel Pz Mg 38 that was rechambered, and was installed on light tank in the Swiss Army.
- Furrer Lmg 25, a light machine gun, produced from 1925 until the 1960s.

=== Civilian weapons ===
- LUVO Arms LA-11, a Czech rifle that can receive the magazines of the SIG SG 510. It is based on an AR-10 design.

=== Prototypes ===
- SIG Mondragón M1908, Mexican service rifle, with prototypes in GP11.
- The AK44 is a copy of the SVT-40, it was a project of the W+F Bern to aiming to equip the troop with a semi-automatic weapon. It was never adopted.
- W+F Bern StG.54, a competitor to the SIG SG 510 for the selection of the successor to the K31.

== Gallery ==
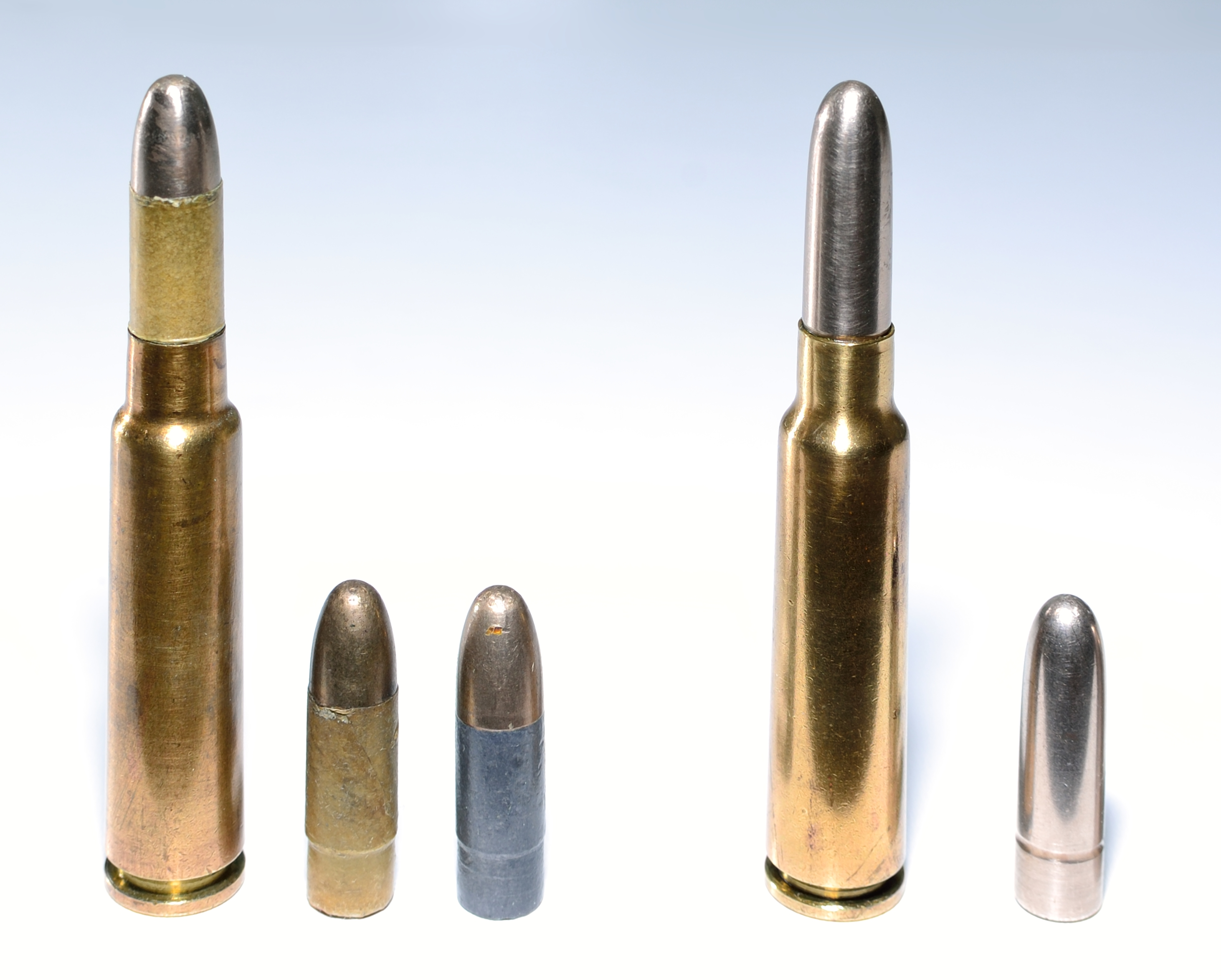
Gewehrpatrone 1890 paper patched (left) and GP90/23 ammunition

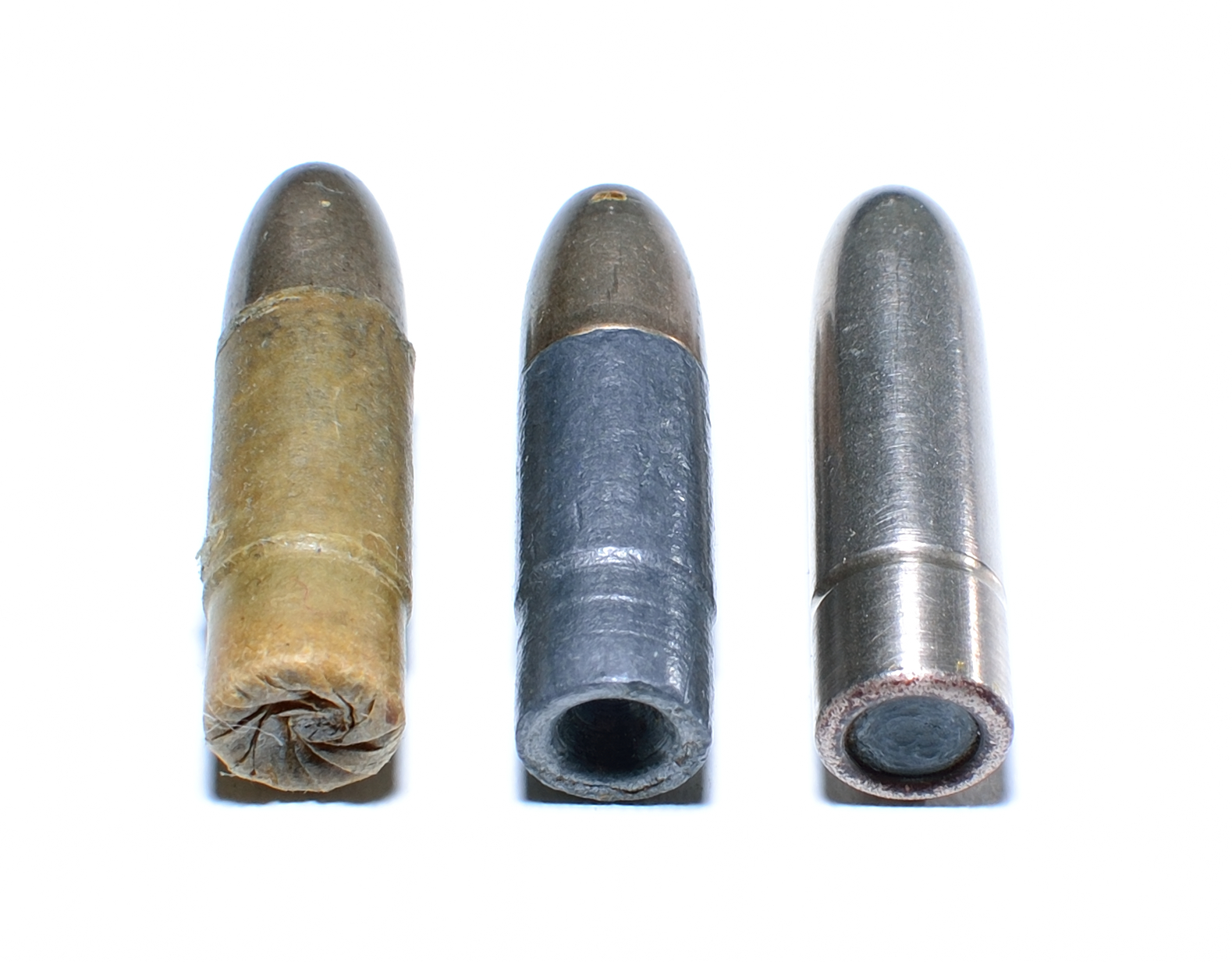
Gewehrpatrone 1890 and GP90/23 ball projectiles

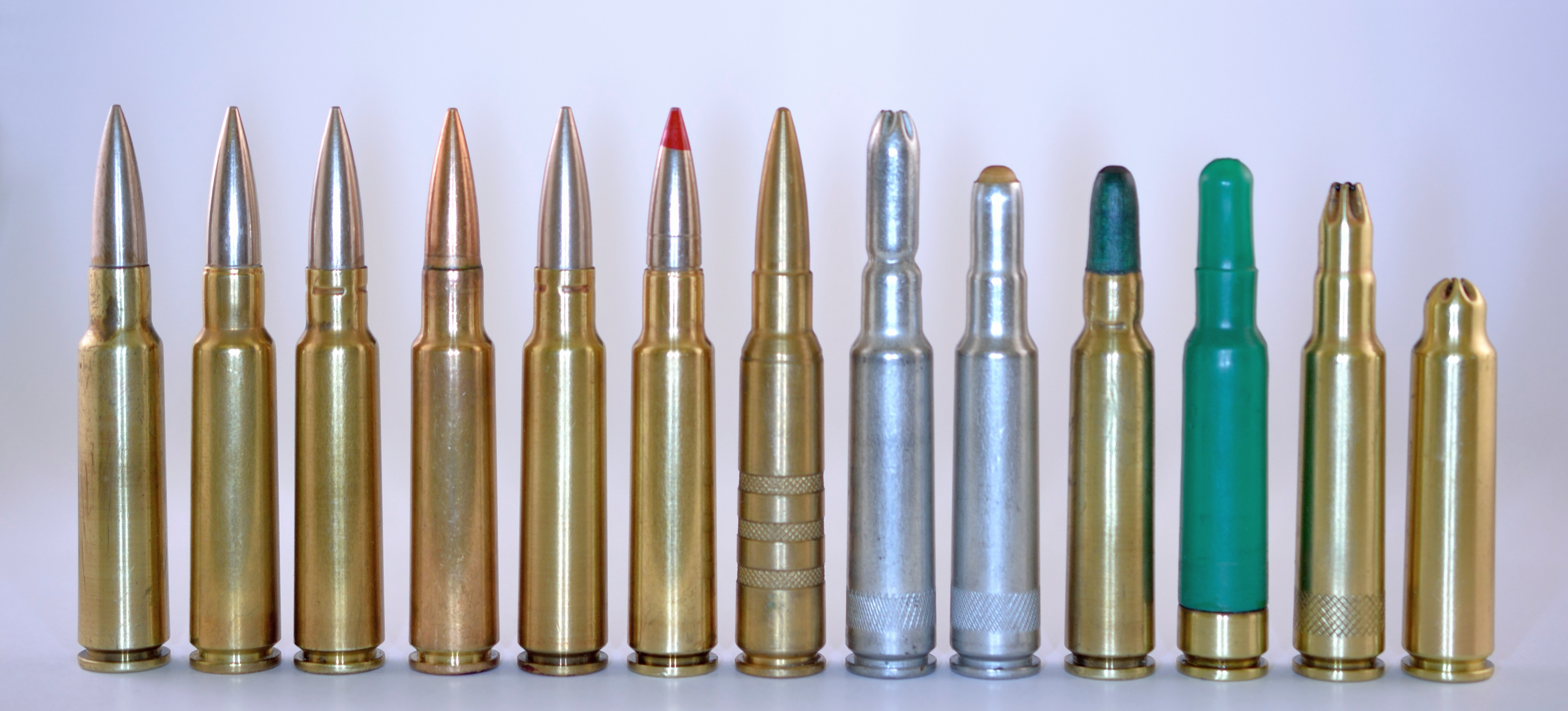
7,5mm ammunition variants

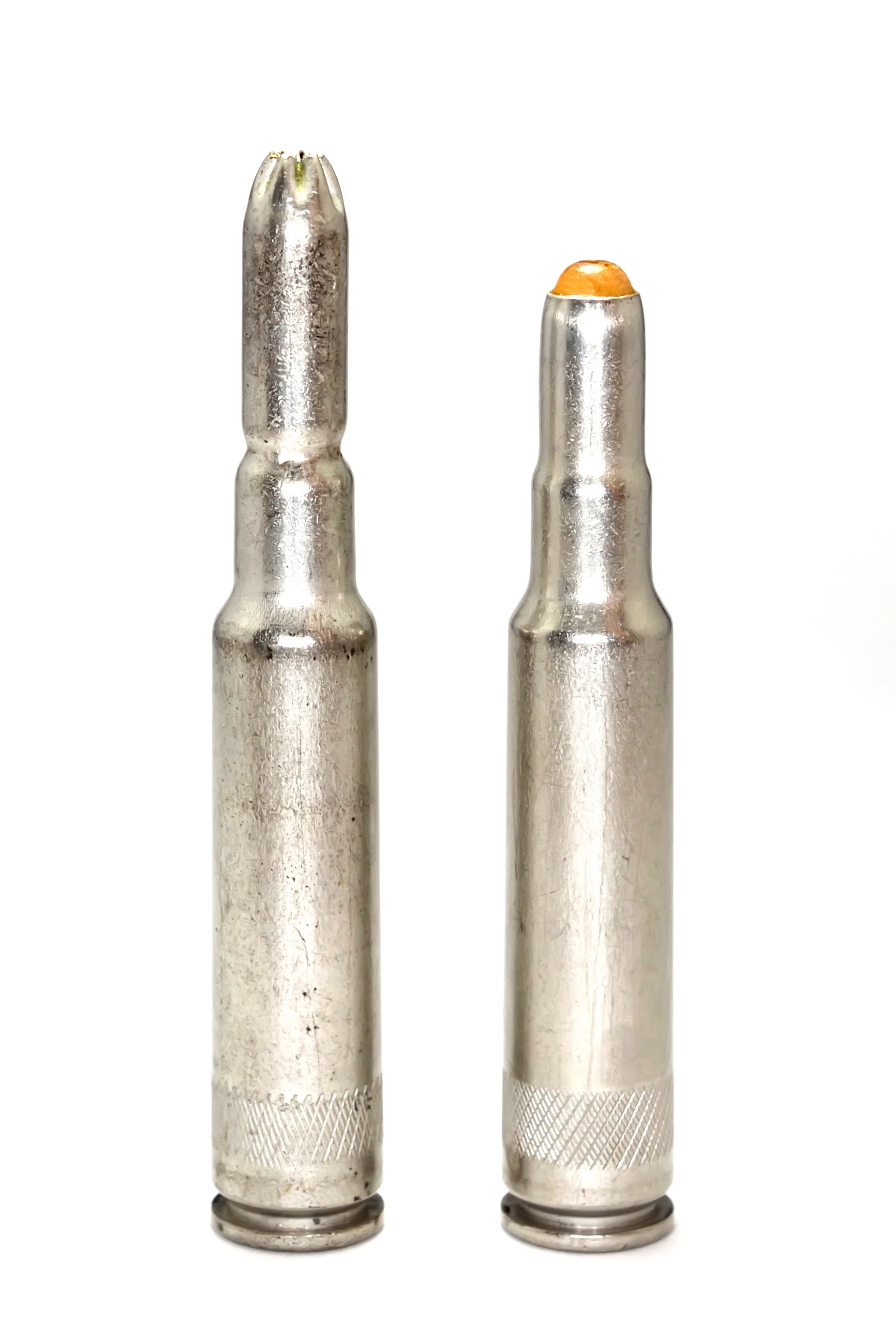
Gw. Treib-Pat. 44 grenade-launching cartridge

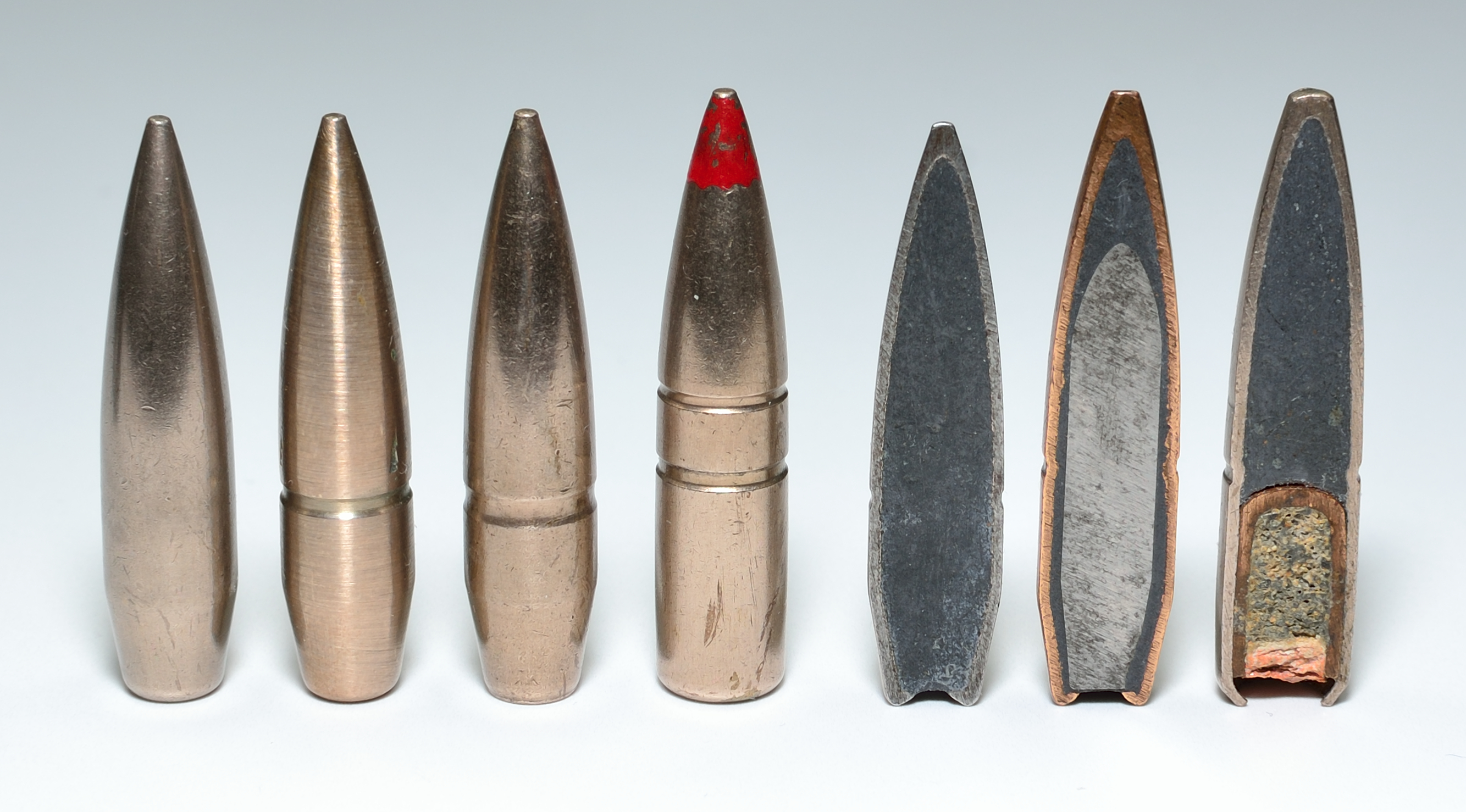
GP 11 full metal jacket, armor-piercing and tracer projectiles

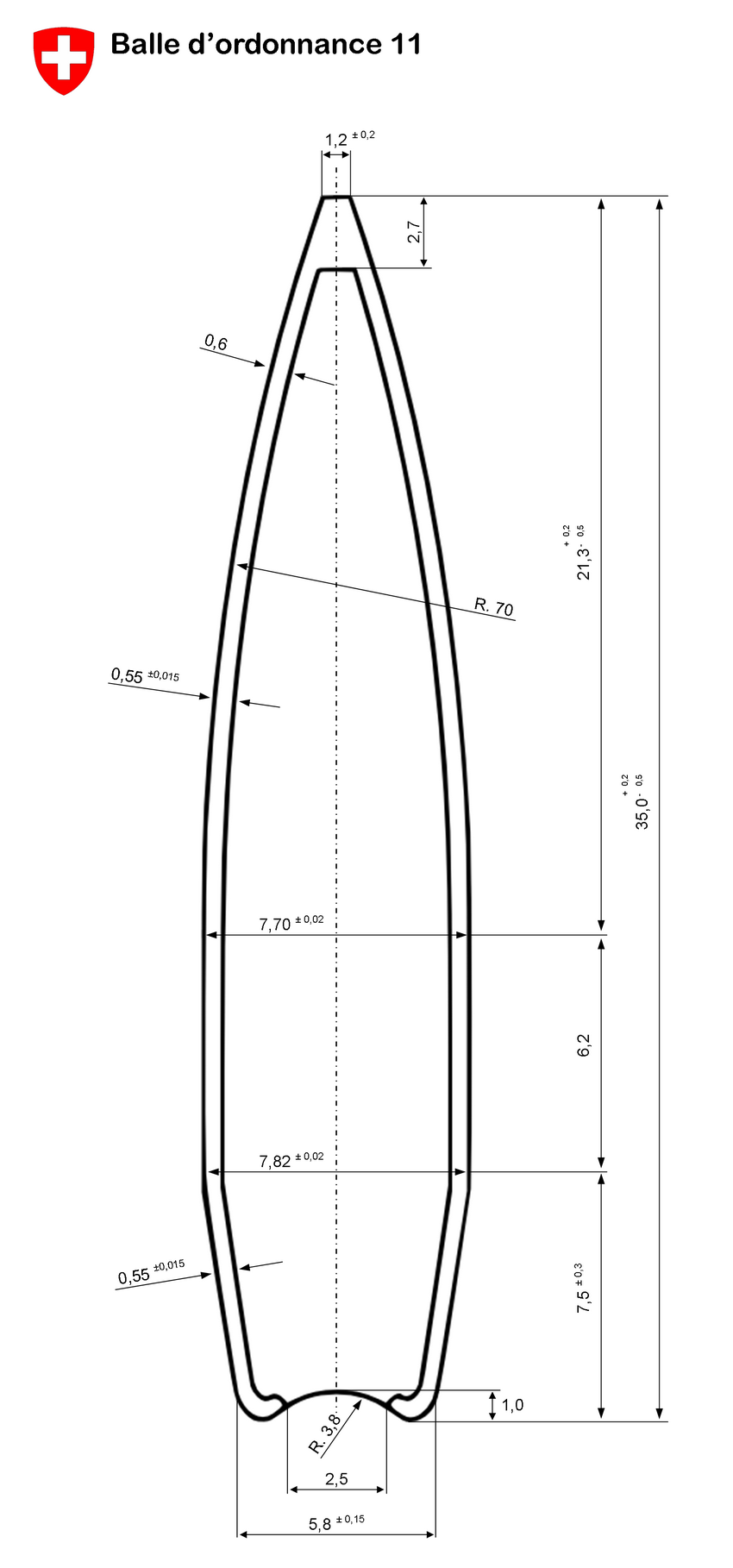
GP 11 ball projectile

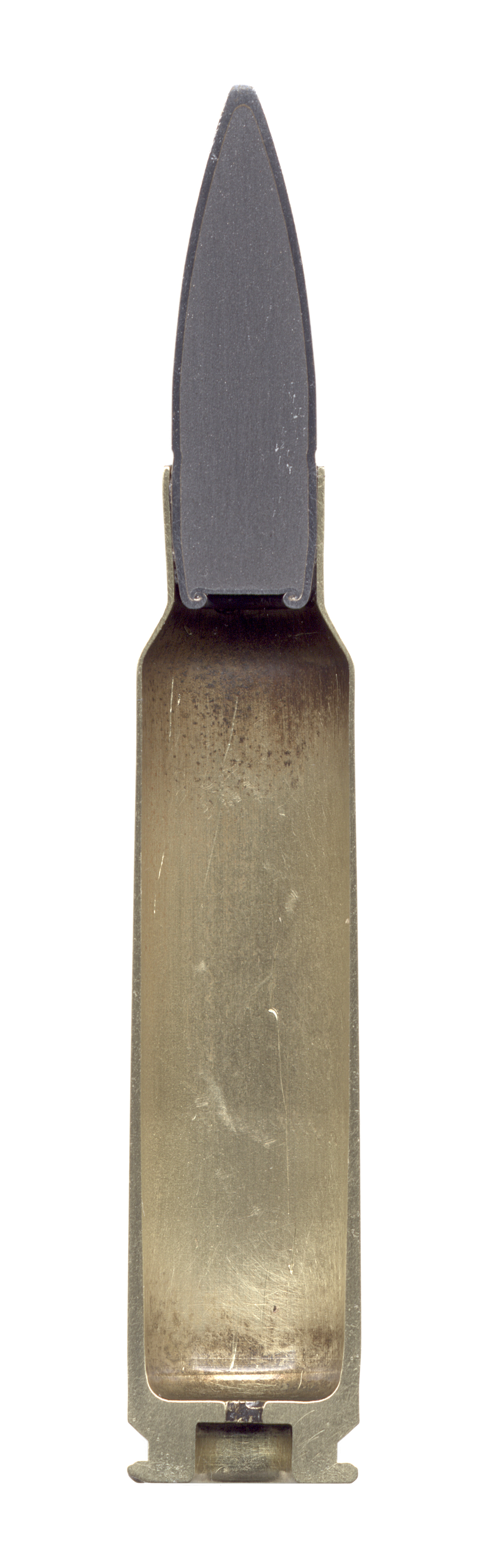
Boxer primer compatible cross sectioned 7.5×55mm Swiss round

== See also ==
- List of rifle cartridges
- Table of handgun and rifle cartridges
- 7 mm caliber

== Bibliography ==
- C.I.P. CD-ROM edition 2003
- C.I.P. decisions, texts and tables (free current C.I.P. CD-ROM version download (ZIP and RAR format))
