= MG 11 =

Maschinengewehr Modell 1911 (MG 11)
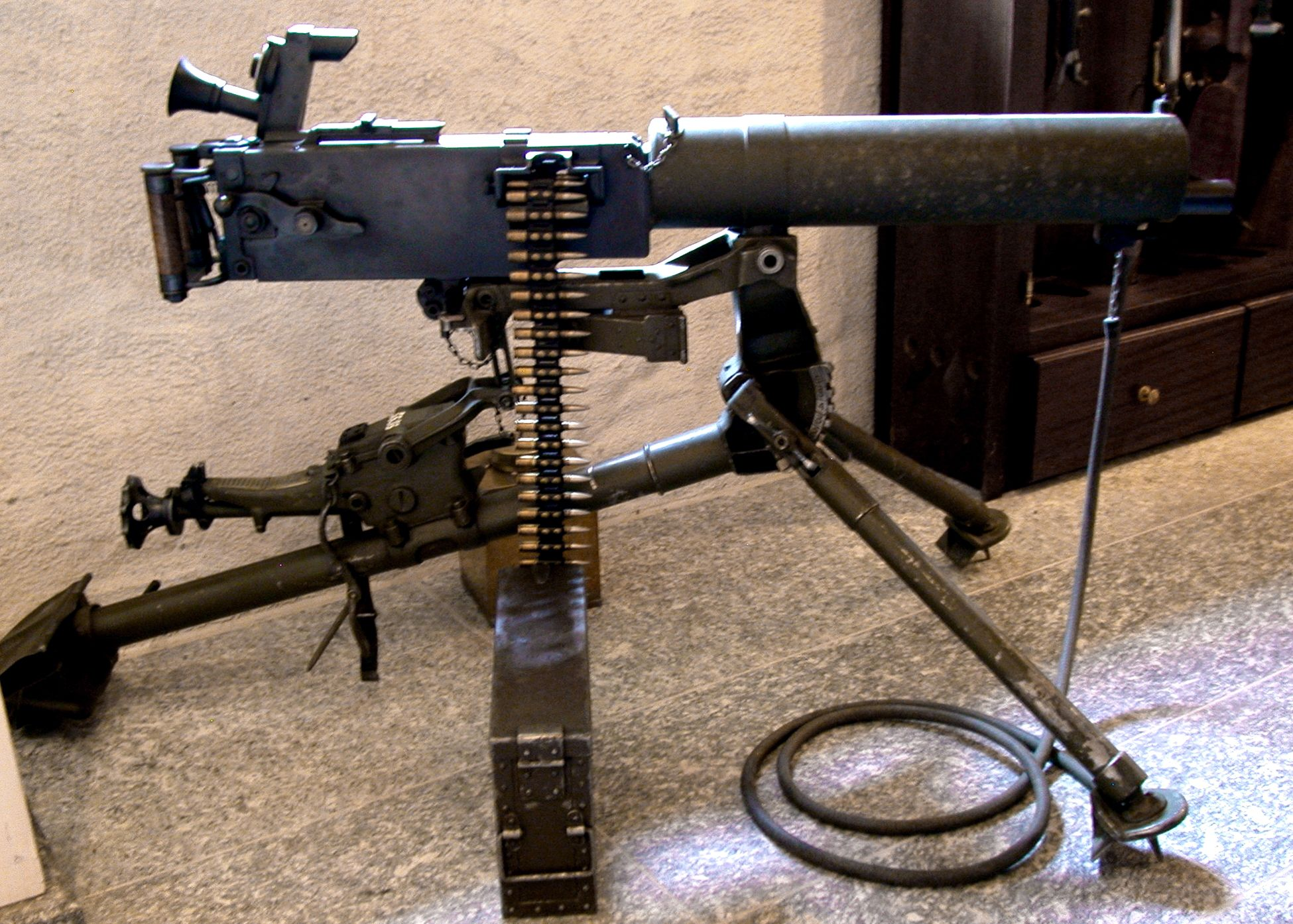
- MG 11 (revisions 1934/1935 variant) mounted on its tripod
- Type: Heavy machine gun
- Place of origin: Switzerland

Service history
- In service: 1911–1980s
- Used by: Swiss Army

Production history
- Designer: Hiram Maxim / Waffenfabrik Bern
- Designed: 1911
- Manufacturer: Waffenfabrik Bern
- Produced: 1911–1946
- No. built: 10,000^{+}
- Variants: MG 11 revisions 1934/1935

Specifications
- Mass: 18.7 kg (41.23 lb) (without tripod)
- Length: 1,100 mm (43.3 in)
- Barrel length: 721 mm (28.4 in)
- Cartridge: 7.5x55mm Swiss GP 11
- Caliber: 7.5 mm
- Action: Short recoil, toggle locked
- Rate of fire: 500 rounds per minute
- Muzzle velocity: 750 m/s (2,460 ft/s)
- Feed system: Canvas and metal links belt
- Sights: Iron sights optical sight

The Maschinengewehr Modell 1911 or MG 11 is a Swiss heavy machine gun which was introduced before and during World War I. The MG 11 has a close constructive relationship with the German MG 08 heavy machine gun.

== History ==
The MG 11 was based on the water-cooled Maxim machine gun, which had been developed by Hiram Stevens Maxim in 1885. The MG 11 was the last of a series of Swiss derivatives of the Maxim machine gun.

=== 7.5 mm Maschinengewehr Modells ===
==== 1894 (MG 94) ====
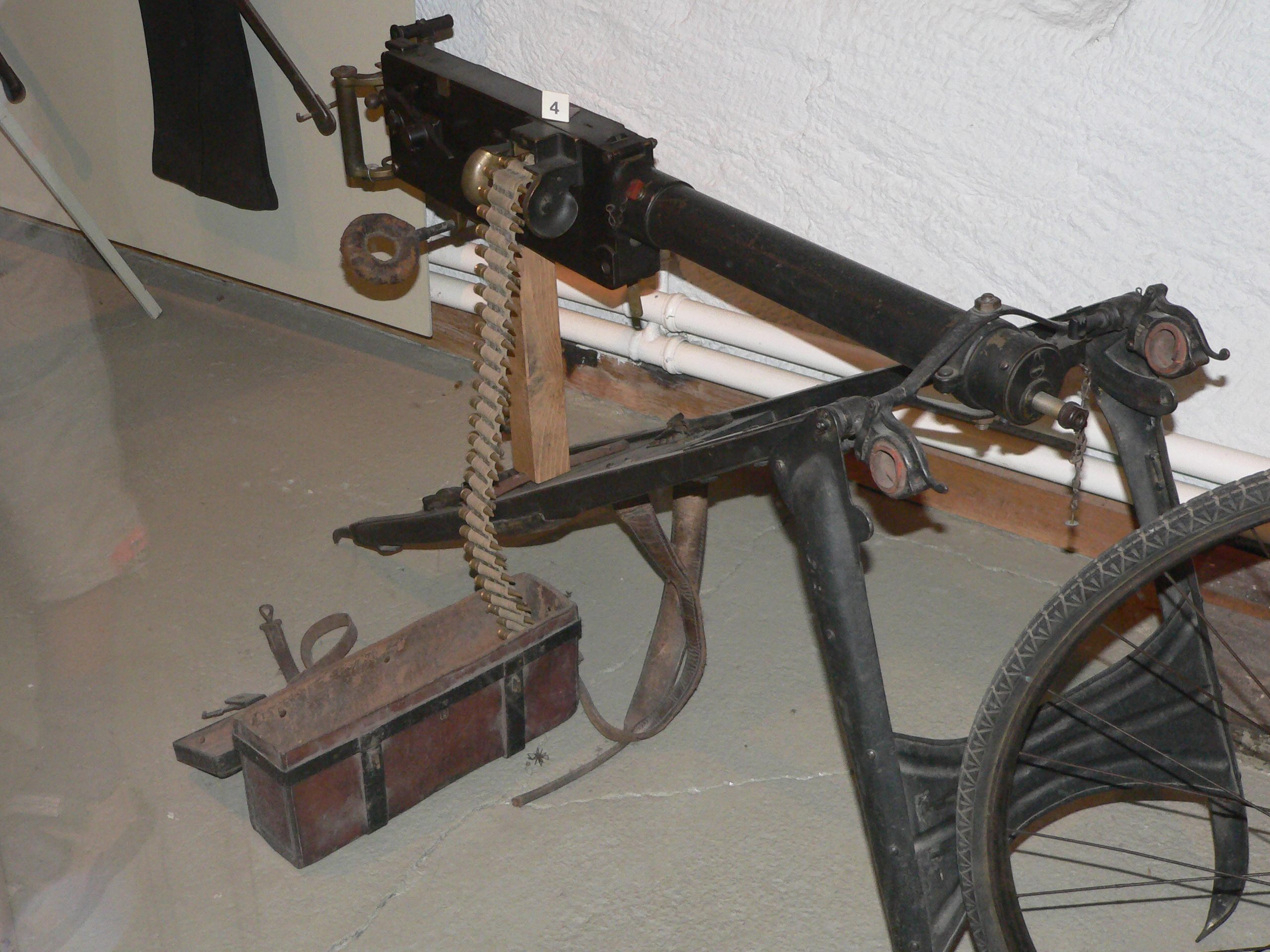
Maschinengewehr Modell 1894 on its knee mount.

Between 1891 and 1894 Switzerland procured 72 heavy machine guns, designated MG 94, from Maxim and Nordenfelt in London. These weapons were issued to fortress troops and mountain troops and were operational until 1944 as spare arms with the Territorial Battalion. The MG 94 was mounted at the front end and at the rear on the knees of the gunner. Two leather padded rings on the left and on the right sides of the breech of the weapon rested on the knees of the machine gunner sitting behind it and permitted sweeping fire. The machine gun MG 94 was chambered for the 7.5x53.5 mm GP 90 cartridge and was later, along other minor technical modifications, adapted for firing the more powerful 7.5x55 mm GP 11 cartridge. Six MG 94s had their water-cooling mantles drilled and cut open, making these guns air-cooled and thus water-free and lighter for use as aircraft machine guns. These six MG 94 air-cooled guns were taken out of service in 1944.

At least one MG 94 was converted to an air-cooled model for use on the Häfeli DH-1 reconnaissance aircraft.

==== 1900 (MG 00) ====
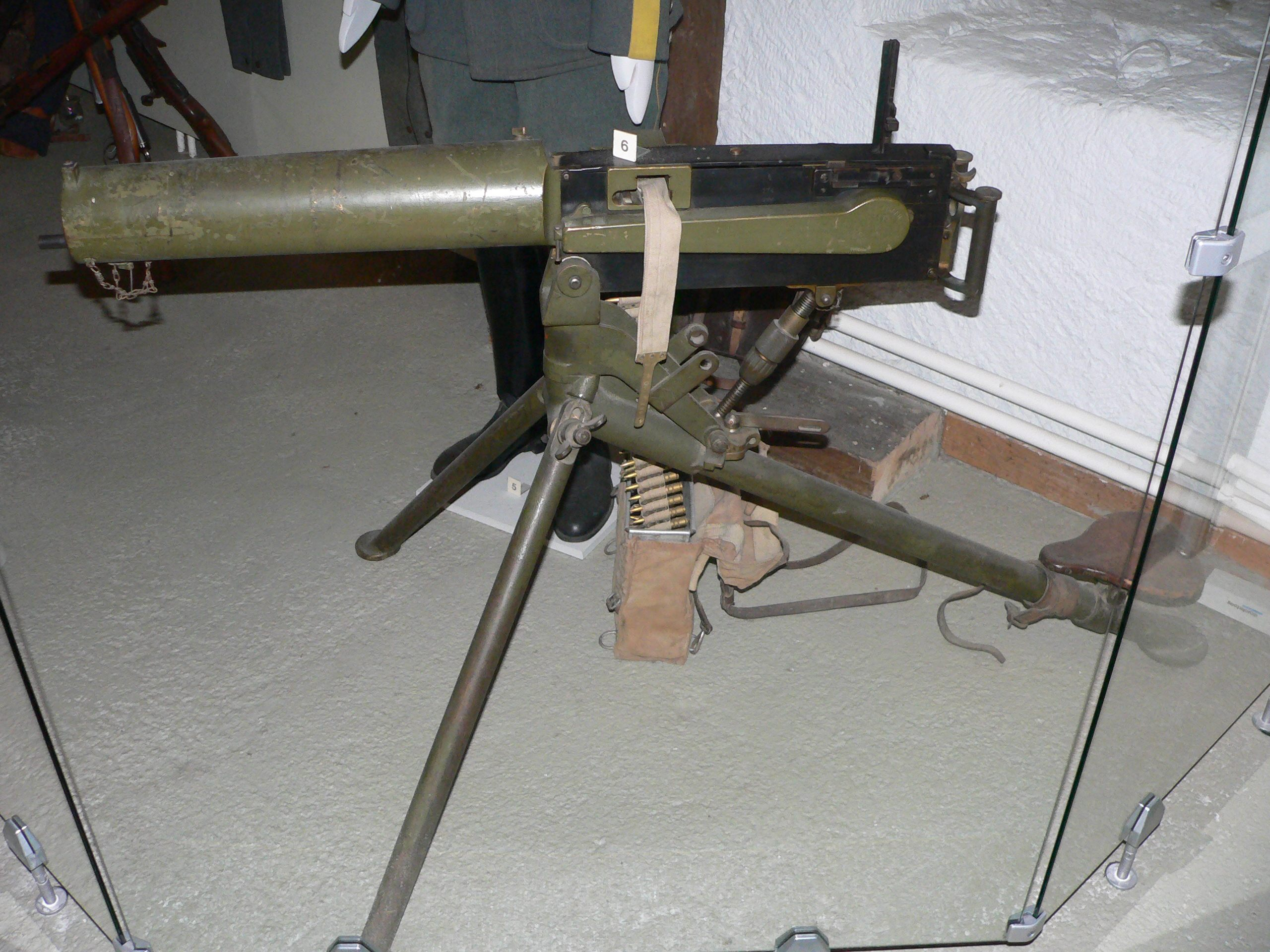
Maschinengewehr Modell 1900 on its tripod.

In 1899 Switzerland procured 69 heavy machine guns, designated MG 00, mainly from Vickers, Sons & Maxim in London, and later from Deutsche Waffen und Munitionsfabriken (DWM). These guns had tripod mounts designed for cavalry use with a gunner's seat attached to the rear support strut. The machine gun MG 00 was chambered for the 7.5x53.5 mm GP 90 cartridge and was later adapted for firing the more powerful 7.5x55 mm GP 11 cartridge.

==== 1911 (MG 11) ====
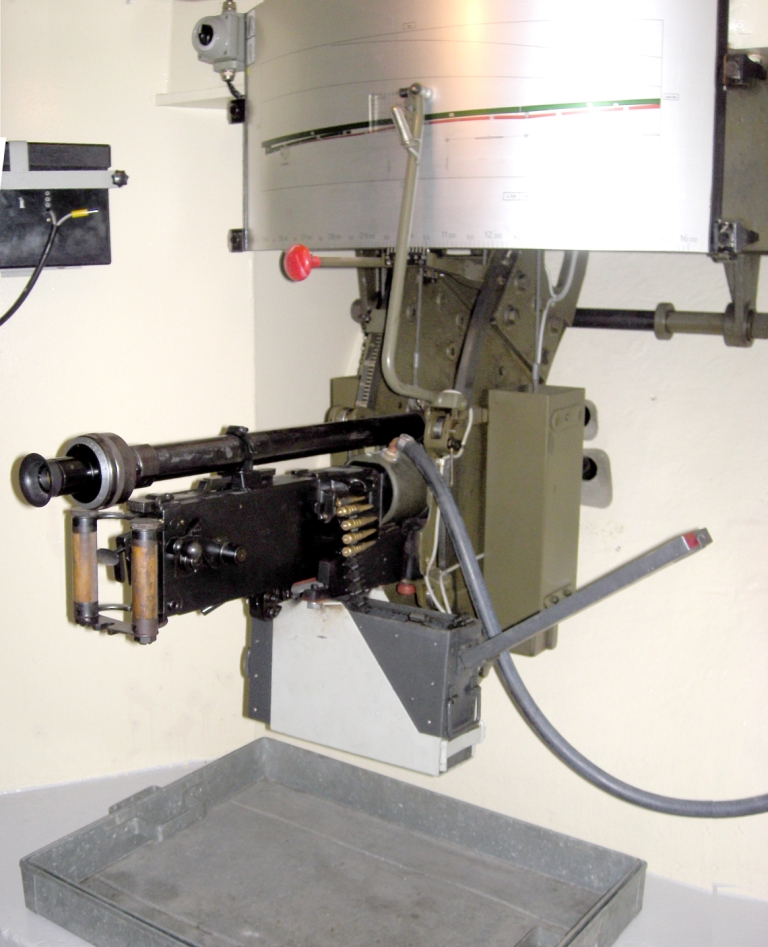
Mg 11 on fortifications mount

The MG 11 at first was originally procured from DWM Berlin (original designation by DWM is the 1909). As German deliveries ceased during World War I, the manufacturing of the MG 11 was taken up in 1915 by the Eidgenössischen Waffenfabrik W+F (confederate weapon factory W+F) Bern.

The MG 11 was a water-cooled heavy machine gun and mounted on a tripod. It was chambered for 7.5x55 mm GP 11 ammunition and came into service with the army, cavalry and was also used in fortresses, tanks and on airplanes of the Swiss Army. The gun body was the same as in German DWM 1909: a slightly modified design, which was lighter than the previous versions in Swiss service thanks to use a smaller receiver made of better steel, instead of brass and lower-quality steel. The tripod was designed from scratch as originally the naval mount for the MG 08. When applied in a fortress an optical sight and ball armoured screen was applied, the water cooling was connected to a tank and a sealing rubber was mounted behind the muzzle to prevent the penetration of flamethrower oil into the bunker.

===== 1934/1935 modernization programme =====
In 1934 and 1935 the MG 11 machine guns were adapted for using then modern metal machine gun belts that started to replace the canvas belts used by the original Maxim machine guns. A flash suppressor at the muzzle was also introduced. Further a new trigger system was fitted that allowed one handed firing, so the gunner could simultaneously operate the sweeping fire control wheel at the tripod, and additional kit for anti aircraft usage. The modernized MG 11 machine guns were marked with a white stripe running along the length of the cooling sleeve. Beginning in the early 1950s the MG 11 was gradually replaced by the air-cooled 7.5 mm Maschinengewehr Modell 1957 (MG 51) general-purpose machine gun. The replacement process was finished in the 1980s.

== Bibliography ==
- Schweizerische Armee (Hrsg.): Technisches Reglement Nr. 3, Das schwere Maschinenge-wehr (Mg. 11), provisorische Ausgabe 1939, Bern 1939
- Bericht des Chefs des Generalstabes der Armee an den Oberbefehlshaber der Armee über den Aktivdienst 1939-45
