= Eduard Rubin =

Swiss army officer and inventor (1846–1920)

Eduard Alexander Rubin
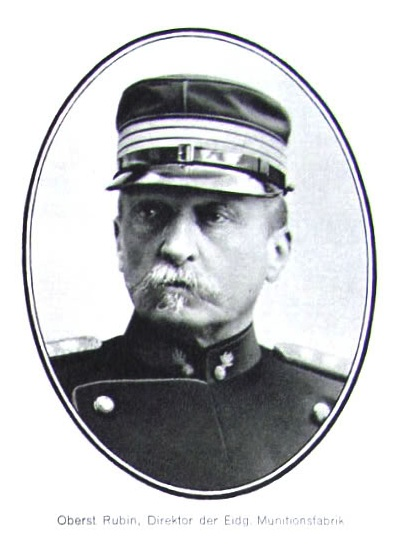
- Born: 17 July 1846; Thun, Bern, Switzerland
- Died: 6 July 1920 (aged 73); Thun, Bern, Switzerland
- Occupations: Director of the Swiss Federal Ammunition Factory and Research Center in Thun Mechanical engineer
- Notable work: 7.5×55mm Swiss

Eduard Alexander Rubin (17 July 1846 – 6 July 1920) was a Swiss mechanical engineer and artillery officer. Rubin has been credited with the development of the full metal jacket bullet in 1882. However, the earliest documented development of the design is attributed to Oberstleutnant Julius Emil Bode, who produced an unsoldered copper-jacketed bullet in 1876. Rubin developed the 7.5×55mm Swiss cartridge, the Schmidt-Rubin rifle, the Rubin-Fornerod ignition mechanism and the use of TNT and ammonium nitrate to replace gunpowder in artillery shells. Rubin's fully copper clad bullets were also the inspiration for the full metal jacket bullets introduced in 1886 for the Lebel rifle.

== Biography ==
Rubin was born in Thun on 17 July 1846, the son of Carl Rubin, a mechanic, and Maria Bader. He studied engineering at the Zurich Polytechnic from 1866 to 1868 and at the Karlsruhe Polytechnic, where he graduated in 1869. From 1871 to 1879, Rubin was an assistant, and from 1879 to 1920, the director of the Swiss Federal Ammunition Factory in Thun. He married Rosina Susanna Leuzinger, daughter of cartographer Rudolf Leuzinger, in 1876.

Rubin has been credited as the inventor of the full metal jacket bullet, with sources dating his invention to 1882. However, German Oberstleutnant Julius Emil Bode developed earlier jacketed bullet designs approximately six years earlier in 1876 and produced them in Karlsruhe. Nevertheless, the unsoldered copper-jacket bullet became known as Ruby bullets because of Rubin's experimentation with the projectile type in Switzerland.

Rubin developed the military Schmidt-Rubin rifle (together with Rudolf Schmidt), the Rubin-Fornerod ignition mechanism and the use of TNT and ammonium nitrate in artillery shells in place of gunpowder. His most famous cartridge was the 7.5×55mm Swiss, which was the standard ammunition for the Schmidt–Rubin, K31 and Stgw 57 military rifles. Rubin held the rank of colonel in the artillery of the Swiss Army, and also served as a radical member of Thun's executive council from 1883 to 1890. He died in Thun on 6 July 1920, aged 73.

== Gallery ==
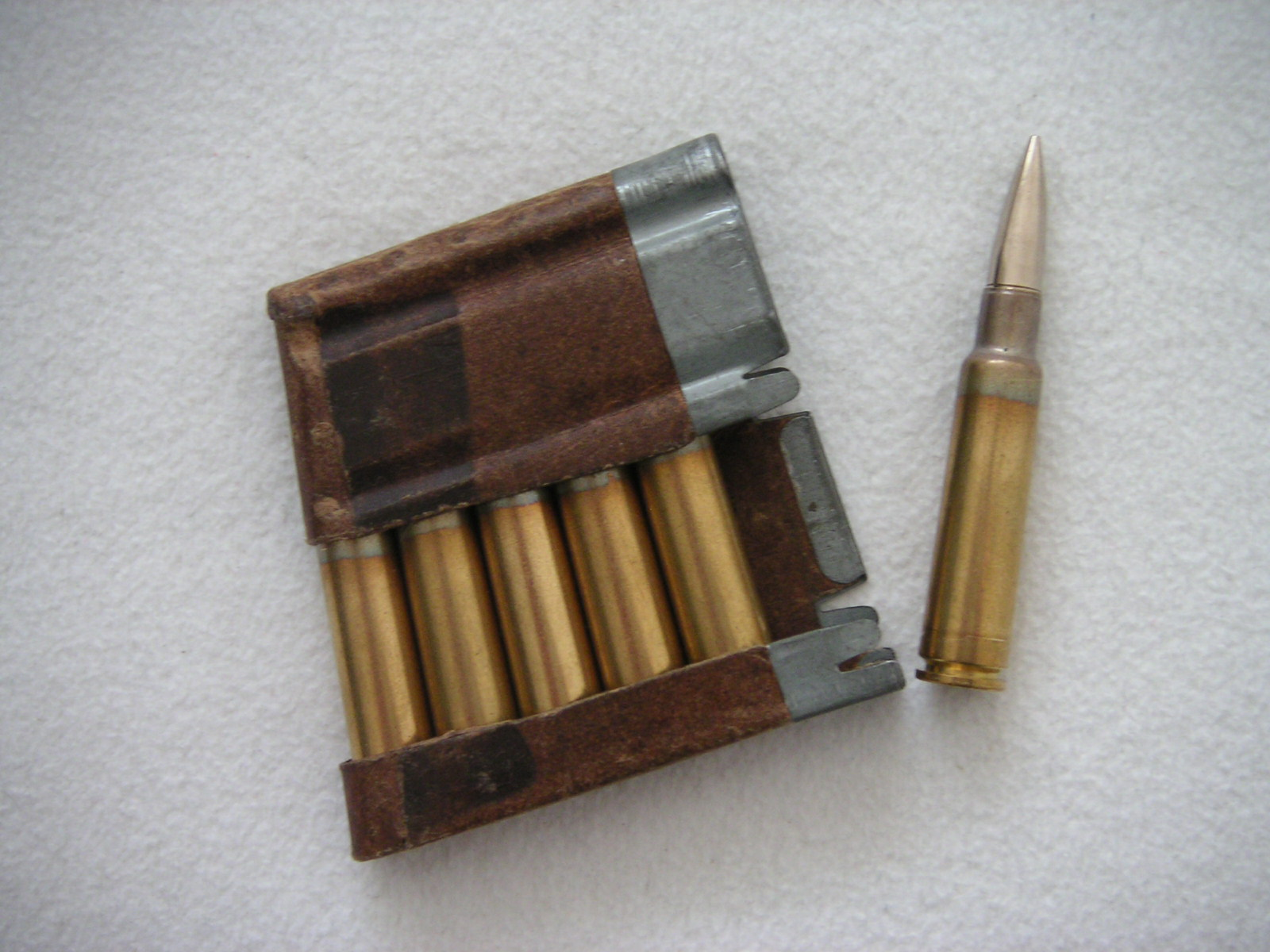
7.5×55mm Swiss

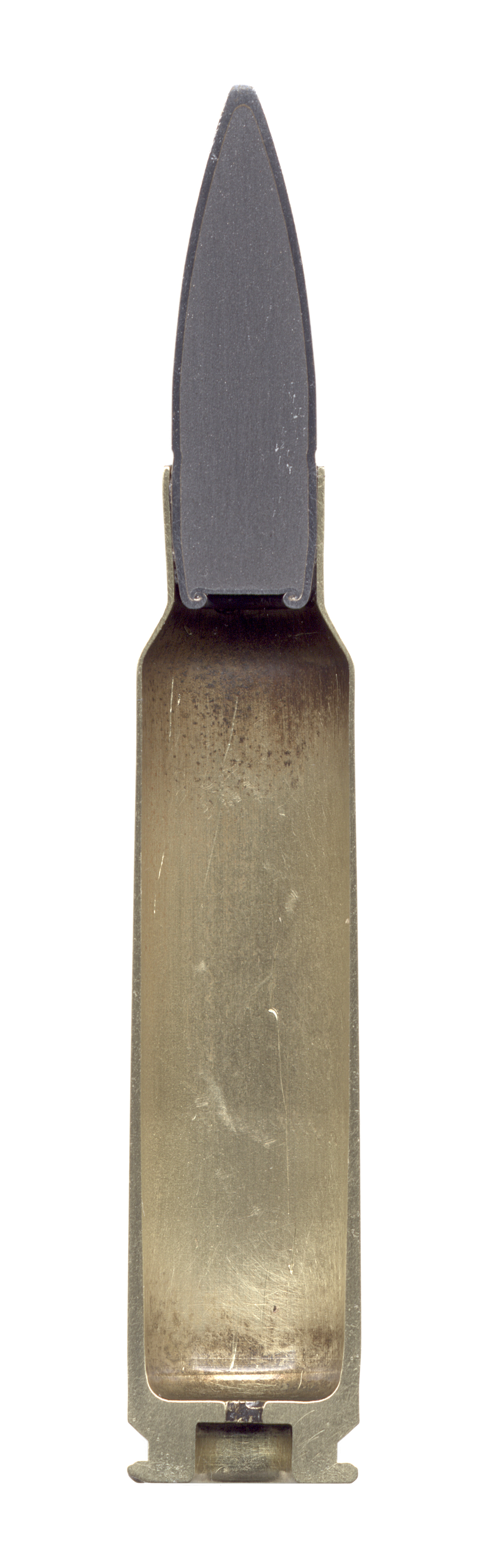
7.5x55 Cutaway cartridge

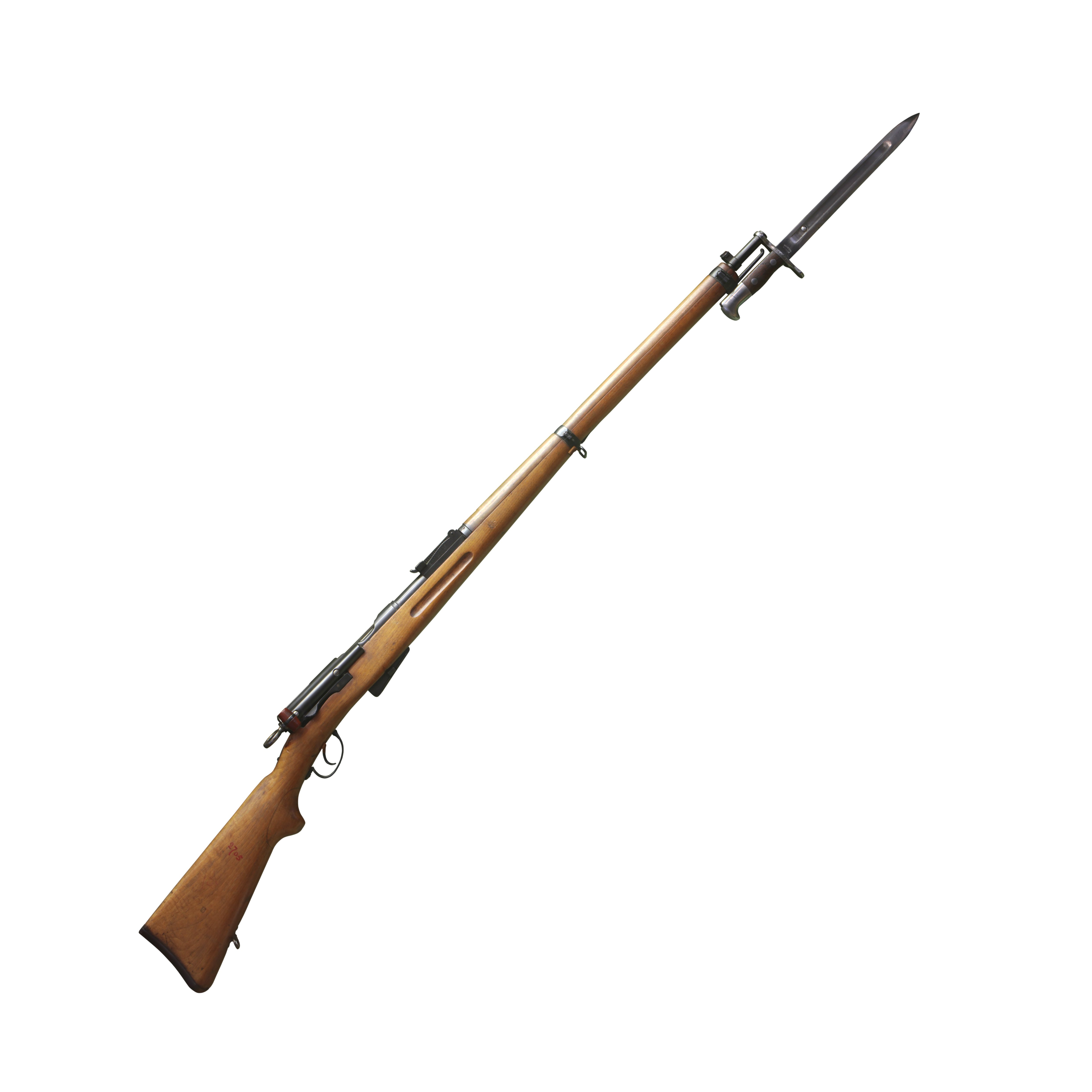
Schmidt-Rubin Model 1911

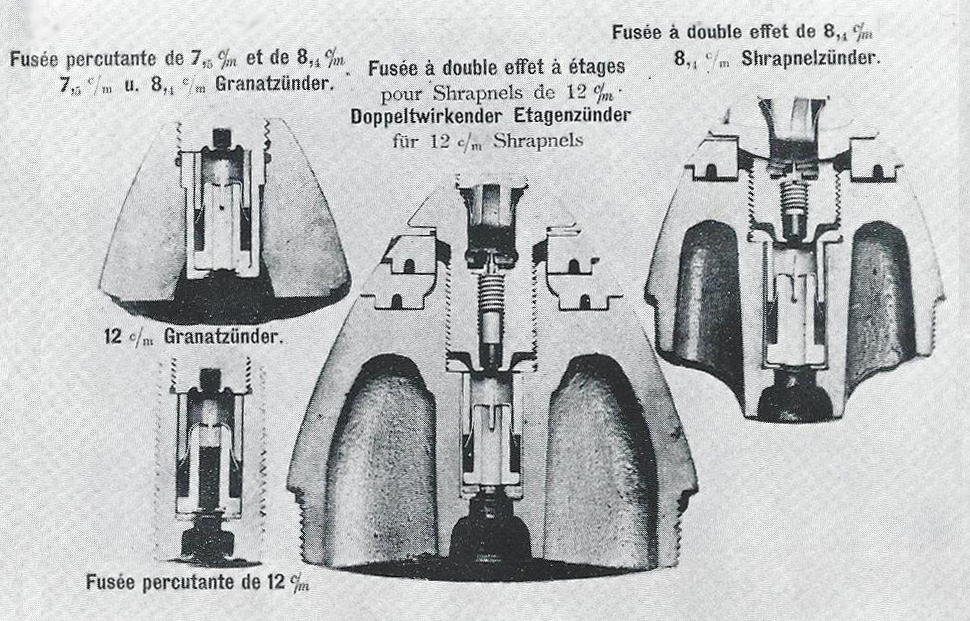
Rubin-Fornerod ignition mechanism
