= Flapper locking =

Locking mechanism used in firearms

Flapper locking is a type of locking mechanism used in firearms. It involves a pair of flappers on the sides of the bolt that each lock into an outwards recess in the receiver as the bolt is in battery. As the bolt is forced backwards after the firing of a cartridge, the flappers recede back into the bolt, therefore unlocking and sending the bolt backwards to cycle the gun. The design was patented in 1870 by Lieutenant Friberg of the Swedish Army, but the first actual example of a firearm that used this was made by another Swedish man named Kjellman in 1907. Most use of flapper locking came from the designs of the Soviet Union's Vasily Degtyaryov in the years surrounding World War II.

== Examples ==
- Gewehr 41 (Walther)
- Gewehr 43
- Degtyaryov machine gun
- RPD machine gun
- DShK
- EM-2 rifle
- T31
- AVS-36; used as secondary locking
- MG 51
- Mauser 25
- Mauser 1906/08 pistol and 1905/06 rifle
- Ulfbehrt (Alexander Arms)

== See also ==
- Roller locked (similar)
- Rotating bolt
- Bolt action
- Locked breech
- Tilting bolt
