= Schmidt–Rubin =

Schmidt–Rubin rifles
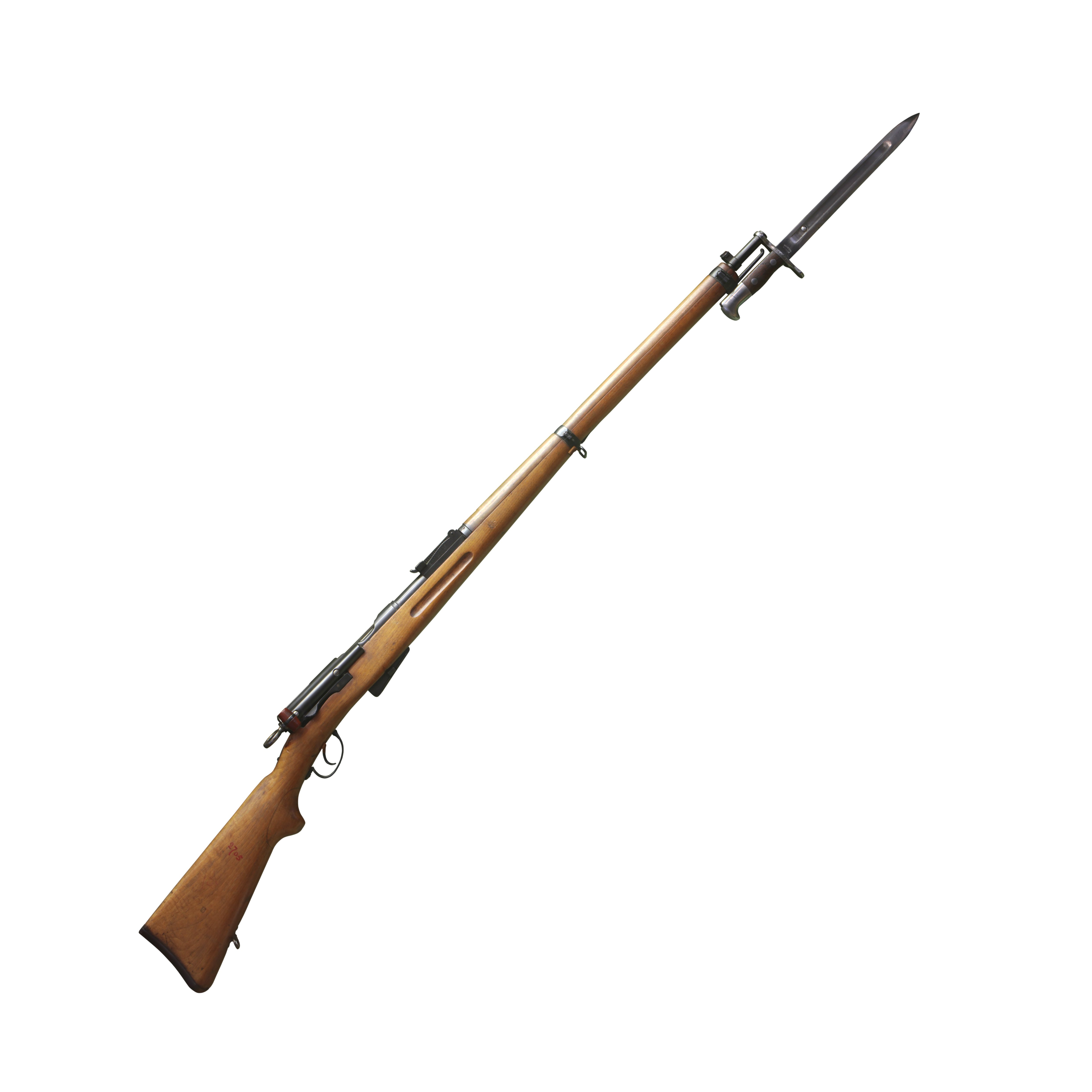
- Schmidt–Rubin Infanteriegewehr Modell 96/11 (bayonet affixed)
- Type: Bolt-action rifle
- Place of origin: Switzerland

Service history
- In service: 1889−1958
- Used by: Swiss Army
- Wars: World War I (Armed neutrality), World War II (Armed neutrality)

Production history
- Designer: Eduard Rubin and Rudolph Schmidt
- Manufacturer: W+F Bern .
- Produced: 1891–1956
- No. built: 1,366,228

Specifications
- Mass: 1889: 4.43 kg (9.8 lb); 1899/1900: 3.8 kg (8.4 lb); 1896/11: 4.5 kg (9.9 lb)
- Length: 1889: 1,302 mm (51.3 in); 1899/1900: 1,105 mm (43.5 in); 1896/11: 1,300 mm (51 in)
- Barrel length: 1889: 780 mm (31 in); 1899/1900: 592 mm (23.3 in); 1896/11: 780 mm (31 in)
- Cartridge: 7.5×53.5mm Swiss (GP90 & GP90/03); 7.5×54.5mm Swiss (GP08 experimental); 7.5×55mm Swiss (GP90/23 & GP11)
- Action: Straight-pull bolt action
- Muzzle velocity: GP90: 620 m/s (2,000 ft/s) GP11: 780 m/s (2,600 ft/s)
- Effective firing range: 550 m (601 yd)
- Maximum firing range: M1896/11, G1911:5,600 m (6,124 yd) M1889, M1889/96:.2,900 m (3,171 yd) K11:3,500 m (3,828 yd) M1899/00:2,000 m (2,187 yd)
- Feed system: 1889: 12-round detachable box magazine 1896/11: 6 round detachable

The Schmidt–Rubin rifles were a series of Swiss Army service rifles in use between 1889 and 1958. They are distinguished by the straight-pull bolt action invented by Rudolf Schmidt and use Eduard Rubin's GP90 7.5×53.5mm and 7.5×55mm rifle cartridge.

== Models ==
=== Schmidt–Rubin 1889 ===
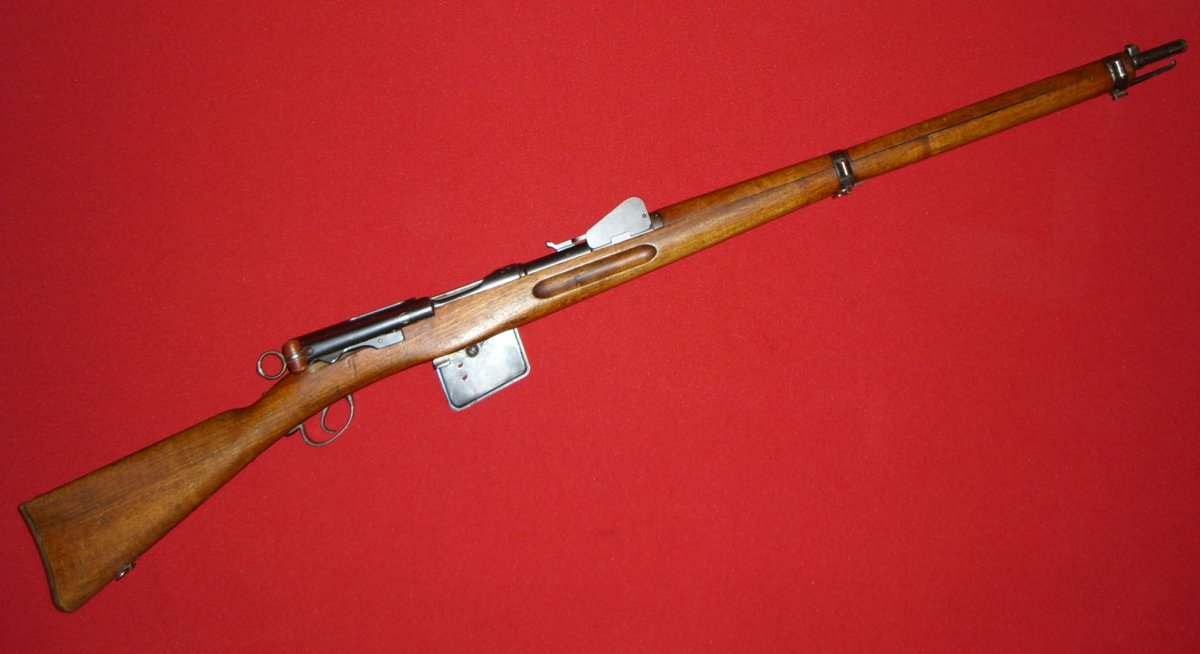
Schmidt–Rubin Model 1889 rifle chambered for the GP90 7.5×53.5mm cartridge.

The Model 1889 was the first in the series of Schmidt–Rubin rifles that served Switzerland from 1889 to 1958. The rifle takes its name from the designer of its action, Colonel Rudolf Schmidt, and the designer of its ammunition, Colonel Eduard Rubin. Production of the rifle began in 1891. The straight-pull bolt action allows the user to pull the bolt straight back to unlock the action, cock the striker, extract, and eject the spent cartridge in one motion, and then push the bolt forward to chamber a round and lock the action. This is as opposed to a traditional bolt action, which requires the user to lift the bolt handle to unlock the action before pulling the bolt back. The rifle is roughly musket length with a free-floating barrel, 12-round magazine, and wood stock that extends almost to the tip of the barrel. The Schmidt–Rubin 1889 was an advanced weapon for its time, and one of the first rifles to use copper-jacketed ammunition as its standard ammunition. Most of the bullets used in Europe at the time, except for the Mle 1886 Lebel rifle metal-jacketed 8mm bullet, were around .45 caliber, as opposed to the revolutionary .306 caliber of the GP90 7.5×53.5mm round designed by Col. Rubin in 1888. The round was "paper patched": the bullet was surrounded by a piece of paper, covering the exposed lead shank of the bullet while a steel cap covered the nose of the bullet. The paper patch helped prevent lead fouling of the bore. In 1923, long after the discontinuation of the Model 1889, the GP90/23 7.5×55mm round was produced without the paper patching instead using a full jacket around the bullet. The Model 1889 was eventually replaced by its successor models, including the Model 1896, Model 96/11, Model 1911, Model 1911 carbine.

=== Schmidt-Rubin model 1889/96 ===
The Schmidt–Rubin Model 1889/96 was the replacement for the 1889. The biggest change was moving the locking lugs from the rear to the front of the bolt sleeve, allowing the receiver to be slightly shortened. The change also allowed the bolt and receiver to handle more pressure. Colonel Schmidt was asked to do this for the model 1889, but refused, saying that it was not possible. Colonel Vogelsgang and his assistant Rebholz worked out the details, which were not complex but required time to retool. The rifle system was adopted in 1896. When the cartridge was modified in 1911 to increase the velocity of the bullet, the 1896 bolt system was used. Almost all the model 89/96 rifles were converted to 96/11; only a few remain in the original configuration, most of them private series rifles rather than military issue.

=== Schmidt-Rubin Model 1897 cadet rifle ===
The Schmidt–Rubin Model 1897 cadet rifle was intended as a replacement for the earlier Vetterli rifles. The Model 97 rifles were single-shot, using the bolt mechanism of the Schmidt–Rubin Model 89/96 rifle. It was to use a reduced-power GP90 7.5×53.5mm cartridge, for cadets. The rifles' sights were graduated both for the light and the standard loads. Approximately 7,900 cadet rifles were made.

=== Model 1899/1900 short rifle ===
The model 1899/1900 short rifle was an answer to a call for a short rifle that would replace the unpopular Model 1893 Mannlicher straight pull action carbine. The 99/00 short rifle was meant to be used by artillery and other rear-echelon troops. Design began in February 1900, and production began in 1901 and lasted for 10 years (18,750 were made). It was issued to fortress troops, artillerymen, bicycle troops, and balloon companies. The model 99/00 short rifle can be fitted with Model 1889/92 bayonet and the Model 1906 bayonet. Most of the 99/00 and later 1905 short rifles were converted to model K11 carbines when the GP11 cartridge was adopted; very few unconverted rifles remain.

=== Schmidt-Rubin 1896/11 rifle ===
The Schmidt–Rubin 1896/11 rifle, or the Model 96/11, was a Swiss upgrade to the 89/96 rifles they had, to use the more powerful cartridge adopted as the GP11. The GP11 cartridge operated at a higher chamber pressure, which the 89/96 action could easily handle. The model 89/96 rifles were modernized by changing the three-groove rifled barrel to a new 4-groove type, adding a pistol grip to the stock, changing the magazine to the 6-round type used in the 1900 short rifle, and modernizing the sights. This also streamlined the appearance of the rifles. Because more rifles were needed than were available, the model 1911 rifle, with slight changes, was put into production. Almost all of the 127,000-plus model 89/96 rifles were converted to the 96/11 specifications.

=== Model 1911 rifle ===
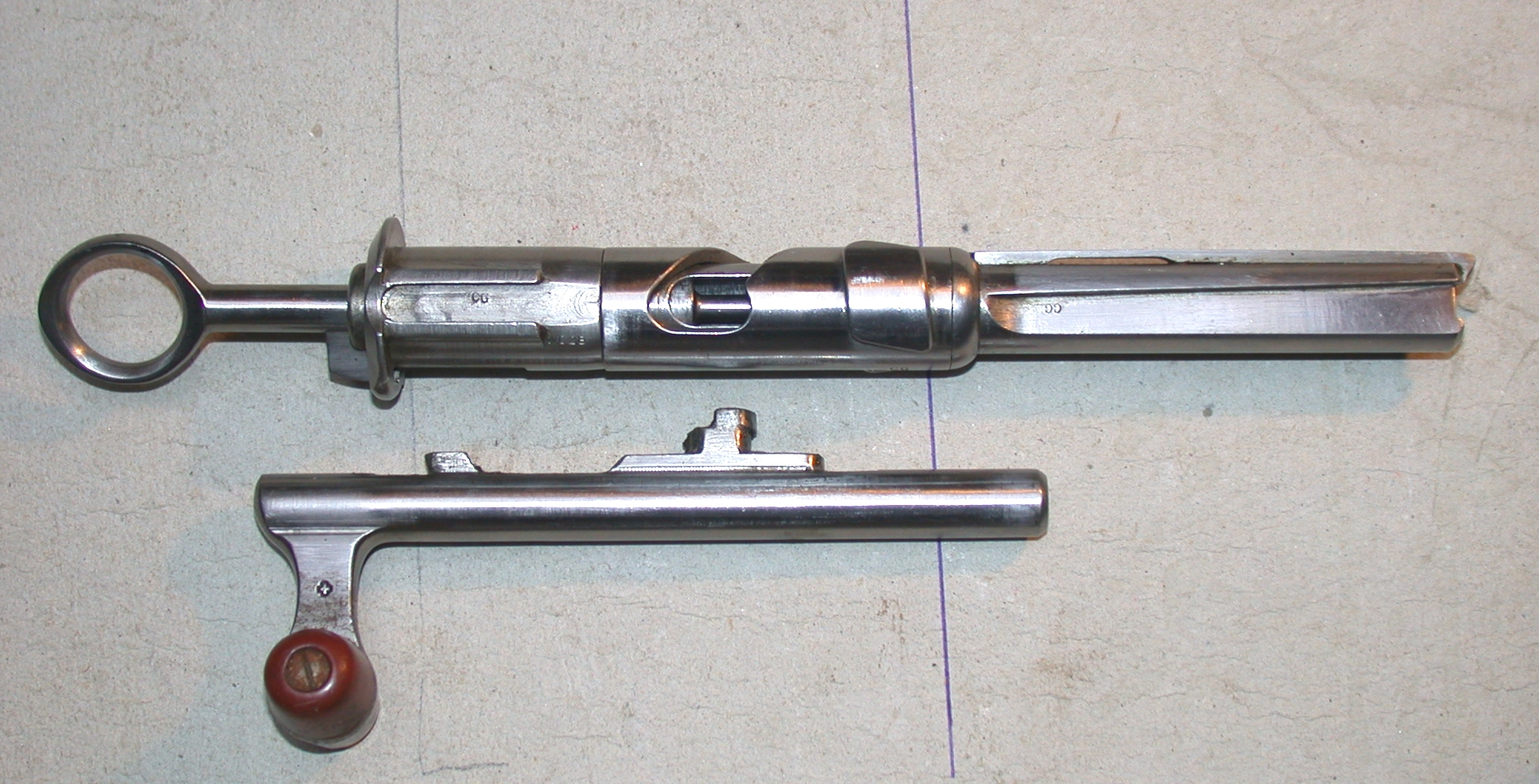
Bolt of the Model 1911 Rifle and Carbine, operating rod stripped

Schmidt–Rubin Model 1911 Rifle

An improvement over the original 1889 version of the Schmidt–Rubin rifle, the Swiss M1911 placed the locking lugs in the middle of the bolt, rather than at the rear, strengthening the action and allowing a more powerful cartridge, the Gewehrpatrone 11 or GP 11 to be used. It is distinguished from the 96/11 rifle by a curved buttplate and by a stock with an integral semi-pistol grip. It uses a graduated tangent sight which begins at 300 meters. The 1911 and 96/11 rifles were made with excellent craftsmanship, and were exceptionally accurate. As Switzerland remained neutral through both world wars, remaining rifles are typically in far better condition than other European rifles of the time.

=== Model 1911 carbine ("K11") ===
Support troops, cavalry, and certain other units required a shorter rifle, so the Swiss designed the Model 1911 carbine, smaller and lighter than the rifle, and still very accurate. It became a favorite of the Swiss Army, and its popularity contributed to the design of its successor the K31. Production of the K11 carbine included conversion of the model 1900 and 1905 short rifles to the newer specifications; the earlier short rifles are rarely found in their original state. The K11 rifle and carbine were the last of the Vogelsgang/Rebholz weapons produced.

=== Other models ===
Other models include:

- K31 carbine, a significant later development which was still a straight pull action but much different and improved over the older Schmidt design. Adolf Furrer designed the K31 action.
- Model 1905 carbine
- ZfK31/42 and /43
- Z fK55 sniper rifle
