= MG 51 =

Maschinengewehr 51
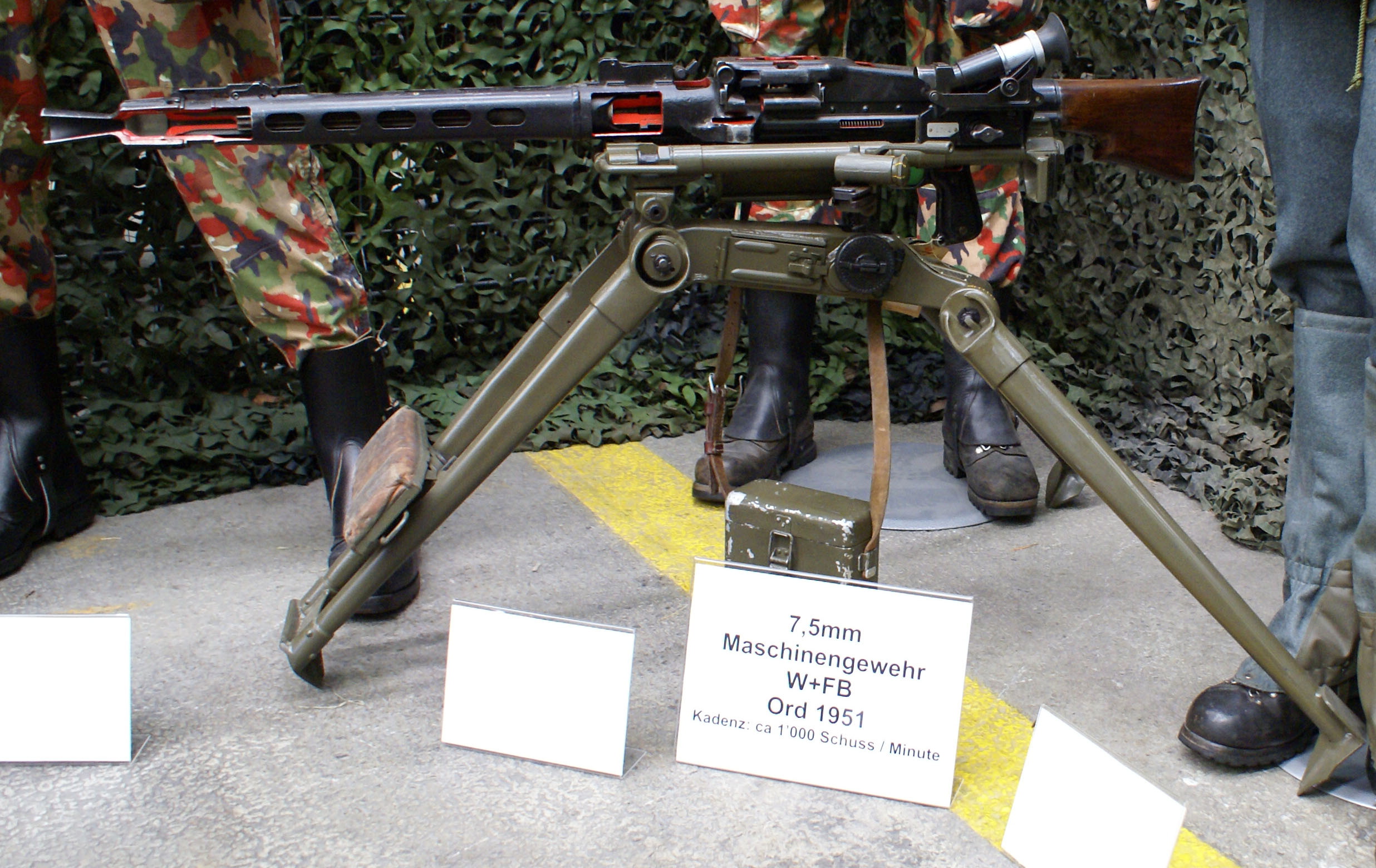
- Swiss presentation of the MG51
- Type: General-purpose machine gun
- Place of origin: Switzerland

Service history
- In service: 1951–present
- Used by: Swiss Army

Production history
- Designed: 1942–1950
- Manufacturer: Waffenfabrik Bern
- Produced: 1951–present

Specifications
- Mass: 16 kg (35.27 lb) (with bipod); 26 kg (57.32 lb) (with tripod)
- Length: 1,270 mm (50.0 in)
- Barrel length: 563 mm (22.2 in)
- Cartridge: 7.5×55mm Swiss
- Caliber: 7.5 mm
- Action: Short–recoil, flapper-locked
- Rate of fire: 1,000 rounds per minute, 570 and 1,000 rounds per minute (Pz Mg 87)
- Muzzle velocity: 750 m/s (2,460 ft/s)
- Effective firing range: 100 – 2,000 m sight adjustments
- Feed system: 50-round magazine belt
- Sights: Iron sights 2.3x optical sight

The 7.5 mm Maschinengewehr 1951 or Mg 51 is a general-purpose machine gun manufactured by W+F of Switzerland. The weapon was introduced into Swiss service when the Swiss Army initiated a competition for a new service machine gun to replace the MG 11 heavy machine gun and the Furrer M25 light machine gun adopted in 1911 and 1925 respectively.

== History ==
Around 1942 the Swiss army initiated a competition for a new service machine gun to replace both the “heavy” MG 11 and the “light” Lmg25, adopted in 1911 and 1925 respectively. According to the specifications of the Kriegstechnische Abteilung (KTA) (War Technology Department), the maximum cyclic rate of fire of 1,000 rounds per minute should not be exceeded. Three participants joined the competition–government-owned Waffenfabrik Bern, and privately owned factories SIG and Hispano-Suiza. Waffenfabrik Bern based its development on the hugely successful World War II German MG 42 and its accessories.

The first prototypes emerged in around 1944, and looked much like MG 42, although the shape of receiver and butt was somewhat different. With all these prototypes, short shots were detected, which could not be tolerated, as the Swiss overshoot their own troops during live fire exercises.

The final design, which appeared in 1950, was in most respects still similar to the MG 42, although many components were produced by machining instead of stamping, which increased the weight, the stability and the production costs of the machine gun. To prevent locking timing induced short shots problems, Waffenfabrik Bern changed the locking system from roller locking to flapper locking. These locking methods are similar in concept. The resulting weapon was in the light machine gun role 4.4 kg (9.70 lb) heavier than the German MG 42, and much more finely made and finished.

The MG 51 served as a primary infantry and vehicle machine gun for Swiss army. The Mg 51 was usually fired in the medium machine gun role from its universal tripod at operating ranges of 600 to 1,500 m (656 to 1,640 yd). When deployed in the light machine gun role at close range up to 600 m (656 yd), short bursts of 6 shots could be fired from its bipod and in mobile assaults it was also possible to shoot from a standing position from the hip. Since 2005 the MG 51 was gradually replaced in service with lighter and less expensive, but also less powerful 5.56mm FN Minimi machine gun of Belgian origin and manufacture.

== Design details ==
The MG 51 is a short-recoil-operated, locked breech, air-cooled and automatic only, belt-fed weapon. It uses a locking system with a two-piece bolt and dual locking flaps located in the front part of the bolt. These flaps engage the cuts made in the short barrel extension to provide rigid locking. Upon recoil, the flaps are retracted toward the center of the bolt, to unlock it. An additional lever-type bolt accelerator is provided; it is located in receiver, next to the barrel breech and below the bolt. The gun housing also somewhat resembles the German MG 42, although it is made from two separate parts – the barrel jacket (made from stamped steel) and receiver (a solid machined body). The barrel jacket is permanently welded to the front of the receiver.

The barrel can be changed rapidly if required; the barrel change procedure is similar to that of the MG 42, with the locking latch located at the right side of the jacket, which is opened to provide a barrel replacement window.

The belt feed system is also similar to the MG 42, with single-stage cartridge feed that uses open-pocket steel belts (push-through type) and a two-stage belt pull (on both the opening and closing movement of the bolt). Feed is from the left side. Ammunition boxes could hold up to 200 belted rounds. For the mobile role, 50-round belts can be loaded into drum-type containers, which are clipped to the side of the gun

The standard open-type iron sighting line is graduated from 100 to 2,000 meters (109 to 2,187 yd) in 100 meters (109 yd) increments and the front sight element is mounted on a folding post. Alternatively a 2.3× optical sight is available that can also be used up to 2,000 meters (2,187 yd).

For the light machine gun role a folding bipod is fitted to the barrel jacket. For the medium machine gun role (sustained or long range fire missions) a universal heavy tripod was developed.

With the Flab (Flugabwehr) mount, the MG 51 was also used for frontal combat against aircraft up to a distance of around 800 m (875 yd).

Early production guns had wooden pistol grips and buttstocks; more modern guns have polymer furniture.

== Variants ==
- Mg 51: Standard version
- Mg 51/71: Version for vehicles like the Mowag Eagle or Pz 68
- Mg 51/80: Version for fortifications
- Pz Mg 87: Coaxial version for the Pz 87 with electromagnetic trigger

The Pz Mg 51/71 is a vehicle-mounted variant for armoured vehicles like the MOWAG Eagle scout car. The Pz 55 and 57 (Centurion Mk 5/2 and Centurion Mk 7/2), Panzer 68 battle tanks and the Entp Pz 65 recovery tank all featured various Mg 51-based Pz Mg variants to fit as coaxial or pintle-mounted (anti-aircraft) machine guns.

The more modern Pz Mg 87 variant is used on the Pz 87 "Leopard 2" tank, with the only difference being an electromagnetic trigger, along with a switch allowing a 50% reduced fire rate, and a mount to fit inside the armour instead of the forward frame.

== Users ==
- Denmark chambered for .30-06 Springfield
- Switzerland

== Gallery ==
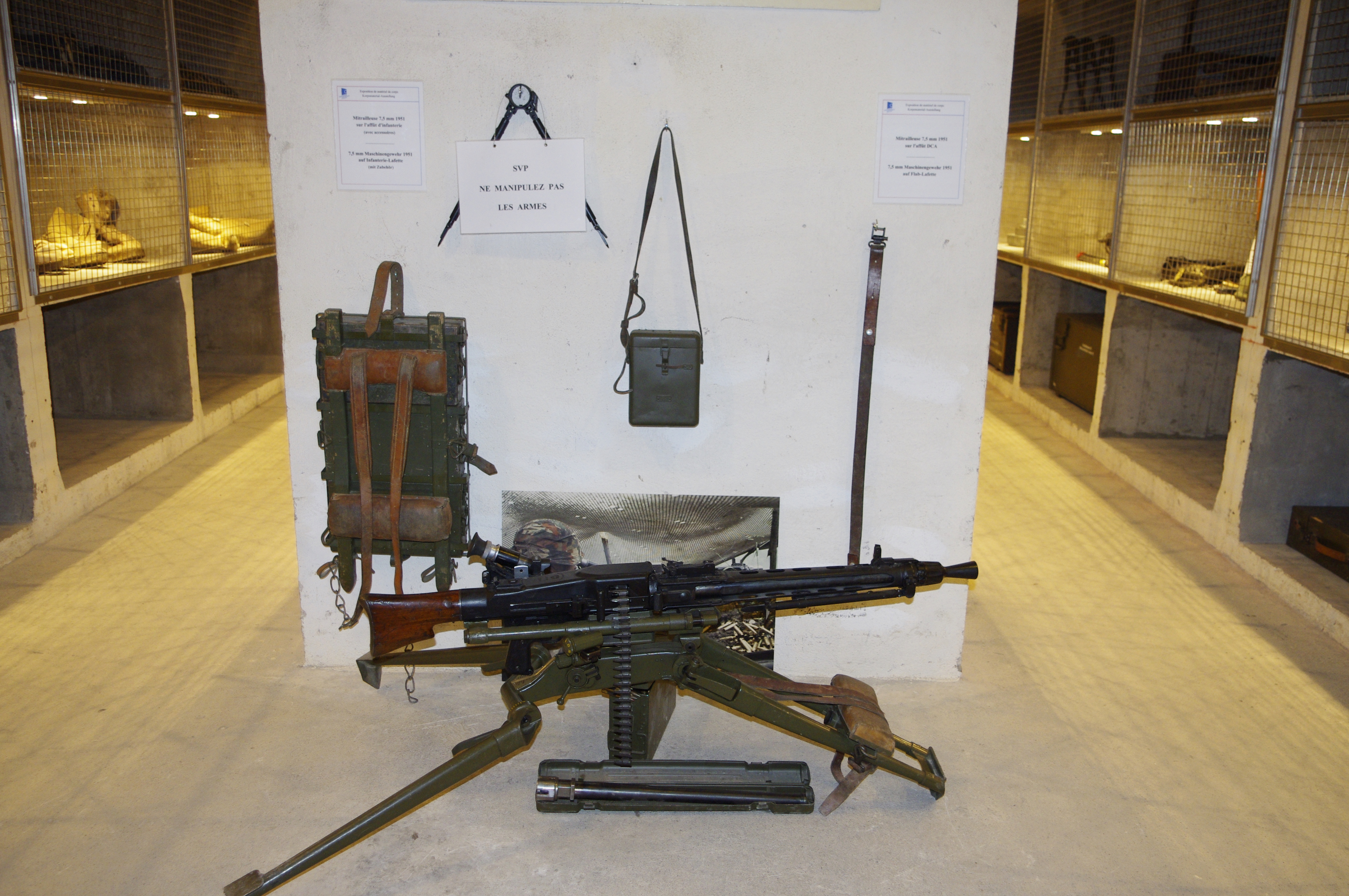
Mg 51 on a tripod with accessories. Notice the tubular (spare) barrel protector used as a field accessory.

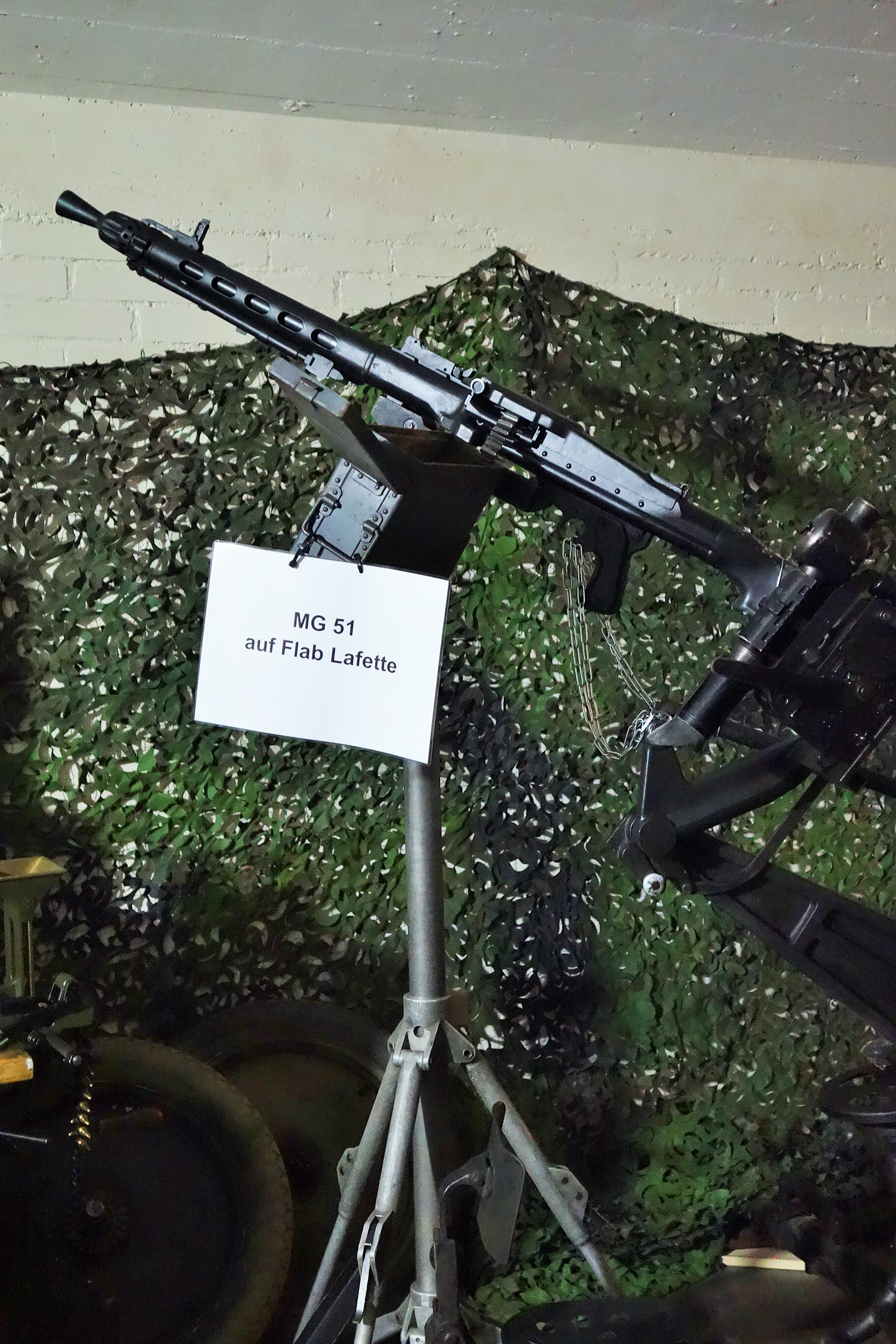
Mg 51 on a Flab anti-aircraft mount

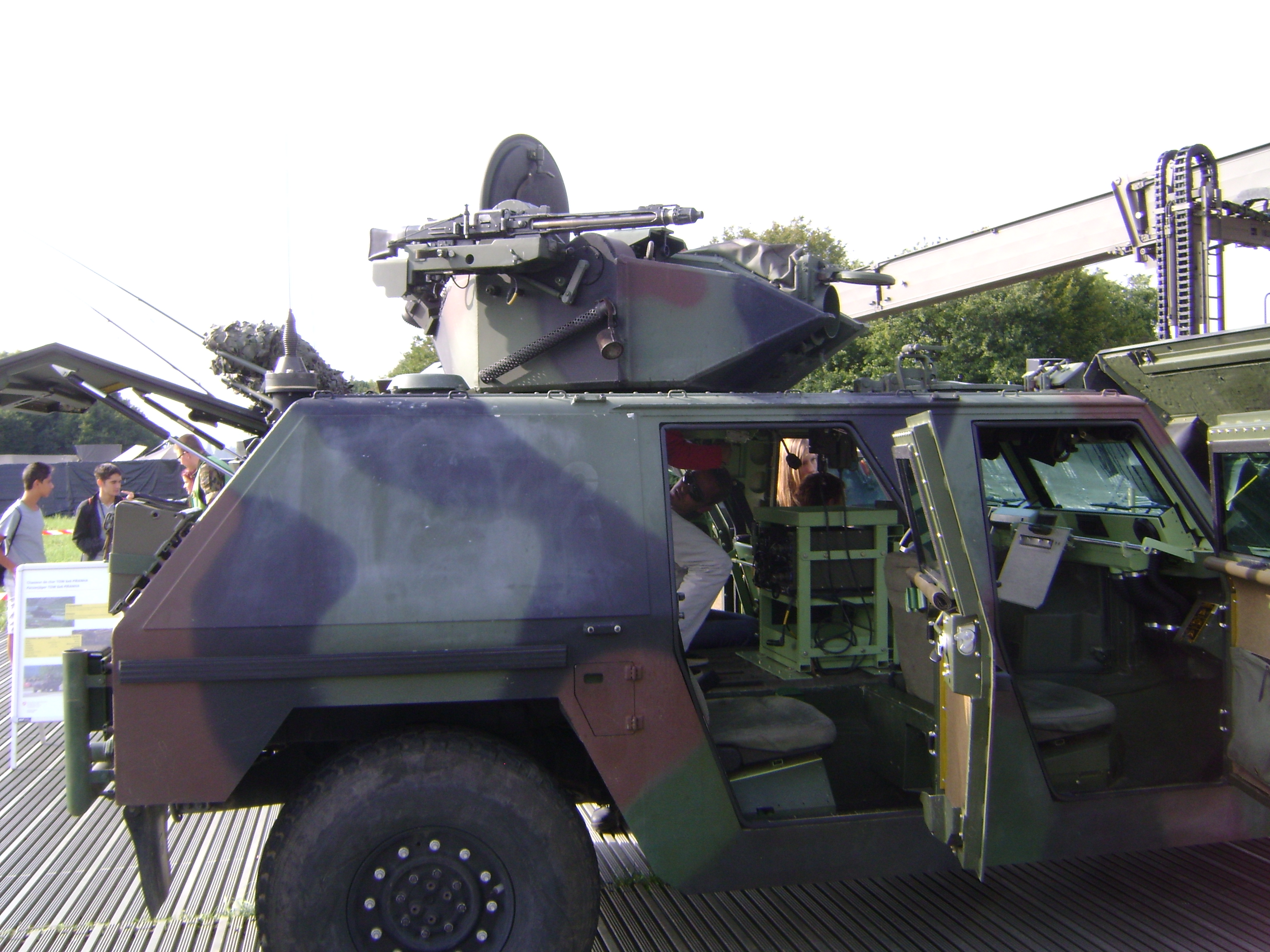
MOWAG Eagle II armed with a weapon station mounted Pz Mg 51/71

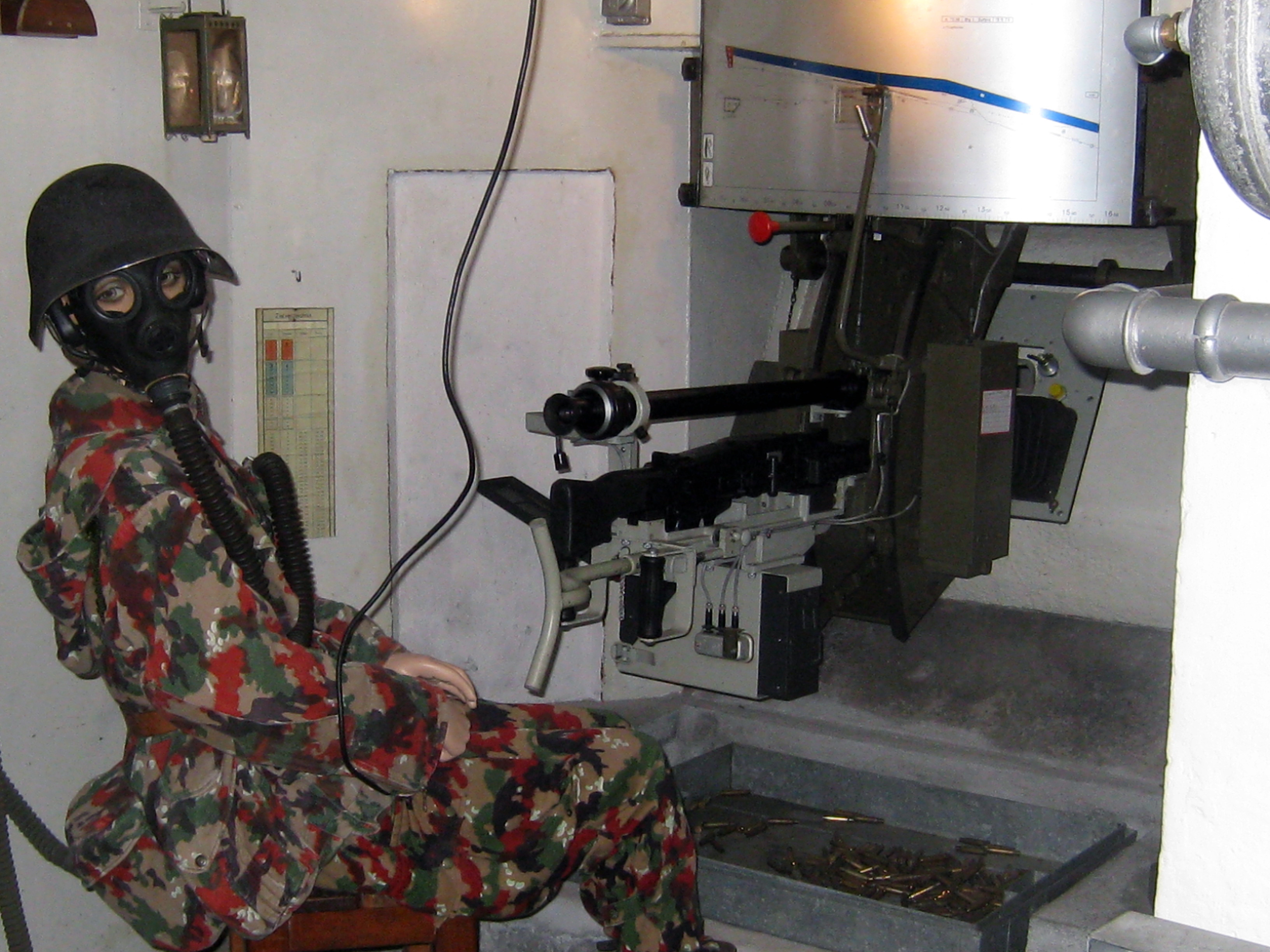
Mg 51/80 in a fortification

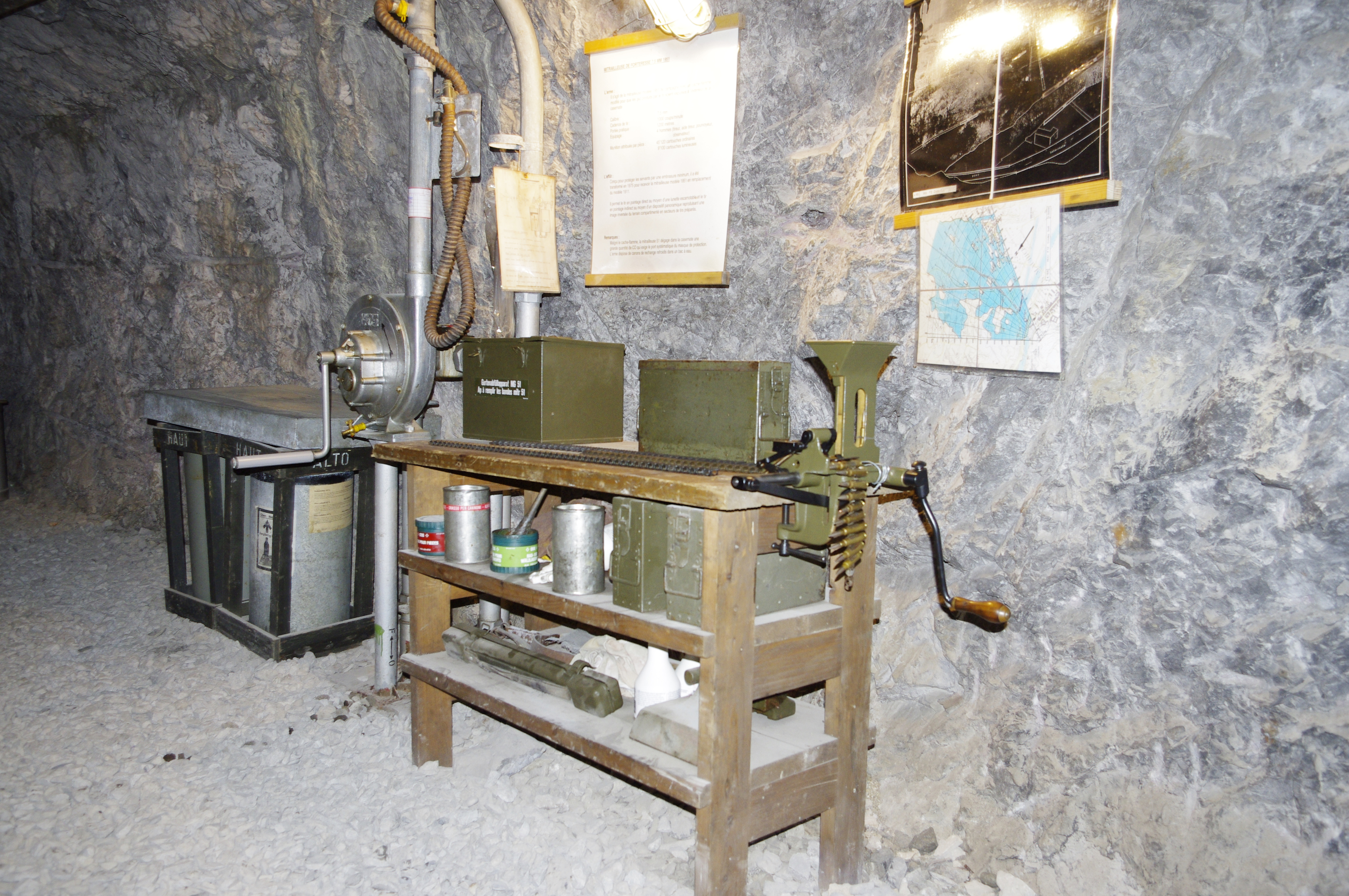
Belt filling machine in a fortification

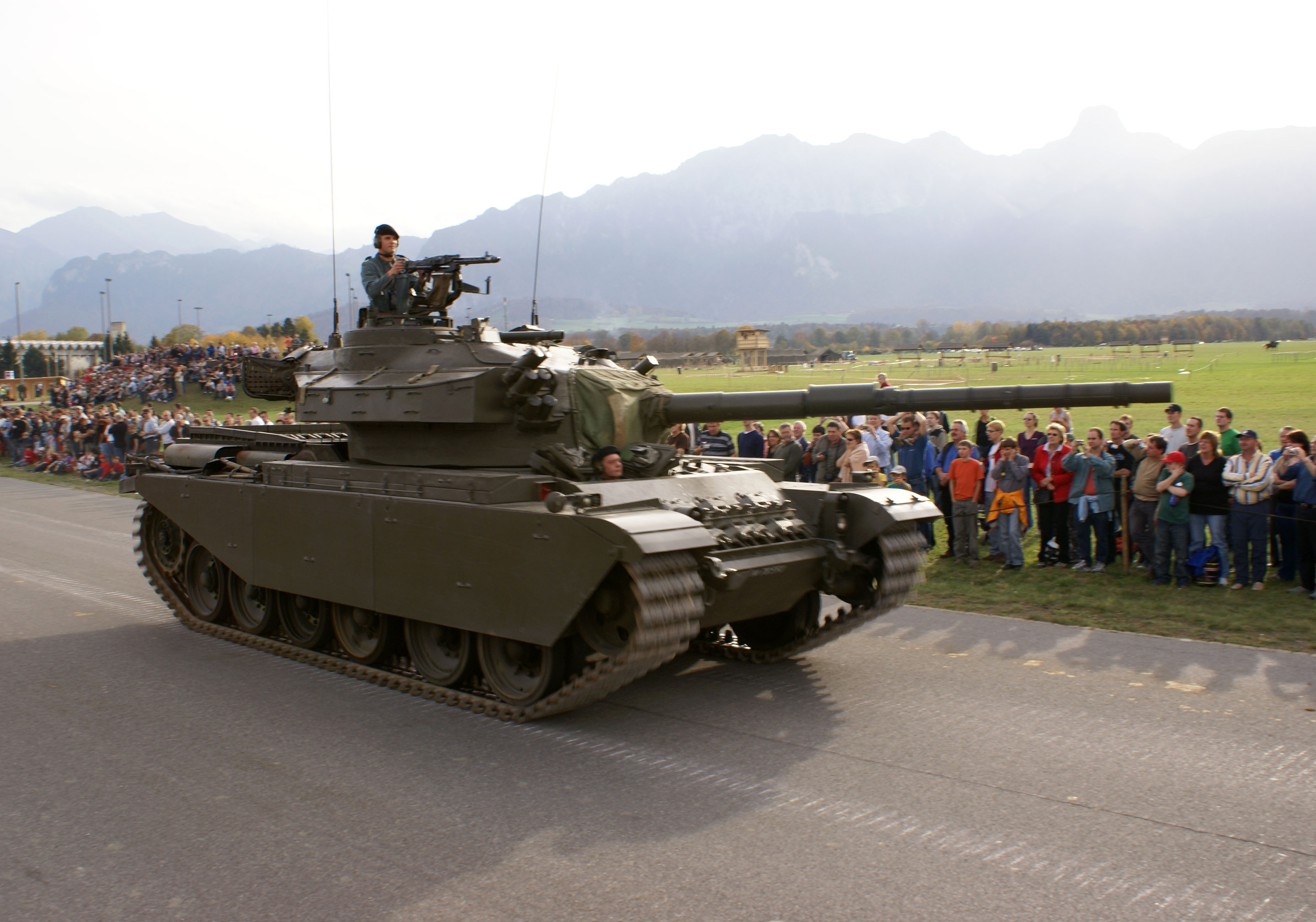
Pz 55 armed with a coaxial and pintle-mounted Mg 51

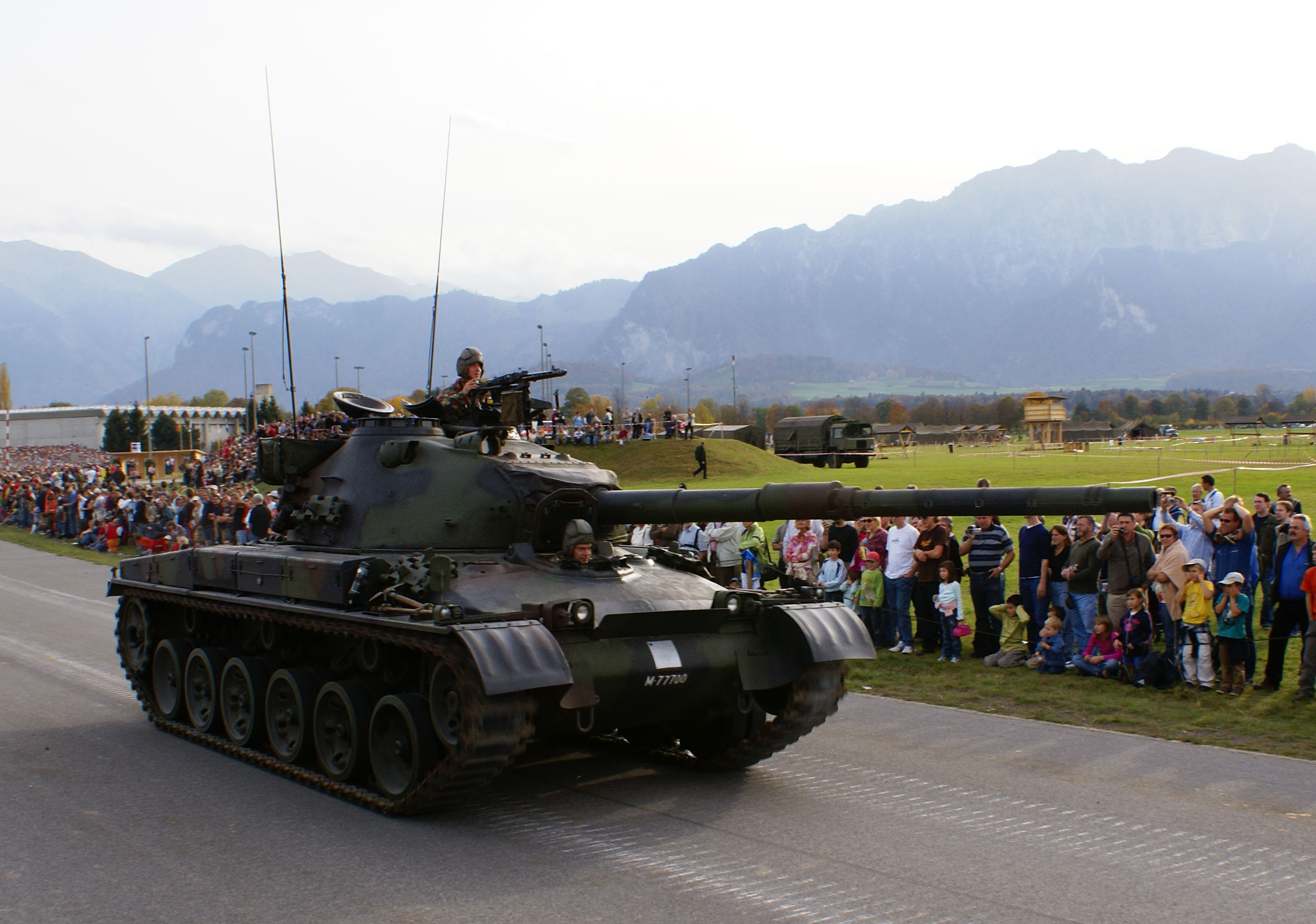
Pz 68 armed with a coaxial and pintle-mounted Mg 51

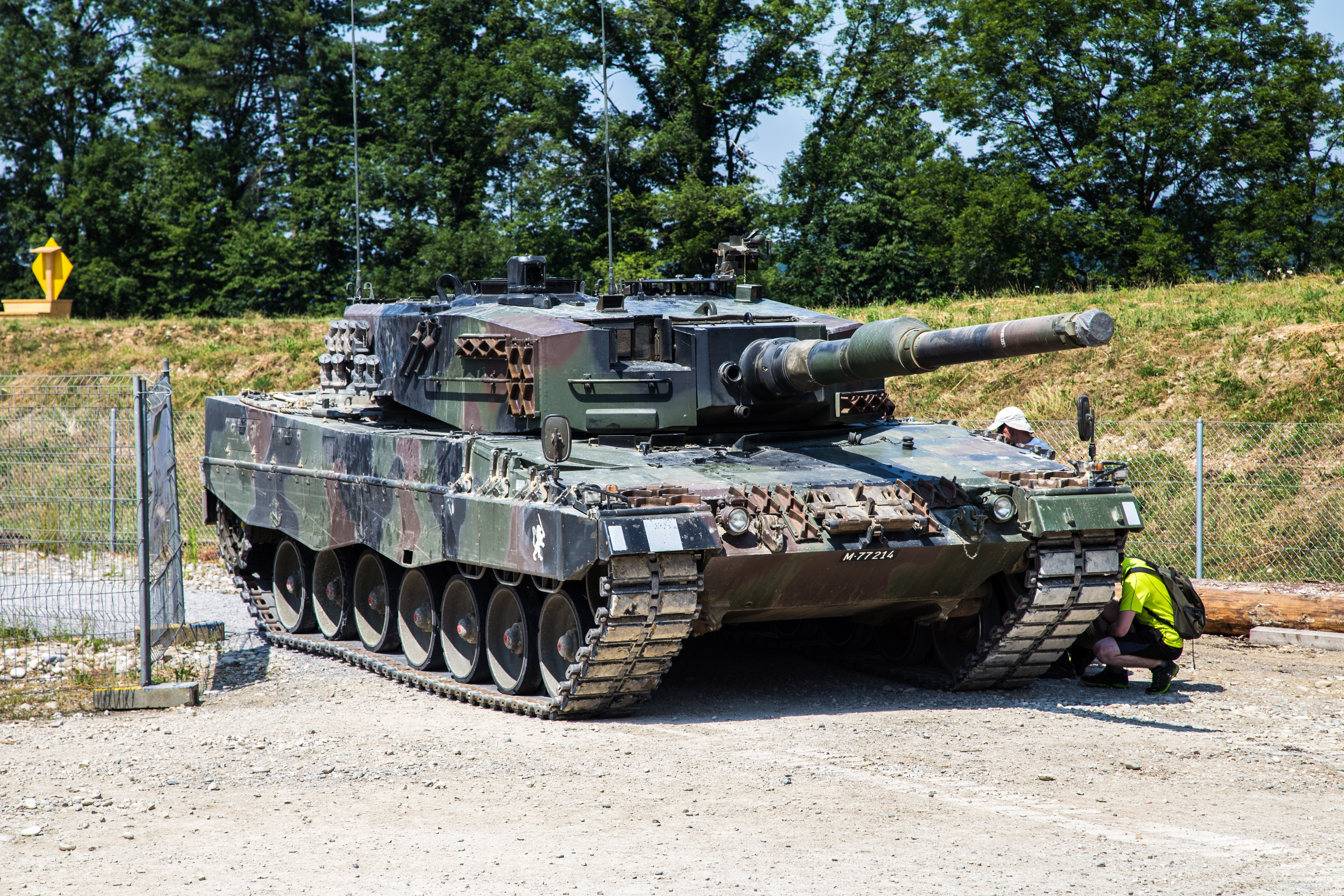
Pz 87 armed with a coaxial Pz Mg 87

Notice the tubular barrel protectors used as a field accessory.

== See also ==
- MG 42
