= 12 cm Lang brons =

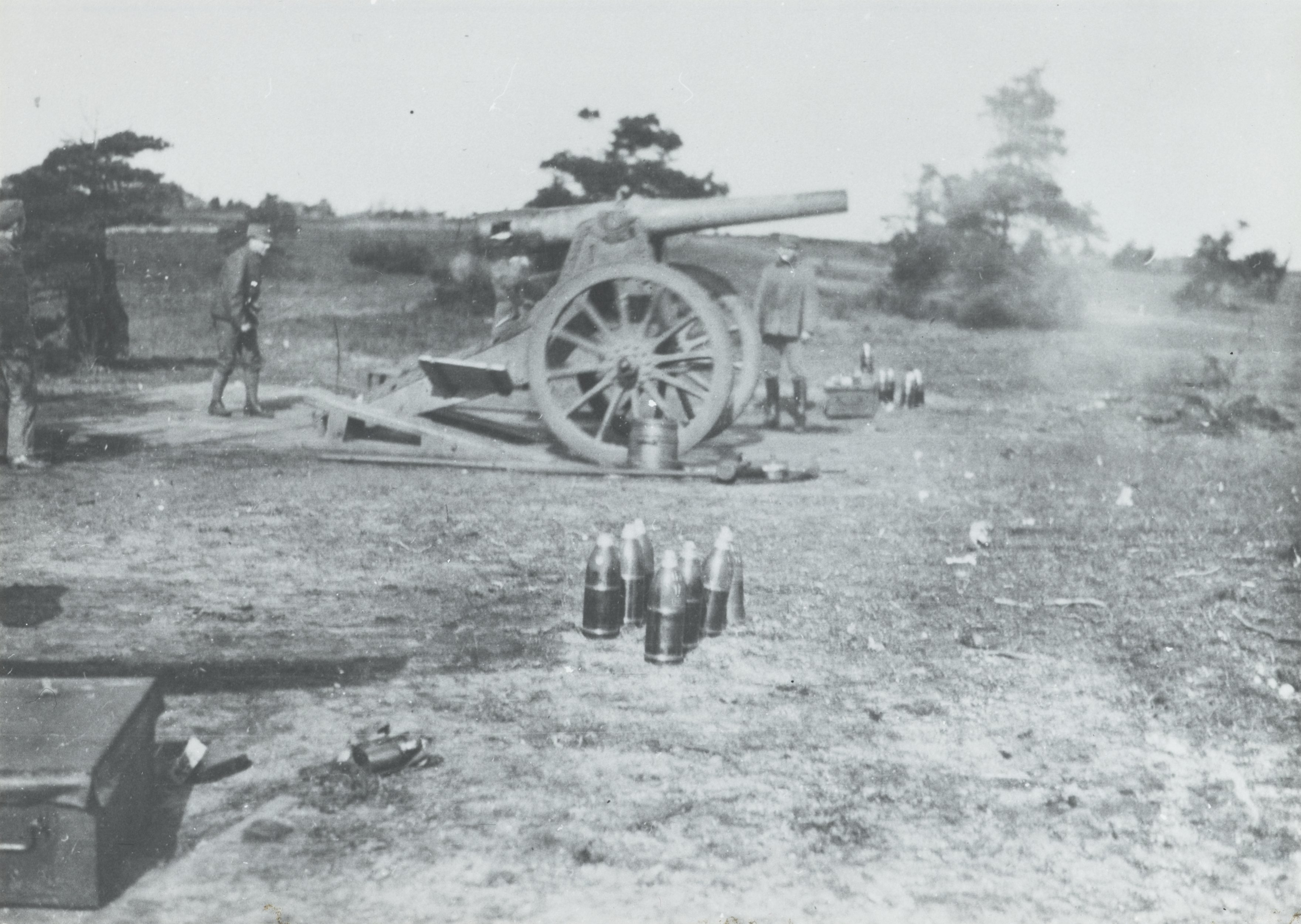
- A 12 cm Lang brons is fired c. 1925
- Type: siege artillery
- Place of origin: Germany, Netherlands

Service history
- Used by: Royal Netherlands Army

Production history
- Manufacturer: Rijks Geschutgieterij

Specifications
- Mass: 1,500 kg
- Length: 2,925 mm
- Caliber: 120 mm
- Effective firing range: 6,500 m

The 12 cm Lang brons was a 19th-century Dutch siege gun. It was a locally produced steel bronze version of the 12 cm Lang staal.

== Context ==
=== The Dutch army adopts breechloading ===
After the Franco-Prussian War (1870–1871) the Netherlands started to modernize its army. The most urgent measures were the procurement of heavy coastal artillery, a process which had already started after the 1862 Battle of Hampton Roads. Next came the procurement of breechloading rifles for the infantry, and the modernization of the siege artillery and the field artillery. This led to the procurement of the breechloading bronze 12 cm K.A. and 8 cm A. brons. These guns were produced domestically, starting in 1874.

Meanwhile, it had become clear that steel rifled breechloaders were superior to bronze rifled breechloaders. In 1876 20 15 cm zwaar staal guns and 60 12 cm Lang staal guns were therefore bought at Krupp. The 12 cm Lang staal gun would cost 7,980 mark or 13,200 guilders a piece, including the carriage and everything else. 833 guns of 12 cm Lang were thought to be needed. On 1 January 1880 there were 126 12 cm Lang staal available in the Netherlands. 32 still had to be delivered.

=== Steel bronze ===
In the mid-1870s Franz von Uchatius copied an autofrettage (avant la lettre) process from a 1869 American patent without a license and marketed it as steel bronze (staalhard brons). The process used a bronze alloy that contained only 8% tin instead of the usual for the Netherlands 11.5%. A steel bronze gun was cast using a technique called gravity die casting, using a metal form. This increased the density of especially the outer layers of the metal when cast, because these cooled off rapidly. The most important part of the technology was increasing the density of the inner layers even further. This was done by repeatedly driving objects of slightly increasing diameter through the tube. Produced in this way, a steel bronze gun could withstand the effects of the increased explosive force of the latest artillery almost as well as cast steel did, although it was clear already then that the latter are superior.

For many countries the invention of steel bronze was important, because they were not able to produce cast steel guns. In the Netherlands, the Rijks Geschutgieterij (national gun foundry) could be adapted to cast steel bronze guns. Casting steel guns was not feasible for the Dutch at the time. The first Dutch attempt at a steel bronze gun centered on producing a steel bronze field gun to replace the 8.4 cm Feldgeschütz Ord 1871. Three steel bronze 8.5 cm guns were constructed in the second half of 1879. The trial of these guns was positive with regard to using steel bronze, but nevertheless showed some problems. It all led the Ministry of Defense to buy the 8 cm staal at Krupp in Germany.

== History ==
=== Available capacity at Rijks Geschutgieterij ===
The decision to buy the new 8.4 cm field gun in Germany, instead of producing a local steel bronze version, freed up production capacity at the Rijks Geschutgieterij. It meant that the Ministry of War could order a steel bronze version of the 12 cm Lang at Rijks Geschutgieterij, instead of ordering more of these expensive guns in Germany. In this respect the decision to buy the new 8,4 cm field gun in Germany actually saved expenses!

The cost difference between the steel and steel bronze versions of the 12 cm Lang was 3,200 guilders per gun. At the time 193 12 cm Lang were still thought to be required immediately. The switch to producing the 12 cm Lang brons implied that the minister put an end to the procurement of more 12 cm Lang staal from Krupp. This is indeed what happened.

=== Production of the 12 cm Lang brons ===
60 12 cm Lang brons were planned to be cast by the Rijks Geschutgieterij (national gun foundry) in the Hague in 1880. On 1 January 1883 the total number of available both steel and steel bronze 12 cm Lang guns was 248. Implying that 90 had already been made. 12 more 12 cm Lang brons would still be delivered on 1 January 1883. At least 105 more 12 cm Lang were still thought to be required.

=== Replacement ===
Both the 12 cm Lang brons and the steel version quickly became obsolete after 1897. In that year the Canon de 75 modèle 1897, the first gun with a recoil mechanism was introduced. In 1927 the Dutch reassigned the 15 cm zwaar staal and the 12 cm staal to the field artillery, where they would serve in World War II. What happened to the 12 cm Lang brons is not that clear.

== Characteristics ==
=== The barrel ===
The characteristics of the 12 cm Lang brons were the same as those of the 12 cm Lang staal. The barrel was exactly the same on the inside, which allowed the guns to be used in the same way. Of course the metal of the barrel differed, and therefore its weight differed. The bronze version weighed 1,500 kg as opposed to the 1,420 kg of the steel version. While the steel version had a round breech, the bronze version had a flat breech platte wig. There was a small difference in the allowed maximum explosive pressure inside the barrel. For the steel version, this was 2,000 atm. For the 12 cm Lang brons it was 1,800 atm. Therefore the maximum range for the steel gun was 7,100 m, while for the steel bronze guns this was 6,500 m.

The exterior form of the bronze barrel was also different, which was a consequence of the bronze version being cast, while the steel version was built up. On the outside the 12 cm Lang brons gun barrel can be distinguished from the 12 cm Lang staal by the steel version having a large ring over the breech. It makes that towards the breech, the diameter of the steel version decreases again. Furthermore, on the muzzle side of the trunnions, the steel version becomes smaller in abrupt steps, a consequence of the built-up construction. At the same place the bronze version has a regular decrease in diameter.

=== Transport ===
The 12 cm Lang brons was just as immobile as the steel version of the gun. Unlike the steel version, it was not repurposed to become a field gun.

== Operations ==
=== The steel 12 cm Lang becomes part of the field artillery ===
In December 1927 the siege artillery regiment ceased to exist as a unit. It was replaced by two regiments of dismounted artillery, one in Gorinchem, and one in Naarden. These contained the steel 15 cm and 12 cm Lang guns, which would be made more mobile, so they could serve as field artillery.

It is not clear what happened to the 12 cm Lang brons guns. It's clear that they did not become part of the army artillery, but it's not clear whether any further use was made of these guns.

== Sources ==
- Van Alles Wat (1880), "Medeelingen betreffende de Nederlandsche Artilerie", Militaire Spectator, Broese en Comp. Breda: 533–541
- Beijen (1877), "Hoofdstuk VIII, Tweede memorie van Beantwoording", Militaire Spectator, Bijblad, Broese en Comp. Breda: 20–31
- Enderlein (1876), "Begrooting van uitgaven voor de voltooiing van het vestingstelsel, dienst 1876", Militaire Spectator, Bijblad, Broese en Comp. Breda: 1–21
- Reuther (1880), "Staatsbegrooting voor het dienstjaar 1881", Militaire Spectator, Bijblad, Broese en Comp. Breda: 75–153
- Russer, A.S. (1898), Overzicht van de Inrichting en Bestemming der Vuurmonden van de Nederlandsche Landmacht, De Erven Loosjes, Haarlem, pp. 1–35, archived from the original on 2019-04-01
- Van der Schriek (1881), "Staatsbegrooting voor het dienstjaar 1882, voorlopig verslag der commissie van rapporteurs", Militaire Spectator, Bijblad, Broese en Comp. Breda: 405–424
- Staff Editor (1879), "De formules van Sarrau, ter berekening van de snelheid van beweging van het projectiel in de ziel en van de spanning der buskruitgassen", Militaire Spectator, Broese en Comp. Breda: 24–44
- Weitzel (1884), "Staatsbegrooting voor het dienstjaar 1884", Militaire Spectator, Bijblad, Broese en Comp. Breda: 1–35
- Wichers, H.O. (1879), "Staatsbegrooting voor het dienstjaar 1879", Militaire Spectator, Broese en Comp. Breda: 1–35
