= 8.4 cm Feldgeschütz Ord 1879 =

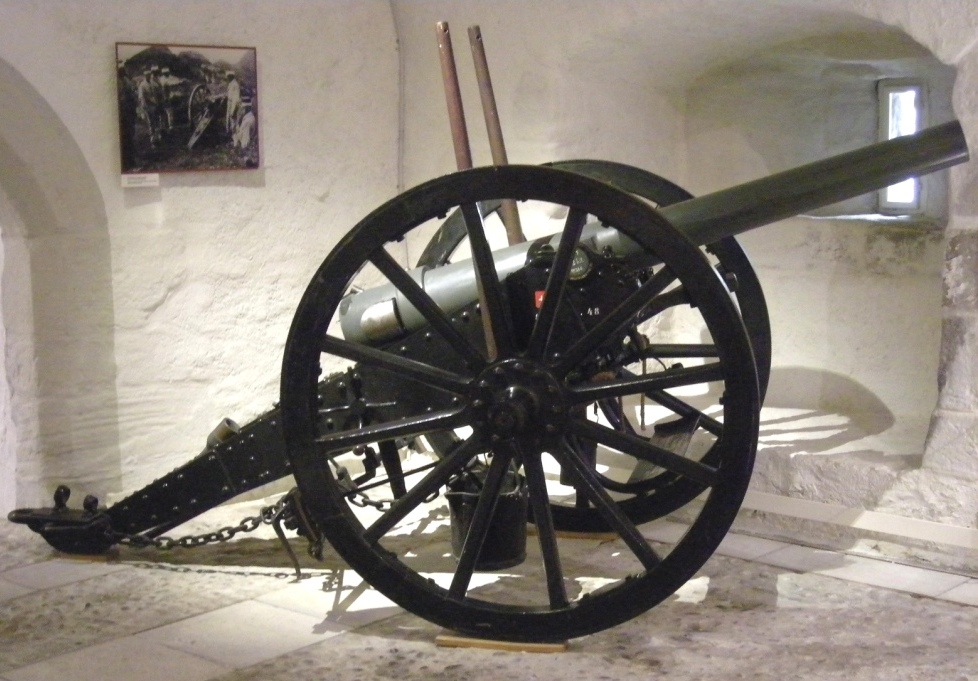
- 8.4 cm Feldgeschütz Ord 1879, in: Waadtländisches Militärmuseum Morges, Switzerland
- Type: Field gun
- Place of origin: Switzerland

Service history
- Used by: Swiss Armed Forces

Production history
- Manufacturer: Barrel: Krupp, Carriage: Eidg. Konstruktionswerkstätte, Thun
- No. built: 400

Specifications
- Mass: 425 kg
- Caliber: 8.4-centimetre (3.31 in)
- Muzzle velocity: 465 m/s

The 8.4 cm Feldgeschütz Ord 1879 is a 19th-century Swiss field gun. It replaced the 8.4 cm Feldgeschütz Ord 1871. The difference was that the Ord 1879 had a barrel of steel instead of bronze. The steel barrel was made by Krupp in Essen, Germany. The carriage was made by the Eidgenössische Konstruktionswerkstätte in Thun.

The gun was the last field gun without recoil mechanism in the Swiss army. In turn it was replaced by the Krupp 7.5 cm Model 1903. The gun continued to be employed in fortresses till the end of World War II.

== Evolution, History ==
=== Preceding 8.4 cm Feldkanone Ord 1871 and Dutch 8 cm A. Bronze ===
After the Franco-Prussian War the Swiss developed a number of breech-loading guns. Amongst these was the 8.4 cm Feldkanone Ord 1871, a rifled breechloader field gun with a bronze barrel. In total 358 pieces were ordered in 1871. Also in 1871, the Dutch army bought one of these guns, and started to produce it locally in 1874. In the Netherlands the 8.4 cm Feldgeschütz Ord 1871 would become known as the 8 cm A. Bronze.

=== The 8.4 cm Feldgeschütz Ord 1879 ===
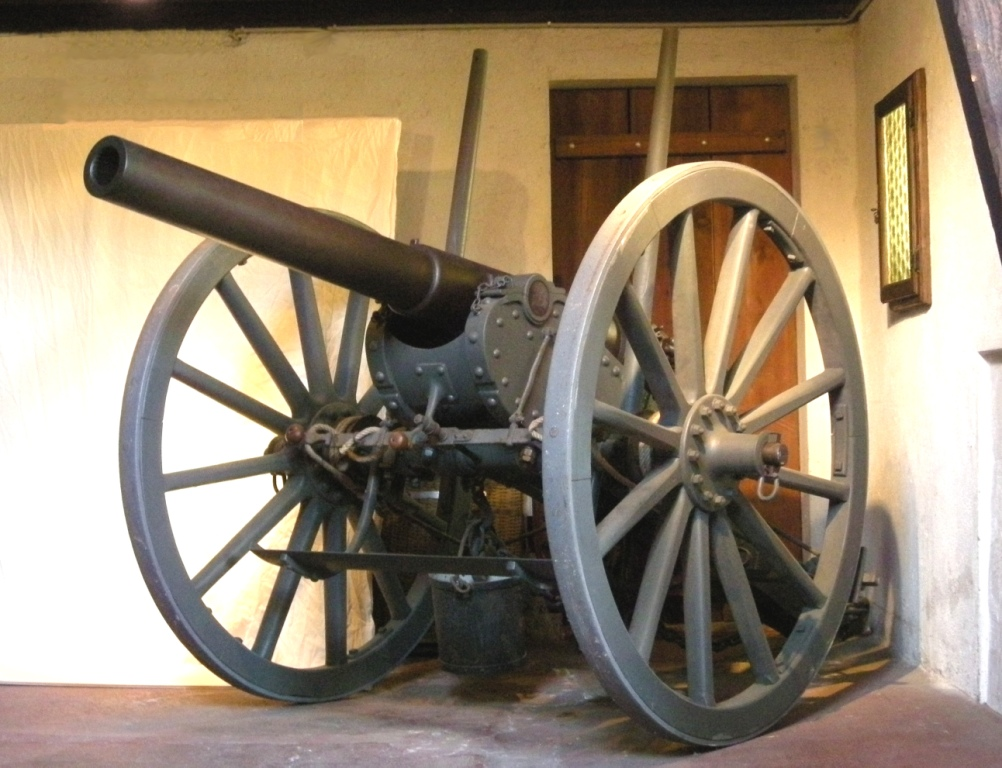
8.4 cm Feldgeschütz Ord 1879

In the 1870s there was a strong debate about whether bronze was still suitable for gun barrels. Already in 1874 two massive steel barrels of 84 mm caliber were procured from Krupp for testing purposes. These massive steel barrels showed that with equal weight, the steel guns could take heavier charges and wore down more slowly. The next step was the procurement of a built-up gun barrel (Ringrohr) from Krupp in 1878, again for testing. The Artillery committee and Ministry of Defense reported favorably about this barrel.

On 24 April 1878 the Federal Council then decided to modernize the field artillery by adopting the Krupp barrel. It was mounted on the carriages of the 8.4 cm Feldkanone Ord 1871 without any modification. In 1879 the first 15 8.4 cm Feldkanone Ord 1879's were delivered. The old bronze barrels Ord 1871 were handed over to the Festungsartillerie, or recast. Steel guns had already been introduced in the Swiss army in 1877 when the Krupp breechloader 7,5-cm-Gebirgskanone Ord 1877 replaced the Gebirgskanone Ord 1864.

=== The Dutch 8 cm staal ===
The Dutch government had the same doubts as the Swiss about bronze guns. By 1879 the Dutch government had decided that their 8 cm bronze guns would be replaced by either steel or a steel bronze guns. Meanwhile three steel bronze guns were constructed in the second half of 1879. In 1880 the Dutch trial with steel bronze guns for the army failed unexpectedly. In 1880 the defense minister then decided to buy a 84 mm gun from Krupp. It would become known as 8 cm staal. It had the same 84 mm caliber as the 8.4 cm Feldgeschütz Ord 1879, but it was a bit longer and had another breech. The 8 staal also had a steel carriage.

=== The 8.4 cm Positionskanonen 1887 L 25 ===
When Franz von Uchatius invented steel bronze, many countries reverted to using bronze for guns. Bronze was cheaper, and easier to manufacture, meaning that these countries were no longer dependent on foreign countries for manufacturing guns. In 1882 two steel bronze barrels were ordered at Sulzer. Tests of these barrels were positive, and so in January 1887 it was decided to procure 56 of these for the newly organized leichte Positionsartillerie (light siege batteries). The steel bronze version was placed on a fortification carriage that also fit the other 8.4 cm guns. The breech of this 8.4 cm Positionskanonen 1887 L 25 equaled that of the 8.4 cm Feldkanone Ord 1871. Due to a somewhat higher elevation it had somewhat more range. In order to absorb recoil it rolled back and upward on rails, and was returned to its position by gravity.

=== Gradual replacement ===
After the introduction of the 7,5-cm-Feldkanone 1903 L 30 the first 8.4 cm Feldkanone Ord 1879 (1881/93) were handed over to the fortress troops. In August 1940 97 were handed to this part of the armed forces. At the end of World War II, 18 were still in service.

== Characteristics ==
=== Barrel ===
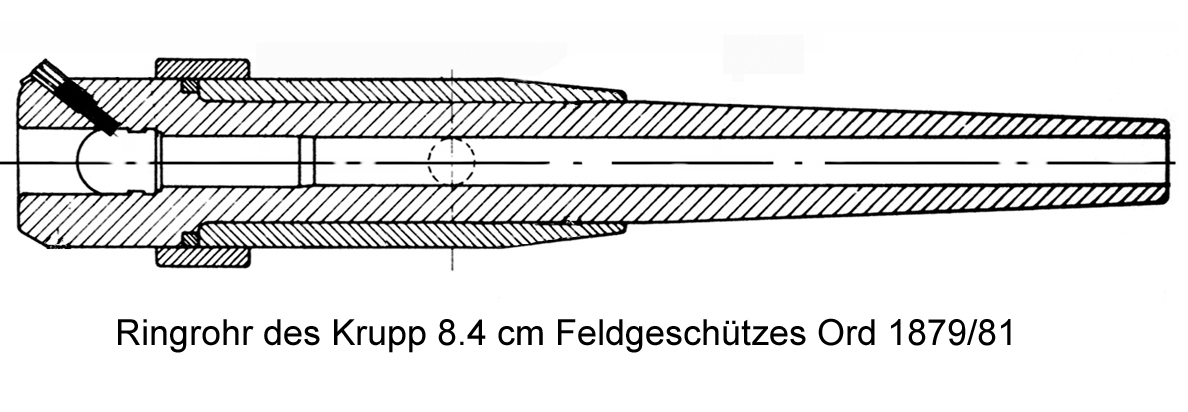
Built-up gun barrel of 8.4 cm Feldgeschützes 1879

The 8.4 cm Feldgeschütz Ord 1879 (later: Ord 1881/93) weighed 1,100 kg ready to fire. The Krupp barrel was a built-up gun. The inner tube had a breech, and was coiled with two other layers. In total, the barrel and breech weighed 425 kg. The outer length of the barrel was 25.6 caliber, or 2150 mm. On the inside the length till the breech was 1930 mm. The barrel had 24 grooves, increasing from 0 to 4 degrees. The breech was closed with a Broadwell Ring. This ring was pressed forward on closure, and then pressed back by the explosion, preventing the escape of poisonous gasses.

The gun was fired by a Reibschlagröhre, which was inserted above the breech. The Reibschlagröhre was ignited by pulling the line. From 1882 this ignition system was replaced by the Gressly percussion system. With this system an ignition casing was inserted in the lock on the side of the breech. A canal allowed the sparks to reach the powder in the barrel. The recoil of the gun was 10 m. The use of the recoil brake system 'Lemoine' limited this to 4 m.

=== Carriage ===
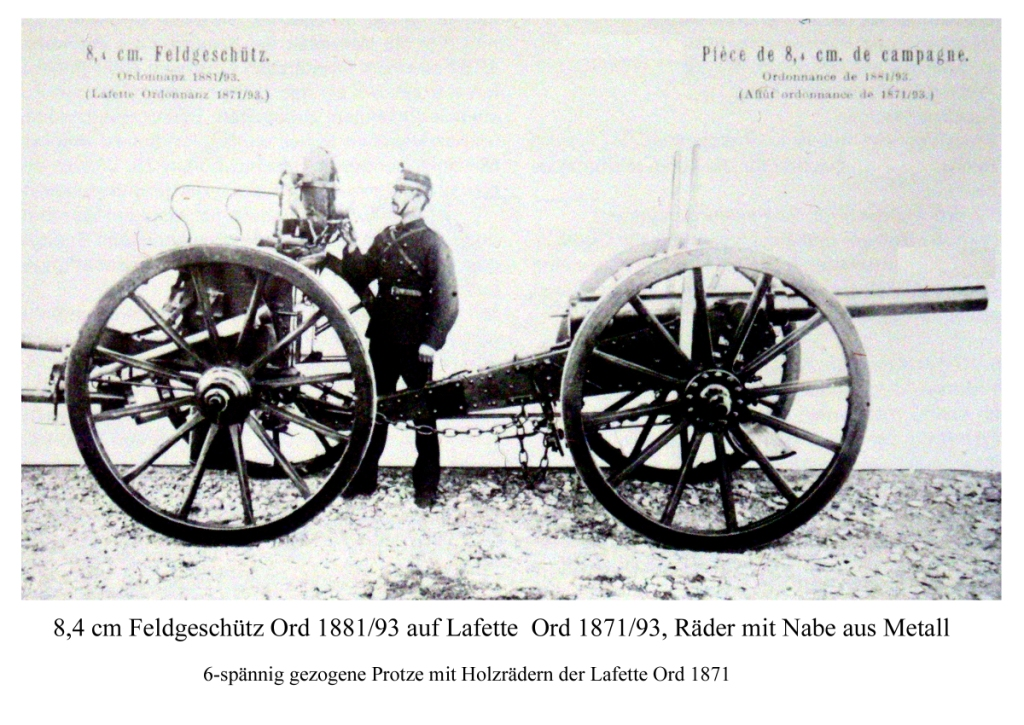
8.4 cm limber and cart

The gun was mounted on an iron carriage with a steel axle, and wooden wheels with iron tires. There were two brackets of sheet iron which converged to the point where the gun was towed. The gun was fixed with its trunnions fitting into two semi-circular openings in the brackets. These were then locked shut with a semi-circular iron clasp. Between the brackets there was a small trail-box. The elevation screw came up from the carriage to a point below the breech of the gun. The screw was operated by a hand-wheel situated on the outer face of the right bracket. The gun carriage did not allow for sideways movement of the barrel. Taking aim was done by shifting the rear of the carriage. To gain leverage, one of the poles sticking upwards on the side of the barrel (see e.g. the photo of the gun in the Waadtländisches Militärmuseum Morges) was placed in an opening at the end of the carriage.

During transport two gunners stood on foot boards that were fixed to the gun carriage, and held on to these poles. One of the gunners handled the brake. The total length of the gun and carriage was 3,5 m, width (on the axels) 1,7 m, track 1,4 m. The diameter of the wheels was 1,44 m. The barrel was 1,13 m above the ground. In service with the siege artillery, the gun was mounted on multiple siege carriages.

=== Limber ===
During transport the gun was towed by a two-wheeled limber. The limber was also made of iron. It had a wrought iron axle, and wooden wheels with iron tires. The ammunition box was made of pine covered with tin, and was strengthened at the corners. It was divided into three compartments. The two outer ones for projectiles, the inner one for cartridges, fuzes, etc. The arm rests were of iron and attached to the lid of the box, which opened towards the horses. The weight of the limber without ammunition was 457 kg, fully equipped this was 783 kg.

=== Transport ===
Limber and carriage were pulled by six horses. The gun's crew consisted of a chief and 6 gunners. The limber carried 2-3 men, two others were on the carriage.

== Capabilities ==
=== Range ===
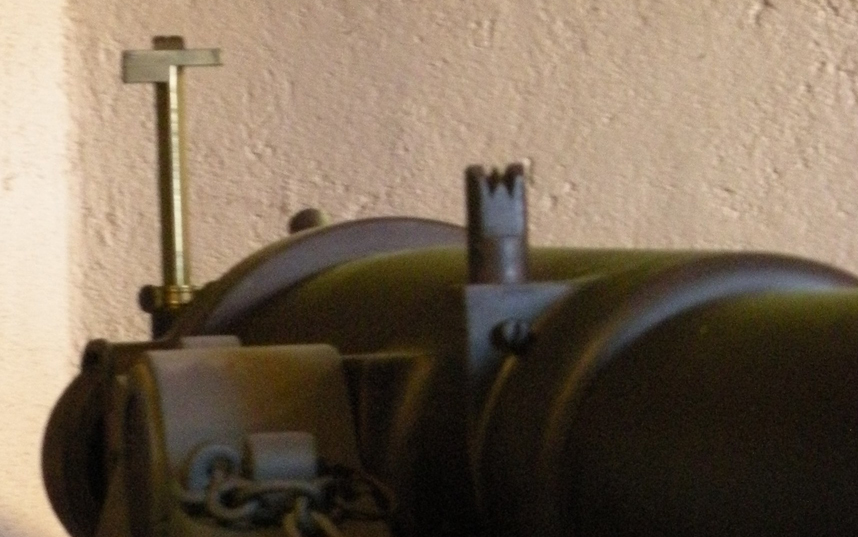
8.4 cm direct aim sight

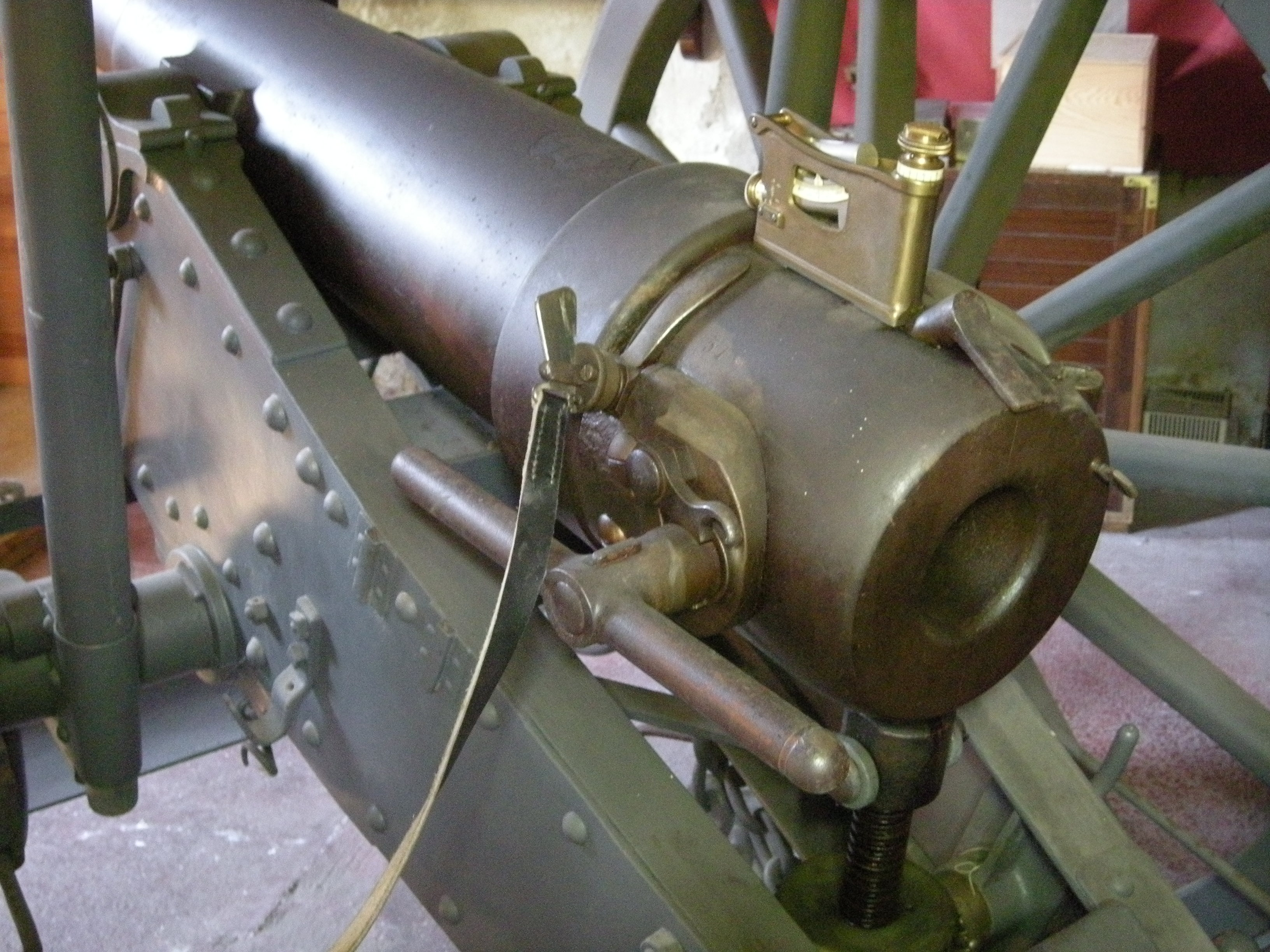
Corrodi-Quadrant Ord 1895, ignition line at breech

With a standard charge of 1.4 kg black gunpowder the initial velocity of a 6.7 kg grenade was 458 m/s. The same effect could be reached with a smaller charge of Blättchenpulver Ord. 1893. This gave a standard range of 5000 m. Shrapnel shot had the same velocity, but range was limited to 3400 m, later 4200 m due to the time fuses used. As a siege gun, the 8.4 cm Feldgeschütz was mounted on other carriages. These did not limit the elevation to 18.5 degrees. Therefore, in indirect fire and with modern ammunition, range could be increased to 7 km. Some guns were mounted on fixed pivot emplacements with shields in order to defend at close range.

=== Accuracy ===
The direct aim mechanism consisted of a sight. It was a bar that was fixed on top of the breech, and could be elevated from 0 to 15.5 degrees. It could be moved 25 per mille to the left and 20 per mille to the right. The other end of this iron sights was 1 m forward. For indirect aim a Quadrant was used, from 1895 this was the Corrodi-Quadrant. It was on top of the breech, and could be tuned from 15.6 to 34 degrees, even though this did not reflect the gun's possible elevation. Elevation was about 18.5 degrees maximum. The range could be lowered by lowering the charge. The Artilleriepromille had been decreed in 1870. 1600 per mille equaled 90 degrees.

== Ammunition ==
The 8.4 cm Feldgeschütz Ord 1879 was able to use the ammunition, or rather the shot, which had been made for the preceding 8.4 cm Feldkanone Ord 1871. Initially the ammunition was loaded separately. After the adoption of the grenade, the powder charge was loaded by means of a bag made of damp proof silken material. Next, the breech was closed and the Reibschlagröhre inserted. From 1882 the Gressly lock and an ignition case were used.

The first shell made for the Feldkanone Ord 1879 was a ring shell (Ringgranate obus à anneaux) of cylindro-ogival form. It had two rings. The foremost had a diameter equal to the caliber of the gun, the hindermost to the diameter in the grooving. The cast iron shell was double walled, the inner wall being composed of 12 ten-toothed rings. It weighed 6,230 kg. Empty wright was 6,000 kg, the explosive charge 140 g gunpowder No. 5. This common shell was detonated with a percussion fuze.

The shrapnel shot was of the same form, but its head was blunter. Instead of the front ring, the front of the shell itself was of caliber width. The head was of cast iron, the cylindrical portion and base were made of steel. The head was screwed onto the base and had a channel for the fuze. It held 185 hardened lead bullets of 12.5 g. Its explosive charge at the base weighed 64 g. This shrapnel shell was detonated with a time fuze.

From 1890 shrapnel shots combined propellant and shot in a cartridge. In 1933 the pointed grenade with immediate ignition of the siege artillery was introduced. It weighed 6,9 kg, and was loaded with 922 g Trotyl. It had a range of 7000 m.

== Gallery ==
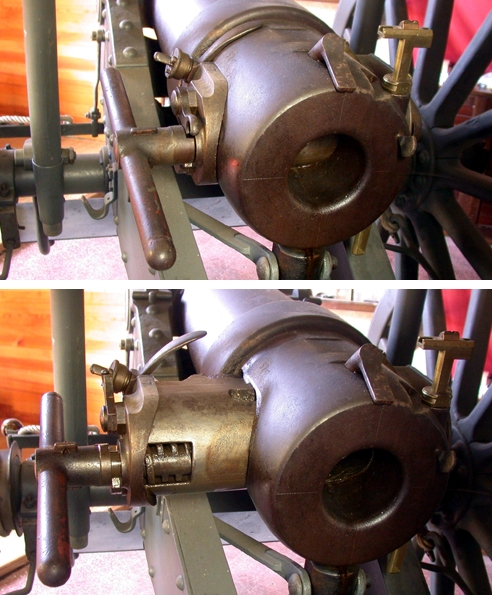
Rundkeilverschluss of 8.4 cm Feldgeschützes 1879

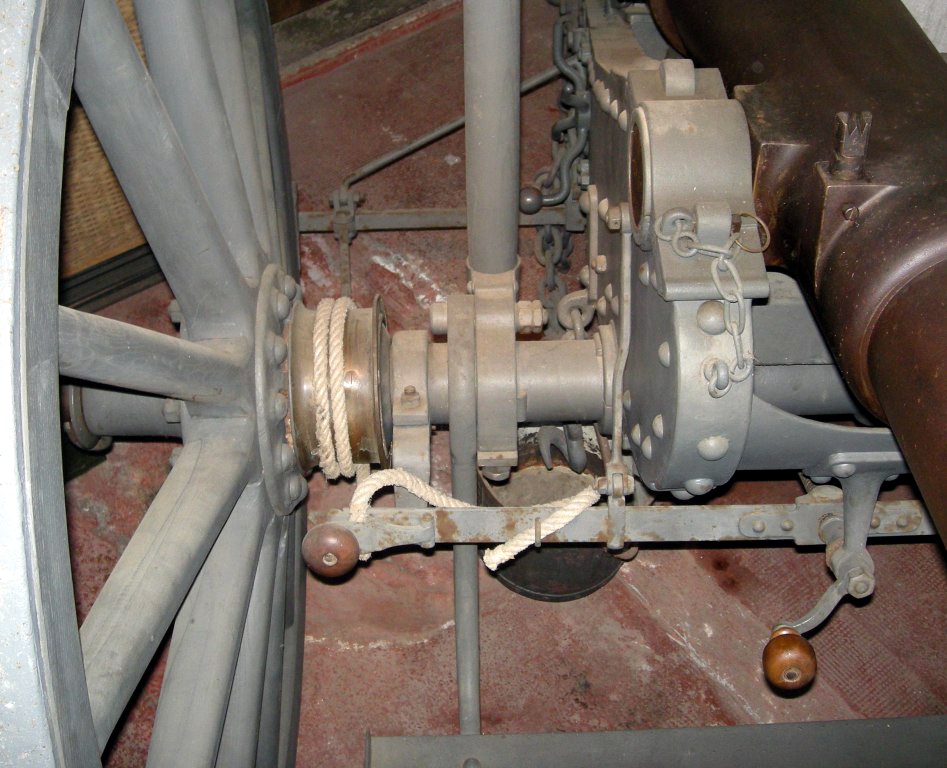
8.4 cm Feldgeschütz, recoil brake mechanism Lemoine

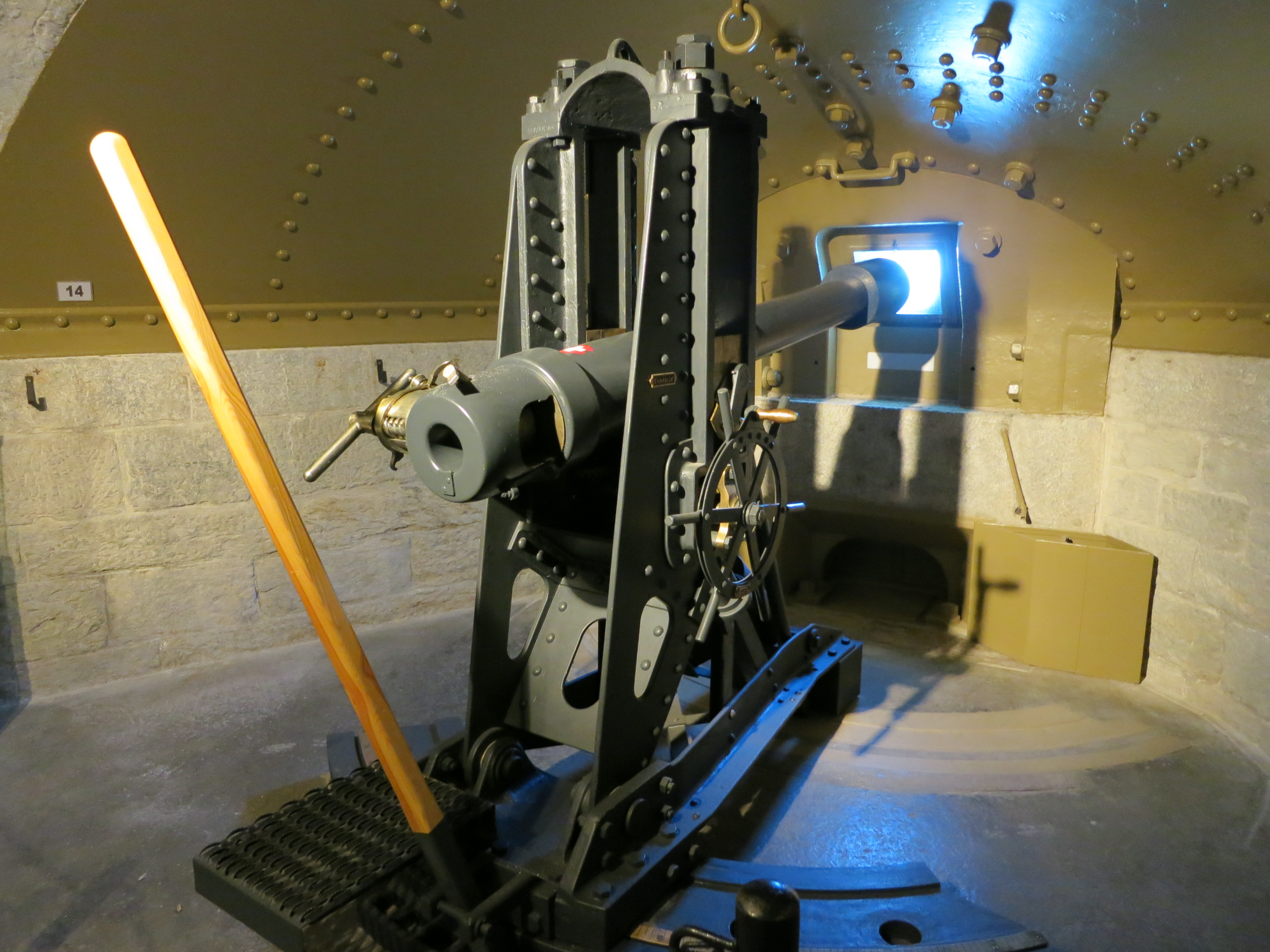
8.4-cm-Ringrohrkanone Modell 1880 on Minimalscharten carriage, Fort Airolo

== Sources ==
- Bowdler Bell, C.W. (1889), The armed strength of Switzerland, War Office, intelligence division
- Reuther (1880), "Staatsbegrooting voor het dienstjaar 1881", Militaire Spectator, Bijblad, Broese en Comp. Breda: 75–153
- Revue Militaire (1879), "Nouveau Matériel de l'Artillerie de Campagne suisse", Revue Militaire Suisse (10), Adrien Borgeaud, Lausanne: 225–227
- Van Alles Wat (1880), "Medeelingen betreffende de Nederlandsche Artilerie", Militaire Spectator, Broese en Comp. Breda: 533–541
- Wichers, H.O. (1879), "Staatsbegrooting voor het dienstjaar 1879", Militaire Spectator, Broese en Comp. Breda: 1–35
- Jean de Montet: Les Bouches à Feu de l’Artillerie Suisse. Edition du Centre d’Histoire, Lausanne 1980.
- Walter Betschmann: Artillerie I, Geschütze der Artillerie ohne mechanischen Rohrrücklauf. Verlag Stocker-Schmid, Dietikon-Zürich, ISBN 3-7276-7009-6
- Carl Hiltebrand: Zeughaus-Chronik Thun 1857–1982. Lang Druck AG, Liebefeld/Bern 1982.
- Albert Brunisholz, Carl Hiltebrandt: Die Geschichte der Kriegsmaterialverwaltung 1850–1975. Lang Druck AG, Liebefeld/Bern 1975.
