= 15 cm Lang staal L/24 =

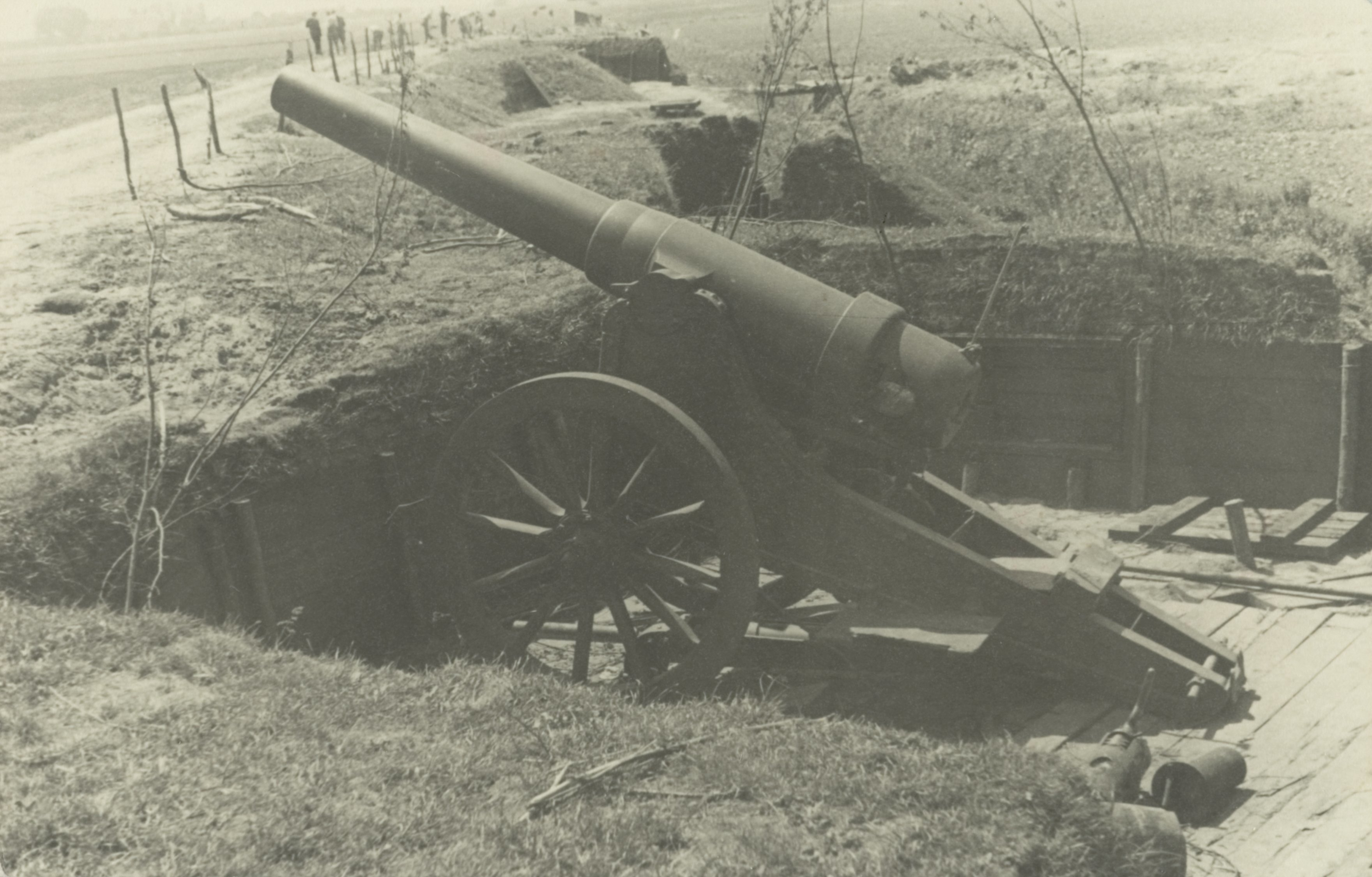
- 15 cm Lang staal L/24 in 1940
- Type: Siege gun
- Place of origin: Netherlands

Service history
- In service: 1878
- Used by: Royal Netherlands Army

Production history
- Manufacturer: Krupp
- Unit cost: 23,030 guilders
- No. built: 75

Specifications
- Mass: 3,045 kg (barrel)
- Length: 3.6 m
- Caliber: 14.91 cm

The 15 cm Lang staal L/24 was a Dutch rifled breechloading steel siege gun made by Krupp.

== Context ==
=== The name 15 cm Lang staal L/24 ===
The Dutch army had a rather efficient naming system for its artillery. The 15 cm Lang staal L/24 was at first known as '15 cm zwaar' in order to distinguish it from a planned '15 cm licht'. When many more breechloading guns appeared in the Dutch Army's inventory, it added an 'A' for Achterlader (breechloader) to distinguish these from the smoothbore or rifled muzzle loaders. When steel and bronze guns of the same caliber appeared, it added the label staal (steel) to distinguish the 8 cm staal, 12 cm Lang staal and this gun as '15 cm Lang staal' from other guns. At first this gun was therefore simply known as '15 cm zwaar', later it became the '15 cm Lang staal'. However, within a few years, even longer guns of the same caliber appeared among the coastal artillery. Therefore, the Dutch army added the length in calibers (L/24) in order to keep these apart. In fact they did this only for the long guns, and by replacing the label 'Lang' with the exact length in calibers. While all long guns of 15 cm and longer were made of steel, the label 'staal' was omitted for these guns, leading to the name 15 cm L/24. Still later, when the gun became part of the field army, there was a renewed preference for the name 15 cm Lang staal, to designate it as an old gun, but the designation 15 cm L/24 was also used. Hence the name 15 cm Lang staal L/24.

=== The failed 15 cm A. brons ===
In 1872 the Minister for War was busy modernizing the rifles of the infantry. For artillery he had a 24 cm gun in production. He expected that a 15 cm gun breechloading gun would be ready in 1872, and be tested before the end of the year, so production of 15 cm guns could start in early 1873. He planned to construct 25 15 cm guns in 1873. In total, 120 15 cm A. brons were thought to be required.

Much later, in November 1880 the House of Representatives asked why 10 15 cm A. brons had disappeared from the army's inventory. The Minister of War answered that these were 10 15 cm breechloaders made (i.e. cast) from regular bronze in 1871 and 1872. Only one had been completed. The other 9 had not been rifled, nor been provided with a breech lock. Trials had ended after the decision to buy steel siege guns. The 15 cm A. brons's had then been designated to be melted down.

== Procurement ==
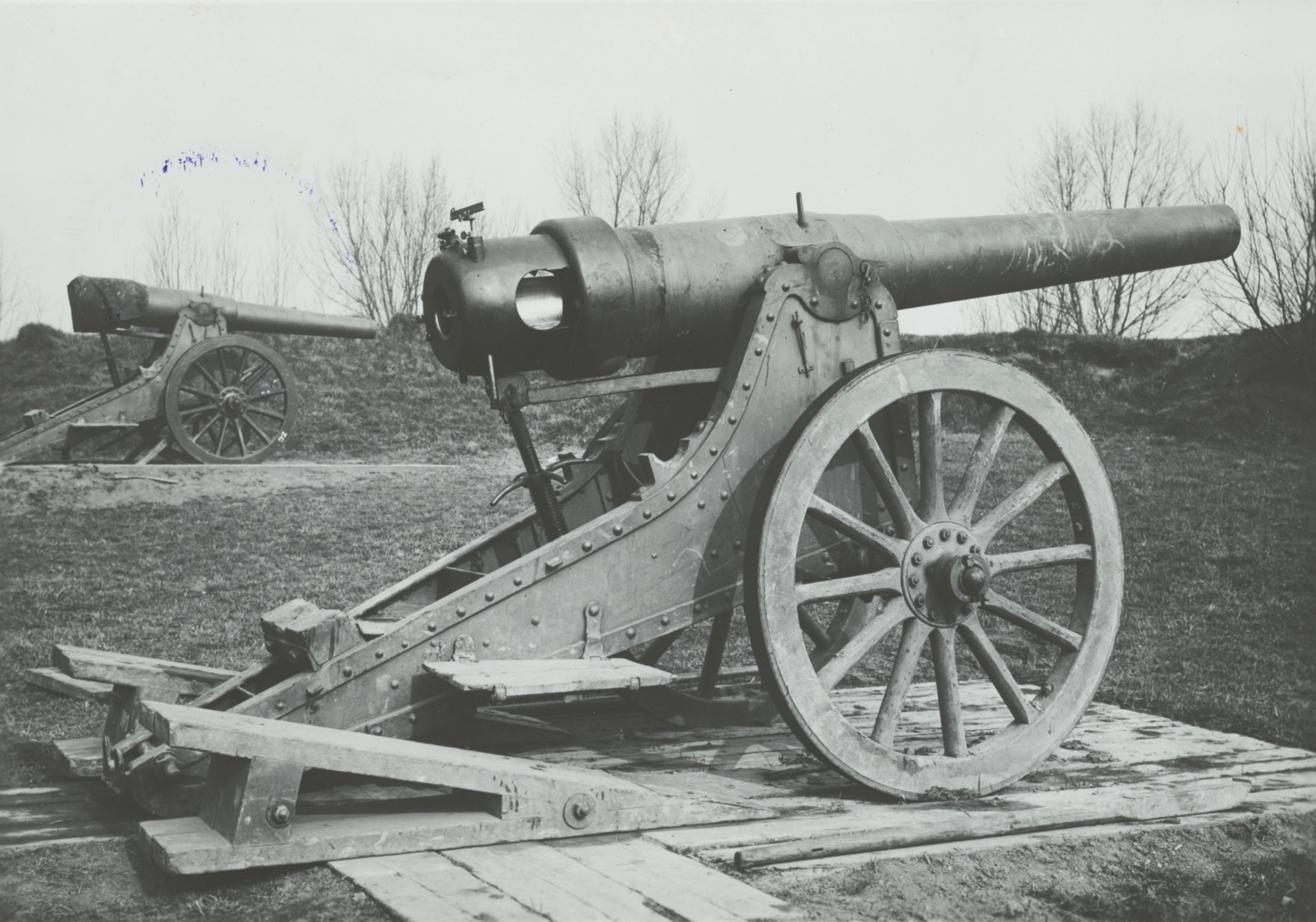
Dutch gun 15 cm Lang L/24 staal showing transport trunnion recesses.

=== Procurement of 15 cm Lang staal L/24 ===
By 1875 it was clear that in a direct artillery duel, the Dutch bronze guns would be at a severe disadvantage against the newest steel guns. Therefore, these bronze guns would have to be supplemented with a number of steel (staal) guns. For 1876, the plan for the siege artillery was to procure 40 15 cm Lang staal L/24 ('15 cm zwaar staal') guns at 22,570 guilders a piece all included, 20 12 cm Lang staal at 13,200 guilders a piece ditto, and 100 bronze 12 cm K.A. at 3,825 guilders a piece ditto. For trials of the foreseen guns, single steel guns of 15 cm, 12 cm, and 8.7 cm(!) were bought in 1875.

In December 1875 the Minister of War declared that the inclusion of the 8,7 cm under the siege artillery was a mistake. Even while the procurement was urgent, no more than 40 15 cm zwaar staal guns, and 20 12 cm Lang staal siege guns to be ordered at Krupp were brought on the budget for 1876. It was sound practice to limit the first series, and it was not even clear whether Krupp could deliver more. The trials would serve to specify alterations which would make the guns fit with the rest of the Dutch equipment.

In September 1876 trials with the 15 cm zwaar staal and 12 cm Lang staal were held at the Krupp trial grounds. The results were very positive. In light of the trials at the Krupp grounds, the Minister of War then decided to contract with Krupp. However, for the money that was voted on the 1876 budget, he bought less 15 cm zwaar staal guns and more 12 cm Lang staal guns. The House of Representatives was not amused, and wanted to know how many guns had been bought at Krupp for which price. In December 1876 the minister replied that the state had 20 15 cm zwaar staal guns and 60 12 cm Lang staal guns on order at Krupp. The 12 cm Lang staal gun would cost 15,310 mark, same price as before. For 1877 the Minister of War then asked money for 100 12 cm Lang staal, i.e. did not order anymore 15 cm Lang staal L/24.

In November 1877 the Minister of War deemed 124 15 cm Lang staal still to be required for the first line of the new Dutch Water Line. 22 had already been bought on the budgets for 1876 and 1877. Therefore, the minister asked for money for 54 more guns on the 1878 budget. On the final budget for 1879, a new Minister of War only asked budget for the lighter 12 cm guns. On 1 January 1880 there were 75 15 cm Lang staal available in the Netherlands.

== Characteristics ==
=== Barrel ===
The barrel of the 15 cm Lang staal L/24 was made by Krupp. It was a built-up gun barrel. It was 3,6 m long and weighed 3,045 kg. The caliber was 149.1 mm at the muzzle. The powder chamber was 42.5 cm long, and had a diameter of 151.1 mm.

What makes the 15 cm Lang staal L/24 hard to discern from the 12 cm Lang staal, is that both had a caliber of 24.

=== Carriage ===
The carriage of the 15 cm Lang staal L/24 was made of steel, and was also made by Krupp. For transport the barrel would be placed in a lower position on the carriage.

=== Transport ===
The 15 cm Lang staal L/24 was envisioned as a siege gun, which would dismount enemy siege artillery.

== Capabilities ==
The first serious tests of the gun were done by Krupp in Dülmen in June 1875. With a charge of 6.2 kg of prismatic powder, and a projectile of 28.4 kg, the average velocity was 470.9 m/s at 50 meters from the muzzle with a pressure of 1,939 atm. With 6.2 kg of another kind of gunpowder it was 412.8 m/s and a pressure of 1,296 atm. A third type of powder gave a speed of 451 m/s and a pressure of 1,420 atm. The first kind of powder gave the highest velocity.

In the subsequent Dutch trials, which started in April 1876 many kinds of gunpowder were tested. Most of it was coarse gunpowder of about 350 grains per kg. Krupp had determined that the gas pressure inside the gun should not exceed 2,200 atm, and that a suitable gunpowder should propel the projectile to at least 465 m/s at 50 m from the muzzle. That is, the speed of the 15 cm should be equal to that of the 12 cm, but it could withstand a higher pressure.

The next round of Dutch tests was done with a new set of two guns, which had grooves inside the chamber, and of which the 15 cm gun fired a heavier 31.3 kg projectile. With a charge of 6.8 kg a velocity of 465.4 m/s was achieved at a pressure of 2,180 atm. With 6.9 kg this was 468.3 m/s, at a pressure of 2,070 atm. It led to establishing that the regular charge of the gun would be 6.8 kg.

The trials were then invalidated by a change that was made to the guns as a result of trials in Germany. The change was that the angle of the grooves was changed from constant to progressive. After some tests, the commission noted very significant differences with regard to atmospheric pressure in July. In particular, it had the first 15 cm gun fired again, and with the same 6.8 kg charge as above, it now noted a speed of 474.5 m/s at a pressure of 2,410 atm. After many investigations, it was found that in warm weather there was a slight increase in velocity, and a much higher increase in gas pressure inside the guns.

Later in the trials, the regular charge of the 15 cm Lang staal L/24 was established to be 6.0 kg black gunpowder. With that charge there was no danger of ignition of the explosive charge of the projectile itself. Initial velocity with the 6.0 kg black gunpowder charge was 428.8 m/s.

== Operations ==
=== Becomes part of the field artillery and is retired ===
In 1927 the fortification artillery regiment was disbanded. From its remains two regiments of Onbereden Artillerie (unmounted artillery) were formed. In times of war, the first regiment of dismounted artillery would form 6 artillery regiments. These were the 13th, 18th, 14th, and 19th artillery regiments armed with the 12 cm Lang staal, and the 20th and 21st Artillery Regiments armed with the 15 cm Lang staal L/24. On 1 April 1933 the first dismounted artillery regiment was disbanded. Training for the 15 cm Lang staal L/24 ceased, and the 20th and 21st artillery regiments were deleted from the war time organization. The 15 cm Lang staal L/24 guns were then put in storage.

=== World War II ===
During the mobilization for World War II the 15 cm Lang staal L/24 was brought out of storage. Three new artillery regiments of only one company (Artillerie Afdeling) were founded. These were the units: 24 AA, 25 AA and 26 AA. Each had three batteries of 4 15 cm Lang staal L/24, but no traction. 25 AA was actively engaged in the fight near Moerdijk. Four of its 12 guns permanently broke down due to mechanical defects. For multiple reasons, the fire of the guns was almost completely ineffective. 26 AA was in Numansdorp. When the enemy did not appear before its guns, it had to move. After the orders were given, and horses were collected etc. two days had passed, and the army had surrendered.
