= 12 cm Lang staal =

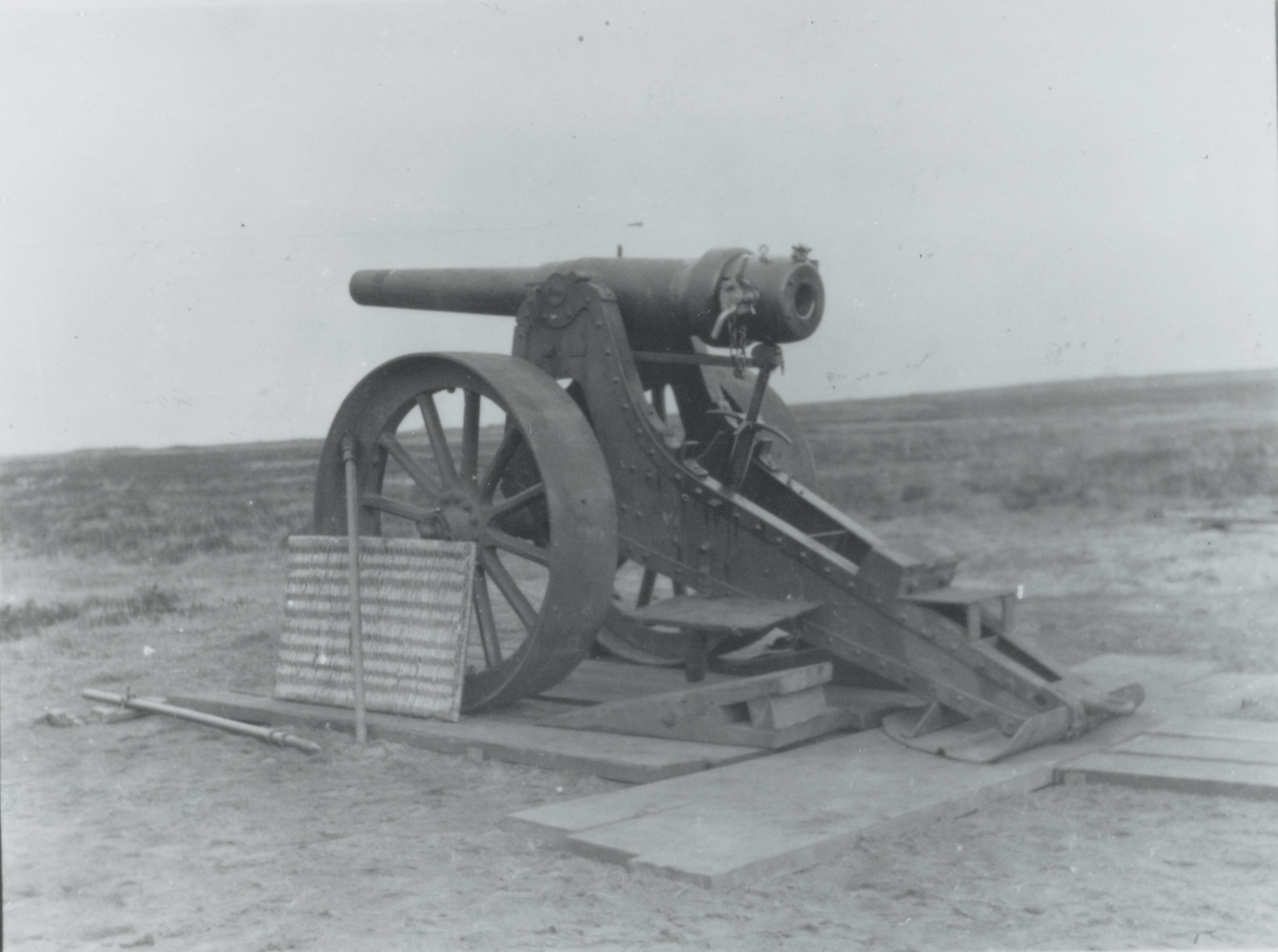
- A 12 cm Lang staal in 1939-1940
- Type: Siege artillery
- Place of origin: Germany; Switzerland

Service history
- In service: 1880-1940
- Used by: Netherlands
- Wars: World War II

Production history
- Designer: Krupp
- Manufacturer: Krupp
- No. built: 158

Specifications
- Mass: 1,420 kg (barrel).
- Length: 2,925 mm
- Caliber: 120 mm
- Rate of fire: 1.5 shots per minute
- Muzzle velocity: 394 m/s.
- Effective firing range: 7,500 m in 1928

The 12 cm Lang staal was a 19th century Dutch siege gun made by Krupp. It was used by the Dutch field artillery in World War II.

== Context ==
=== The Dutch army adopts breechloading ===
The Franco-Prussian War, and the subsequent establishment of the German empire scared the Dutch government. Suddenly, the long neglected army got a lot of attention. However, decades of neglect could not be remedied in a few years. The most urgent measures consisted of procuring breechloading rifles and guns, which had been successfully used in that war. Meanwhile, the construction of fortresses and super heavy artillery for coastal defense against armored ships took a huge chunk out of the budgets. In these circumstances, procurement of the bronze 12 cm K.A. and 8 cm A. brons was a step in the right direction. This was also the case because they were produced domestically for a modest price, starting in 1874.

=== Procurement of steel guns ===
By 1875 it was clear that in a direct artillery duel, the Dutch bronze guns would be at a severe disadvantage against the newest steel guns. Therefore, these bronze guns would have to be supplemented with a number of steel (staal) guns. For 1876, the plan for the siege artillery was to procure 40 15 cm Lang staal L/24 (15 cm zwaar staal) guns at 22,570 guilders a piece all included, 20 12 cm Lang staal at 13,200 guilders a piece ditto, and 100 12 cm K.A. brons at 3,825 guilders a piece ditto. For trials of the foreseen guns, single steel guns of 15 cm, 12 cm, and 8.7 cm(!) were bought in 1875. In December 1875 the Minister of War declared that the inclusion of the 8,7 cm under the siege artillery was a mistake. Even while the procurement was urgent, no more than 40 15 cm zwaar staal guns, and 20 12 cm Lang staal siege guns to be ordered at Krupp were brought on the budget for 1876. It was sound practice to limit the first series, and it was not even clear whether Krupp could deliver more. The trials would serve to specify alterations which would make the guns fit with the rest of the Dutch equipment.

In December 1875, 833 guns of 12 cm Lang were thought to be needed, while 585 12 cm Lang were present on 1 January 1875. From the context it can be derived that 12 cm Lang referred to 12 cm Long guns in general, and that many of these were simply 12-pounder smooth bore muzzle loaders.

=== The 12 cm Lang staal is ordered ===
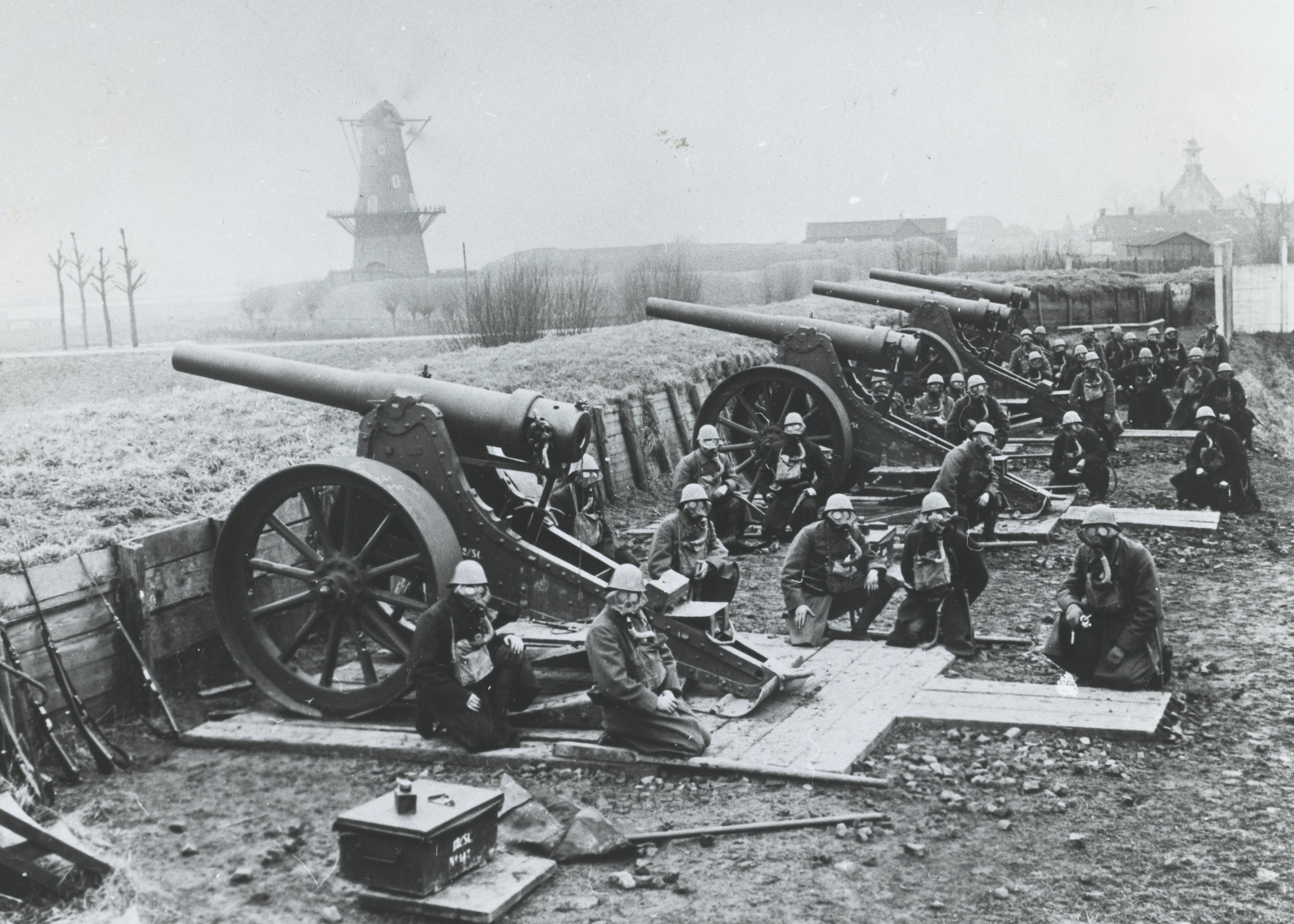
Battery of Dutch 12 cm Lang staal siege guns in Gorinchem c 1928-1930.

In September 1876 trials with the 15 cm zwaar staal and 12 cm Lang staal were held at the Krupp trial grounds. The results were very positive. Meanwhile, comparative trials in the Netherlands between the 8 cm A. Brons and the Krupp 8,7 mm steel breechloader led the artillery committee to recommend steel field guns. In light of the trials at the Krupp grounds, the Minister of War then decided to contract with Krupp. However, for the money that was voted on the 1876 budget, he bought less 15 cm zwaar staal guns and more 12 cm Lang staal guns. The House of Representatives was not amused, and wanted to know how many guns had been bought at Krupp for which price. In December 1876 the minister replied that the state had 20 15 cm zwaar staal guns and 60 12 cm Lang staal guns on order at Krupp. The 12 cm Lang staal gun would cost 7,980 mark, same price as before. For 1877 the Minister of War then asked money for 100 12 cm Lang staal.

In November 1877 the Minister of War deemed 132 12 cm Lang staal to be required for the first line of the new Dutch Water Line. 62 had already been bought on the budgets for 1876 and 1877. Therefore, the minister asked for money for 57 more guns on the 1878 budget. On the final budget for 1879, a new Minister of War asked budget for 40 12 cm Lang staal, and little else. On 1 January 1880 there were 126 12 cm Lang staal available in the Netherlands. 32 still had to be delivered.

=== The 12 cm Lang brons ===
In 1880 a new steel bronze gun, the 12 cm Lang brons appeared. 60 were planned to be made by the Rijks Geschutgieterij (national gun foundry) in the Hague in 1880. The cost difference between the versions was 3,200 guilders per gun, while 193 12 cm Lang were still thought to be required. The switch to producing the 12 cm Lang brons meant that the minister put an end to the procurement of more 12 cm Lang staal from Krupp.

This is indeed what happened. On 1 January 1883 the available total of both steel and steel bronze 12 cm Lang was 248. 12 more 12 cm Lang brons would still be delivered. At least 105 more 12 cm Lang were thought to be required.

=== Gradual replacement ===
The 12 cm Lang staal quickly became obsolete after 1897. In that year the Canon de 75 modèle 1897, the first gun with a recoil mechanism was introduced.

== Characteristics ==
=== Barrel ===
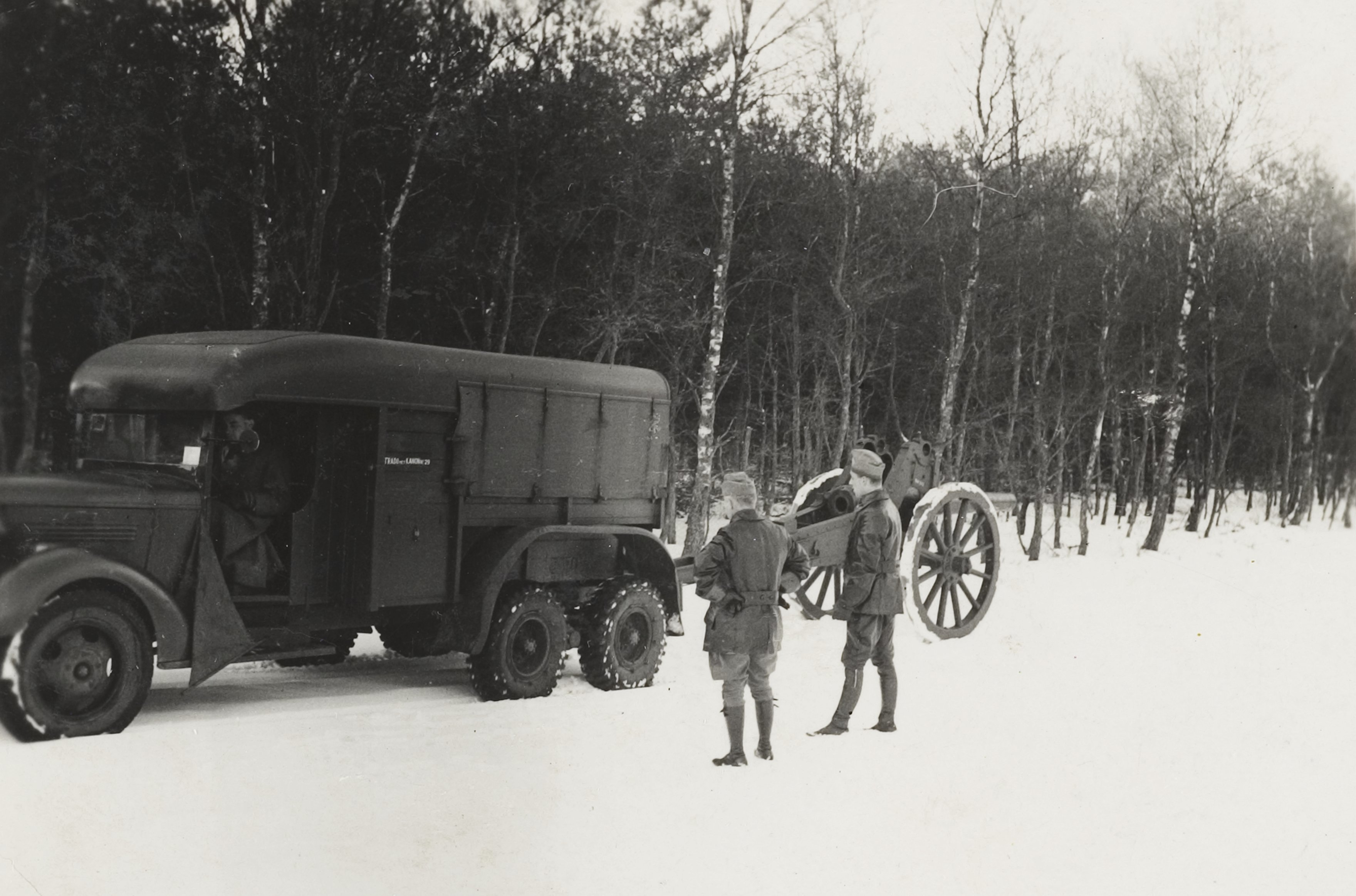
12 cm Lang staal gun in transport mode c. 1940

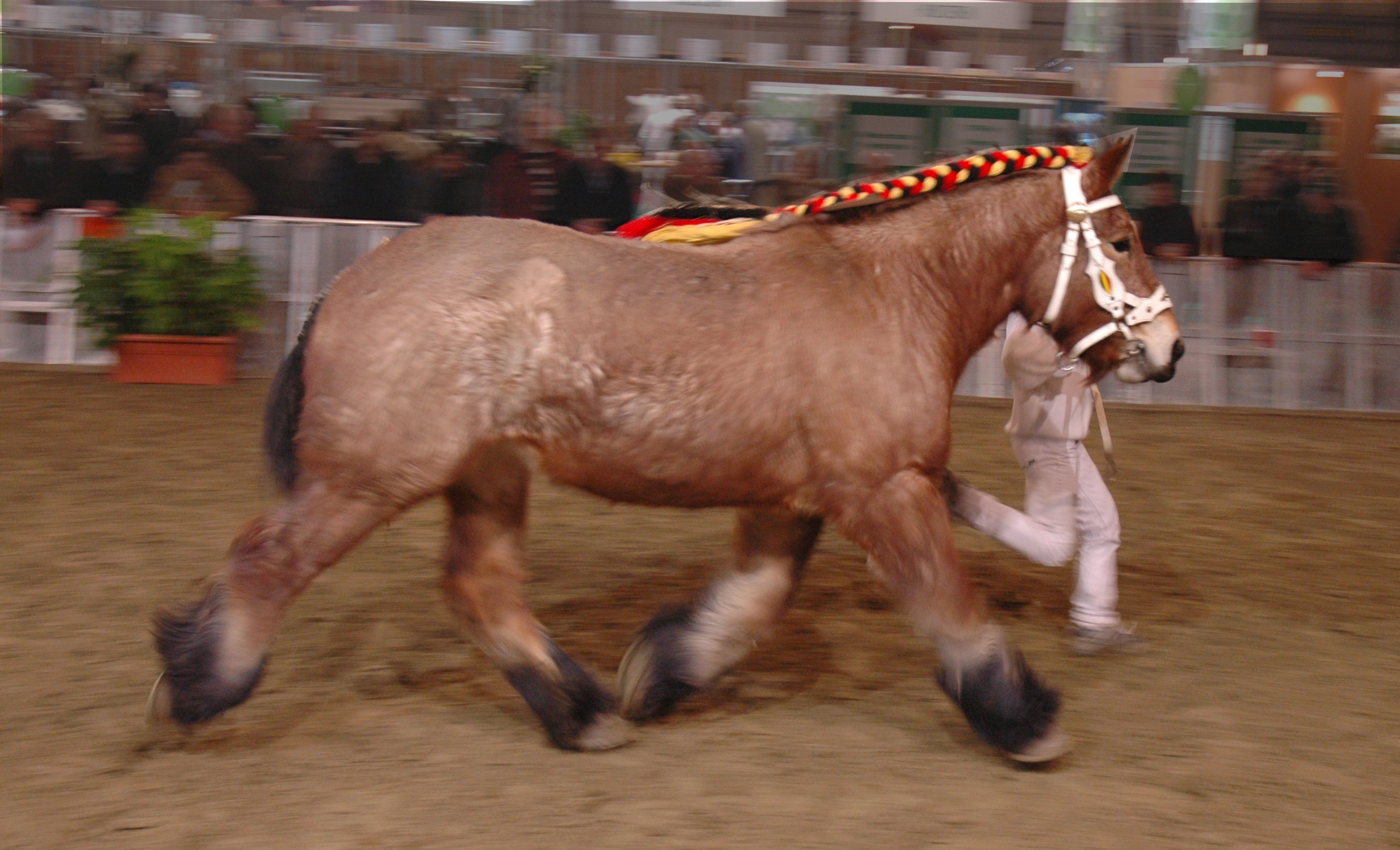
A Belgian horse

The barrel of the 12 cm Lang staal was made by Krupp. It was a built-up gun barrel. It was 2,925 mm long and weighed 1,420 kg.

The caliber was 120 mm at the muzzle. The powder chamber was 29.2 cm long, and had a diameter of 125 mm.

=== Carriage ===
The carriage of the 12 cm Lang staal was made of steel. Gun barrel and carriage had a total weight of 2,790 kg. Others have 2,940 kg, and the carriage itself weighing 1,520 kg. It meant that the gun could not just be placed on any underground.. It generally required the underground to be prepared in advance by placing a wooden floor, which was brought along. In combat this made that the gun could not exercise the artillery roles that required some mobility.

=== Transport ===
For short distances on plane and solid underground, the carriage could be moved, with or without gun. For this a siege limber could be used. The siege limber was a limber without an ammunition box or seats, or basically an axle with wheels and a pole to connect the horses.

For more serious transport, the barrel would be moved so it's trunnions did not rest in their normal high position, but in a lower transport position. Moving the barrel required an iron sheerleg (vestingbok)

On rough terrain, or over larger distances, the siege limber was required. In most cases gun and carriage were then moved separately. Here the character of the 12 cm Lang staal as a siege gun again shows clearly. It was way too slow to follow the army.

As part of the siege artillery, the 12 cm Lang staal batteries would always rely on hired horses. In order to be towed, they required four, preferably heavy, horses. This seems to be in contradiction to the lighter field guns having six horses. The difference was that the 12 cm Lang horses moved only in walk (c. 7 km/h). The field artillery had to move faster, especially the horse artillery, which could move at a canter (16–27 km/h). In the early thirties there were exercises with heavy horses hired from farmers. The Belgian Draught horse promised to be more suitable than the Oldenburgers. However, they proved much slower than military horses, making only 4.5 km/h.

When the gun was re-assigned from the siege artillery to the field artillery, some changes were made. The regular wooden floor was replaced by a simpler 'field' version of 1,280 kg, which could be laid in about 30 minutes, instead of about 5 hours. To allow easier pulling in the field, the wheels of the carriage got 40 cm wide steel tires, and the tail of the carriage got a wide steel plate. The wheels of the limber got 15 cm wide steel tires. This was also when the exercises with hired horses started. For the 12 cm Lang staal it proved that with hired horses, on the paved road, four horses were enough, but in terrain six horses were required.

Later, motorized traction became so powerful that the gun could easily be moved in one piece. However, this did not mean that the gun was assigned motorized traction.

== Capabilities ==
The first serious tests of the gun were done by Krupp in Dülmen in June 1875. With a charge of 3.1 kg of prismatic powder, and a projectile of 14 kg, the average velocity was 469.1 m/s at 50 meters from the muzzle with a pressure of 1,900 atm. With 3.3 kg of another kind of gunpowder it was 466.1 m/s and a pressure of 1,383 atm. The first kind of powder gave the highest velocity.

In the subsequent Dutch trials, which started in April 1876 many kinds of gunpowder were tested. Most of it was coarse gunpowder of about 350 grains per kg. Krupp had determined that the gas pressure inside the gun should not exceed 2,000 atm, and that a suitable gunpowder should propel the projectile to at least 465 m/s at 50 m from the muzzle.

The next round of Dutch tests was done with a new set of two guns, which had grooves inside the chamber, and of which the 12 cm gun fired a heavier 16.7 kg projectile. With a charge of 3.3 kg a velocity of 450.6 m/s was achieved. With 3.5 kg this was 462.6 m/s, but then pressure was 1,950 atm.

The trials were then invalidated by a change that was made to the guns as a result of trials in Germany. The change was that the angle of the grooves was changed from constant to progressive. After some tests, the commission noted very significant differences with regard to atmospheric pressure in July. After many investigations, it was found that in warm weather there was a slight increase in velocity, and a much higher increase in gas pressure inside the guns. The difference could be as much as 7 m/s and 145 atm.

With a charge of 3 kg black gunpowder the initial velocity of the 20.3 kg shrapnel shell was 394 m/s.

In 1928 some changes had been made to simplify the breech, and to prevent the escape of gasses. This increased the rate of fire to 3 shots every 2 minutes. By then range was about 7,500 m. In 1933 the gun was to get new aiming devices. It seems that an attempt to increase the range of the 12 cm Lang staal failed in 1934.

== Ammunition ==
Some shrapnel shot (granaatkartets) delivered by Krupp was tested on Scheveningen beach in 1879. The shell had 185 bullets of 25 gram each, made of an alloy of lead and antimony. The explosive charge at the back of the shell was 125 gram. The complete shell weighed 20.3 kg.

== Operations ==
=== Post World War I ===
In December 1918 the Society Ons Leger (our army) gave a demonstration in The Hague to show the differences between modern and obsolete artillery. The message was that with the old heavy artillery, taking up a position took way too much time. Before the floor for a gun like the 12 cm Lang staal was laid, and the ammunition had been brought forward, an enemy with more accurate modern artillery would have destroyed the obsolete artillery from a distance which was outside of range for the old guns. That is if the old gun would even be ready fire before getting destroyed.

There were many suggestions to make part of the siege artillery more mobile. In the 1920s the 12 cm Lang staal took part in several exercises. The first of these was an exercise in 1926. More exercises followed in 1927.

=== Becomes part of the field artillery ===
In December 1927 the siege artillery regiment ceased to exist as a unit. It was replaced by two regiments of dismounted artillery, one in Gorinchem, and one in Naarden. These would then be made mobile, so they could serve as field artillery. An improvement or repair, which was planned in 1926, was a change to the breech of the 12 cm Lang staal. It was to put an end to disturbances in its operation. There was also a change to the ammunition to increase range. These changes were necessary in every scenario where the gun was to be used.

There were doubts about making the 12 cm Lang staal mobile. This led to measures to get rid of the wooden floor (see above). However, the other main shortcomings of the gun, i.e. the very low rate of fire, and taking aim by moving the tail, could not be remedied economically. Therefore, the firepower of the gun remained very substandard. The cost of making the guns more mobile, was primarily in assigning the soldiers and transport means required to move the guns. As such, these cost could not be justified by the small increase in fire power that it would give. Therefore, there were ideas that only the strictly necessary measures, and the measures for getting rid of the floor would be executed. The gun would then continue to be organized in units which would only be transported after the front had stabilized.

In March 1931 exercises were held near Breda with a battery of 4 12 cm Lang staal which had been reassigned from the siege artillery to the field army. Later in 1931, the regiment of unmounted artillery from Gorinchem held an exercise near Breda. The regiment was embarked in Gorinchem, and disembarked in Oosterhout. In Oosterhout horses from the 3rd Artillery regiment from Breda took the guns in tow.

In 1934 it was thought that the 12 cm Lang staal would finally be retired. The international situation might have prevented this. In March 1936 the 13th and 14th Artillery regiment were armed with the 12 cm Lang staal.

== Sources ==
- Den Beer Poortugael (1879), "Definitieve vastselling van het VIIIst hoofdstuk der Staatsbegrooting voor het dienstjaar 1879", Militaire Spectator, Bijblad, Broese en Comp. Breda: 17–36
- Beijen, H.J.R. (1876), "Staatsbegrooting voor het dienstjaar 1876", Militaire Spectator, Bijblad, Broese en Comp. Breda: 197–224
- Beijen (1877), "Hoofdstuk VIII, Tweede memorie van Beantwoording", Militaire Spectator, Bijblad, Broese en Comp. Breda: 20–31
- Enderlein (1875), "Staatsbegrooting voor het dienstjaar 1876", Militaire Spectator, Bijblad, Broese en Comp. Breda: 164–187
- Enderlein (1876), "Begrooting van uitgaven voor de voltooiing van het vestingstelsel, dienst 1876", Militaire Spectator, Bijblad, Broese en Comp. Breda: 1–21
- Reuther (1880), "Staatsbegrooting voor het dienstjaar 1881", Militaire Spectator, Bijblad, Broese en Comp. Breda: 75–153
- De Roo van Alderwerelt (1877), "Staatsbegrooting voor het dienstjaar 1877, voorlopig verslag n.a.v. tweede onderzoek in de afdeelingen", Militaire Spectator, Bijblad, Broese en Comp. Breda: 1–14
- De Roo van Alderwerelt, J.K.H. (1878), "Staatsbegrooting voor het dienstjaar 1878", Militaire Spectator, Broese en Comp. Breda: 83–102
- Scherer, F.G.A. (1879), "Opmerkingen omtrent de uitrusting aan geschut der liniën en sterkten", Militaire Spectator, Broese en Comp. Breda: 45–52
- Scherer, F.G.A. (1880), "Overzicht van de verschillende hier te lande genomen proeven met grofkorrelig buskruit", Militaire Spectator, Broese en Comp. Breda: 609–631
- Van der Schriek (1881), "Staatsbegrooting voor het dienstjaar 1882, voorlopig verslag der commissie van rapporteurs", Militaire Spectator, Bijblad, Broese en Comp. Breda: 405–424
- Staff Editor (1879), "De formules van Sarrau, ter berekening van de snelheid van beweging van het projectiel in de ziel en van de spanning der buskruitgassen", Militaire Spectator, Broese en Comp. Breda: 24–44
- Staff editors MW (1881), "Artillerie schietproeven van Krupp", Militair Weekblad, Gebroeders Belinfante, 's Gravenhage
- Staff Editors (1936), "Appendix: Samenstelling van het Veldleger", Mavors, Mavors, Arnhem: 189
- Van Alles Wat (1879), "Onderzoek van granaatkartetsen tot stalen kanonnen van 15 en 12 cm", Militaire Spectator, Broese en Comp. Breda: 487–488
- Van Alles Wat (1880), "Beproeving an vervoerstangen tot belegeringaffuiten", Militaire Spectator, Broese en Comp. Breda: 819
- Van Santen, J.J. (1926), "De Modernisering der Nederlandsche Artillerie getoetst aan tactische eisen" (PDF), Militaire Spectator, Broese en Comp. Breda: 646–658
- Weitzel (1884), "Staatsbegrooting voor het dienstjaar 1884", Militaire Spectator, Bijblad, Broese en Comp. Breda: 1–35
- De Wit, C. (1882), "Het nieuwe Nederlandsche Veldgeschut", Militaire Spectator, Broese en Comp. Breda: 81–93
