= 8.4 cm Feldgeschütz Ord 1871 =

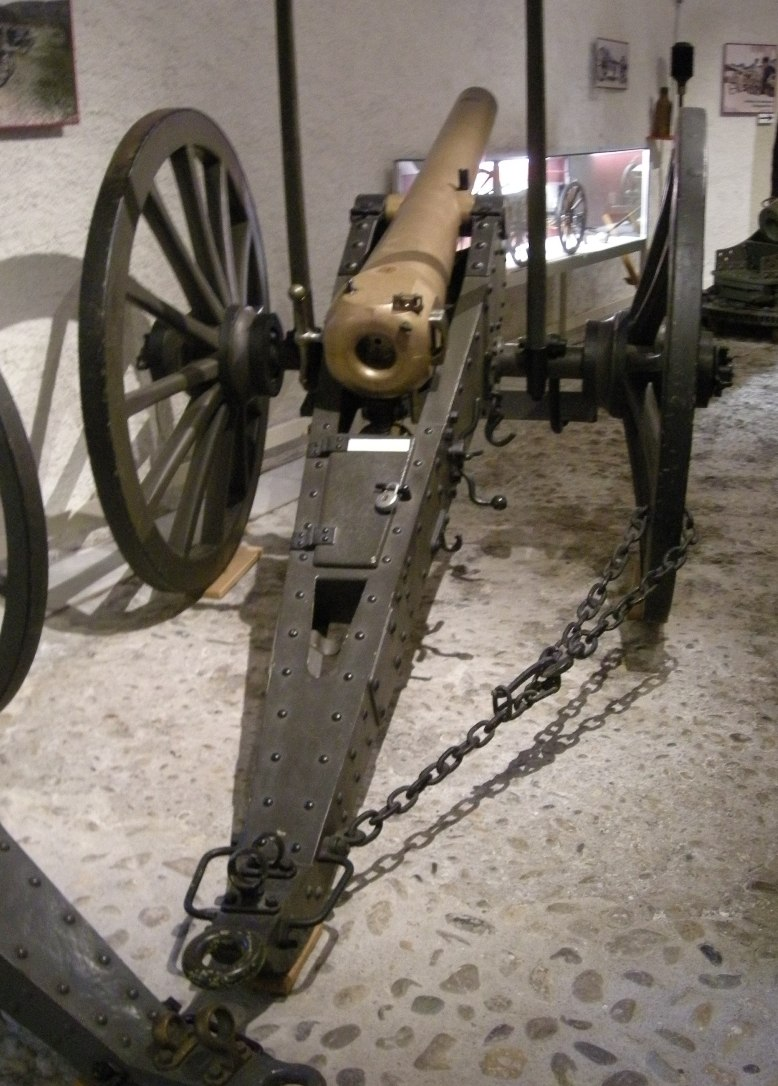
- The 8.4 cm Feldkanone Ord 1871, in Musée militaire vaudois, Morges (Switzerland)
- Type: Field gun
- Place of origin: Switzerland

Service history
- Used by: Swiss Armed Forces; Royal Netherlands Army

Production history
- Manufacturer: Barrel: Rüetschi, Sulzer Carriage: Rieter
- Unit cost: Swiss Army 2,150 Swiss Fr.; Dutch Army: 2,600 guilders
- Produced: 1871
- No. built: Switzerland: 358 bronze; 56 steel bronze; Netherlands: c. 225 bronze; 3 steel bronze

Specifications
- Mass: Barrel: 433 kg.
- Caliber: 8.4-centimetre (3.31 in)
- Muzzle velocity: 396 m/s

The 8.4 cm Feldgeschütz Ord 1871 is a 19th-century Swiss and Dutch field gun. The Dutch version was known as Kanon van 8 cm achterlaad. The Swiss version was replaced by the 8.4 cm Feldgeschütz Ord 1879. The Dutch version was replaced by the 8 cm staal.

== Context ==
=== Switzerland adopts rifled breech loading guns ===
Switzerland had adopted rifled cannon after its artillery committee proposed to acquire 12 batteries of 4-pounder rifled muzzle loaders (8.45 cm RML) in 1861. The committee then proceeded with attempts to transform higher caliber smooth bore muzzle loaders into rifled muzzle loaders, but these attempts were not successful. In July 1866 the Federal Council then approved the transformation of existing 12-pounder SBML's into 12 cm rifled breechloader guns, and to buy 11 batteries of 8-pounder / 10.5 cm cast steel RBL's. The committee next continued trials with the Broadwell breech system. It next started to transform the bronze 8-pounders and short 24-pounder grenade guns of the siege artillery into 10.5 cm RBL's.

During the Franco-Prussian War the French artillery field artillery with its rifled muzzle loaders fared badly against the Prussian rifled breechloaders. Therefore, the Swiss field artillery, which had the excellent 10.5 cm cast steel RBL, then wanted to replace its rather recent 4-pounder rifled muzzle loaders. This also had to do with a desire to make the exercises simpler by only using breech loading guns.

== Development ==
=== Prototypes and trials ===
The Swiss artillery office came up with a gun which would try to maintain the mobility of the 4-pounder RBL. It would weigh 1,450-1,500 kg, and fire a projectile of the same weight (c. 4 kg) with a slightly higher charge. It led to a 1,910 mm long barrel of 80 mm caliber with 12 grooves. Weight of the barrel was 448 kg. The charge was 750 gr, and led to an initial velocity of 430 m/s.

The project proposed by Colonel Bleuler assumed that the Swiss army was less mobile due to the terrain, and that it therefore made sense to instead opt for a gun with better fire-power. Bleuler thought to find this supremacy in firing a heavier projectile. It led to a 2,100 mm long gun barrel of 84 mm caliber with 12 grooves. Weight of the barrel was 433 kg. The charge was 840 gr, and led to an initial velocity of 396 m/s. The weight of the projectile was 5.6 kg.

In the winter and spring of 1870/1871, the two prototypes were tested against each other and against the existing Swiss 8,45 cm (4-pounder RML) and 10 cm guns. The superiority of the 8,4 cm prototype was clear at distances over 2,000 m. The 84 mm had an advantage over the 80 mm that could not be derived directly from the caliber. It fired its heavier projectile at a lower speed (396 m/s vs. 430 m/s), but this heavier projectile was better able to keep its velocity. Already at 1,000 m from the muzzle the 84 mm projectile was flying faster than the 80 mm projectile. In the end the committee opted for the 84 mm gun, primarily because it was more accurate and destructive on the longer ranges, where its projectiles hit at a smaller angle.

The 8.4 cm Feldkanone Ord 1871 was exhibited on the 1873 World Exposition in Vienna. The description was of a 8.4 cm bronze breechloader. It had been cast by the foundry of Emil Rüetschi in Aarau. It had been bored and finished by the Sulzer Brothers in Winterthur. The iron carriage had been made by Rieter from Winterthur.

=== Production ===
Production was done by recasting the 4-pounder rifled muzzle loaders (8,45 cm RML). Of these, there were 356 present, but a lot of new metal still had to be added. Only two 8.4 cm Feldgeschütz Ord 1871's would be completely new at 2,150 CHF a piece. In total 358 pieces were ordered in 1871.

=== The Dutch 8 cm A. Bronze ===
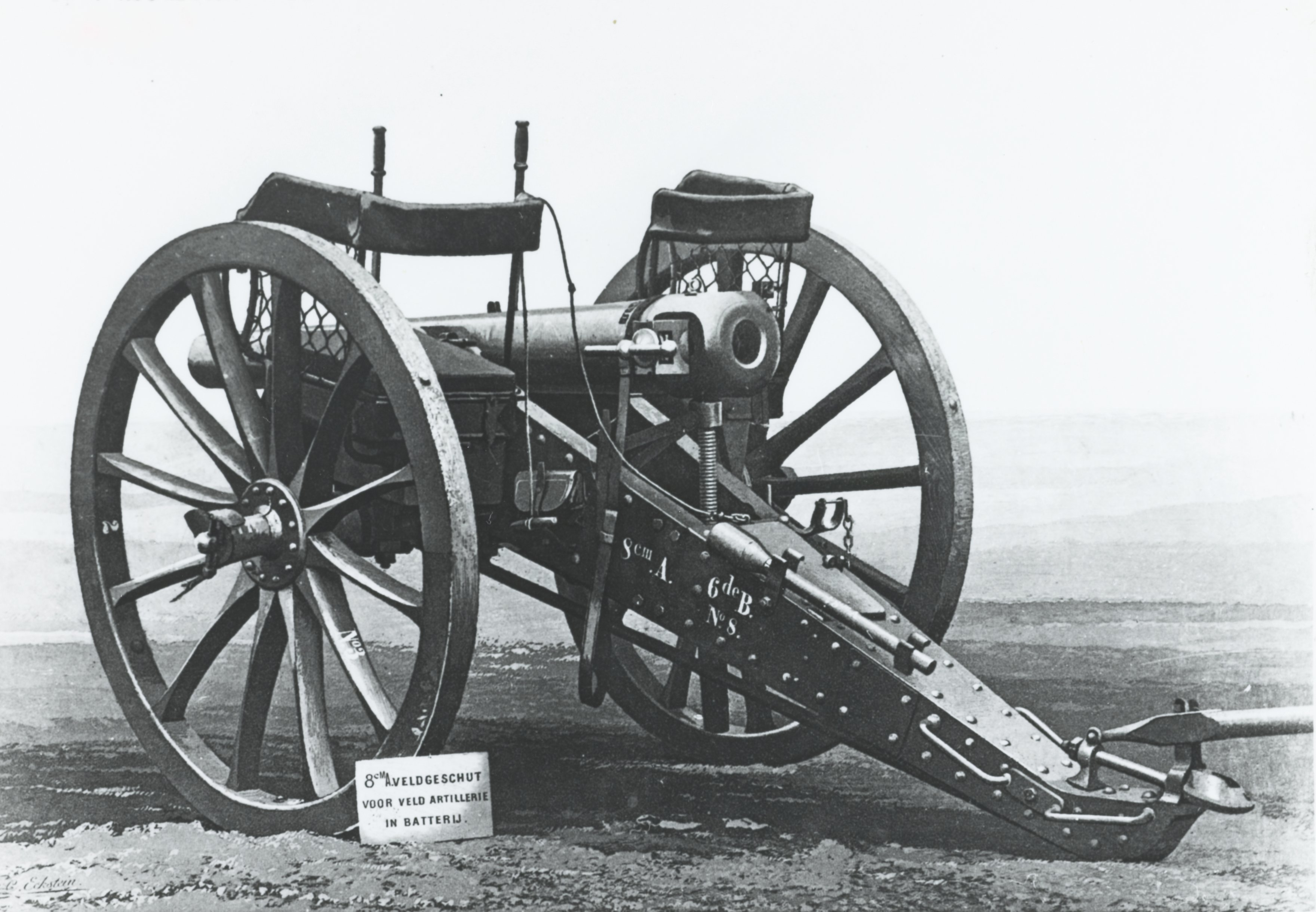
Dutch 8 cm A. Br.

By early 1870 the Dutch field artillery was very backward. In March 1871 the Dutch therefore sent two artillery officers to Switzerland to study the 8.4 cm Feldkanone Ord 1871. They bought the gun and 500 shot in Winterthur. In early 1872 the gun arrived in the Netherlands and was successfully tested against the Dutch 8 cm rifled muzzle loader (RML). However, procurement by the Dutch was delayed by the Aceh War and other priorities.

The Dutch version was at first known as Kanon van 8 cm achterlaad, or 8 cm A. 'Achterlaad' meant that it was breechloading. This label had to be added to distinguish it from the 8 cm RML. Later a similar gun with a Krupp barrel was introduced, and this got named Kanon van 8 cm A. staal, for 'steel'. Within a few years, this became confusing, and so the label 'bronze' or 'br' was added. Leading to: Kanon van 8 cm A. brons, or still later 8 cm brons.

In 1873 the Dutch finally decided that 140 guns were needed, and 20 would be produced by the Rijks Geschutgieterij (national gun foundry) in The Hague in 1874. The local cost would be 48,000 guilders for 20 guns. However, in 1874 the then minister of defense decided to expedite matters, and so all 140 guns had been cast by 1 January 1875 for 336,000 guilders. For 1875 the minister then only demanded funding for finishing 100 guns. This would cost only 200 guilders a piece. For 1878 the plan was to produce 58 guns, these would become 320 guilders a piece cheaper by using recycled bronze.

In 1880 the plan was to reorganize the Dutch field artillery in three regiments with 36 guns each, and one more mobile unit called Rijdende Artillerie with 12 guns. Therefore, 136 8.4 cm guns would be required for the field artillery. The fortifications would require 225 8.4 cm guns. The total number of 8.4 cm guns required was 361. On 1 January 1880 212 8.4 cm guns bronze were available, so 149 were still to be procured. The cost of 149 bronze 8.4 cm guns was budgeted for 773,310 guilders, or 5,190 guilders per gun. However, if the extraordinary demand of 700,000 for new field guns (i.e. the Krupp 8,4 cm) for the field artillery on the 1881 budget would be allowed, 136 of these bronze guns would not be made. It would decrease the 773,310 with 542,640 guilders, because some parts would still have to be made.

=== Gradual replacement ===
On 24 April 1878 the Swiss Federal Council decided to modernize the field artillery by adopting a built up steel Krupp barrel. It was mounted on the carriages of the 8.4 cm Feldkanone Ord 1871 without any modification. In 1879 the first 15 8.4 cm Feldkanone Ord 1879's were delivered. The old bronze barrels Ord 1871 were then handed over to the Festungsartillerie, or recast.

=== The 8.4 cm Positionskanone 1887 L 25 ===
When Franz von Uchatius invented steel bronze, many countries reverted to using bronze for guns. Bronze was easier to manufacture, meaning that these countries were no longer dependent on foreign countries for manufacturing guns. Bronze was cheaper in the sense that a new bronze gun from recycled bronze was significantly cheaper, an advantage that was not applicable recycling iron guns. In 1882 two steel bronze barrels were ordered at Sulzer. Tests of these barrels were positive, and in January 1887 it was decided to procure 56 of these for the newly organized leichte Positionsartillerie (light siege batteries). The steel bronze version was placed on a fortification carriage that also fit the other 8.4 cm guns. The breech of this 8.4 cm Positionskanone 1887 L 25 equaled that of the 8.4 cm Feldkanone Ord 1871. Due to a somewhat higher elevation it had somewhat more range. In order to absorb recoil it rolled back and upward on rails, and was returned to its position by gravity.

=== The Dutch Steel bronze 8 cm A. ===
The Dutch government harbored the same doubts as the Swiss about bronze guns. By 1879 the Dutch government had decided that the 8 cm bronze BL would be replaced by either a steel or a steel bronze guns. Meanwhile, three steel bronze guns were constructed in the second half of 1879. On the budget for 1880 an extraordinary demand was made of 700,000 guilders for 60 steel bronze guns. In 1880 the Dutch trial with steel bronze guns for the army failed unexpectedly. In 1880 the defense minister then decided to buy a 84 mm gun from Krupp, later known as 8 cm staal.

== Characteristics ==
=== Barrel ===
The original 8.4 cm Feldgeschütz Ord 1871 had a 2,100 mm long barrel of 84 mm caliber with 12 grooves. Weight of the barrel was 433 kg. recoil was about 5 metres. The breech was closed with a Broadwell Ring. This ring was pressed forward on closure, and then pressed back by the explosion, preventing the escape of poisonous gasses.

The Dutch also reported the barrel to be 2,100 mm long, and put the weight at 434 kg. The 12 grooves were reported to have an angle of 4.34 degrees. They were 1.5 mm deep, and were wide 18 mm at the rear, and 14 mm at the muzzle. The Dutch reported that they had shortened the barrel by 10 cm, just like had been in Switzerland, and that this had only a very minor effect on velocity.

The gun was fired by a Reibschlagröhre, which was inserted above the breech.

=== Carriage ===
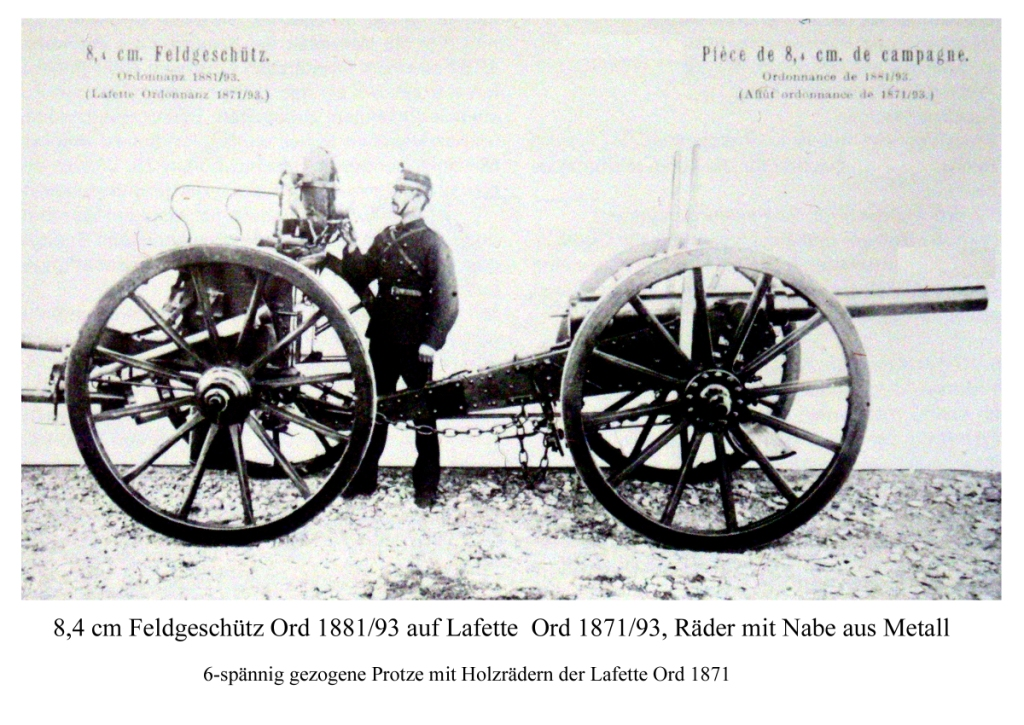
8.4 cm limber and cart (with 8.4 cm Feldgeschütz Ord 1879)

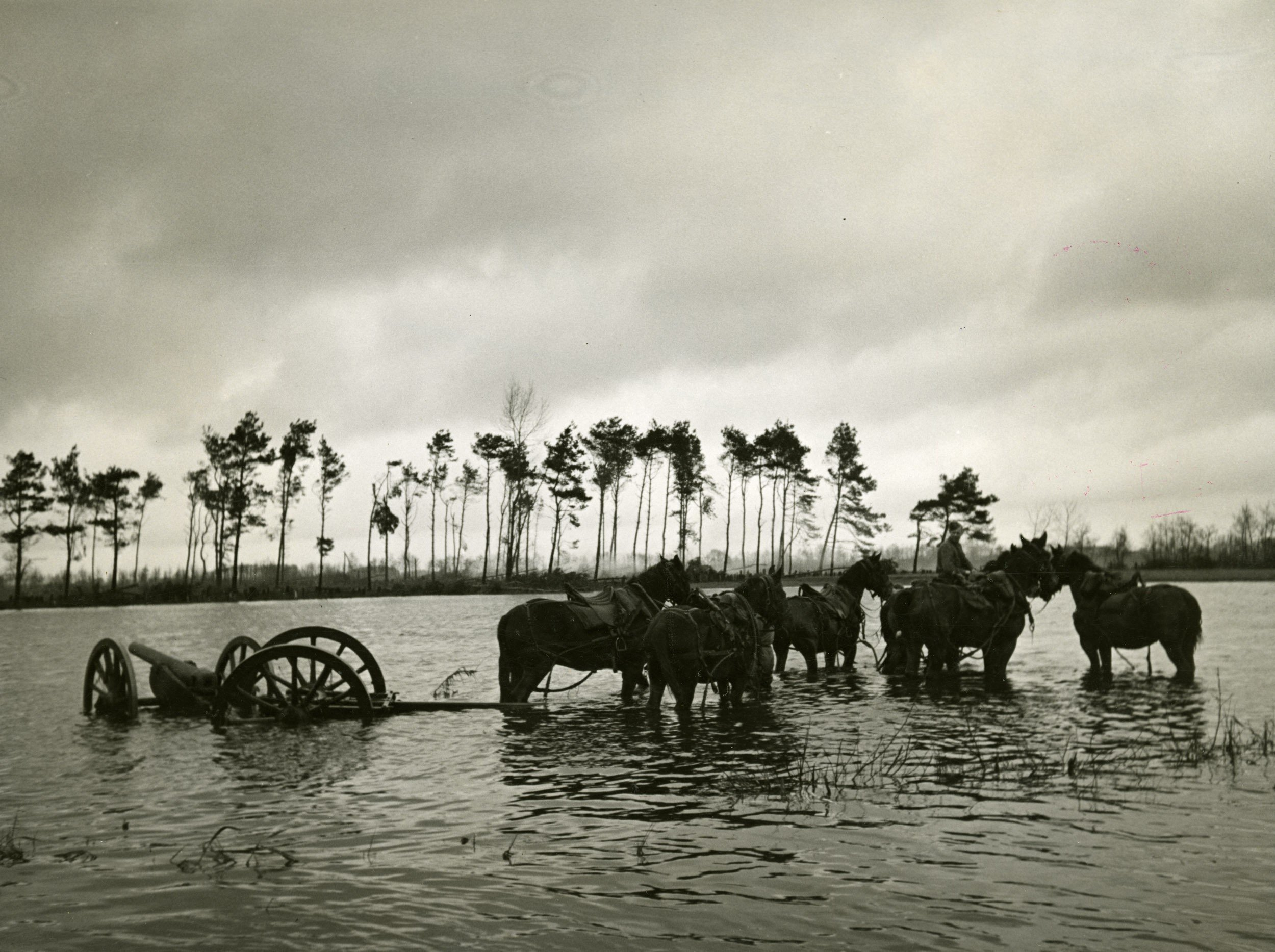
Dutch mobility trial in September 1939.

The Swiss gun was mounted on the iron carriage of the 4-pounder breechloader, which was changed to fit the new gun. Later the 8.4 cm Feldgeschütz Ord 1879 would be mounted on the same carriage. Nevertheless, the carriage only applied to the 145 guns serving in the field army.

The iron carriage had a steel axle, and wooden wheels with iron tires. There were two brackets of sheet iron which converged to the point where the gun was towed. The gun was fixed with its trunnions fitting into two semi-circular openings in the brackets. These were then locked shut with a semi-circular iron clasp. Between the brackets there was a small trail-box. The elevation screw came up from the carriage to a point below the breech of the gun. The screw was operated by a hand-wheel situated on the outer face of the right bracket. The gun carriage did not allow for sideways movement of the barrel. Taking aim was done by shifting the rear of the carriage. To gain leverage, one of the poles sticking upwards on the side of the barrel (see e.g. the photo of the gun in the Waadtländisches Militärmuseum Morges) was placed in an opening at the end of the carriage.

During transport two gunners stood on foot boards that were fixed to the gun carriage, and held on to these poles. One of the gunners handled the brake. The total length of the gun and carriage was 3,5 m, width (on the axels) 1,7 m, track 1,4 m. The diameter of the wheels was 1,44 m. The barrel was 1,13 m above the ground.

The other 293 Swiss 8.4 cm Feldgeschütz Ord 1871 were to be mounted on wooden carriages. These were adapted from the wooden 4-pounder breechloader carriage. In service with the siege artillery, the gun was mounted on multiple siege carriages.

The Dutch gun was mounted on a repurposed RML 8 cm carriage. The elevation screw was moved a bit, and near the axle a small toolbox and a seat for one of the crew was made.

=== Limber ===
During transport the gun was towed by a two-wheeled limber. The Swiss limber was also made of iron. It had a wrought iron axle, and wooden wheels with iron tires. The ammunition box was made of pine covered with tin, and was strengthened at the corners. It was divided into three compartments. The two outer ones for projectiles, the inner one for cartridges, fuzes, etc. The arm rests were of iron and attached to the lid of the box, which opened towards the horses. The weight of the limber without ammunition was 457 kg, fully equipped this was 783 kg.

The Dutch limber had a box on which three gunners were seated.

=== Transport ===
Limber and carriage were pulled by six horses. Total weight of the Swiss combination was 1,600 kg.

== Capabilities ==
=== Range ===
With a standard charge of 840 gr black gunpowder the initial velocity of a 5.6 kg grenade was 396 m/s. The effective range was about 4000 m, beyond which it was deemed generally insensible to waste ammunition.

In their trials the Dutch used a bag of 0.84 kg powder No. 1, high 180 mm, with an 8 cm diameter.

=== Rate of fire ===
The rate of fire was about 2 shots per minute.

== Ammunition ==
The first grenade for the 8.4 cm Feldgeschütz Ord 1871 was 210 mm long. The purely cylindrical part of it was 125 mm long, and the explosive charge weighed 315 gram. It weighed 5.525 kg. The Dutch gave some further details about this grenade. Primarily that it had four rings. These rings, which fit the grooves, had a diameter of 87 mm, matching the caliber inside the grooves. Between the upper and lower rings, the grenade was wound in rope covered with grease and graphite, in order to prevent deposition of lead inside the barrel. The Dutch noted the effective charge as 0.34 kg gunpowder No. 2. It was ignited by a percussion fuze in the head.

The first shrapnel shot was only 150 mm long. It was a sheet metal tube with a cast iron tip. It contained 130 balls. 105 of these were 122 gram bullets of hardened lead, i.e. an alloy of lead and antimony. 25 other balls were made of zinc, and weighed only 16 grammes each. Total weight of the shrapnel shot was 5.607 kg.

== Gallery ==
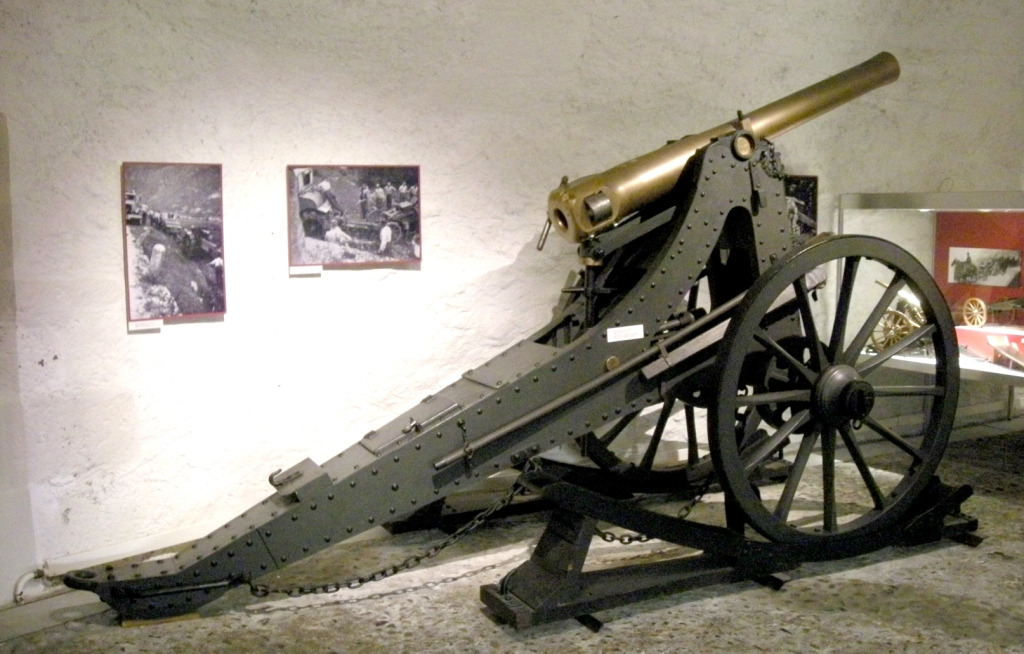
8.4 cm Positionskanone 1887 L 25 with steel bronze barrel in Musée militaire vaudois, Morges (Switzerland)

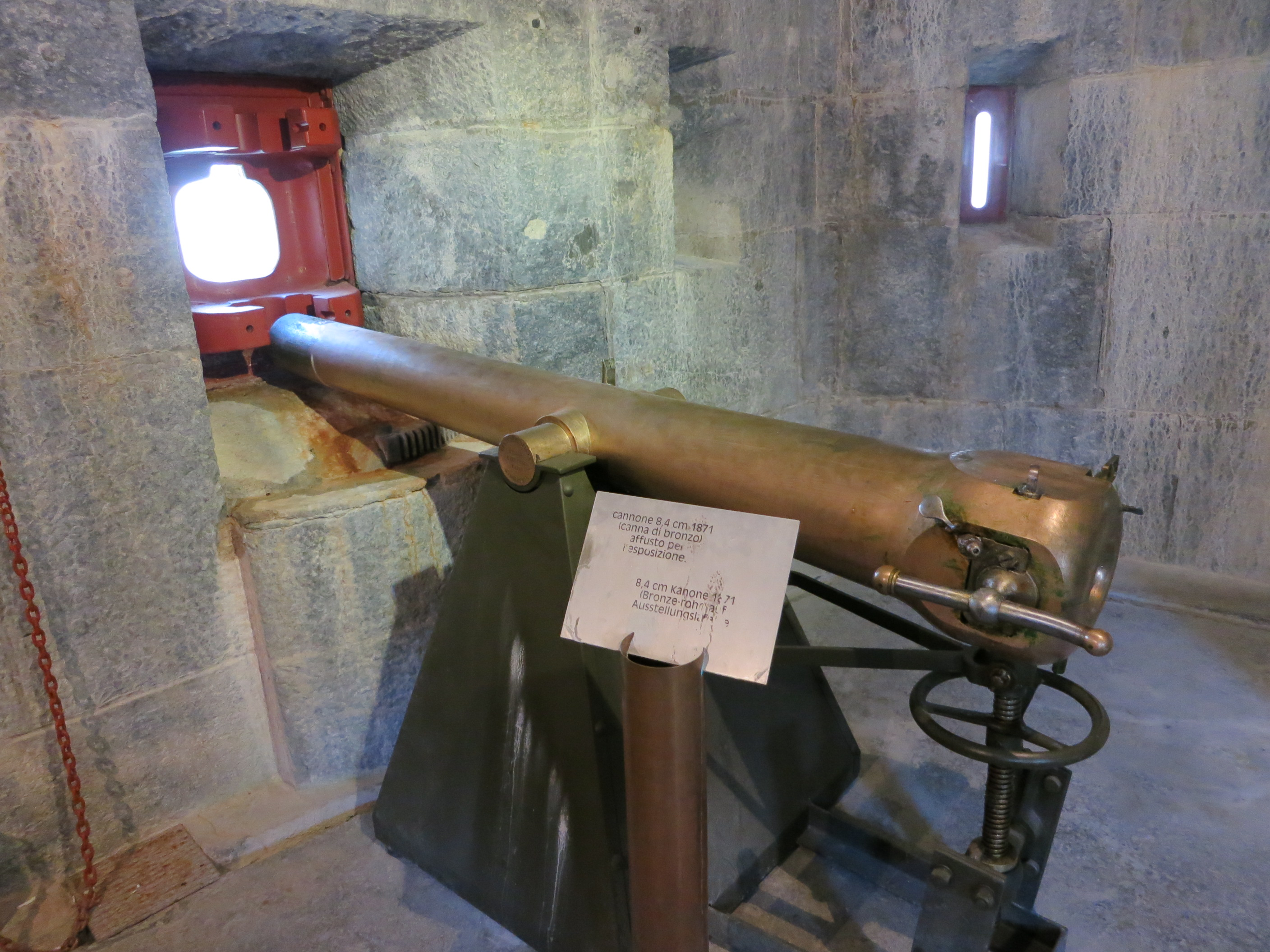
8,4 cm Kanone 1871/88 (8,4 cm Kaponniere-Kanone) in Forte Airolo Museum (Switzerland)

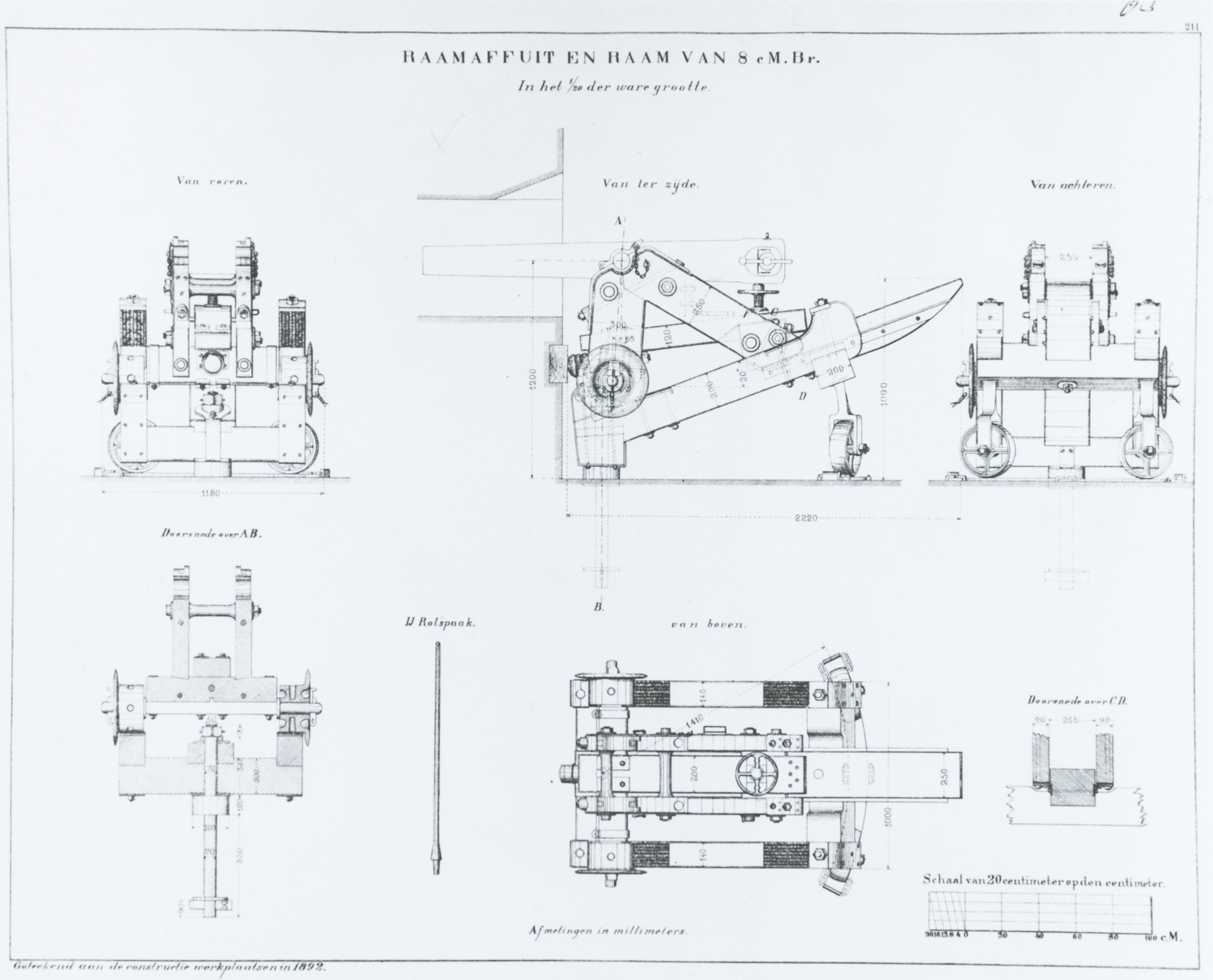
Fortification carriage for Dutch-Swiss gun 8 cm bronze RBL aka 8.4 cm Feldgeschütz Ord 1871.

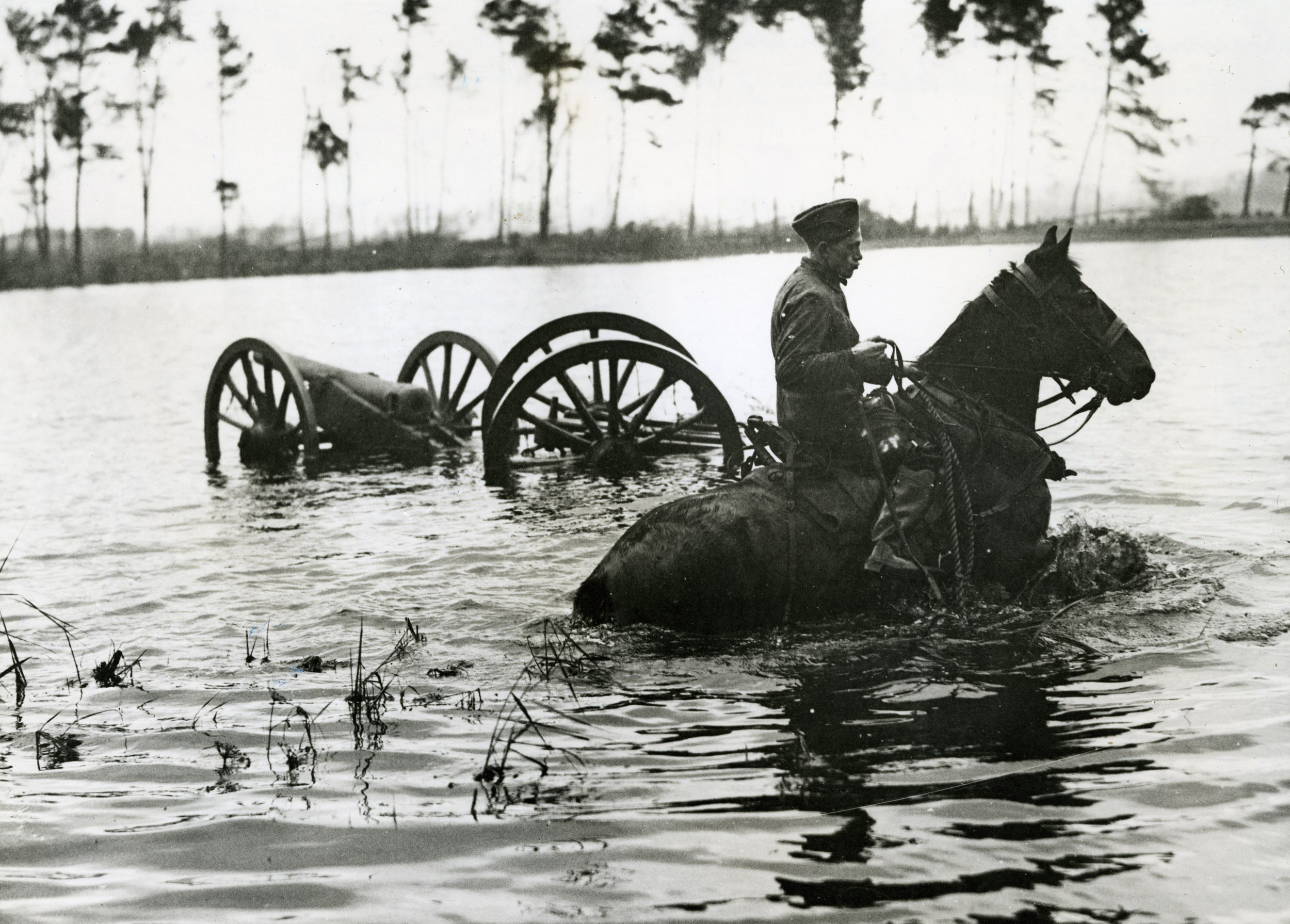
A Dutch 8 cm A. Br. during a trial in the inundated area in September 1939.

== Sources ==
- Bowdler Bell, C.W. (1889), The armed strength of Switzerland, War Office, intelligence division
- Brocx (1873), "Staatsbegrooting voor het dienstjaar 1874 VIIIste hoofdstuk", Militaire Spectator, Bijblad, Broese en Comp. Breda: 161–174
- Luckhardt, Fr. (1874), Die Waffen in der internationalen Welt-Ausstellung zu Wien 1873, Buchhandlung für Militairwissenschaften
- Reuther (1872), "Rapport ... vergelijkend onderzoek omtrent een Zwitsersch achterlaadkanon van 8 cm en een Nederlandsch kanon van 8 cm", Verslagen, Rapporten en Memorien Omtrent Militaire Onderwerpen, V, De gebroeders van Cleef, 's Gravenhage: 123–192
- Reuther (1880), "Staatsbegrooting voor het dienstjaar 1881", Militaire Spectator, Bijblad, Broese en Comp. Breda: 75–153
- Revue Militaire (1879), "Nouveau Matériel de l'Artillerie de Campagne suisse", Revue Militaire Suisse (10), Adrien Borgeaud, Lausanne: 225–227
- De Roo van Alderwerelt, J.K.H. (1878), "Staatsbegrooting voor het dienstjaar 1878", Militaire Spectator, Broese en Comp. Breda: 83
- Schenk (1871), "Transformation de l'artillerie légère se chargeant par la bouche.. (message fédéral)", Revue Militaire Suisse, 16 (17), Imprimerie Pache, Lausanne: 440–448
- Schenk (1871b), "Transformation de l'artillerie légère se chargeant par la bouche.. (message fédéral)", Revue Militaire Suisse, 16 (19), Imprimerie Pache, Lausanne: 481–491
- Van Alles Wat (1880), "Medeelingen betreffende de Nederlandsche Artilerie", Militaire Spectator, Broese en Comp. Breda: 533–541
- Weitzel (1874), "Staatsbegrooting voor het dienstjaar 1875 VIIIste hoofdstuk Memorie van Toelichting c.a.", Militaire Spectator, Bijblad, Broese en Comp. Breda: 17–37
- Wichers, H.O. (1879), "Staatsbegrooting voor het dienstjaar 1879", Militaire Spectator, Broese en Comp. Breda: 1–35
