= 8 cm staal =

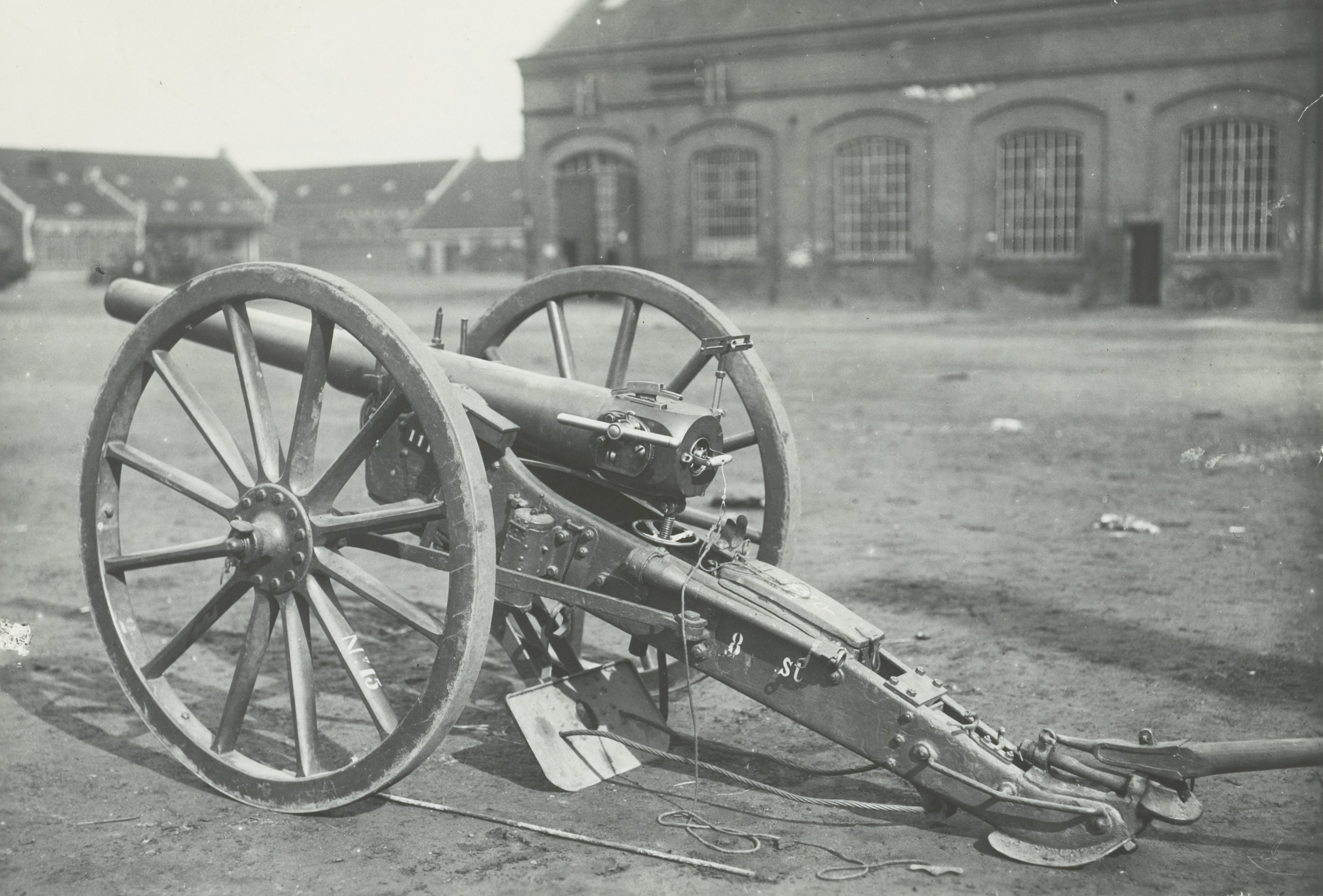
- 8 cm Staal field gun
- Type: Field gun
- Place of origin: Germany, Switzerland

Service history
- In service: 1880-1940
- Used by: Royal Netherlands Army

Production history
- Manufacturer: Krupp

Specifications
- Mass: Barrel 450 kg; Complete 1000 kg
- Length: 2,300 mm
- Caliber: 8.4-centimetre (3.31 in)
- Muzzle velocity: 461 m/s.
- Effective firing range: 1882: 5,000 m; 1929: 5,500 m

The 8 cm staal is a 19th-century Dutch field gun. It replaced the 8 cm A. bronze. The steel barrel and carriage were made by Krupp in Essen, Germany. In turn the 8 cm staal would be replaced by the Krupp 7.5 cm Model 1903. The '8 staal' was hastily brought back into service on the eve of World War II.

== Evolution, History ==
=== The preceding 8 cm A. Bronze ===
After the Franco-Prussian War the Dutch government bought an 8.4 cm Feldkanone Ord 1871 in Switzerland. This was a rifled breechloader field gun with a bronze barrel. The Dutch then started to produce it locally in 1874. In the Netherlands this gun would become known as the 8 cm A. Bronze. The 'A' (Achterlaad) distinguished it from the 8 cm bronze muzzle loaders, "8 cm" was short for 84 mm. Even while the first 8 cm A. Bronze were being produced, there was a strong debate about whether bronze was still suitable for gun barrels.

=== The 8 cm staal ===
In the Summer of 1876 a Dutch artillery committee held comparative trials between their 8 cm A. Bronze and Krupp 87 mm steel breechloaders. The results were clearly in favor of the latter. The committee therefore recommended to procure steel guns, but nothing was done for some years. By 1879 the Dutch government had decided that the 8 cm bronze BL would be replaced by either a steel or a so-called steel bronze gun (see Franz von Uchatius). Meanwhile, three steel bronze guns were constructed in the second half of 1879.

On the budget for 1880 an extraordinary demand was made of 700,000 guilders for 60 steel bronze guns. It was accompanied by a remark that if the trial with the steel bronze gun failed, the minister would quickly buy an equal number of steel guns. In 1880 the Dutch trial with steel bronze guns for the army failed unexpectedly. Later in 1880, the defense minister then decided to buy an 84 mm gun from Krupp. It would become known as the 8 cm staal. This was generally abbreviated to '8 staal'.

=== Gradual replacement ===
The 8 cm staal became obsolete with the introduction of the Canon de 75 modèle 1897 in 1897. This was soon followed by the 7.7 cm FK 96 n.A., and the early M.02/03 version of the Krupp 7.5 cm Model 1903 which the Dutch government bought, and which was later also produced locally.

In 1933 the 16th and 17th artillery regiments, which each still had 6 batteries of 8 cm Staal had these replaced by 2 batteries of Krupp 7.5 cm Model 1903. It meant that the 8 Staal was no longer part of the field army. The 8 cm Staal was then put in storage, but again put into use on the eve of World War II.

== Characteristics ==
=== Barrel ===
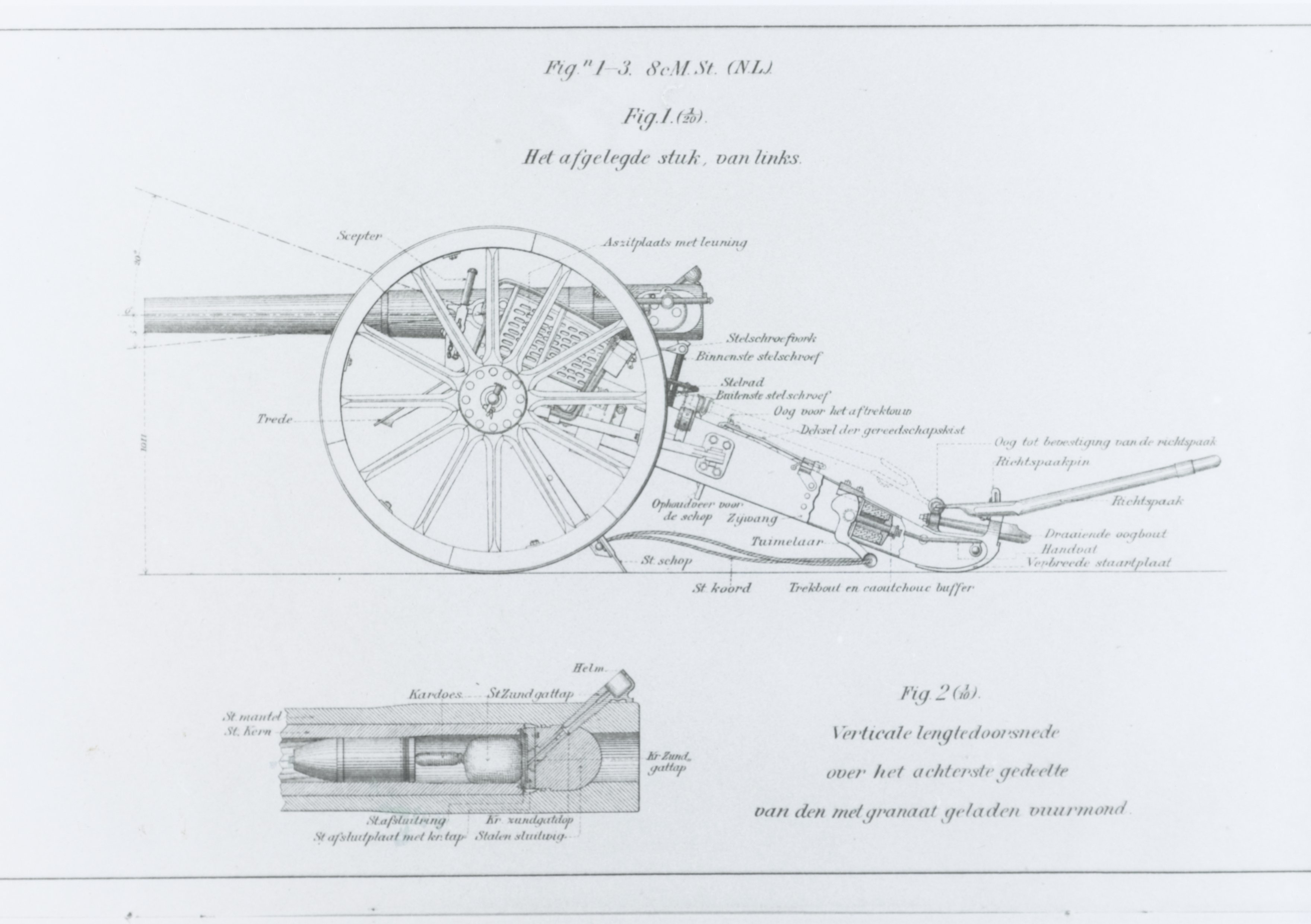
8 cm staal on carriage.

The barrel of the 8 staal was made by Krupp. It was a built-up gun barrel, with one coil pressed over the rear part for more half of the barrel. This makes the front part of the barrel significantly smaller than the wider rear, and enables easy distinction between the 8 cm A. bronze and the 8 staal. The form of the breech part of the barrel is very similar to that of the 8 cm A. bronze, here distinction between the two is clear from the position of the screw and handle which closes the breech. With the 8 staal its vertical position is above the center of the breech.(see picture) The breech itself was a Krupp type comparable to that used on the Dutch 12 cm Lang staal Lang and 15 cm Lang staal. The length of the 8 staal barrel was 2,300 mm. It weighed 450 kg. It had 24 grooves of 1.25 mm deep, progressing from 1.48 to 5.58 degrees at 25 cm before the muzzle, where the rotation became constant.

=== Carriage ===
The carriage of the 8 staal was made of steel. It had a double elevation screw which permitted an elevation of 20 degrees and a declination of 5 degrees. The carriage did not allow for sideways adjustment of the gun. Instead a handspike (see richtspaak on picture) was stuck through a ring at the end of the carriage.

The wooden wheels with iron tires were of the Thonet system. Above the axle were two seats for gunners. The length of the carriage was 2,910 mm. The trunnion (tappenas) was 1,080 mm above the ground. The carriage itself, without equipment, weighed 518 kg. The complete equipped carriage with barrel weighed 1,000 kg. The carriage carried two canister shot.

For ammunition transport, there was a caisson wagon weighing 1,112 kg. The caisson held 46 ring shells and 46 shrapnel shot.

=== Limber ===
During transport the gun was towed by a two-wheeled limber. The ammunition box was made of sheet iron. On top of it was room for part of the gun crew. It had two iron arm rests with a belt for the back in between, and seat cushions. The limber had a steel axle, and Thonet system wheels, the rest of the structure and the disselboom were made of wood. The complete limber without fodder weighed 938 kg. The limber held 17 ring shells, 17 shrapnel shot, and 2 canister shot.

=== Transport ===
Limber and carriage were pulled by six horses.

== Capabilities ==
With a standard charge of 1.6 kg black gunpowder the initial velocity of the 7 kg shell was 461 m/s. The charge was almost double the 840 gram charge of the preceding 8.4 cm A. bronze. The speed difference at the muzzle was 461 m/s instead of 377 m/s. The maximum range of the 8 staal was 5 km for the ring shell, and 3.7 km for the shrapnel shell. The latter was limited by the time fuze. However, in the 1880s one generally did not fire at ranges more than 3,000 m.

In summary, the 8 staal had longer range, was more accurate and stayed accurate. It was also at an advantage as regards fragmentation effect. In general, shells exploded 2 m after hitting the ground, i.e. in the second arc just after a ricochet. As such a smaller angle was preferable. The differences in accuracy and effect between the 8 cm A. bronze and the 8 staal can be compared as follows:

Spread	8 cm A. brons	8 cm staal
Hit angle at 2,000 m	5° 12′	3° 38′
50% height at 2,000 m	3.1 m	1.68 m
50% width at 2,000 m	3.5 m	1.37 m
50% length at 2,000 m	27 m	18 m
50% width at 3,000 m	9 m	2.15 m
50% length at 3,000 m	31 m	23 m

== Ammunition ==
The 8 staal fired a grenade or ring shell (ringgranaat, Ringgranate, obus à anneaux) of cylindro-ogival form. On the outside it had two copper bands. The foremost had a diameter equal to the caliber of the gun, the hindermost to the diameter in the grooving, i.e. 86.5 mm. The cast iron shell was double walled, the inner wall being composed of 12 ten-toothed rings. It was 243 mm long, of this the cylindrical part was 83 mm long. It weighed 7 kg. The explosive charge 270 g gunpowder No. 2. This common shell was detonated with the percussion fuze that was used in the shell of the 8 cm A. bronze. This shell was very similar to the one fired by the Swiss 8.4 cm Feldgeschütz Ord 1879.

The shrapnel shot (granaatkartets) was of the same form. The head was of cast iron, the cylindrical portion and base were made of steel. The head was screwed onto the base and had a channel for the fuze. It held 166 lead tin bullets of 14.1 mm diameter, weighing 16 gram each. This shell was 205 mm long, of this the cylindrical part was 83 mm long. It weighed 7.06 kg. Its explosive charge at the base weighed 70 g. This shrapnel shell was detonated with a time fuze, which could be set from 300 to 3,700 m.

The canister shot (kartets)for close defense was made of sheet metal. It was 237 mm long and weighed 7.00 kg. It held 99 '1/8' bullets of 21.8 mm weighing 48 gram each, and 32 '1/18' bullets of 16.5 mm diameter weighing 21 gram each.

== Operations ==
=== Becomes part of the siege artillery ===
After the introduction of the 7 veld as field gun, the 8 cm staal was transferred to the fortification artillery. In the 1922 organization, the field artillery was made up only of 7 veld guns and howitzers. In 1927 the fortification artillery regiment was disbanded. From its remains two regiments of Onbereden Artillerie (unmounted artillery) were formed. Its staff that handled the 8 cm steel guns and the 6 veld infantry guns was transferred to the field artillery.

Therefore, the post 1927 organization of the field artillery had four regiments of 36 8 cm staal each. These were the 16th and 17th army artillery regiments, and the 22nd and 23rd reserve Artillery regiments. During the 1933 reorganization, these regiments were rearmed with four batteries of 7 veld guns each. The 8 cm staal was then placed in storage.

=== World War II ===
On the eve of World War II, the Dutch government formed some new artillery units armed with about 100 8 cm staal guns. At the time the gun was more than obsolete. It had a very low rate of fire, because it lacked a recoil mechanism. The aiming devices had to be taken off before each shot, and sideways aiming had to be done by moving the tail of the carriage. Furthermore, it could not withstand the high explosive pressures of more modern guns, meaning it had a far shorter range. It also provided a high and visible target that lacked an armored shield to protect its crew. The only positive note was that it had a rather accurate shot till about 3 km distance.

Near Mill in North Brabant German troops crossed the lines in an armored train on 10 May. These then got off the train in Zeeland village, and attacked the lines from the rear. Between Zeeland and Mill, they ran into 9 pieces of 8 cm staal, which had recently arrived. These turned their guns about, and foiled the German attack to the north. Between Gennep and Mook, a single 8 cm staal also resisted vehemently.

== Sources ==
- Anonymous (1881), "Het Nederlandsche stalen veldkanon van 8 cm", Militair Weekblad, no. 52, Gebroeders Belinfante, 's Gravenhage
- Boogaard, F.H. (1882), "Leiding van het granaatvuur, uit het stalen veldgeschut", Militaire Spectator, Broese en Comp. Breda: 378–391
- De Jong, Lou (1969), Het Koninkrijk der Nederlanden in de Tweede Wereldoorlog (PDF), vol. II, Martinus Nijhoff, 's-Gravenhage
- De Jong, Lou (1970), Het Koninkrijk der Nederlanden in de Tweede Wereldoorlog (PDF), vol. III, Martinus Nijhoff, 's-Gravenhage
- Nierstrasz, V.E. (1970), De strijd op Nederlands grondgebied tijdens de Wereldoorlog II Voorgeschiedenis van 1922-1939
- Reuther (1872), "Rapport ... vergelijkend onderzoek omtrent een Zwitsersch achterlaadkanon van 8 cm en een Nederlandsch kanon van 8 cm", Verslagen, Rapporten en Memorien Omtrent Militaire Onderwerpen, V, De gebroeders van Cleef, 's Gravenhage: 123–192
- Reuther (1880), "Staatsbegrooting voor het dienstjaar 1881", Militaire Spectator, Bijblad, Broese en Comp. Breda: 75–153
- Van Alles Wat (1880), "Medeelingen betreffende de Nederlandsche Artilerie", Militaire Spectator, Broese en Comp. Breda: 533–541
- Wichers, H.O. (1879), "Staatsbegrooting voor het dienstjaar 1879", Militaire Spectator, Broese en Comp. Breda: 1–35
- De Wit, C. (1882), "Het nieuwe Nederlandsche Veldgeschut", Militaire Spectator, Broese en Comp. Breda: 81–93
