= Franz von Uchatius =

Austrian artillery general and inventor

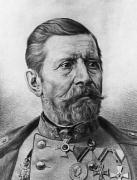
Franz von Uchatius

Franz von Uchatius (1811–1881) was an Austrian artillery general and inventor. His inventions included both military applications and pioneer work in cinematography.

== Invention of a motion picture projector ==
He demonstrated a motion picture projector in 1853, having developed it over the years from 1845. from the device then called stroboscope (Simon von Stampfer) and phenakistiscope (Joseph Plateau). This was the first example of projected animation, demonstrated in 1853; it is also described as the combination of the zoetrope with the magic lantern. It was called the kinetoscope, a term later used by Thomas Edison (see kinetoscope). He applied it to lecture on ballistics.

== Work on a smokeless powder ==
He worked also on a smokeless powder, Uchatius steel was produced industrially, by mixing granulated pig iron with iron oxide.

== Work on unmanned aerial vehicle ==
His balloons, were the earliest recorded use of an unmanned aerial vehicle for warfighting occurred in July 1849, serving as a balloon carrier (the precursor to the aircraft carrier) in the first offensive use of air power in naval aviation. Austrian forces besieging Venice attempted to float some 200 incendiary balloons, each carrying a 24- to 30-pound bomb that was to be dropped from the balloon with a time fuse over the besieged city. The balloons were launched mainly from land; however, some were also launched from the Austrian ship SMS Vulcano. The Austrians used smaller pilot balloons to determine the correct fuse settings. At least one bomb fell in the city; however, due to the wind changing after launch, most of the balloons missed their target, and some drifted back over Austrian lines and the launching ship Vulcano.

== Invention of autofrettage ==
The method of strengthening bronze guns by mandrelling, or cold working them from inside with plugs of hardened steel (now known as autofrettage) was invented and patented in 1869 by Samuel B. Dean of the South Boston Iron Company, but it found no use on the American continent. At the time most European countries were adopting steel guns, and Austrian artillery officers also vouched for adopting foreign Krupp guns in 1872, with a Krupp gun being introduced into Austro-Hungarian trials in March 1873. However Austro-Hungary had no steel industry at the time, so Uchatius copied Dean's technology without a license.

Around 1874, Uchatius and his superiors decided to adopt the inferior mandrelled bronze artillery, which Uchatius marketed as "steel bronze", in order not to depend on foreign steel. They directed large investments into the state arsenal directed by Uchatius to start the production, but the result turned out to be an utter failure: more expensive, heavier and less durable than steel. Despite state propaganda trumping the success of the "indigenous" technology, the empire still had to buy heavy artillery from Krupp, and the humiliated general committed suicide in 1881; however the country stuck to the technology until the WWI, and therefore, Austrian artillery was inferior even as late as that. The characterization that the M1875 field guns were an utter failure: more expensive, heavier and less durable than steel is disputed by Christian Ortner, who states that a comparative analysis done at the time revealed steel-bronze to have similar properties to that of the ringed steel barrels by Krupp and that after a 2,146 round endurance test, the steel-bronze barrels performed equally to the steel barrels supplied by Krupp. It is further stated by Christian Ortner that the continued use of bronze barrels which could be produced at the Artillery arsenal, allowed Austria-Hungary to modernize cheaply, with a steel-bronze barrel costing a third as much as a Krupp steel barrel. This suggests that the M1875 field guns introduced by Austria-Hungary were not inferior to the Krupp guns, nor yet obsolete at the time of their introduction. As a side note, Spain also adopted "steel bronze" for the same reasons alongside the Krupp guns, but withdrew them after the introduction of the smokeless powder.
