= List of World War II weapons of Switzerland =

This is a list of World War II weapons of Switzerland.

== Small arms ==
=== Bolt-action rifles & lever action ===
- Furrer Carbine K31 ~528,230
- Schmidt-Rubin infantry rifle M1911
- SIG Mondragón M1894 Licensed production of the Mexican Mondragón M1893 rifle
- Swiss Mannlicher M1893 carbine ~7,750
- Swiss Vetterli M1881 Stutzer ~11,000+
- Winchester M1866 Swiss copies

=== Semi-automatic rifles ===
- AK44 Swiss copy of the Soviet Tokarev SVT-40 rifle. ~1
- SIG Mondragón M1908 Licensed production of the Mexican Mondragón M1908 semi-automatic rifle

=== Anti-tank rifles ===
- Solothurn S-18/100 ~12+
- Tankbüchse Solo 40/ Solothurn S-18/1000 ~93
- TB 41 W+F Tankbüchse 24mm

M41

=== Semi-automatic pistols ===
- Swiss Luger 06/29 Swiss version of the german Luger P08
- SIG P210 Swiss copy of the French M1935A, few prototypes were made during WW2, serial production started after the war ~11 (44/16)
- W+F Bern Pistol M43 Was supposed to replace the Luger 06/29 but in the end the SIG P210 was chosen

=== Revolvers ===
- Schmidt Revolver Model 1882/29
- Swiss Ordnance revolver M1872/78 ~20,000+

=== Light machine guns ===
- Furrer Lmg 25
- SIG Neuhausen KE7 Mostly for export
- Solothurn S2-200 Swiss Version of the MG30
- Kiraly M1935 Based on the SIG KE7, only prototype for testing purposes

=== Machine guns ===
- MG 11 ~10,000+
- FLab MG 29/38
- Reibel Pz Mg 38 were mounted on tanks

=== Submachine guns ===
- Furrer Lmg-Pist 41/44 ~9,808
- SIG MKPS ~60 Was extremely expensive and complicated to produce, so less was spent on the Swiss Army
- Hispano-Suiza MP 43/44 ~22,600 Swiss version of the Finnish Suomi KP/-31
- SIG Bergmann M1920 Swiss Version of the german Bergmann MP18/I
- Solothurn S1-200 Swiss version of the austrian Steyr MP34
- SIG MP-41 Neuhausen ~200 small amounts for testing purposes only
- Furrer MP19 small amounts for testing purposes only
- Furrer M1921 automatic carbine small amounts for testing purposes only
- Flieger-Doppelpistole 1919 small amounts for testing purposes only
- Furrer Fliegerpistole small amounts for testing purposes only

=== Rifle cartridges (Swiss made) ===
- 7.5x55mm Swiss GP 11
- 10.4x38mm R Swiss Vetterli M69/81 (.41 Swiss)
- 7.5mm M1882 Ordnance
- 20x138mmB Long Solothurn
- 24 X 138 TB41

=== Anti-aircraft guns ===
- 2 cm Flakvierling 38
- 2 cm FLAK 30
- Solothurn ST-5

=== Autocanons ===
- Oerlikon FF
- Oerlikon 20 mm

== Armoured fighting vehicles (AFVs) ==
=== Light tanks ===
- Renault FT ~5
- Vickers Commercial light tank
- LT vz 38 ~24
- Vickers Carden Loyd ~8
- Landsverk L-60 ~1 for assessment
- Renault R35 ~12
- Nahkampfkanone 1 ~1

=== Artillery and anti-tank cannons ===
- Solothurn S-18/1100
- Krupp 7.5 cm Model 1903
- 7.5 cm GebirgsKanone 06 L14 ~54
- 7.5 cm Gebirgskanone L/13 C/80
- Bofors 75 mm Model 1934
- 8.4 cm Feldgeschütz Ord 1871 ~414
- 8.4 cm Feldgeschütz Ord 1879 ~400
- 8 cm staal
- 5.7 cm Fahrpanzer
- 10.5 cm Hb Model 46 Swiss version of the swedish Bofors 10,5 cm Haubits m/40

== Planes ==
=== Fighter planes ===
- Morane-Saulnier M.S.450 ~322 Produced in-house under the designation D-3800 and D.3801/3803.
- Messerschmitt Bf 109 ~129 Operated 10 D-1s, 89 E-3a "Emil" variants, 2 F-4s and 14 G-6s.
- Dewoitine D.27 ~66 Produced directly in Switzerland
- Hanriot HD.1 ~16 Ex surplus planes of the Italians
- Nieuport 28A ~15
- Machhi M.5 ~7
- Comte AC-1 ~1
- Militärapparat MA-7 ~1
- Häfeli DH-4 ~1

=== Bomber planes ===
- Potez 25 Jupiter ~2 Export version, powered by a 313 kW (420 hp) Gnome-Rhône 9Ac Jupiter radial. Built under licence by Ikarbus in Yugoslavia and OSGA in Portugal
- EKW C-3603 ~160
- de Havilland DH.98 Mosquito ~2+1 One was captured by the Swiss
- Fokker C.V ~64 3x D variant and 61x E variant
- Dornier Do 217 N-2 ~1 One was captured by the Swiss

=== Reconnaissance planes ===
- Fokker C.VI ~3
- EKW C-35 ~160
- Häfeli DH-5A ~80
- Häfeli DH-3 ~109
- Häfeli DH-2 ~6
- Häfeli DH-1 ~6

=== Observation planes ===
- Fieseler Fi 156 C-3 Storch ~5
- Potez 25 ~17
- Comte AC-11-V ~1 Mapped areas during WWII

=== Communication planes ===
- Messerschmitt Bf 108B Taifun ~18
- de Havilland DH.89 Dragon Rapide ~3
- Comte AC-12 Moskito ~1

=== Transport planes ===
- Siebel Si 204 ~1
- Junkers Ju 52/3m Tante Ju ~3
- Messerschmitt M18d ~4
- Fokker F.VIIb ~11
- Junkers F.13 ~4
- Comte AC-8 ~1
- Curtiss AT-32C Condor II ~1
- Junkers Ju-86 B-0 ~2
- Douglas DC-2 ~6
- Douglas DC-3 ~16

=== Trainer planes ===
- Pilatus P-2 ~55
- Comte AC-4B Gentleman ~2
- Bückerbü 131B Jungmann ~94
- Bückerbü 133A Jungmeister ~52 Was manufactured by Dornier under license for the Swiss Air Force
- Focke-Wulf Fw 44J Stieglitz ~1
- Nardi FN.315 Alfa Romeo ~2
- Dewoitine D.26 ~11
- Morane-Saulnier MS.229 ~2
- Nieuport 28 C.1 ~5
