= Waffenlauf =

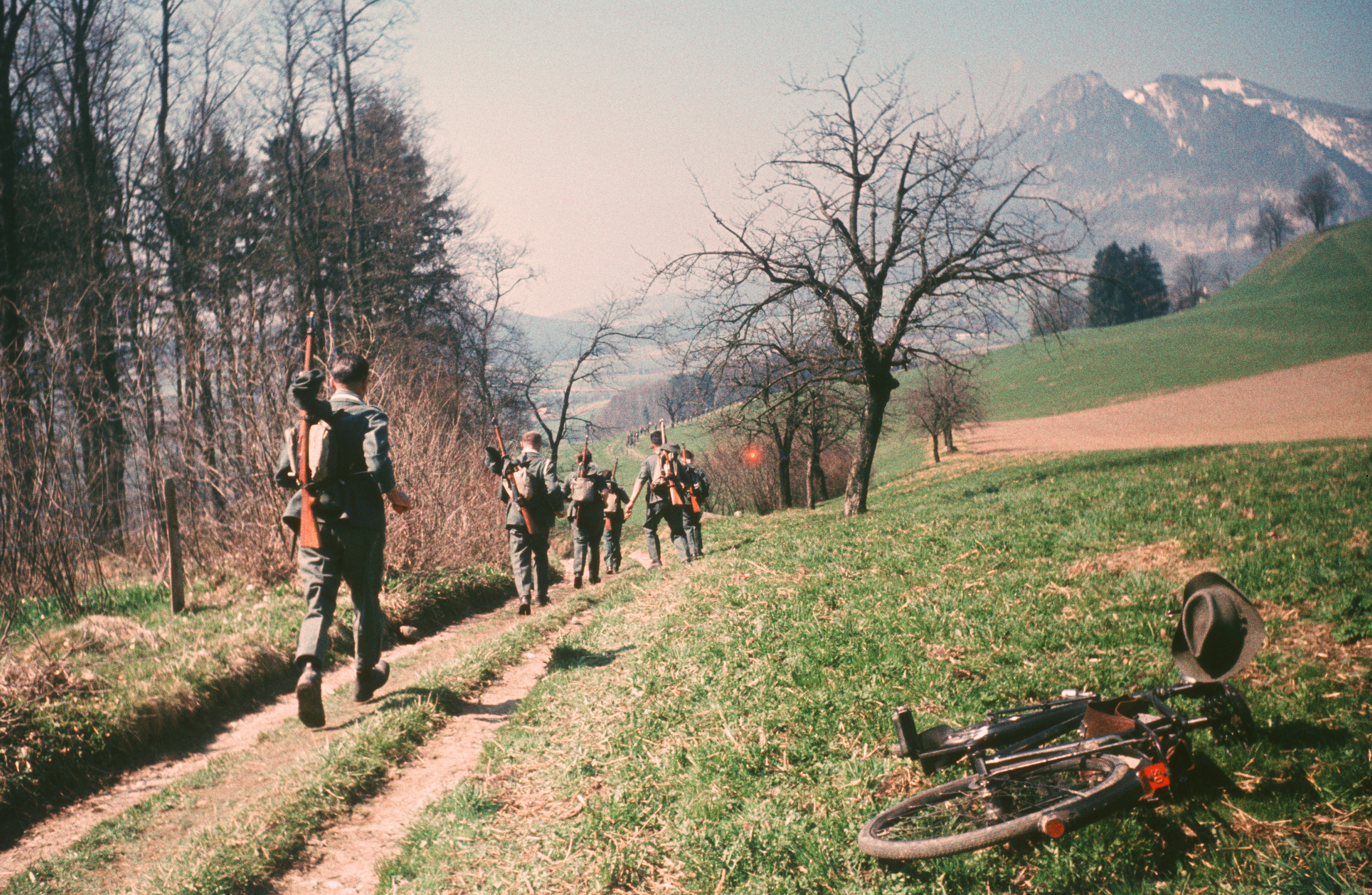
A Waffenlauf in 1958. The servicemen are carrying K31 rifles.

The Waffenlauf (German, literally "weapons run", French course militaire) is a military running long-distance running competition which was very popular in Switzerland from the 1940s until the end of the 1980s.

While the running distances may vary, the race needs to be completed in military combat uniform and a backpack. The backpack has a specified minimum weight. A military-issue rifle is included in the pack's weight.

== History ==
The first Waffenlauf took place in 1916, during the First World War, and it was organized by the soccer club FC Zurich. In 1934, the Waffenlauf of Frauenfeld was created, which is run over the Marathon distance, on a course that features several kilometres of dirt roads as well as 520 m (1706 ft) of ascents. The Frauenfelder is still the most prestigious of the Waffenläufe.

In some cases, the Waffenlauf also included a shooting competition. For example, at the Waffenlauf of Bern (1949–1959, 30 kilometers). the runners could deduct 12 minutes from their running time if they hit the target thrice.

During the 2000s, many Waffenläufe were abolished, while others were newly created. In many cases, the organizers were forced to organize a parallel non-military running competition in order to keep the Waffenlauf feasible due to the dwindling numbers of participants.

As of 2026, 9 Waffenläufe are taking place, with distances of 12.8 to 42.2 km (8 to 26 mi).

== Rules ==
As an example, the rules of the Frauenfeld Waffenlauf (version of 2012):

- Clothing: The participants must wear a Swiss military uniform (blouse and trousers). Members of foreign armed forces have to run in their own uniform. Civilian participants can borrow a uniform. The blouse must be closed during the race. It is allowed to roll back the sleeves. If a cap is worn, it must either be the cap that was issued with the uniform, or a civilian one (colored black to feldgrau, without advertising).
- Backpack: A military-issue backpack must be worn, with a military-issue rifle. The men's backpack weighs at least 6.2 kg (13 1/2 lb), the women's at least 5 kg (11 lb). For women, carrying a rifle is optional. The gun barrel must be visible. Members of foreign armed forces and civilians can borrow a compliant backpack.
- Footgear: All kinds of shoes are allowed. Spikes, cleats, studs and similar aids are forbidden.
