= Lmg 25 =

Furrer M25
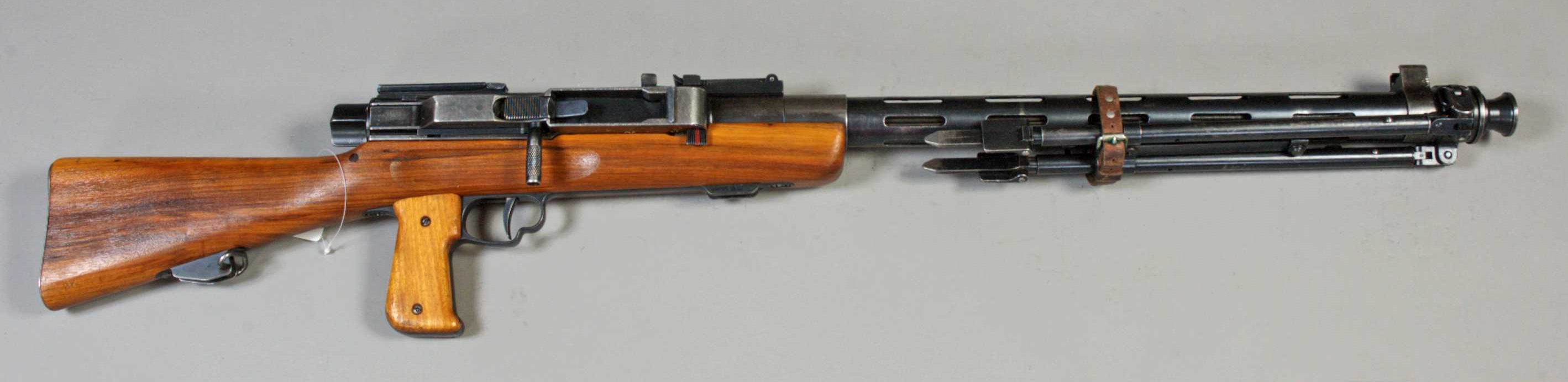
- The Furrer M25 from the Swedish Army Museum
- Type: Light machine gun
- Place of origin: Switzerland

Service history
- Used by: Switzerland

Production history
- Designer: Adolf Furrer
- Manufacturer: W+F Bern
- Produced: 1925–c. 1960s

Specifications
- Mass: 8.65 kg (19.1 lb)
- Length: 1,163 mm (45.8 in)
- Barrel length: 585 mm (23.0 in)
- Cartridge: 7.5×55mm Swiss
- Action: Recoil-operated, toggle-lock
- Rate of fire: Approximately 500 rounds/min
- Muzzle velocity: 731.5–762 m/s (2,400–2,500 ft/s)
- Maximum firing range: 2,000 m (2,200 yd)
- Feed system: 30-round box magazine
- Sights: Front blade; rear tangent leaf, 100–2000 m

The Leichtes Maschinengewehr Modell 1925 (abbreviated Lmg 25) is a Swiss recoil-operated light machine gun designed by Colonel Adolf Furrer at Waffenfabrik Bern in the 1920s. It was produced from 1925 until the 1960s.

The Lmg 25 was the first light machine gun adopted by the Swiss Army for use as a portable infantry weapon. It fires the 7.5 mm Swiss Service cartridge from a 30-round box magazine and has a cyclic rate of fire of approximately 500 rounds per minute. In 1957, it was replaced in Swiss Army service by the Stgw 57.

The Lmg 25 uses a recoil-operated action with a toggle-lock mechanism derived from the system developed by Adolf Furrer. The toggle mechanism is located on the right side of the receiver and operates through a series of linked components during firing and reloading. The weapon was designed for use by infantry and could also be adapted for other roles within the Swiss military. Its relatively compact design allowed it to be operated and transported by a small infantry team.

== Overview ==
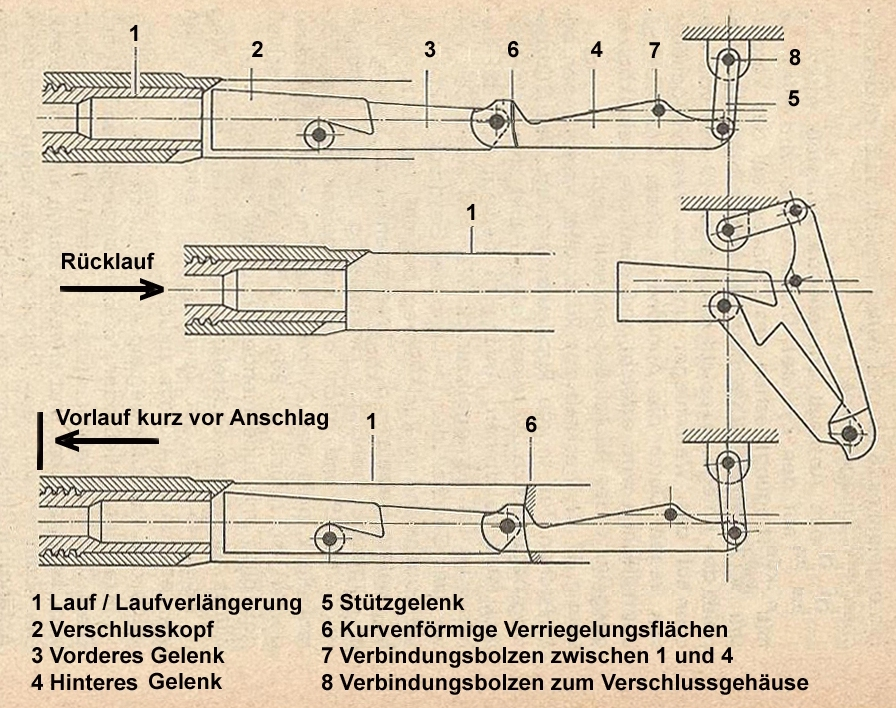
System Furrer toggle-joint function

The Lmg 25 operates toggle-lock firing system, similar to the Luger P08 pistol.

The manufacturing company is the Waffenfabrik Bern, the designer was Colonel Adolf Furrer, the (then) director of the Waffenfabrik Bern. The Lmg 25 was lighter than the water-cooled machine guns of the time, but was also more complicated design, making it difficult to manufacture and raising its price.

In contrast to the Luger P08, the toggle lock of the Lmg 25 is not bent by a control curve, but by a support joint attached to the extension of the rear joint. The Lmg 25 is considered to be accurate but is susceptible to contamination due to large friction surfaces and low manufacturing tolerances as well as the large lateral opening of the breech block, which is necessary for the functioning of the knee joint, the closing flap of which opens automatically with the first shot.

The ammunition is fed in from the right by means of a magazine, the casings are ejected to the left. As a rule, the Lmg fires with pre-ignition, i.e. H. the shot is released when the locked system is still in advance. This prevents it from hitting the housing, which has the effect that the Lmg has a constant kickback, rather a backward thrust, which has a positive effect on the shot precision. Since the recoil of the cartridge and the return of the barrel have to be very precisely coordinated with one another, a changeover switch was installed to ensure that the weapon would function properly when the weapon was tilted sharply downwards.

The Lmg 25 was adopted by the Swiss Army to increase firepower of the light infantry units. In the fusilier squads, it was operated by 2 men and firing was commanded by team leader. The rest of the group was armed with a K31 Rifles and/or a submachine gun. In addition to the bipod (front support), the mount served as a target aid and enabled more precise firing groups at greater distances. The rear support attached to the rear of the butt was adjustable in length and could also be attached to the fore-end as a handle, which made shooting from a standing position easier. With anti-aircraft sights, the Lmg 25 could be mounted on the rear leg of the tripod and used against airplanes. The tripod was only used sporadically after the Second World War.

The Lmg was also used in numerous forts. In order to use the weapon in fortifications, the front bipod was removed and a bracket was attached in its place, which enabled shooting from the openings.

In contrast to Mg 11, Lmg 25 was air-cooled. In the battle, a barrel change was planned after 6 magazines (180 rounds) in order not to overheat the barrel. However, a change was made less frequently when only short bursts (5–8 rounds) were fired and the barrel was allowed to cool. Theoretically, the barrel change took 17 seconds.

== Variants ==
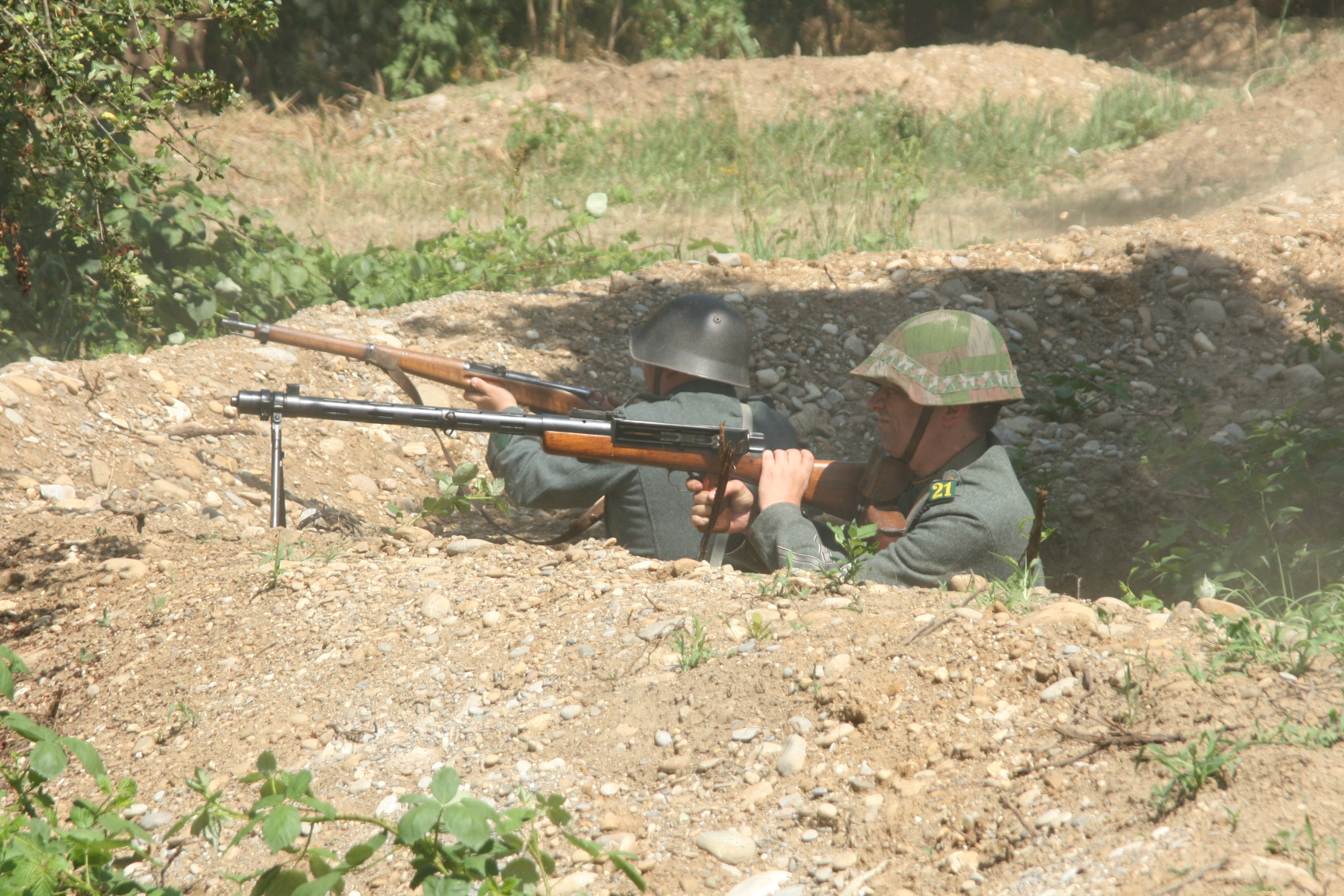
Lmg 25 in position

- Lmg 25 Standardversion (standard version)
- Lmg 25, Spezialausführung für die Kavallerie mit Klappschaft (special version for the cavalry with folding stock): Instead of the fixed piston, this could be folded down for easier transport. The rear leg of the mount for the cavalry was also shorter.
- Lmg 25 mit Zielfernrohrschiene (with telescopic sight rail): A mounting rail for a telescopic sight was retrofitted to some Lmg 25.

== Users ==
- Switzerland: Swiss Army
