= Lmg-Pist 41/44 =

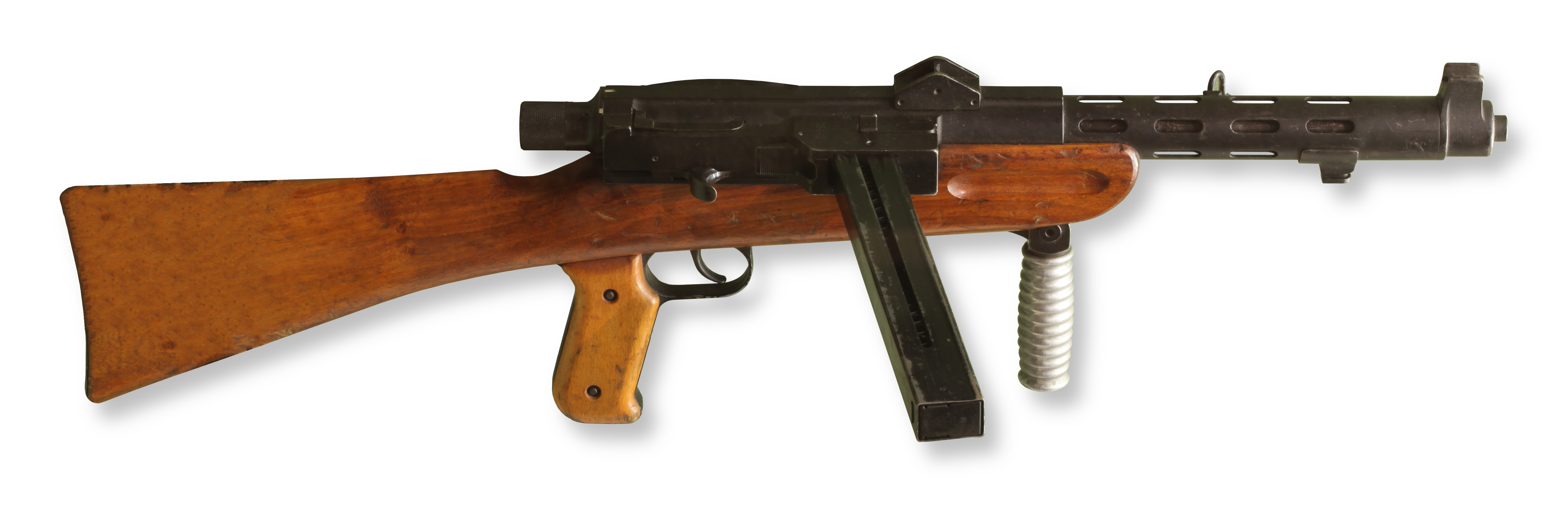
- Lmg-Pist (Leichtes Maschinengewehr Pistole) 41/44
- Type: Submachine gun

Service history
- In service: 1943 - late 1950s
- Used by: Switzerland
- Wars: World War II

Production history
- Designer: Adolf Furrer
- Designed: 1941 (based on design from 1919)
- Manufacturer: W+F Bern
- Produced: 1943-1944
- No. built: 9808 units
- Variants: Lmg.-Pistol Mod. 1941; Lmg.-Pistol Mod. 1941/44

Specifications
- Mass: 5.2kg
- Length: 760mm
- Barrel length: 200mm
- Cartridge: 9×19mm Parabellum
- Caliber: 9mm
- Action: Short Recoil toggle-joint action
- Rate of fire: 900rpm
- Effective firing range: 200m
- Feed system: 40-round detachable box magazines
- Sights: Iron

The Lmg.-Pistole Mod. 1941/44 – also known as Furrer MP 41/44, MP41/44 and LMG-Pistole – was the first submachine gun manufactured in Switzerland for the Swiss Army. The weapon used a complicated toggle-operated short recoil mechanism for its operation and it corresponds to that of the Furrer M25, which is why it is also called Lmg.-Pistole.

The Lmg-Pist 41/44 was manufactured with close tolerances to its components and was difficult to clean and maintain in field conditions. Several thousand examples of this expensive and sophisticated weapon served with the Swiss military forces alongside a larger number of Suomi KP/-31 MP43/44 license production SMGs.

Due to its overtly complex design and high price, Lmg-Pist 41/44 is regarded as one of the worst service firearms of not only World War II, but in history.

== Background ==
The Furrer MP41 finds its origin in an earlier submachine gun design by Adolf Furrer, the MP19. It was chambered in 7.65 Parabellum and was developed in the Federal Arms Factory (W + F) as early as 1914–18 during active service. It utilized Luger's toggle lock system and was equipped with a 50-round curved magazine which was inserted from the right with the bolt opened on the left side. Sometime in 1919–1921, a Model No 92 was made. A variant based on the model of the Italian Villar-Perosa M1915 double submachine gun was made for aircraft armament. According to the report of the General Staff in 1945, the No 92 was antiquated and unsuitable as a weapon of war.

At the onset of World War II, Switzerland had declared neutrality in the fast escalating conflict. The prospect of potential invasion by Nazi Germany was a real possibility and in preparation for such scenario, the Kriegstechnische Abteilung, sent out an ordnance survey to Swiss Army in May 1940. Upon reviewing the results, the outfit found that the Swiss Army had less than 500 submachine guns at their disposal and the matter needed to be rectified urgently.

The Swiss army commissioned SIG and W+F Bern, then two of the largest domestic small arms producers in Switzerland, to create new sub-machine gun prototypes for the Army. The director of W+F Bern, Adolf Furrer would be the chief designer of Lmg-Pist 41. His competition by SIG was the SIG MP41.

To win the weapon trials, Adolf Furrer, who was politically connected to Swiss Army at the time, aggressively lobbied for his design to be chosen. Ultimately, the sub-machine gun trials were never held and the Swiss Army went on to adopt the Furrer MP41/44.

== Design ==
The MP41/44 employs similar function to Furrer's prior Lmg 25. Furrer's toggle lock double link lever is connected to both the barrel assembly, the bolt and the receiver. Movement is somewhat controlled. There are some similarities to other more simple toggle locked weapons like the Luger, the Pedersen, the Schwarzlose and the Maxim.

The positions of the safety lever on the front of the magazine shaft are F – single fire, M – series fire and S – safety. In position S the lock is blocked and in the closed and open position. The ammunition is supplied from the right from a double-row magazine with 40 rounds. The cases are ejected to the left. The folding visor is adjustable to 100/200 m. The barrel jacket with bayonet holder is perforated.

The weapon was manufactured by Waffenfabrik Bern. The MP 41 was expensive to manufacture because of the complicated lock construction. Owing to manufacturing problems, the first 100 test models could not be delivered until April 1942.

Troop trials showed other problems that could be corrected in series production. The weapon was considered accurate, somewhat heavy and, due to the small manufacturing tolerances, susceptible to contamination. Problems that occurred in the deployment of troops led to further modifications to existing and newly manufactured weapons, which is why the weapon originally called MP 41 was renamed MP 41/44.

== Adoption and problems ==
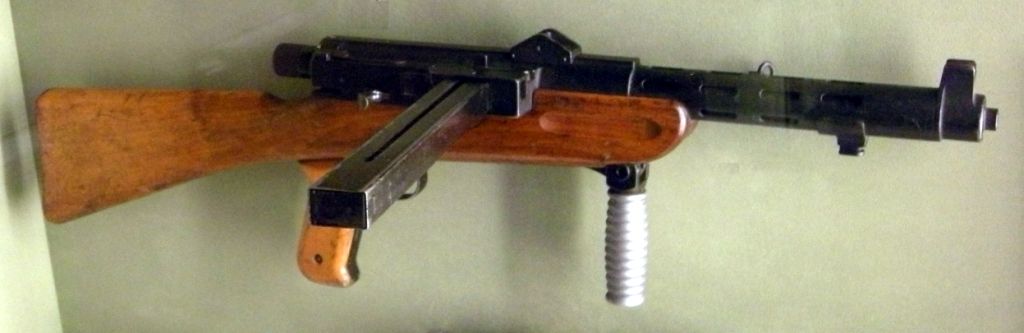
Furrer MP41/44 from another angle

The MP 41 was intended to increase the firepower of infantry units. In the fusilier group, it should be used for assault and close combat. From January 1943, 60 to 70 instead of the planned 600 units were produced and supplied to the troops once per month. The number of weapons delivered was insufficient, and they were expensive, complicated to disassemble and prone to contamination.

In order to meet the demand for submachine guns in World War II, the Federal Military Department, therefore, approved the application of the War Technology Department in November 1942 to acquire 5000 Suomi submachine guns from Finland; 100 of this war-tested weapon were delivered as early as December 1942. In February 1943, a license agreement was also signed with the Finnish arms factory. The Hispano-Suiza company in Geneva was commissioned with the production.

An obvious further use of the MP 41/44 was then in fortresses and with secondary troops, where pollution and maintenance were a minor problem.

Total production by the end of 1944 was 9808 units. The weapon was in use until the end of the 1950s. An unknown number of the MPs produced were melted down in late 1960, which is why they are sought-after collector's items these days.

=== Legacy ===
The Furrer MP41/44 was plagued with production issues that caused significant trouble for the Swiss Army. This debacle would damage Adolf Furrer's reputation, namely because of Furrer's dogged insistence on the adoption of his own weapon design over the SIG.

== Variants ==
The Lmg.-Pistol Mod. 1941 was originally manufactured with a Bakelite shaft.

The Lmg.-Pistol Mod. 1941/44 shows the following modifications:

- Lateral knee joint protective cover can no longer be removed. Welded with 3 points
- Cams to secure the loading lever, the loading lever also had to be adapted.
- Reinforcement of the extractor axis.
- Cord wrapping removed from foregrip.
- Bakelite shaft replaced by wooden shaft.

== Users ==
- Switzerland: acquired by Swiss Army in 1943 during World War II. The weapon was in service until the end of the 1950s.

== See also ==
- SIG MP-41

== Notes ==
1.War Technical Department, the Swiss federal agency for military procurement; now known as Armasuisse.
