= SIG MP41 =

SIG MP-41 Neuhausen Submachine Gun
- Type: Submachine gun
- Place of origin: Switzerland

Production history
- Designer: Jakob Gaetzi, Gotthard End
- Designed: 1941
- Manufacturer: Schweizerische Industrie Gesellschaft (SIG, modern SIG Sauer)
- Produced: c.1941
- No. built: 200

Specifications
- Mass: 4.2kg (empty)
- Length: 800mm
- Cartridge: 9×19mm Parabellum
- Caliber: 9mm
- Action: Simple delayed-blowback
- Rate of fire: 850rpm
- Muzzle velocity: 400 metres per second
- Feed system: 40-round detachable box magazines
- Sights: Iron

SIG MP-41 Neuhausen Submachine Gun is a Swiss submachine gun designed by Schweizerische Industrie Gesellschaft in 1941. It was one of submachine gun candidates for Swiss Army during World War II, but was not chosen. Instead, the Furrer MP41/44 was adopted, mainly due to Colonel Adolf Furrer's influence in the Swiss Army at the time.

The MP41 is a rare firearm, with only about 200 samples ever produced.

== History ==
At the onset of World War II, Switzerland had declared neutrality in the fast-escalating conflict. The prospect of potential invasion by Nazi Germany was a real possibility and in preparation for such scenario, the Kriegs Technisch Amt, sent out an ordnance survey to Swiss Army in May 1940. Upon reviewing the results, the outfit found that the Swiss Army had fewer than 500 submachine guns at their disposal and the matter needed to be rectified urgently.

The Swiss army commissioned SIG and W+F Bern, two of the largest domestic small arms producers in Switzerland, to create new submachine gun prototypes for the Army.

SIG developed the MP-41, which as an evolution of SIG's prior MKMO submachine gun platform. Like the MKMO, the MP-41 retained the swiveling magazine housing that folded horizontally into a groove in the fore-end. A prototype without this feature was also designed.

=== Tests ===
In 1941, the submachine gun trials were held and SIG submitted a batch of 50 units for testing. SIG's competitor was the W+F's Furrer MP41/44. The submachine gun trials were derailed by Colonel Adolf Furrer's influence and due to his actions, the Swiss Army ended up choosing the Furrer MP41/44 over SIG MP41. SIG attempted to market the MP41 abroad, but were blocked from doing so by Switzerland's neutrality laws.

Only 200 MP41s were produced before the design was abandoned.

== Design and operation ==
The SIG MP 41 (although it was predated by the MK33 and MK37 from the 1930s) was a Straight Forward blow back. The weapon was made of forged steel which made it heavy to carry and handle but the firearm worked well. The weapon used 9mm parabellum from a 40-round box magazine and had an 850 rpm cycle rate.

== See also ==
- Lmg-Pist 41/44 AKA Furrer MP41/44 - SIG MP41's rival chosen by Swiss Army
- SIG 310 AKA SIG MP-48 - SIG MP41's successor
- SIG MKMO
- Ingram Model 6

== Notes ==
- The Swiss government body for war preparations.
- Furrer MP41/44 was the more expensive of the two choices. It was also the more complex design, and its components were difficult to clean and maintain in field conditions. Military experts regard adoption of Furrer SMG a mistake on the Swiss Army's part.
