= Haubits m/40 =

10,5 cm Haubits m/40
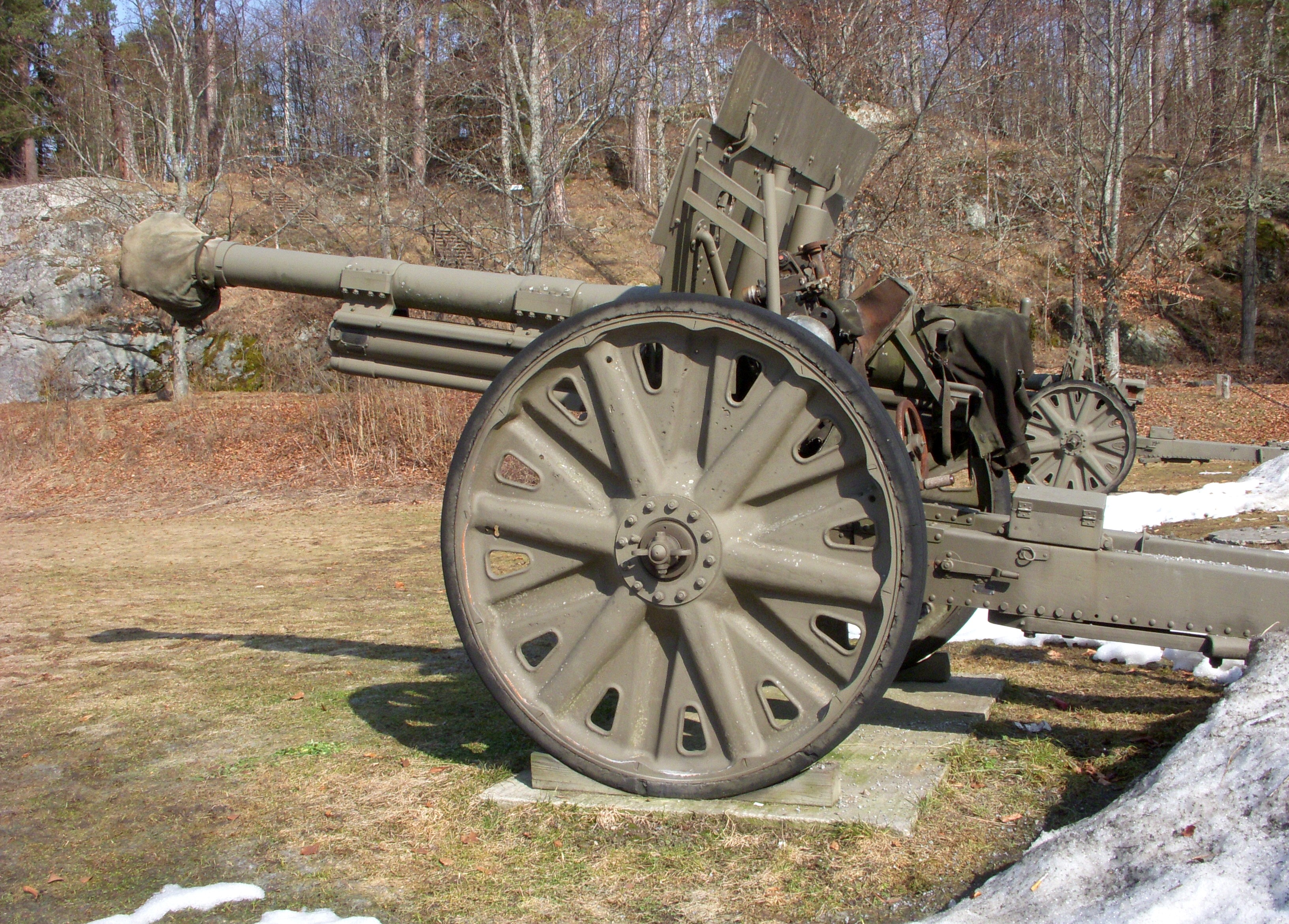
- 10,5 cm Haubits m/40
- Type: Howitzer
- Place of origin: Sweden

Service history
- In service: 1940–present
- Wars: World War II

Production history
- Designer: Bofors
- Designed: 1937
- Manufacturer: Bofors; Tampella
- Produced: 1940–
- Variants: 105 H 37 (Finnish version); 105 H 61-37 (modernized Finnish version); 10.5 cm Hb Model 46 (Swiss version)

Specifications
- Mass: 1,970 kg
- Length: 5.310 m
- Crew: 7 + 3 reserve
- Shell: High explosive
- Caliber: 105 mm
- Breech: Horizontal sliding-wedge breech or interrupted screw breech
- Carriage: Split trail with recoil spades
- Elevation: -5 to +45 degrees
- Traverse: 50 degrees
- Rate of fire: 10 rounds per minute
- Maximum firing range: 10,900 m

The 10,5 cm Haubits m/40 is a Swedish 105 mm howitzer, which was manufactured by Bofors during World War II.

The howitzer was license manufactured both in Finland and in Switzerland. Today, the gun is mainly used as a training gun by the Estonian army.

== Operators ==
Estonia
105 H 61-37 version. Ca. 40 units from Finland. Used as training guns.
Finland
105 H 61-37 version. 140 units, now withdrawn from service, ca. 40 were given to Estonia.
Netherlands
Used in Dutch East Indies
Sweden
10,5 cm Haubits m/40, about 400 units in five versions or alterations.
Switzerland

- 135 x 10.5 cm Hb Model 42 L22 (K+W Thun, Bofors licence)
- 445 x 10.5 cm Hb Model 46 L22 (K+W Thun, Bofors licence)
- 230 x 10.5 cm Hb Model 46/91 L30

Thailand

== Versions ==
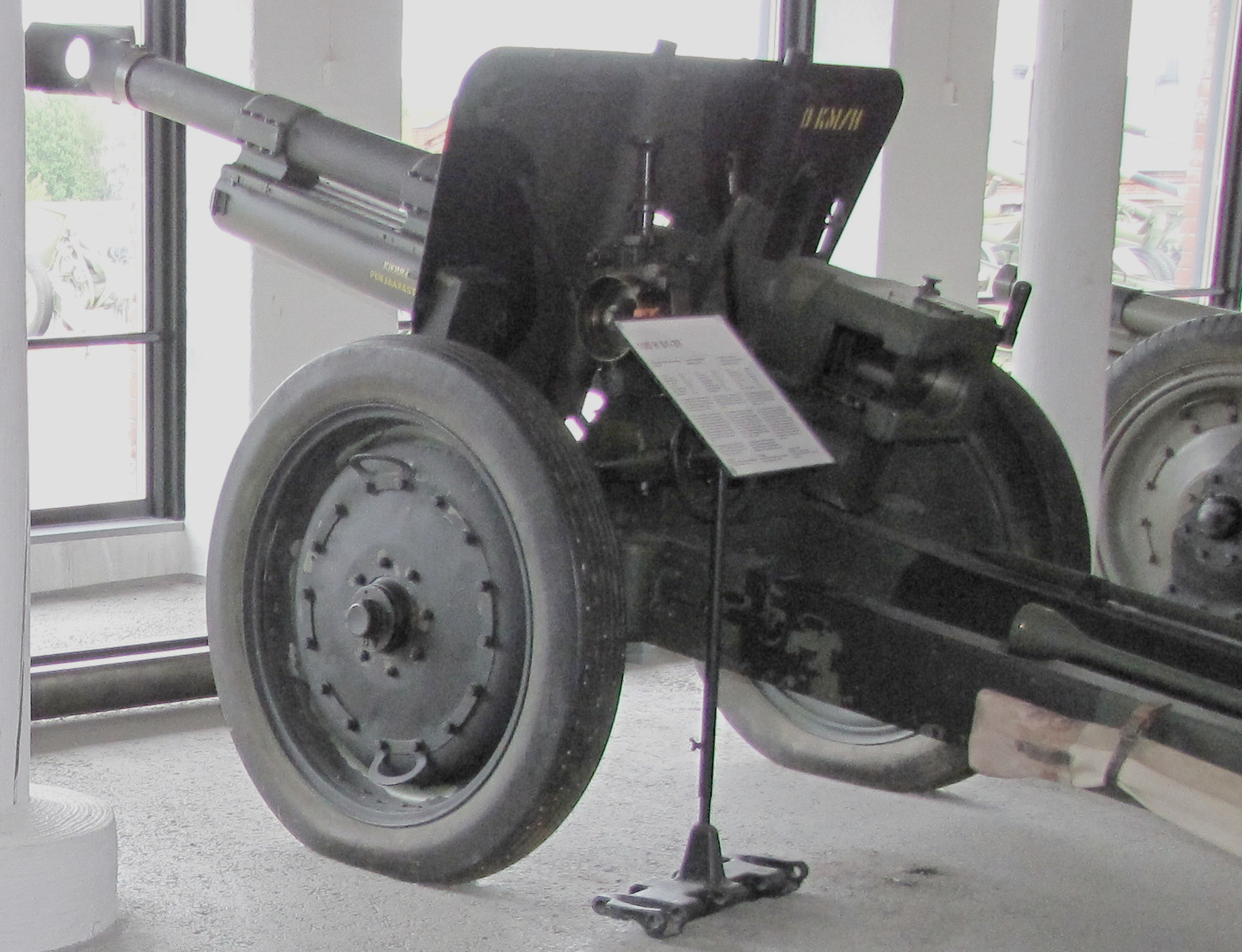
An H 61–37 in Hameenlinna Museum

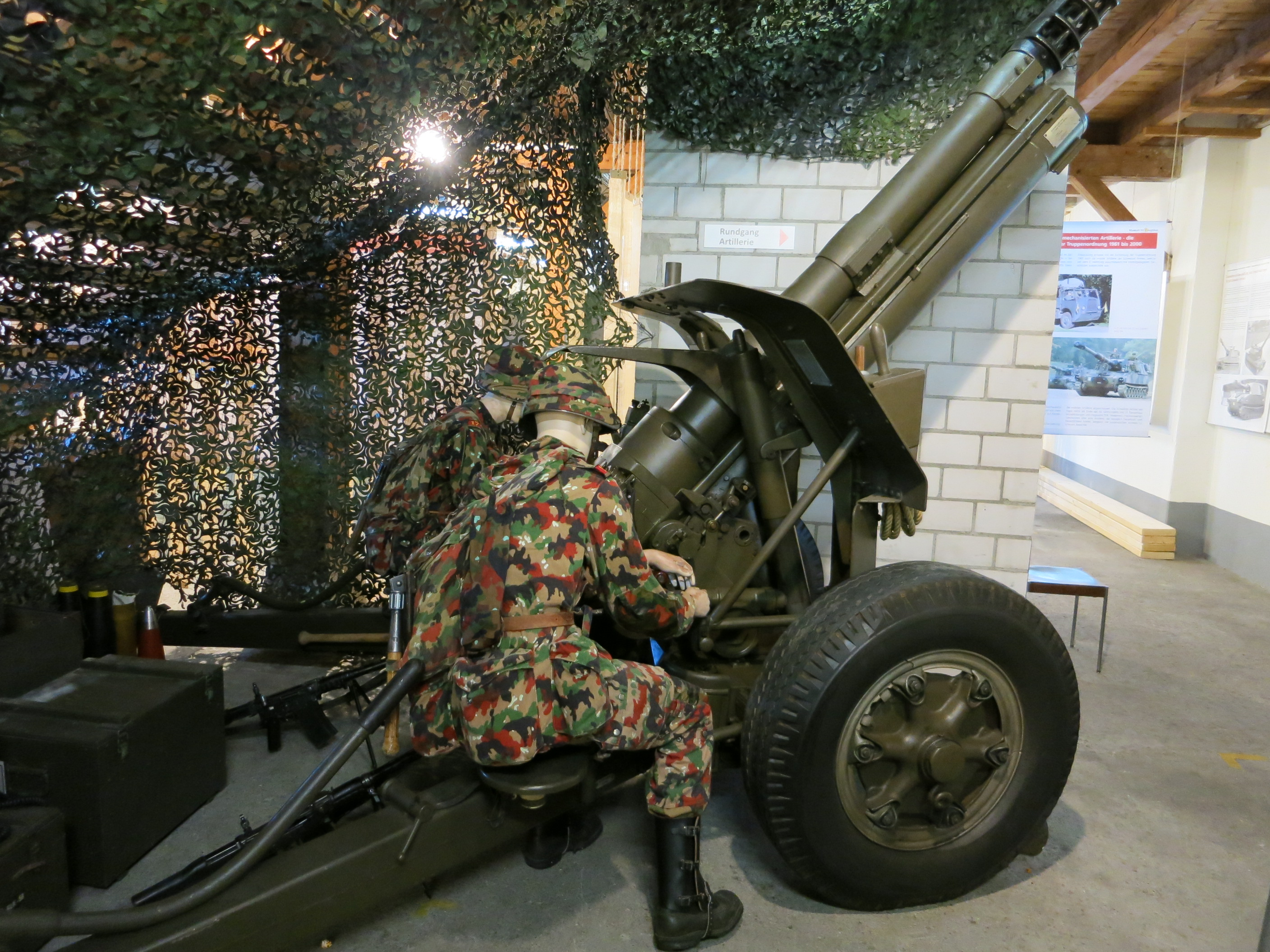
Swiss 10.5 cm Hb Model 46 L22 (K+W Thun, Bofors licence)

10,5 cm Haubits m/40
Original Swedish version
105 H 37
Finnish version manufactured by Tampella
105 H 61-37
Finnish modernized version from the 1960s. Longer L/26 barrel with redesigned muzzle brake, new equilibrators and fixed ammunition for improved rate of fire.
10.5 cm Hb Model 46 L22, 10.5 cm Hb Model 46/91 L30
Swiss versions manufactured in Thun

== Specifications ==
- Era: World War II
- Name: 105 mm Haubits m/40
- Type: Howitzer
- Nation: Sweden
- Manufacturer: Bofors
- Target: General
- Date: 1937
- Production date: 1940–
- Service date: 1940–1990s
- Numbers built
- Operators: Siam (today Thailand), Netherlands East Indies (today's Indonesia) and in Finland built under license from Bofors as the m/37, Switzerland built under license from Bofors as 10,5 cm Hb Model 46
- Breech mechanism: Horizontal sliding-wedge breech or interrupted screw breech
- Barrel: 22 or 24 (bore 20,2 cal)
- Elevation: -5 to +45°
- Traverse: 50°
- Caliber:105×155 mm
- Carriage: Split trail with spades
- Weight: 1970 kg
- Length: 5310 mm
- Shell types:
- Action: Case-type separate loading, 6 charges
- Muzzle velocity: max 449 m/s
- Tactical range: 10,5 km
- Maximum range: 10,9 km
- Rate of fire:
- Crew:7 + 3 reserve
- Transportation: Horse drawn, after 1950 motor traction
- Miscellaneous: Perforated muzzle brake
