= Adolf Furrer =

Swiss military officer and small arms designer

- Born: 13 November 1873; Zürich, Switzerland
- Died: 15 January 1958 (aged 84); Minusio, Switzerland
- Military career
- Allegiance: Switzerland
- Branch: Swiss Army
- Rank: Oberstbrigadier

Adolf Furrer (born Johann Adolf Furrer-Kägi, 13 November 1873 – 15 January 1958) was a Swiss small arms designer. He was the director of the Waffenfabrik Bern for 19 years and held the rank of Oberstbrigadier (Chief Brigadier) (Note: This was before 2004, before Military of Switzerland adopted new rank system.) in the Swiss Army.

Adolf Furrer was involved with numerous firearms designs in the Swiss Army's arsenal in the first half of 20th century. He is most well known for the Furrer MP41/44 submachine gun that Swiss Army adopted during World War II, thanks to passionate lobbying of Swiss Army officials. The Furrer MP41/44 would become regarded as one of the worst firearm designs of World War II and history.

== Background ==
Johann Adolf Furrer-Kägi was born on 13 November 1873 in Zürich, Switzerland. At an unknown time, before 1921, he had joined the Swiss Army. He rose from a junior officer to the rank of Colonel while in service. Around 1921, Colonel Furrer was appointed as head of the Waffenfabrik Bern, state small arms factory. He would remain director of the factory up until 1940.

In 1933, the Furrer Automatic Cannon was introduced to Swiss Air Force service.

In 1941, early in World War II, a review by the Swiss army revealed a lack of submachine guns, with less than 500 in stock. The Swiss army commissioned SIG and W+F Bern, then two of the largest domestic small arms producers in Switzerland, to create new submachine gun prototypes for the Army. Adolf Furrer designed the Lmg-Pist 41/44 (aka Furrer MP41/44) to be produced by Waffenfabrik Bern, while SIG had developed the MP-41 Neuhausen Submachine Gun. The Swiss Army was to hold tests to determine which design would be adopted.

However, Furrer was politically well connected in the Swiss Army and tried passionately to persuade the military to choose his design. Ultimately, the submachine gun trials were derailed with no chance for SIG to present their MP-41's capabilities properly and the Swiss Army would adopt the MP41/44.

Ultimately, the Furrer MP41/44 was plagued with production problems and reliability issues that would cause a great deal of trouble for the Swiss Army and damage Adolf Furrer's reputation. (Note: Because of Furrer's politicking and pushing for his own error-prone submachine gun over the SIG's potentially better design.)

After World War II, Furrer retired from military service and weapons design. Furrer died in 1958 in Minusio, Switzerland at the age of 84.

== Weapons design ==
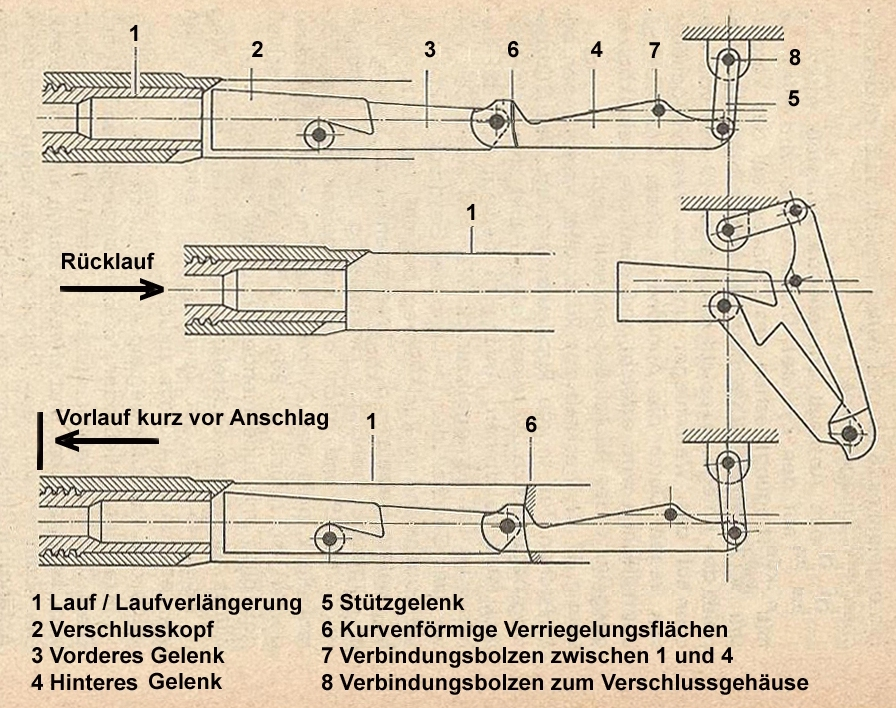
Furrer toggle-lock system

Many of Furrer's designs incorporated the toggle-lock mechanism popularized by the Luger P08. He would utilize it in his designs well into the 1930s and 1940s, when the toggle-lock system was considered outdated design. (Note: Firearms using toggle lock systems were distinctly a late 1800s and early 1900s design. By the 1930s and 1940s, simpler firing mechanisms had been invented and made firearms production easier. Although some firearms using the toggle lock had service lives that lasted past World War II (such as Luger P08 and Vickers Machine Gun), there were essentially no new toggle lock firearms made from the 1930s onwards with the exception of Furrer's own designs.)

In the early part of his firearms design career, Furrer mainly worked with Luger P08 and Maxim guns, which may have influenced his liking for the system. He experimented with stock Luger firing mechanisms and his work would spawn the Furrer 1919 SMG prototype.

=== Designed weaponry ===
Adolf Furrer designed/or contributed to the designs of the following firearms.

- Furrer Fliegerpistole
- Furrer MP19
- Flieger-Doppelpistole
- Swiss M1921 Automatic Carbine
- Leichtes Maschinengewehr Modell 1925
- Karabiner Model 1931 (K31)
- Furrer MP41/44
- 24mm Tankbüchse 41
