= K31 =

Karabiner Modell 1931
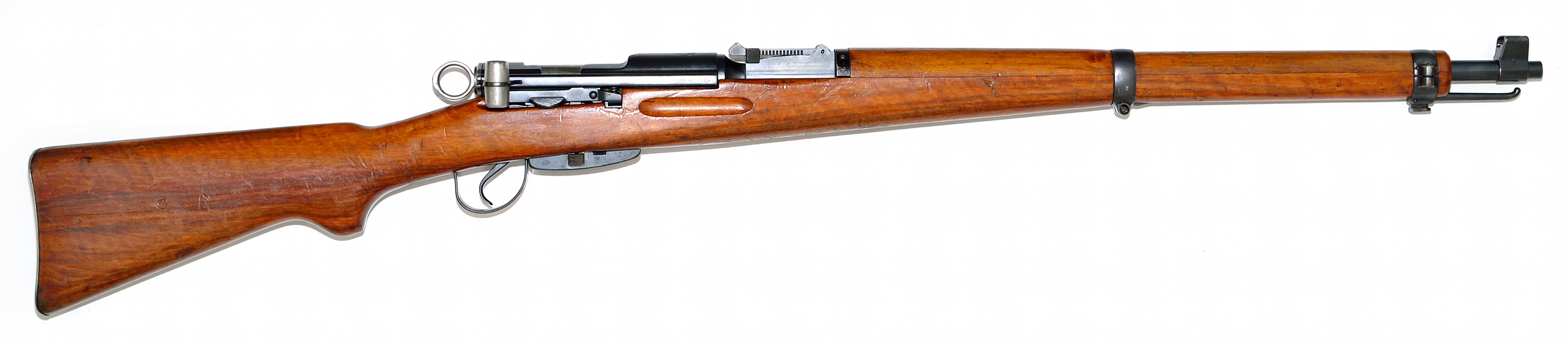
- Karabiner Modell 1931 (Kar. 31) rifle
- Type: Straight-pull bolt action carbine
- Place of origin: Switzerland

Service history
- In service: 1933–1970
- Used by: See Users

Production history
- Designer: Waffenfabrik Bern
- Designed: May 1931
- Manufacturer: Waffenfabrik Bern
- No. built: 528,230

Specifications
- Mass: 4.0 kg (8.82 lb) empty
- Length: 1,105 mm (43.50 in)
- Barrel length: 652 mm (25.67 in)
- Cartridge: 7.5×55mm Swiss
- Action: Straight-pull bolt action
- Muzzle velocity: 780 m/s (2,559 ft/s)
- Effective firing range: 500 m (547 yd)
- Maximum firing range: 5,500 m (6,015 yd) at 37° using plunging fire
- Feed system: 6-round detachable box magazine A rifle grenade launcher was available from 1944 onward.
- Sights: Iron sights or telescopic sight

The Karabiner Modell 1931 (officially abbreviated to Kar. 31/Mq. 31; commonly but incorrectly known in civilian circles as the K31) is a magazine-fed, straight-pull bolt-action rifle. It was the standard-issue rifle of the Swiss armed forces from 1933 until 1958, though examples remained in service into the 1970s. It has a 6-round removable magazine, and is chambered for the 7.5×55mm Swiss Gewehrpatrone 1911 or GP 11, a cartridge with ballistic qualities similar to the 7.62×51mm NATO/.308 Winchester cartridge. Each rifle included a 6-round detachable box magazine with matching stamped serial number. A stripper clip can be used to load the magazine from the top of the receiver.

The Karabiner Modell 1931 replaced both the Model 1911 rifle and carbine and was gradually replaced by the Stgw 57 from 1958 onwards.

Although the Kar. 31 is a straight-pull carbine broadly based on previous Swiss "Schmidt–Rubin" service rifles and carbines, the Kar. 31 was not designed by Colonel Rudolf Schmidt (1832–1898) as he was not alive in 1931 to do so. Mechanical engineer Eduard Rubin (1846–1920) was the designer of the 7.5×55mm Swiss ammunition that previous Swiss service rifles and the Kar. 31 are chambered for. The Karabiner Modell 31 was a new design by the Eidgenössische Waffenfabrik in Bern, Switzerland under Colonel Adolf Furrer (1873–1958). The first 200 Kar. 31s were made in May 1931 for troop trials (serials 500,001 – 500,200), thus the model number of 1931.

== Design details ==
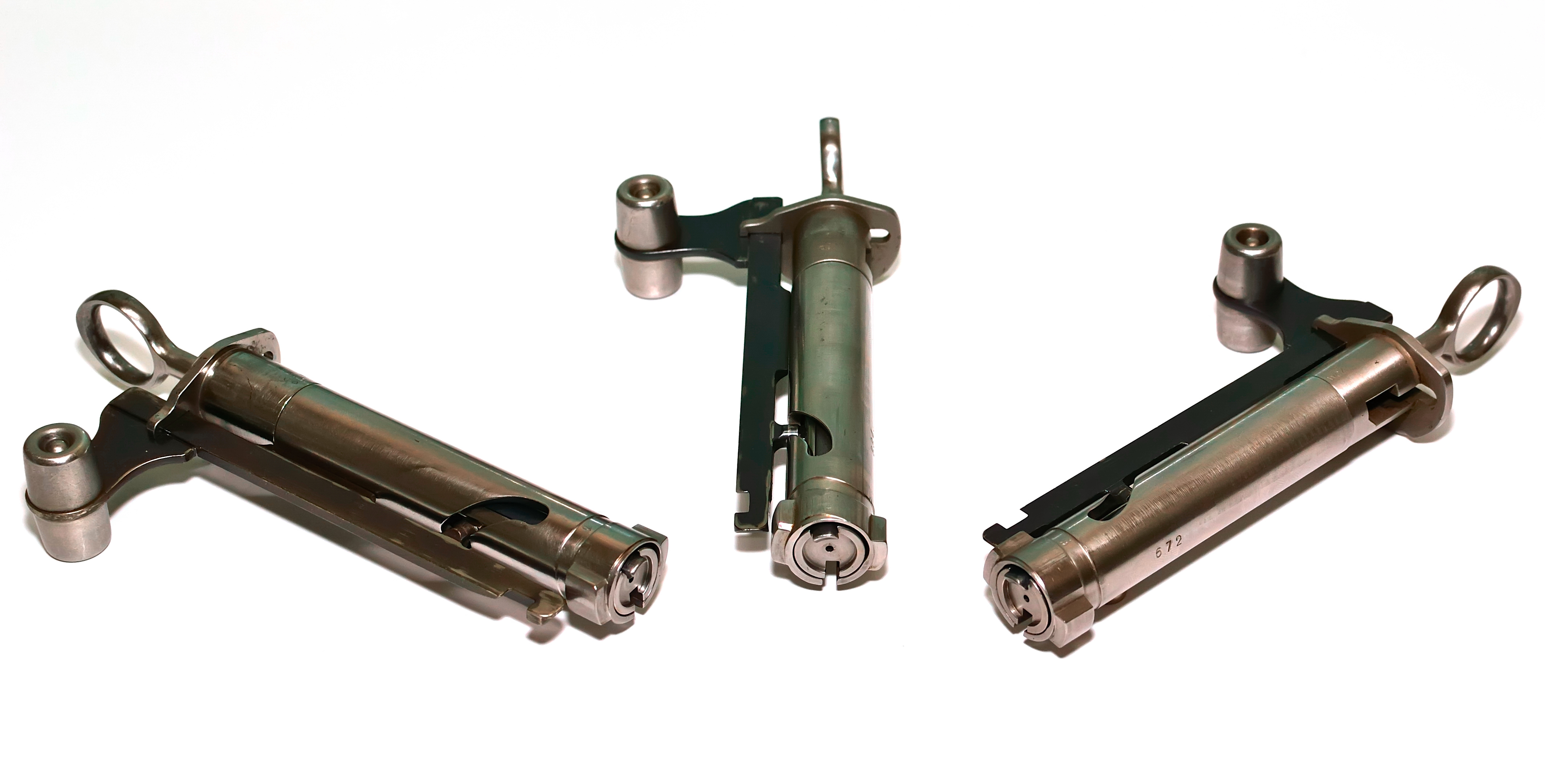
Kar. 31's straight-pull bolt action bolt group

=== Features ===
Compared to the previous Schmidt–Rubin series Model 1911 rifle and carbine, the Karabiner Modell 31 bolt and receiver were significantly shortened, allowing for a rifle length barrel and sight radius, without increasing the overall length of the Model 1911 carbine, moving the rear sight element closer to the eye, and cutting in half the amount of time for the firing pin to strike the cartridge after the trigger was pulled.

The Karabiner Modell 31 barrel has 4 rifling grooves and a 270 mm (10.63 in) rifling twist rate. The action itself is only connected to the stock by two screws, one attaching to the recoil lug, with the second attaching to the tang. This allowed the Swiss to eliminate the aluminium barrel mounting collar used in the Schmidt-Rubin series. The trigger was also redesigned.

Karabiner Modell 31s are noted for their excellent accuracy and quality for a service rifle. The Swiss armed forces considered individual marksmanship to be of utmost importance. Therefore, the K. 31/Kar. 31 was made to tight tolerances and excellent overall craftsmanship. According to the Swiss Military manual for the Karabiner Modell 31 using standard issue 7.5×55mm Swiss GP 11 ball ammunition in a fixed mounting the expected accuracy of fire at a range of 300 m (328 yd) is 4 cm (1.6 in) (R_{50}) in the horizontal (windage) axis and 6 cm (2.4 in) (R_{50}) in the vertical (elevation) axis. Accuracy of fire at a range of 1,000 m (1,094 yd) is 21 cm (8 in) (R_{50}) in the horizontal axis and 43 cm (16.9 in) (R_{50}) in the vertical axis. R_{50} at a range means the closest 50% of the shot group will all be within a circle of the mentioned diameter at that distance. The employed circular error probable method cannot be converted and is not comparable to US military methods for determining rifle accuracy. For reference a 1 minute of arc (MOA) circle at 300 m (328 yd) has a diameter of 8.72 cm (3.4 in) and at 1,000 m (1,094 yd) has a diameter of 29.08 cm (11.4 in). When the R_{50} results are doubled the hit probability increases to 93.7%.

=== Kar. 31 straight-pull action system ===
The Karabiner Modell 31 is noted for its straight-pull bolt action, meaning that the bolt handle is pulled directly rearward to unlock the action, cock the striker and eject the spent cartridge case in one motion, and then pushing the bolt handle forward again to chamber a new cartridge and lock the action, rather than being manually turned and pulled back and forth, as in contemporary bolt action service rifles, like the German Karabiner 98k, or the British Lee–Enfield Rifle No. 4. A straight-pull bolt action reduces the range of motion by the shooter, with the goal of increasing the rifle's rate of fire.

Unlike the previous Schmidt–Rubin series of rifles, the Kar. 31's locking lugs lock up immediately behind the chamber. This forward positioning of the locking lugs affords several advantages. The entire action is strengthened as the lugs lock into the much thicker forward part of the receiver. Lock-up is also more precise.

=== Safety ===
The cocking piece doubles as a safety and is attached at the rear of the bolt sleeve assembly and secures the firing pin. When the cocking piece ending in a cocking ring is pulled rearward and turned horizontal, the cocking piece sear can be placed in a recessed safety slot in the bolt plug. This slot is shorter than the firing slot so the firing pin cannot protrude past the face of the bolt cylinder. Any contact with the cartridge primer is thus prevented. The safe mode also prevents the action from being cycled hence preventing the bolt from accidental opening. The operating ring is quite large, making it easy to operate with gloves. When the operating ring is in the vertical position and pulled back by cycling the action or cocking it by hand the action is ready to fire.

=== Ammunition feeding ===
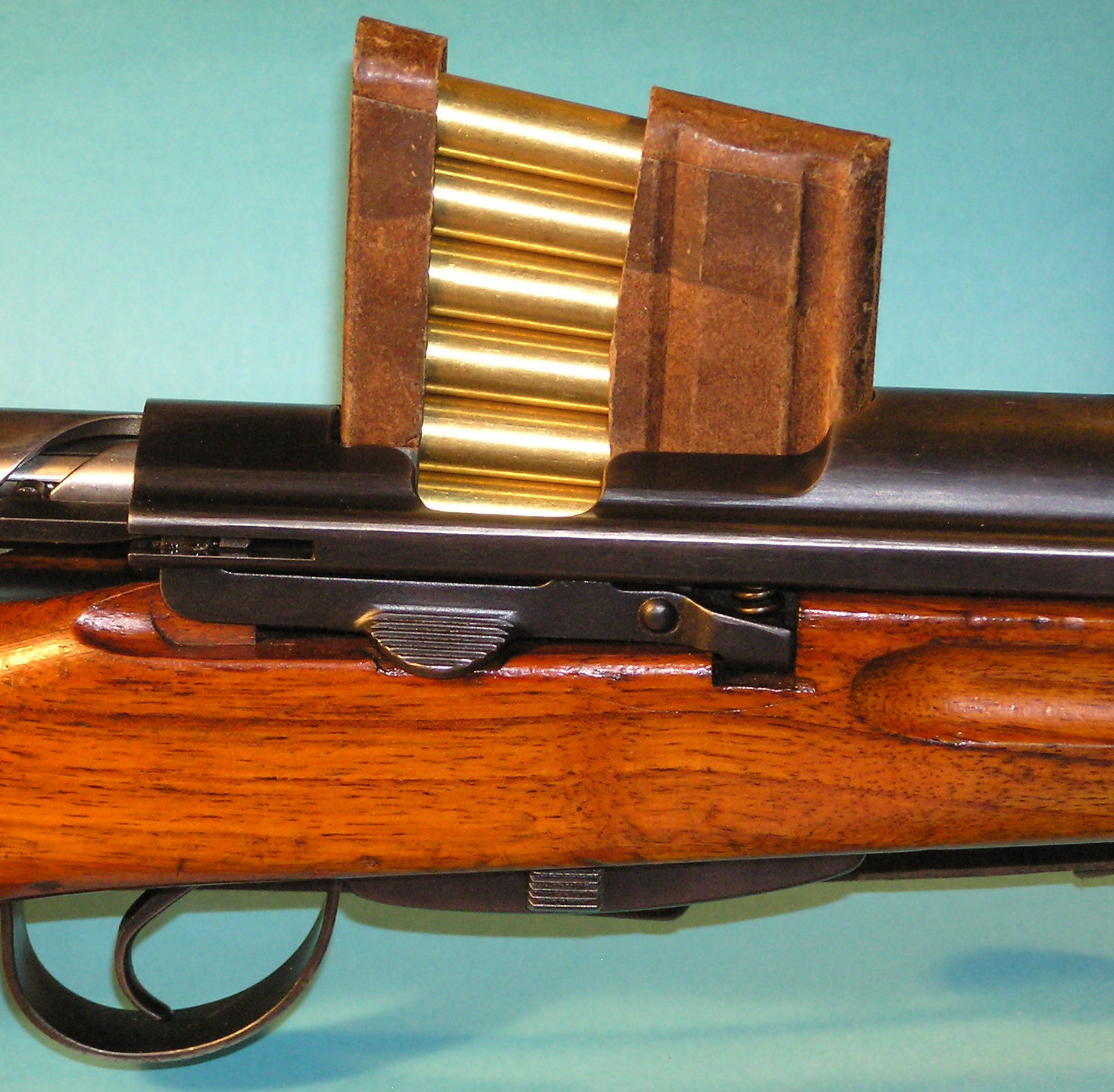
Stripper clip inserted in Kar. 31

The Karabiner Modell 31 feeds from a detachable box magazine machined to match the cartridge for which the rifle was being chambered, that can hold up to 6 rifle cartridges. The magazine release button is an integral part of the magazine. For reloading the Kar. 31 box magazine was normally not exchanged for another magazine but a unique formed phenolic resin embedded paper stripper clip with a tinned metal edge holding six rounds was used. Whereas most chargers or stripper clips only held the rounds at the end of the cartridge cases, the Kar. 31 charger nearly covers the entire cartridge. The charger has a guide slot wide enough for a gloved thumb to force rounds down and into the magazine in one smooth motion. The chargers or stripper clips have to be manually removed before the bolt can be closed. When the last cartridge from the magazine is fired, the follower comes up automatically during cycling locking the bolt open and preventing it from closing reminding the user the Kar. 31 needs to be reloaded.

=== Trigger ===
The Karabiner Modell 31 has a two-stage trigger with a noticeable long take up before the trigger engages the sear. This feature aids in preventing premature firing during stressful (combat) situations.

=== Sights ===
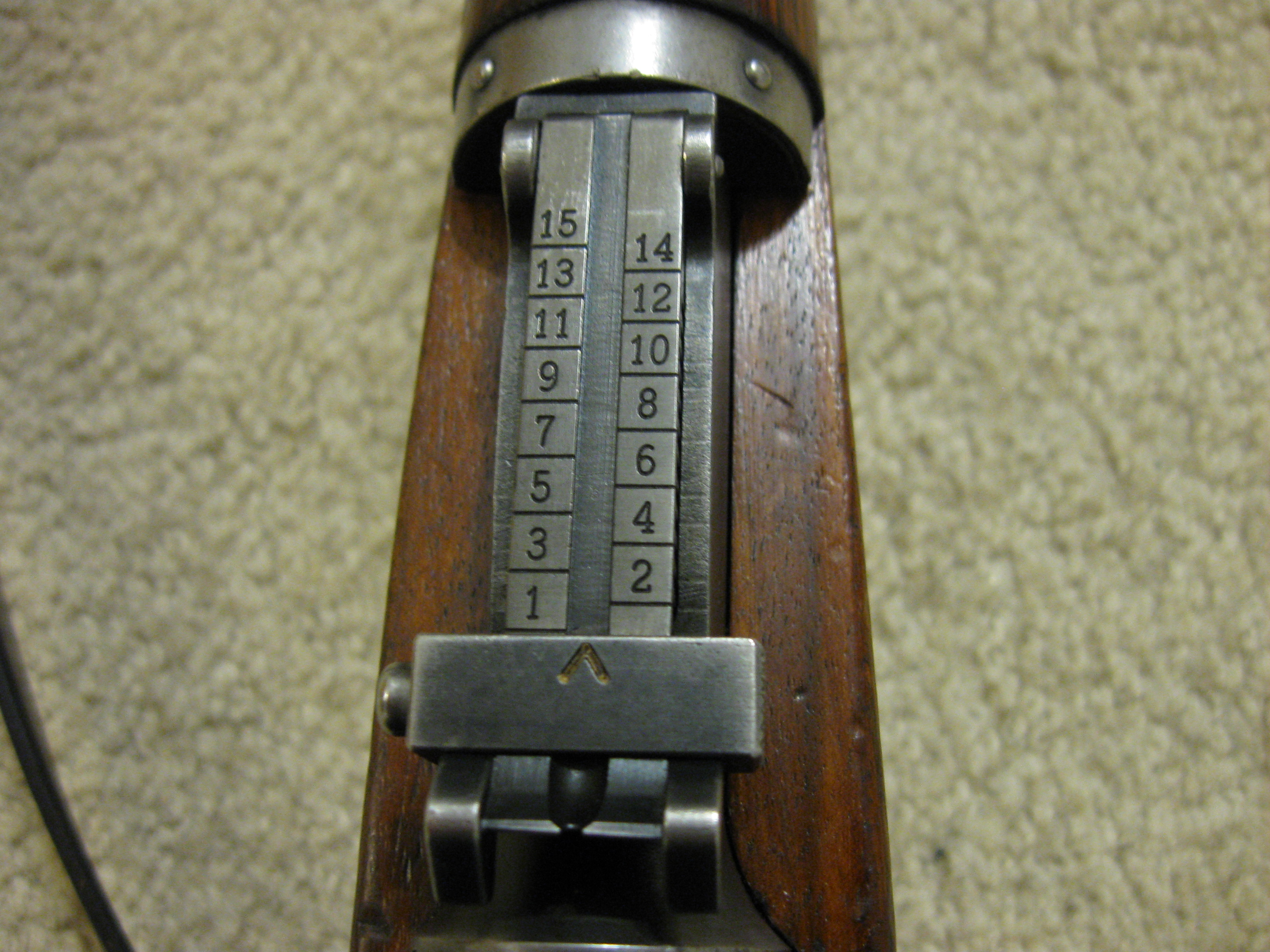
Tangent rear sight

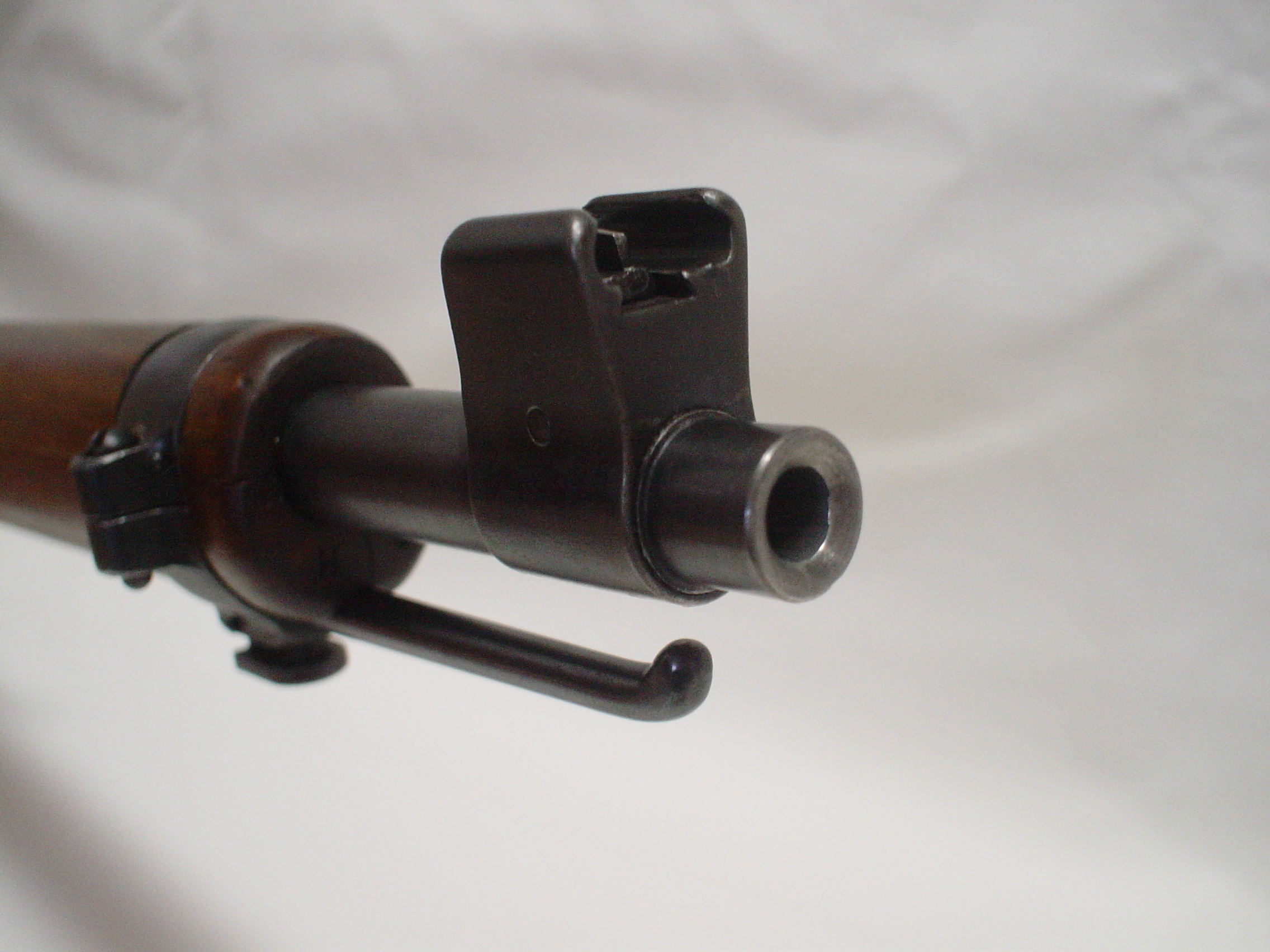
Front sight post

K31 open sights arrangement

The standard iron sights on a Karabiner Modell 31 are open sights that can be adjusted for both windage and elevation and have a sight radius of 568 mm (22.36 in). The rear sight is graduated from 100–1,500 m (109–1,640 yd) in 100 m (109 yd) increments. The sight line can be adjusted with a front sight adjustment tool. Moving the front post 1 mm (0.04 in) horizontally results in a 120 mm (4.72 in) shift at 300 m (328 yd). To adjust the average height of the point of impact 5 front posts ranging from 5.9 to 7.1 mm (0.23 to 0.28 in) height in 0.3 mm (0.012 in) increments are available. The change in impact height from one front sight to the next is 160 mm (6.30 in) at 300 m (328 yd).

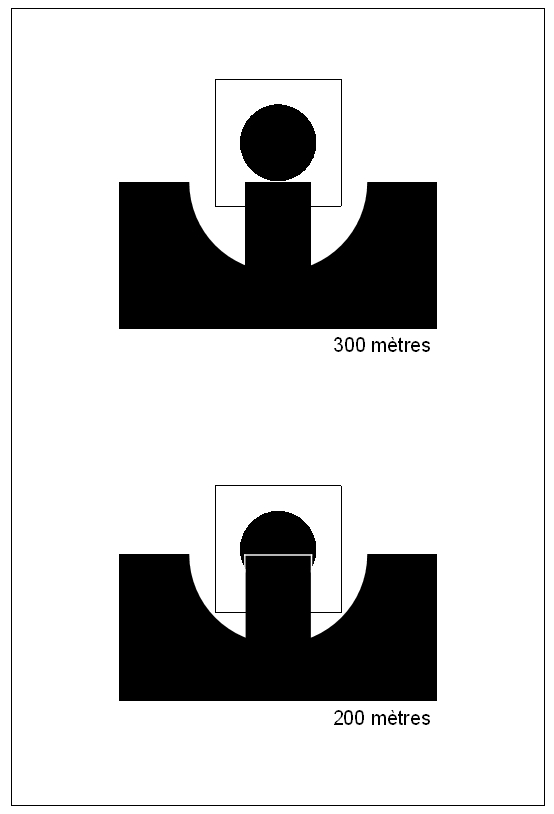
Kar. 31 6 o'clock hold for 300 m (328 yd) and center hold for 200 m (219 yd)

The standard Kar. 31 iron sight line elevation concept is somewhat unconventional and designed for center hold (point of aim = point of impact) at the 100 m (109 yd) and 200 m (219 yd) meter settings with GP11 ammunition. Starting at 300 m (328 yd) and more distant ranges the shooter should aim below the bottom of the target, so that the front sight's post is just out of the way. The 6 o'clock hold is intended for target shooting at 300 m (328 yd), meaning the sight line is designed to let GP11 ammunition hit 30 cm (11.8 in) over the point of aim on a 60 cm (23.6 in) diameter bulls eye the Swiss military and shooting clubs used for sighting in the Kar. 31, marksmanship training and competitions. A 6 o'clock hold is only good for a known target size at a known distance and will not hold zero without user adjustment if these factors are varied. Combined with GP11 ammunition the 300 m (328 yd) and 400 m (437 yd) settings can alternatively be used as center holds for 400 m (437 yd) and 500 m (547 yd).

As the Swiss have a militia army where soldiers sometimes keep their service rifles for a lifetime and also compete with their service rifle. Many aftermarket sights were available: Waffenfabrik Bern made the "S" and "K" (Klammer) diopter sights, Wyss makes the "W" diopter and Furter, Haemmerli and Gruenig & Elmiger made special windage and elevation fine-correctors, Sahli and many other made elevation fine correctors and these days a company by the name of Swiss Products in the United States makes a clamp-on diopter which was recently approved for use at official Swiss shooting matches.

=== Modifications history ===
During its production run there were several modifications tested, rejected and made to the Kar. 31.

| Year | Description |
|---|---|
| 1934 | The firing pin was lightened. |
| 1935 | The receiver was made from hardened steel. |
| 1936 | The magazine was made from hardened steel. |
| 1941 | Stocks made from laminated plywood were tested, but rejected. |
| 1944 | Due to supply shortages, Chromium Molybdenum Steel was use in place of Chromium Nickel Steel on various parts. This experiment proved unsuccessful. |
| 1946 | Starting with Kar. 31 serial number 868,901, beech wood stocks replaced the walnut used previously, although existing stores of NOS walnut stocks manufactured in 1944 appear in production Kar. 31 rifles as late as 1954. |

=== Accessories ===
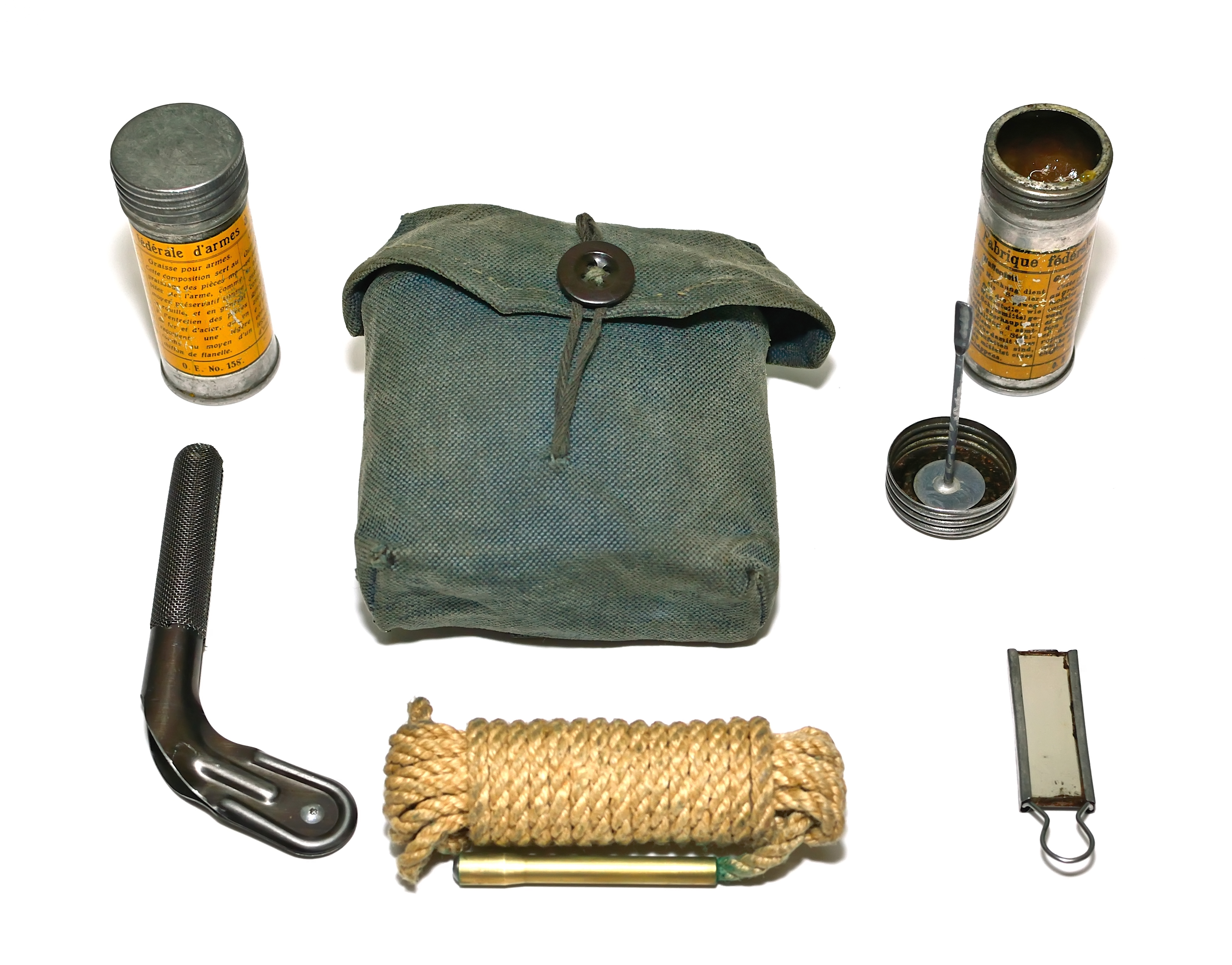
cleaning kit

Karabiner Modell 31s were issued with slings, muzzle caps, knife-type detachable bayonets, cleaning kits and carrying pouches for stripper clips.

== Variants ==
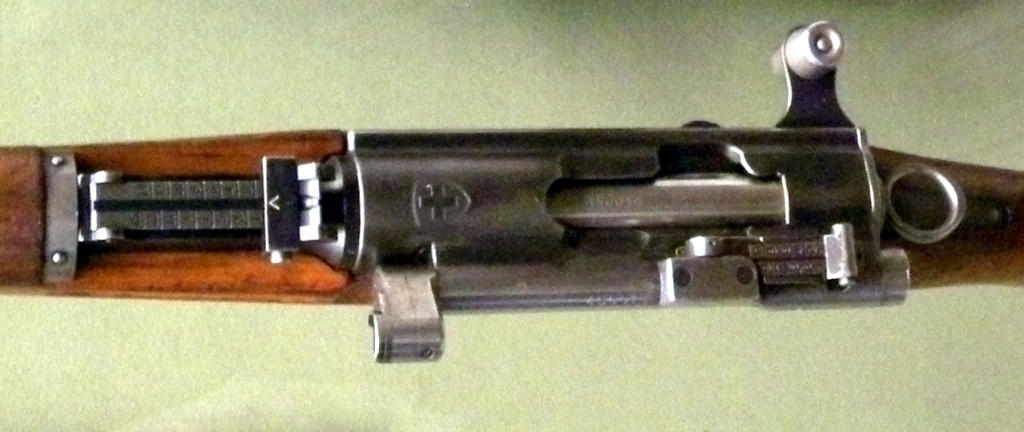
Zf. Kar. 31/43 rifle, telescope objective swinged out

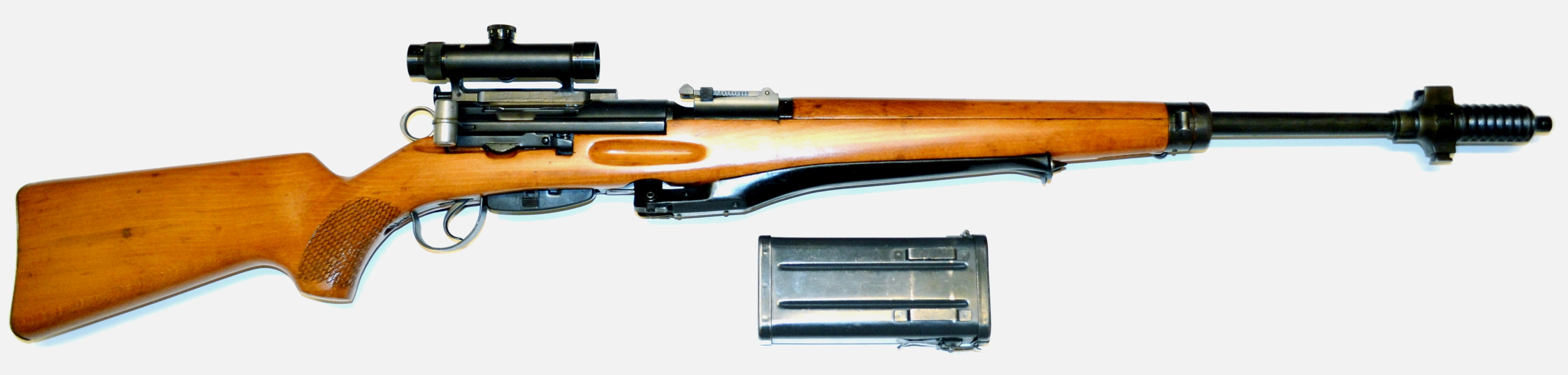
Zf. Kar. 55 rifle and telescopic sight storage container

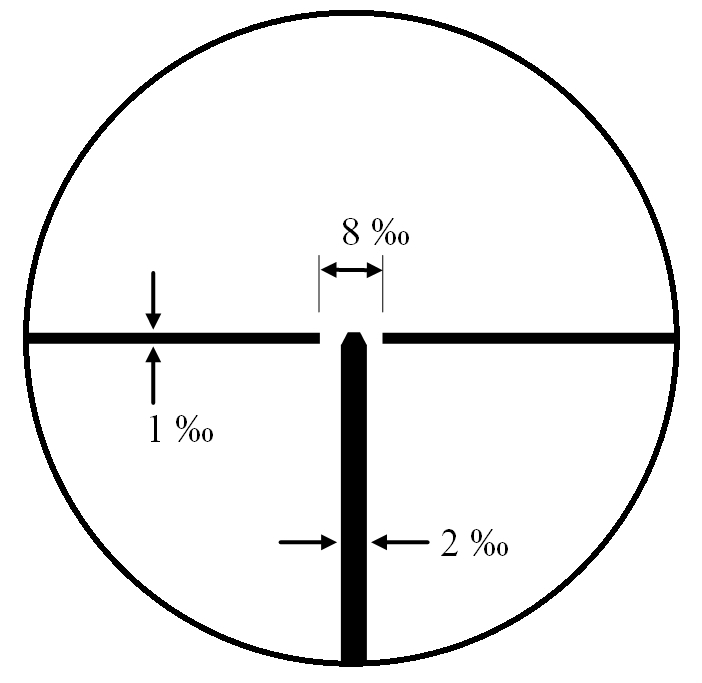
Reticle of the Kern 3.5×23 telescopic sight

There were three Karabiner Modell 31 variants that featured telescopic sights. These were the:

- Zf. Kar. 31/42, 1.8×9 telescopic sight adjustable from 100–1,000 m (109–1,094 yd) in 100 m (109 yd) increments
- Zf. Kar. 31/43, 2.8×14 telescopic sight adjustable from 100–700 m (109–766 yd) in 100 m (109 yd) increments

The telescopic sights of these models were made by Kern and mounted on production Karabiner Modell 31s chosen for their accuracy offset on the left side of the receiver enabling the shooter to use the standard iron sight line.

In the 1950s an elaborate modified variant of the Karabiner Modell 31 was developed for designated marksman/sniper use. This rifle was not issued as a Model 31 variant, but as the Zielfernrohr-Karabiner 55 (Zf. Kar. 55) sniper rifle. It featured a more powerful 3.5×23 telescopic sight made by Kern adjustable for bullet drop from 100–800 m (109–875 yd) in 100 m (109 yd) increments. The bullet drop compensation (BDC) adjustment turret is free spinning under grease friction. Like the standard K. 31/Kar. 31 iron sight line elevation concept the BDC adjustment of the telescopic sight is somewhat unconventional and designed for center hold (point of aim = point of impact) at the 100–300 m (109–328 yd) settings with GP11 ammunition. At more distant ranges the shooter should aim below the bottom of the target for a 6 o'clock hold, so that the reticle's post is just out of the way. The windage adjustment turret of the telescopic sight features more conventional click adjustments. Each full windage increment corresponds to a horizontal displacement of 45 cm (17.7 in), i.e. the width of a man at 300 m (328 yd) (1.5 mil/1.5 ‰). The full increments are themselves subdivided into six 7.5 cm (3.0 in) at 300 m (328 yd) (0.25 mil/0.25 ‰) clicks. The Zf. Kar. 55 weighs 6.1 kg (13 lb) empty with the telescopic sight mounted and has an overall length of 1,210 mm (47.64 in). The Zf. Kar. 55 only has four small parts in common (the cocking piece, the firing pin, the firing pin spring, and the extractor) with the Karabiner Modell 31. The telescopic sight mounts are an integral part of the receiver. The 3.5×23 telescopic sight features an integral quick release mount that connects to the mounts on the left side of the receiver. The entire action of the Zf. Kar. 55 is tilted at an angle of approximately 15 degrees to provide room for the unimpaired loading and ejecting cartridges with the telescopic sight mounted. The tilting of the action and magazine also provided a centered position of the telescopic sight over the action and stock at the cost of widening the rifle somewhat. The barrel fitted to the Zf. Kar. 55 is heavier than the one on the Karabiner Modell 31 and is fitted with a muzzle brake. The Zf. Kar. 55 also has a half-stock with a checkered pistol grip instead of a semi-pistol grip and an underfolding integrated bipod. A total of 4,150 Zf. Kar. 55s where manufactured.

== Poor stock condition ==
An example of a marked and lined K31 stock

The poor condition of many stocks was caused mostly by the wearing of crampons (ice-cleats that project not only from the sole but the sides of the heels) worn over hobnail boots and rifle drills that were common. The military habit of stacking rifles in threes – often in the snow – also contributes to the 'ragged' appearance of the end of the butt. Postwar beech stocks are more affected than the older walnut ones. Walnut stocks – the material of choice prior to 1946 – were treated with linseed oil and later beech stocks got a shellac protective layer that easily dissolves in alcohol for (arsenal) repairs.

== Availability ==
As of 2010, the Swiss arsenals are long sold out and the rifles now available for sale from military surplus vendors in countries around the world are ex-Swiss-civilian owned rifles. The stocks are usually in average condition, but the barrel and bolt assembly are usually in very good condition because the Swiss used a special gun grease known as Waffenfett instead of gun cleaning oil, and the issued ammunition was non-corrosive. Some Kar. 31s can be found with "troop tags" underneath the steel butt plate at the rear end of the stock, showing its former Swiss government user. Many collectors of the Kar. 31 recovered a small tag of plasticized paper containing the military unit, name and address and national insurance number of the Swiss citizen to whom the rifle was issued. In some cases, collectors have used the information to contact the previous users, and have recounted the details of those encounters on a variety of collector web forums.

== Accuracy potential ==
Karabiner Modell 31s are noted for their excellent accuracy and quality for a service rifle. The Swiss armed forces considered individual marksmanship to be of utmost importance. Therefore, the Kar. 31 was made to tight tolerances and excellent overall craftsmanship. The Swiss Military manual for the Karabiner Modell 31 using standard issue 7.5×55mm Swiss GP 11 ball ammunition in a fixed mounting mentions the expected accuracy of fire at various ranges.

The following table lists accuracy statistics for typical in service K31 rifles firing 7.5×55mm Swiss GP 11 service ammunition. The statistics were computed under the 1930s era Swiss method for determining accuracy, which is more complex than Western methods which usually involve firing a group of shots and then measuring the overall diameter of the group. The Swiss method differs in that after a group of shots is fired into the target from a machine rest hits on the outer part of the target are disregarded, while only half of the hits on the inner part of the circles are counted (50% or R_{50}), which significantly reduces the overall diameter of the groups. The vertical and horizontal measurements of the reduced groups are then used to measure accuracy. This circular error probable method used by the Swiss and other European militaries cannot be converted and is not comparable to US military methods for determining rifle accuracy. When the R_{50} results are doubled the hit probability increases to 93.7%.

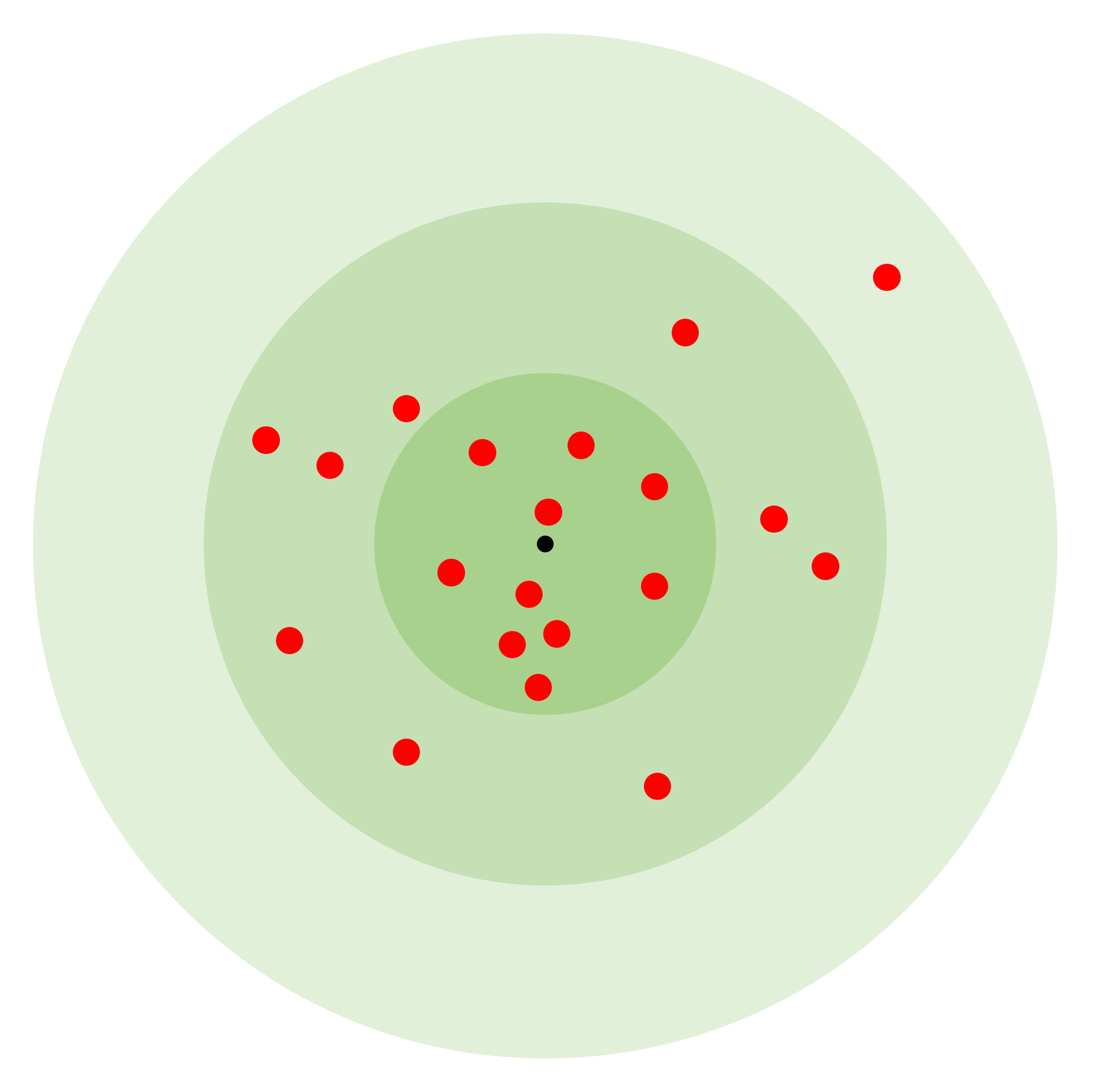
Circular error probable 20 hits distribution example

K31 machine rest dispersion with Swiss GP 11 service ammunition
| Range | Horizontal accuracy of fire (R_{50}) | Vertical accuracy of fire (R_{50}) |
|---|---|---|
| 0 m (0 yd) | 0 cm (0.0 in) | 0 cm (0.0 in) |
| 100 m (109 yd) | 1 cm (0.4 in) | 2 cm (0.8 in) |
| 200 m (219 yd) | 3 cm (1.2 in) | 4 cm (1.6 in) |
| 300 m (328 yd) | 4 cm (1.6 in) | 6 cm (2.4 in) |
| 400 m (437 yd) | 6 cm (2.4 in) | 9 cm (3.5 in) |
| 500 m (547 yd) | 8 cm (3.1 in) | 12 cm (4.7 in) |
| 600 m (656 yd) | 11 cm (4.3 in) | 16 cm (6.3 in) |
| 800 m (875 yd) | 15 cm (5.9 in) | 27 cm (10.6 in) |
| 1,000 m (1,094 yd) | 21 cm (8.3 in) | 43 cm (16.9 in) |

K31 good marksman average dispersion with Swiss GP 11 service ammunition
| Range | Horizontal accuracy of fire (R_{50}) | Vertical accuracy of fire (R_{50}) |
|---|---|---|
| 0 m (0 yd) | 0 cm (0.0 in) | 0 cm (0.0 in) |
| 100 m (109 yd) | 5 cm (2.0 in) | 4 cm (1.6 in) |
| 200 m (219 yd) | 9 cm (3.5 in) | 8 cm (3.1 in) |
| 300 m (328 yd) | 12 cm (4.7 in) | 12 cm (4.7 in) |
| 400 m (437 yd) | 17 cm (6.7 in) | 17 cm (6.7 in) |
| 500 m (547 yd) | 21 cm (8.3 in) | 23 cm (9.1 in) |
| 600 m (656 yd) | 25 cm (9.8 in) | 29 cm (11.4 in) |
| 700 m (766 yd) | 30 cm (11.8 in) | 35 cm (13.8 in) |
| 800 m (875 yd) | 34 cm (13.4 in) | 41 cm (16.1 in) |
| 900 m (984 yd) | 38 cm (15.0 in) | 47 cm (18.5 in) |
| 1,000 m (1,094 yd) | 42 cm (16.5 in) | 54 cm (21.3 in) |

- R_{50} means the closest 50 percent of the shot group will all be within a circle of the mentioned diameter.
- R_{93.7} means the closest 93.7 percent of the shot group will all be within a circle of the mentioned diameter.

For reference a 1 minute of arc (MOA) circle at 300 m (328 yd) has a diameter of 8.72 cm (3.4 in) and at 1,000 m (1,094 yd) has a diameter of 29.08 cm (11.4 in). The radius of a circle is half its diameter.

== Civilian use ==
Outside of Switzerland, the Karabiner Modell 31 is like other (ex) Swiss service rifles used for target shooting matches. Recreational practice with guns is a popular form of recreation, and is encouraged by the government, particularly for the members of the militia. Typical Swiss rifle shooting (Eidgenössisches Feldschiessen) is done with an (ex) Swiss service rifle at a range of 300 m (328 yd), prone. For this the standard iron sights can be replaced by target shooting diopter and globe sight sighting lines. In other countries the Kar. 31 can often be used in vintage military service rifle matches. Clamp-on sighting options for competition diopter style sights and telescopic sights make it easier to mount more precise aiming means than the standard factory tangent iron sights on the receiver. Many competition shooters are able to achieve 1 MOA shooting groups with unmodified Kar. 31s with the factory tangent iron sight line.

To celebrate its introduction in the Swiss armed forces a small commemorative batch of Karabiner Modell 31s was produced 80 years later.

In rare instances, the locking lugs of some Kar. 31 rifles can develop cracks that can be visually determined by the naked eye or with the help of a loupe. Rifles with substandard locking lugs should be immediately be withdrawn from shooting and professionally repaired to prevent dangerous situations.

== Gallery ==
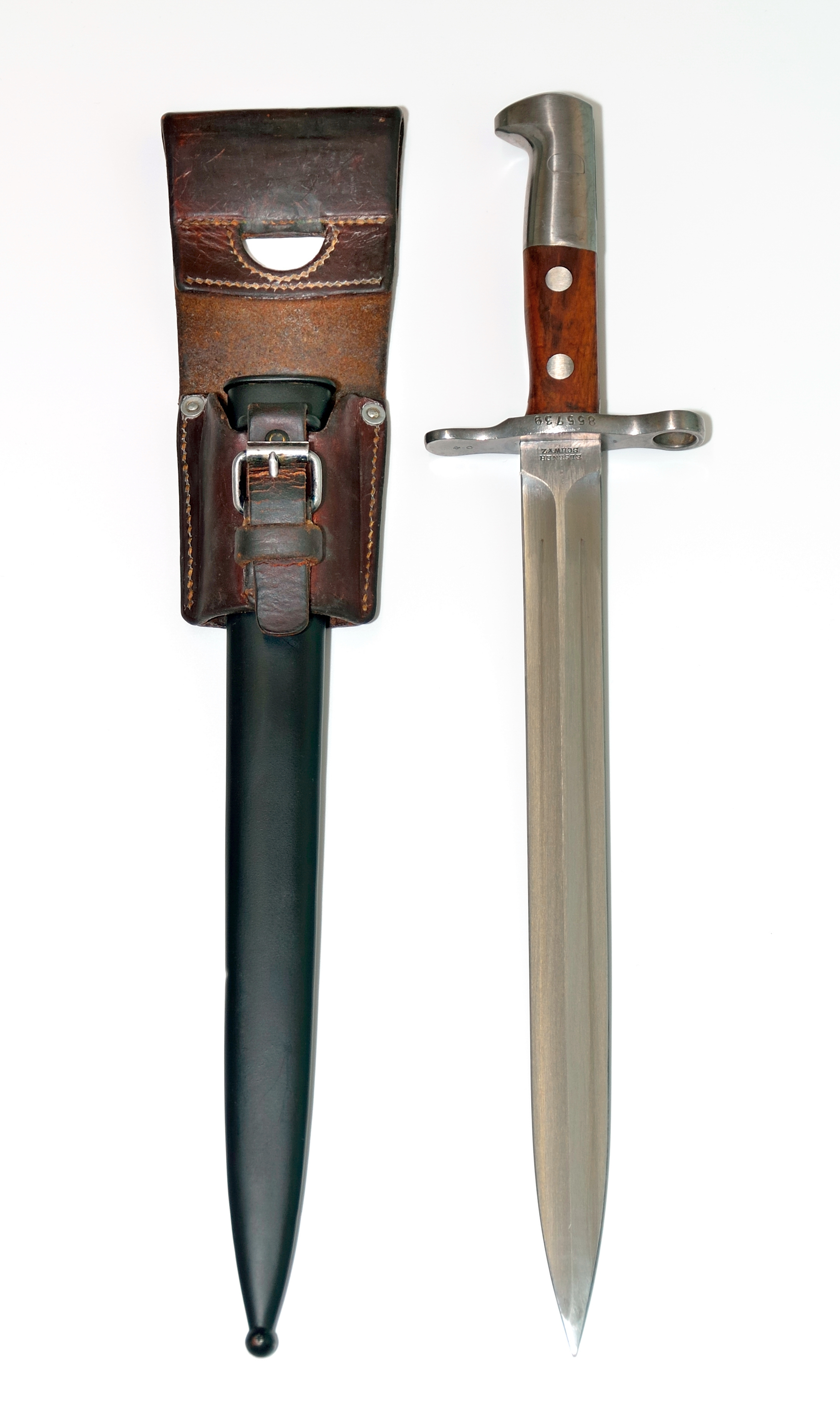
Kar. 31 bayonet M1918 and its frog.

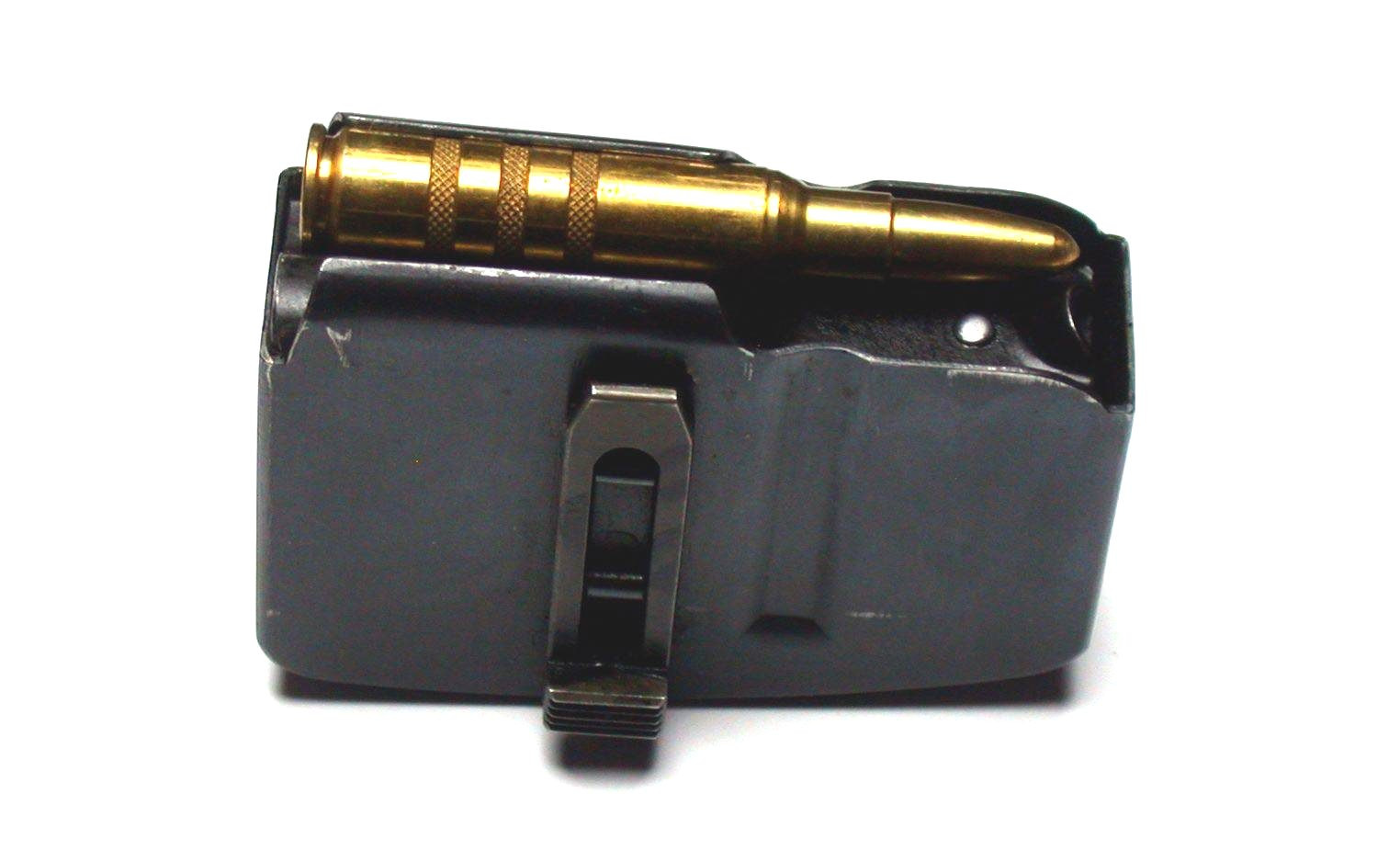
Kar. 31 box magazine loaded with inert 7.5×55mm Swiss training cartridge.

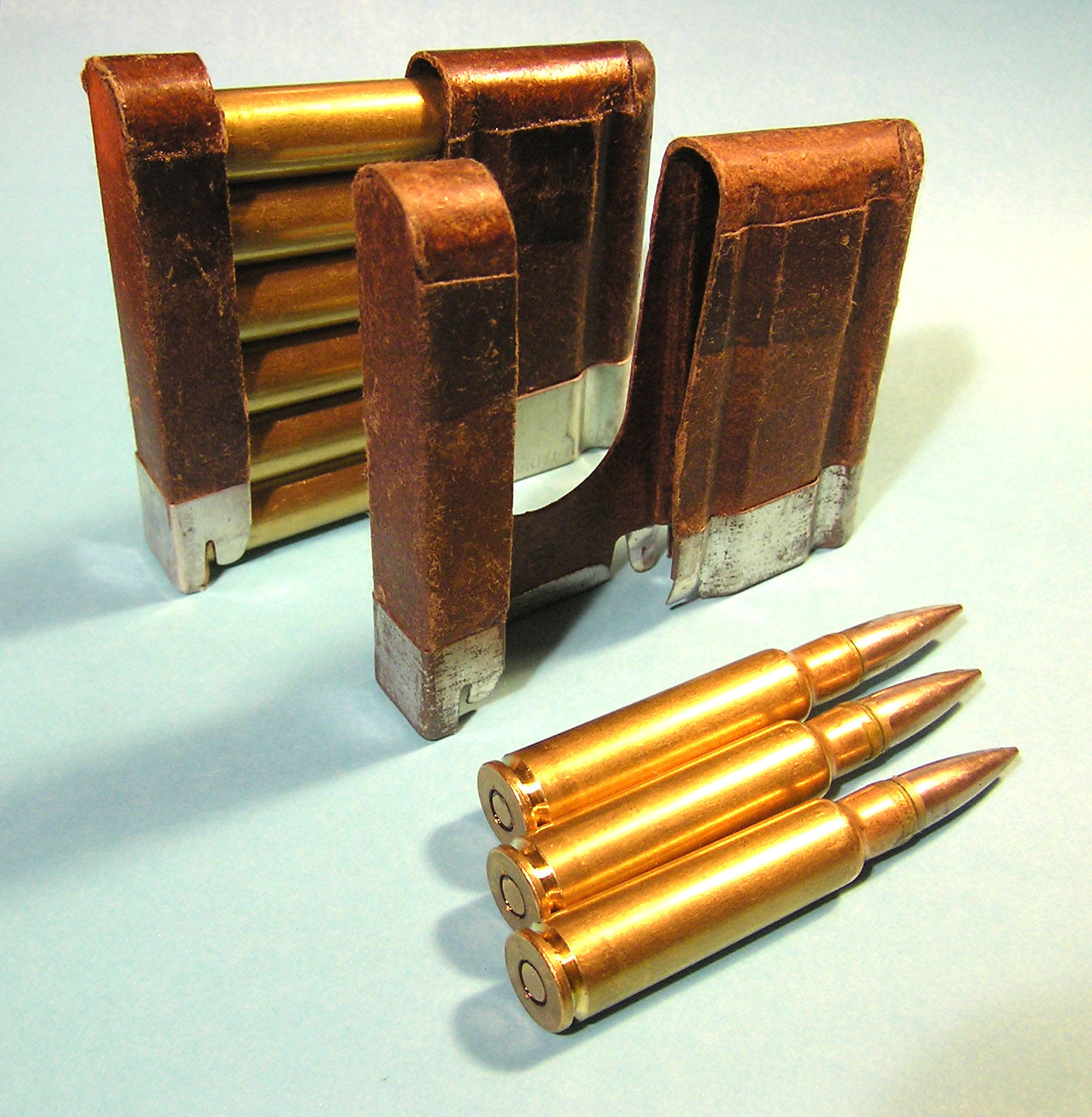
Kar. 31 Phenolic stripper clips with GP11 ball cartridges.

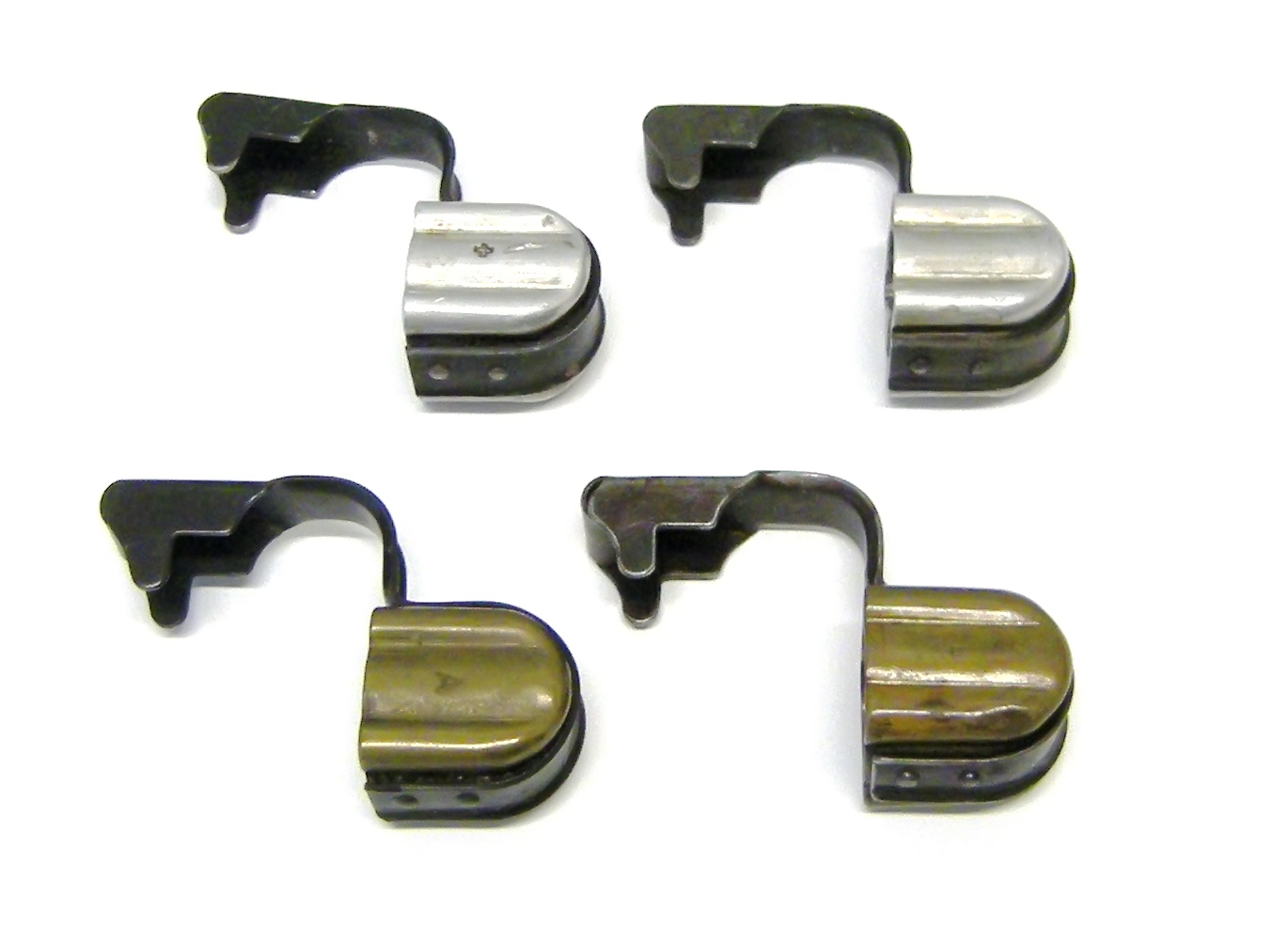
Kar. 31 and Kar. 11 muzzle caps for protecting the muzzle.

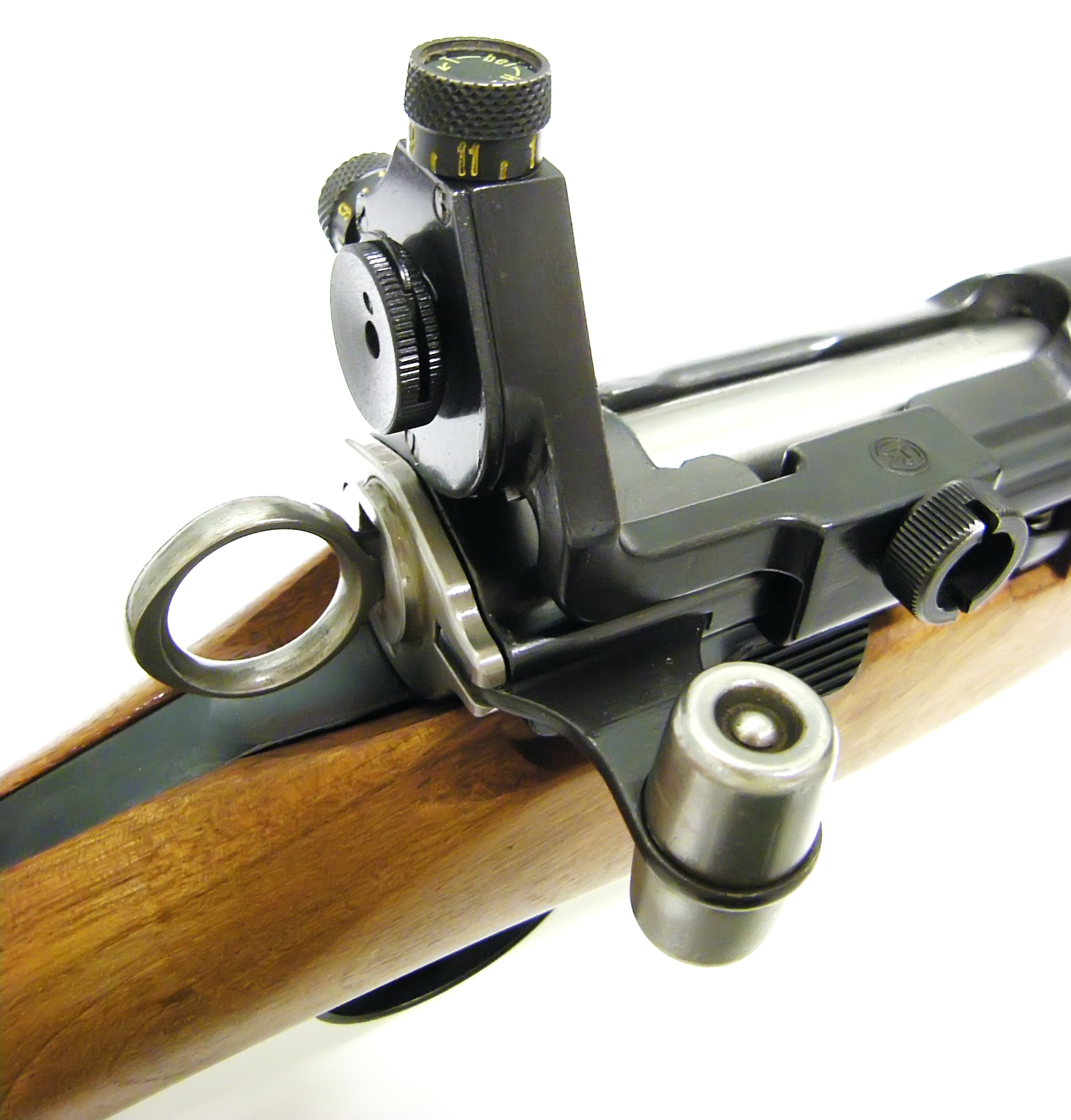
Kar. 31 with W+F diopter rear sight for match shooting.

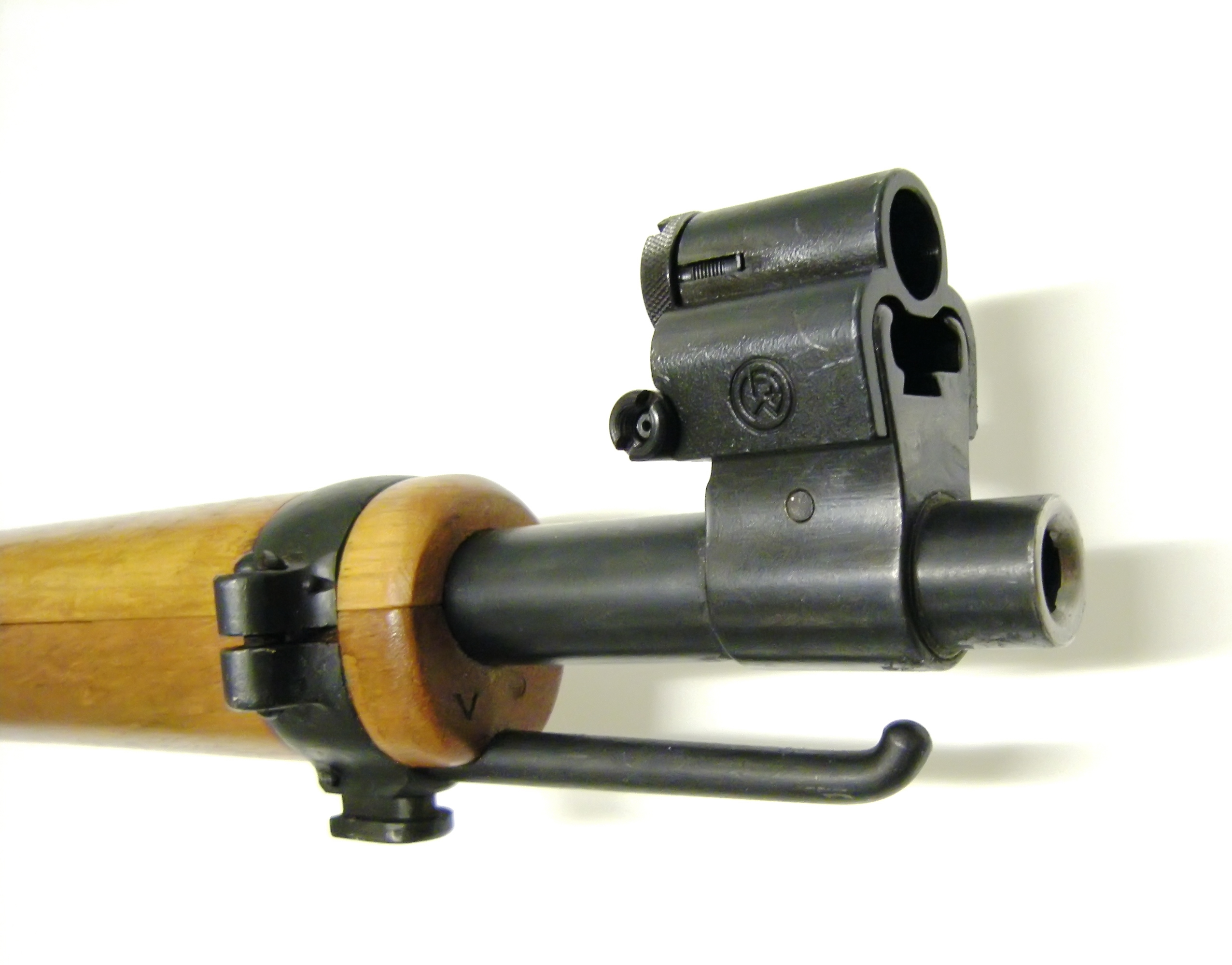
Kar. 31 with W+F globe front sight for match shooting.

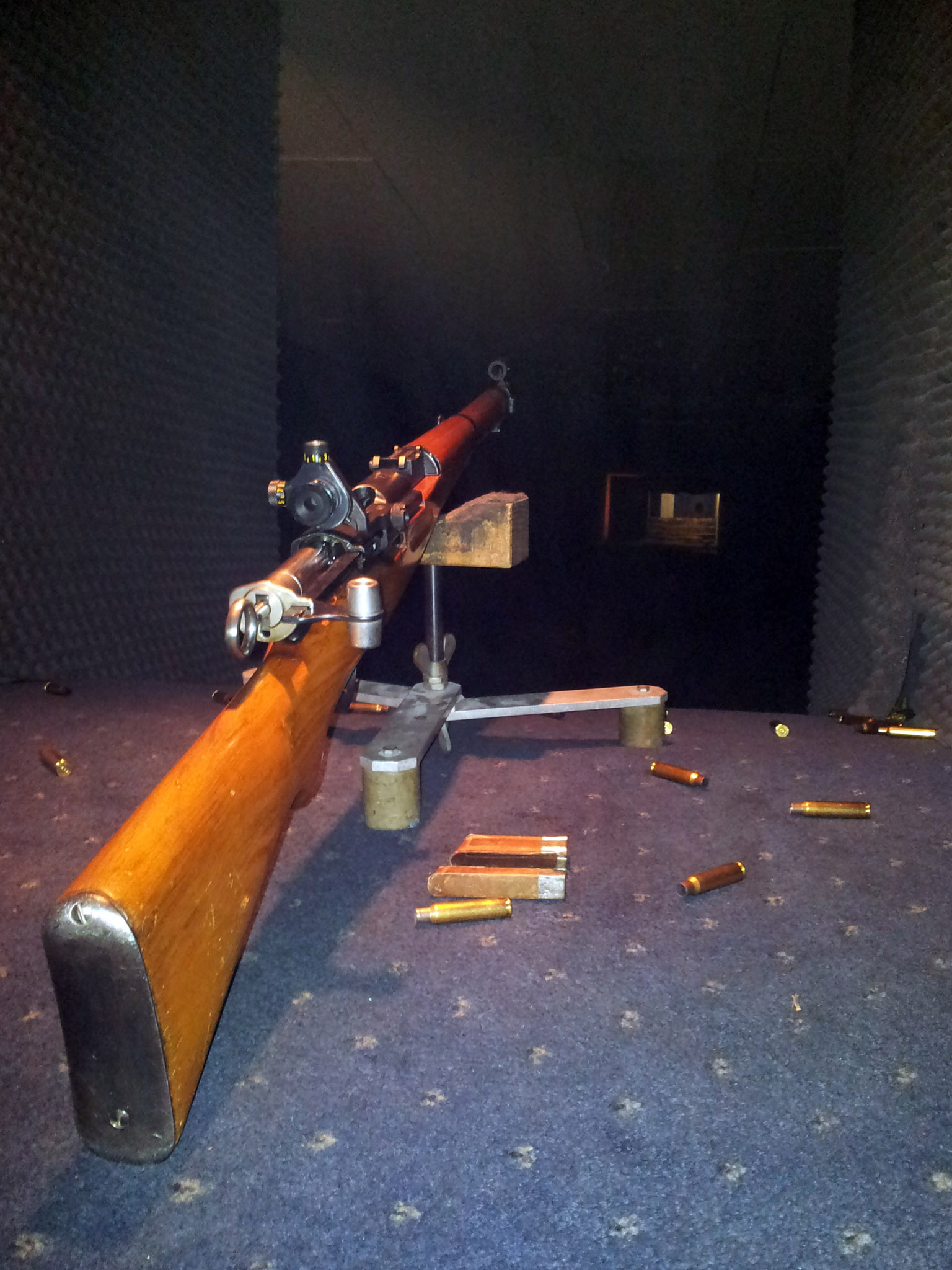
Kar. 31 with W+F match shooting sight line.

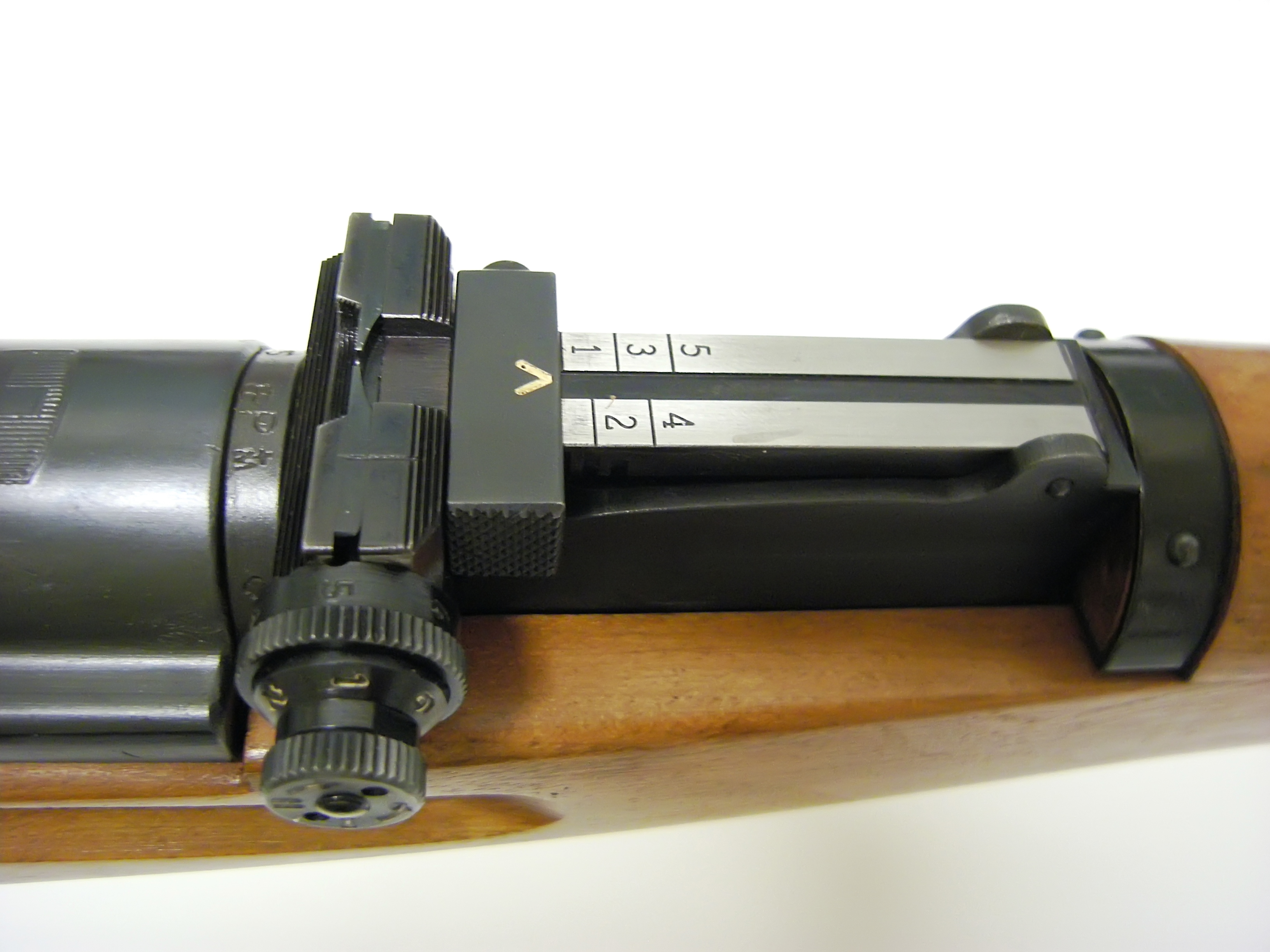
Kar. 31 tangent rear sight element with windage and elevation fine-correctors made by Furter.

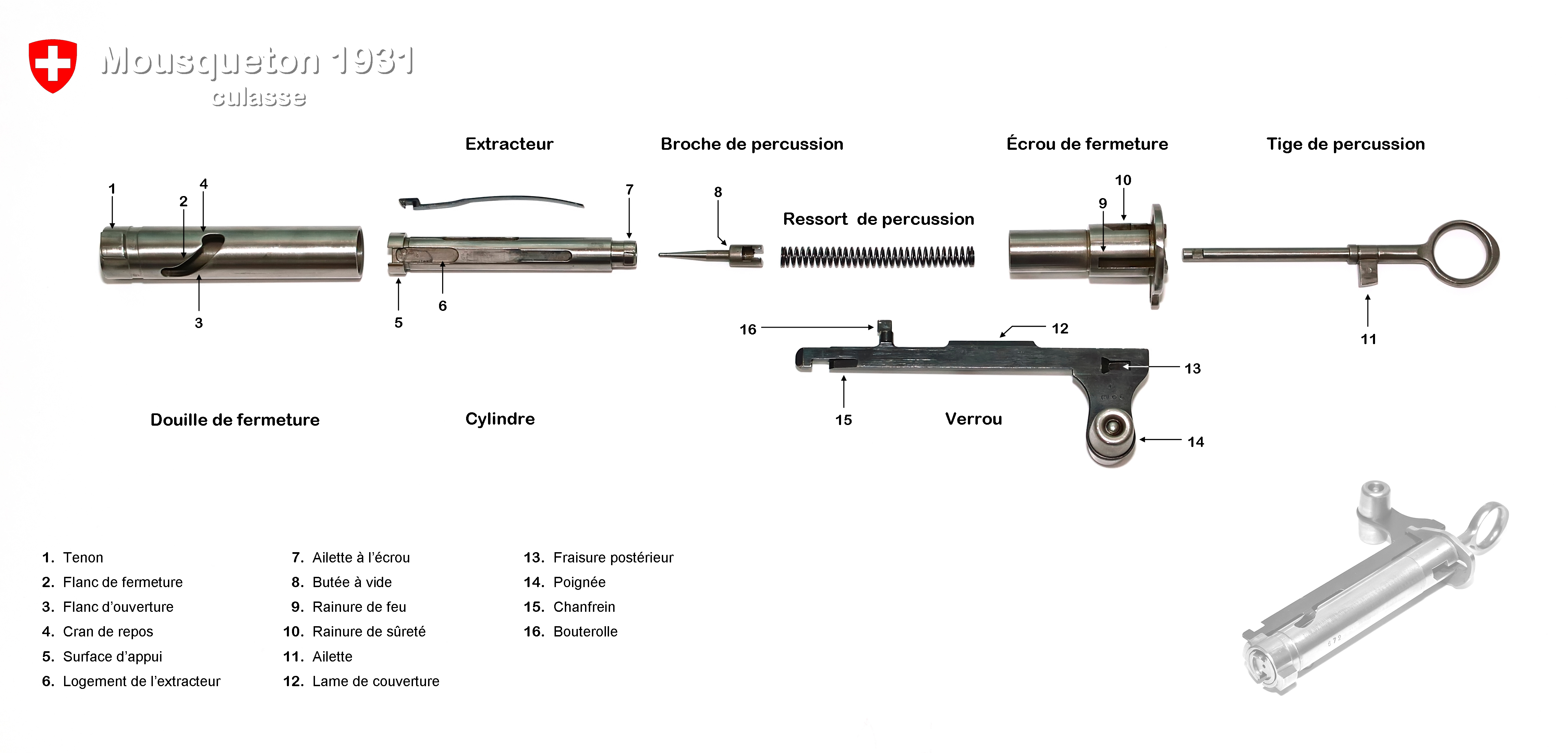
Kar. 31 disassembled bolt assembly.

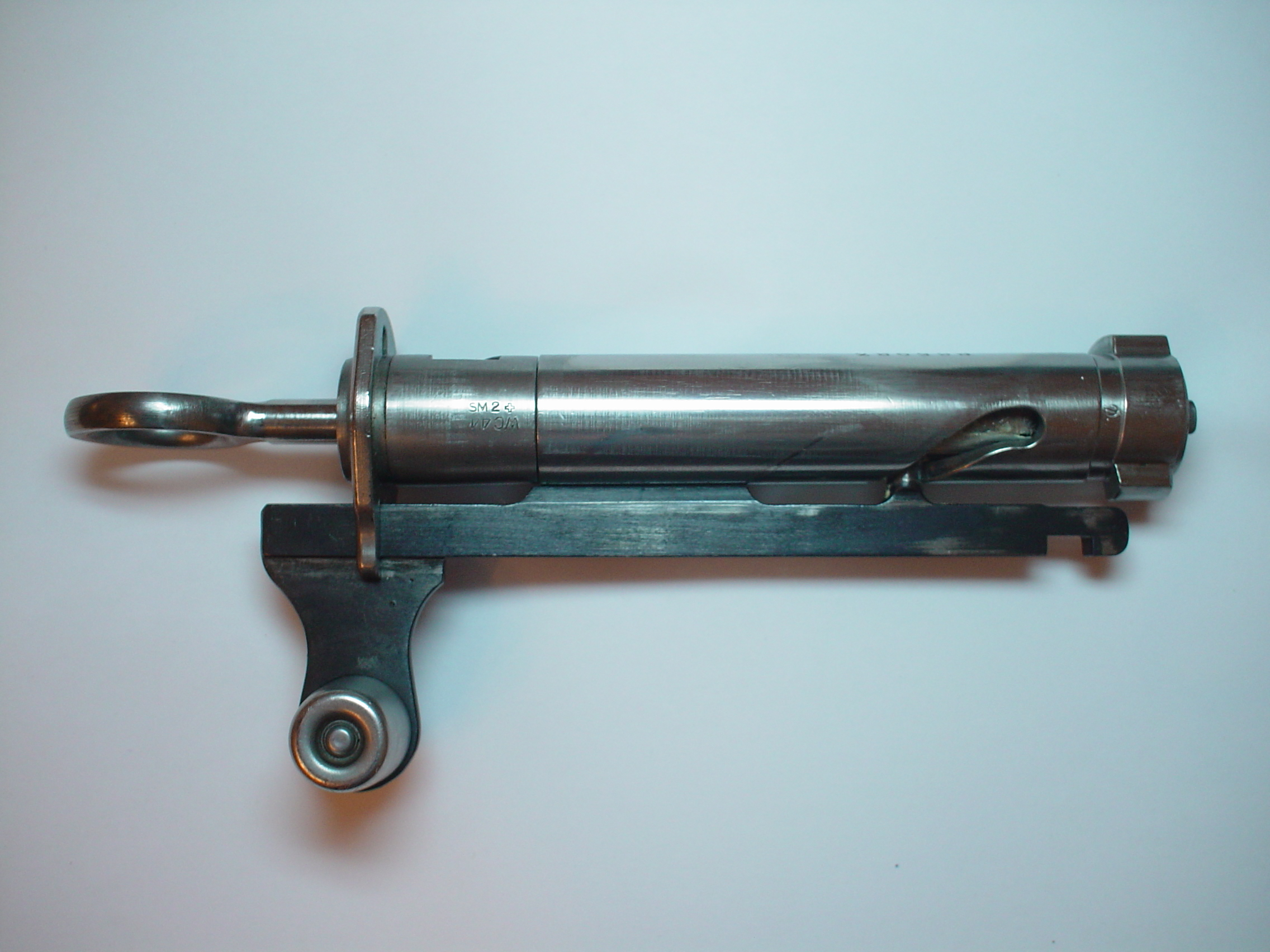
Single Kar. 31 bolt

== Media ==
- A video of the Kar. 31 straight pull bolt in action: Media:K. 31/Kar. 31.ogg
- In the film Shining Through, a Swiss border guard, with his Kar. 31, shot a German sniper firing at Ed and Linda as they were crossing over the Swiss border.
- The sniper variant of the K31, the K31/43 appears in the first-person shooter Battlefield V which is part of the Summer Update.
- The K31 is featured in Call Of Duty: Black Ops Cold War as a DLC weapon called the Swiss K31 which is part of the Season 3 battle pass.
- In the PC horror game Mundaun the player will eventually gain access to an old bolt action rifle that belonged to main character Curdin's deceased grandfather, most likely a K31.
- YouTube personality and firearms enthusiast hickok45 featured the K31 in two videos on his channel: K31 Swiss Rifle Chapter 1 and Chapter 2.

== Users ==
| Country | Organization name | Quantity | Date | Reference |
|---|---|---|---|---|
| Switzerland | Swiss Armed Forces | 528,230 | 1933 to 1958 | |
| Israel | Israeli Defense Force | 200 | 1949 | |
| Vatican City | Pontifical Swiss Guard | 100 | 1955 | |

== See also ==
- Antique gun
- M1895 Lee Navy - An American straight-pull bolt-action rifle
- Ross rifle - A Canadian straight-pull bolt-action rifle
- Steyr-Mannlicher M1895 - An Austrian straight-pull bolt-action rifle
