= Waffenfabrik Bern =

Former arms manufacturer in Switzerland

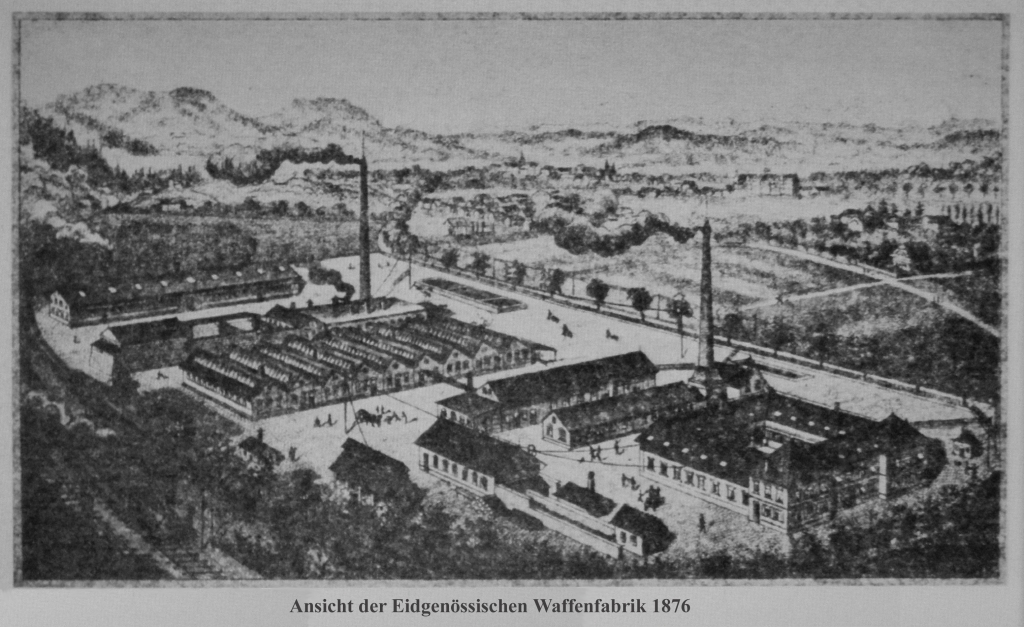
Waffenfabrik Bern, 1876

The Weapons Factory Bern (German: Waffenfabrik Bern, also known as W+F Bern), was an arms manufacturer in Bern, Switzerland, which was a government-owned corporation producing firearms for the Swiss Armed Forces. W+F was integrated into RUAG in 1999, which later discontinued the production of handguns and small arms.

== List of W+F weapons ==
- Vetterli rifle
- Schmidt M1882 - 1882 revolver. Chambered in 7.5 Swiss Ordnance
- Schmidt–Rubin - 1889 straight-pull bolt-action rifle. Chambered in 7.5×53.5 Swiss.
- Swiss Mannlicher M1893 - straight-pull bolt-action rifle designed by Ferdinand Mannlicher. Chambered in 7.5×53.5 Swiss.
- Schmidt–Rubin - 1896 straight-pull bolt-action rifle. Chambered in 7.5×53.5 Swiss.
- Schmidt–Rubin - 1896/11 straight-pull bolt-action rifle. Chambered in 7.5×55 Swiss.
- Schmidt–Rubin - 1911 straight-pull bolt-action rifle. Chambered for the revamped 7.5×53.5 Swiss. The case was lengthened to 55 mm. This new load became the 7.5×55 Swiss. The new load used a modern spitzer bullet and more modern smokeless powders and produces a much higher velocity and pressure than the older 7.5×53.5mm load. 7.5×55mm should never be fired in the 1889 series Schmidt–Rubin.
- Parabellum pistol (Pistole 1920, 06/29)
- MG 11 - machine gun.
- Flieger-Doppelpistole 1919 - double barrel aircraft submachine gun.
- K31 - straight-pull bolt-action rifle. Chambered for 7.5×55mm Swiss.
- Bern Pistole 43 - Semi-automatic pistol intended to replace the Luger 06/29 but ended up being discontinued because of the SIG P210
- Sturmgewehr 52 & Sturmgewehr 54
- MG 51
- W+F Stgw 70 assault rifle. Licence-built AR-15 chambered in 5.6x48mm Eiger.
- W+F Stgw 71 assault rifle. Licence-built Stoner 63 chambered in 5.6x48mm Eiger
- C42 assault rifle. Chambered in 6.45×48mm XPL Swiss

== Notable people ==
- Adolf Furrer - small arms designer and Colonel in Swiss Army. He was the director of W+F Bern from 1921 and resigned after World War II.

== Bibliography ==
- Fusils & carabines de collection. F. Pellaton, R. Caranta, H. Bonsignori, J. Jordanoglou. Édition Crepin-Leblond 1979
- Die Repetiergewehre der Schweiz (1991)
