= List of battle rifles =

Battle rifles are full-sized rifles either in semi-automatic only or select fire configurations and are chambered for full-powered cartridges. The difference between a battle rifle and a designated marksman rifle is often only one of terminology with modifications to the trigger and accuracy enhancements; many of the battle rifles on the list are currently still in use and have been repurposed as designated marksman rifles.

For intermediate-powered rifle cartridge firearms (e.g.: 5.45×39mm, 5.56×45mm, 5.8×42mm, and 7.62×39mm) see List of assault rifles.

Below is the list of automatic rifles and battle rifles.

Name	Manufacturer	Image	Cartridge	firing modes	Country	Year
AK-308	Kalashnikov Concern		7.62×51mm NATO	Select fire	Russia	2018
AOR M21	AOR		7.62×51mm NATO		Greece	2020
ArmaLite AR-10	ArmaLite; Artillerie-Inrichtingen; Colt's Manufacturing Company		7.62×51mm NATO.308 Winchester	Select fire	United States	1956
Automatgevær 3	Kongsberg Gruppen		7.62×51mm NATO	Select fire	Norway	1961
Automatkarbin 4	Husqvarna Vapenfabrik		7.62×51mm NATO	Select fire	Sweden	1966
AVS-36			7.62×54mmR	Select fire	Soviet Union	1936
AVT-40			7.62×54mmR	Select fire	Soviet Union	1942
Beretta BM59	Beretta		7.62×51mm NATO	Select fire	Italy	1959
Brügger & Thomet APC308	B&T		7.62×51mm NATO	Select fire	Switzerland	2018
Calzada Bayo CB-57			7.62×51mm NATO; 7.92×33mm Kurz; 7.92×40mm		Francoist Spain	1957
Cei-Rigotti			6.5×52mm Carcano; 7.65×53mm Mauser	Select fire	Kingdom of Italy	1890s
CETME rifle	CETME		7.62×51mm NATO; 7.62x51mm CETME; 7.92x41mm CETME	Select fire	Francoist Spain	1954
Colt Modular 901	Colt Defense		7.62×51mm NATO	Select fire	United States	2013
CZ BREN 2 BR	Česká zbrojovka Uherský Brod		7.62×51mm NATO	Select fire	Czech Republic	2015
Desert Tech WLVRN	Desert Tech		7.62×51mm NATO	semi-automatic	United States	2024
FA-MAS Type 62	Manufacture d'armes de Saint-Étienne		7.62×51mm NATO	Select fire	France	1962
Fedorov Avtomat	Degtyarev plant		6.5×50mmSR Arisaka	Select fire	Russian Empire	1915
Fallschirmjager 42	Rheinmetall		7.92×57mm Mauser	Select fire	Nazi Germany	1941
FM57 rifle	N/A		7.62×51mm NATO	?	Sweden	1957
FN-49	FN Herstal		.30-06 Springfield	Select fire	Belgium	1947
FN FAL	FN Herstal; IMBEL; Fabricaciones Militares		7.62×51mm NATO	Select fire	Belgium	1947
FN SCAR-H	FN Herstal		7.62×51mm NATO	Select fire	Belgium; United States	2009
Gewehr 41	Berlin-Lübecker Maschinenfabrik		7.92×57mm Mauser	Semi-automatic	Germany	1941
Gewehr 43	Berlin-Lübecker Maschinenfabrik		7.92×57mm Mauser	Semi-automatic	Germany	1943
GRAM 63 battle rifle	Bofors Carl Gustaf		7.62×51mm NATO	Select fire	Sweden	1963
G1			7.62×51mm NATO	Select fire	West Germany	1957-1958
Heckler & Koch G3	Heckler & Koch; MKEK		7.62×51mm NATO	Select fire	West Germany	1956
Heckler & Koch HK417	Heckler & Koch		7.62×51mm NATO	Select fire	Germany	2005
Howa Type 64	Howa		7.62×51mm NATO	Select fire	Japan	1964
Ishapore 1A1	Ordnance Factory Tiruchirappalli		7.62×51mm NATO	Select fire	India	1960
Kbsp wz. 38M	Fabryka Broni		7.92×57mm Mauser	Semi-automatic	Poland	1938
KAL1 general purpose infantry rifle	Lithgow Arms		7.62×51mm NATO		Australia	1970
L1A1 Self-Loading Rifle	Royal Small Arms Factory		7.62×51mm NATO	Select fire	UK	1952
M1 Garand	Springfield Armory		.30-06 Springfield	Semi-automatic	United States	1933
M14 rifle	Springfield Armory		7.62×51mm NATO	Select fire	United States	1954
MPT-76	MKEK		7.62×51mm NATO	Select fire	Turkey	2014
Madsen LAR	Dansk Industri Syndikat		7.62×51mm NATO	Select fire	Denmark	1959
MAS-49	Manufacture d'armes de Saint-Étienne		7.5×54mm French	Semi-automatic	France	1949
Mk 14 Enhanced Battle Rifle	Naval Surface Warfare Center Crane Division		7.62×51mm NATO	Select fire (Military variant); Semi automatic (civilian variant)	United States	2001
Model 45A	N/A		.30-06 Springfield	Select fire	United States; Commonwealth of the Philippines	1945
Pindad SS3	PT Pindad (Persero)		7.62×51mm NATO	Select fire	Indonesia	2014
Pindad SS79	PT Pindad (Persero)		7.62×51mm NATO	Select fire	Indonesia	1979
PVAR rifle	United Defense Manufacturing Corporation		7.62×51mm NATO		Philippines	2009
Sako M23	SAKO		7.62×51mm NATO		Finland	2022–present
Sieg automatic rifle			.30-06 Springfield		United States	1946
SIG AK53	SIG Sauer		7.5×55mm Swiss	Select fire	Switzerland	1953
SIG MCX-SPEAR	SIG Sauer		7.62×51mm NATO; 6.5mm Creedmoor.277 Fury	Select fire	United States	2019
SIG SG 510	Schweizerische Industrie Gesellschaft		7.5×55mm Swiss; 7.62×51mm NATO	Select fire	Switzerland	1956
SIG SG 542	Schweizerische Industrie Gesellschaft		7.62×51mm NATO	Select fire	Switzerland	1977
SIG 716	SIG Sauer		7.62×51mm 6.5mm Creedmoor	Select fire	United States	2010
SIG SG 751 SAPR	Swiss Arms AG		7.62×51mm	Select fire	Switzerland	2004
SLEM-1	FN Herstal		7.92×57mm Mauser	Semi-automatic	Belgium	1944
Stg-54	W+F Bern		7.5×55mm Swiss	Select fire	Switzerland	1950s
SVT-40	Tula Arms Plant; Izhevsk Machinebuilding Plant		7.62×54mmR	Semi-automatic	Soviet Union	1938
Sturmgewehr 58	Fabrique Nationale de Herstal and Steyr-Daimler-Puch		7.62×51mm NATO	Select fire	Belgium; Austria	1956
T48 rifle	FN Herstal; H&R Firearms; High Standard Manufacturing Company		7.62×51mm NATO	Select fire	Belgium; United States	1947
Ugram	Armament Research and Development Establishment		7.62×51mm NATO	Select fire	India	2022
Zastava M77 B1	Zastava Arms		7.62×51mm NATO	Select fire	Yugoslavia	1977
ZH-29	Ceskoslovenska Zbrojovka		7.92×57mm Mauser	Semi-automatic	Czechoslovakia	1929

== See also ==
- List of weapons
- List of firearms
- List of rifles
- List of machine guns
- List of submachine guns
- List of assault rifles
- List of bolt-action rifles
- List of straight-pull rifles
- List of pump-action rifles
- List of semi-automatic rifles
- List of carbines
- List of multiple-barrel firearms
- List of pistols
- List of revolvers
- List of semi-automatic pistols
- List of sniper rifles
- List of shotguns
