= Madsen LAR =

- Madsen Light Automatic Rifle M-62
- Type: Battle rifle/Assault rifle (Proposed Finnish service variant)
- Place of origin: Denmark

Production history
- Designed: 1957-1962
- Manufacturer: Dansk Industri Syndikat
- Variants: Full wooden stock, Fixed tube stock, Side-folding stock, Underfolding stock

Specifications
- Cartridge: 7.62×51mm NATO, 7.62×39mm M43 (Proposed Finnish service variant)
- Caliber: 7.62mm
- Action: Gas-operated
- Feed system: 20-round detachable box magazine, 30-round AK magazine (Proposed Finnish service variant)
- Sights: Iron sights

The Madsen LAR was a battle rifle of Danish origin chambered in the 7.62×51mm NATO caliber. It is based on the Kalashnikov rifle and was made from lightweight, high tensile alloys and steel similar to that used on the M16 rifle. Its layout is similar to a number of rifles at the time, such as the GRAM 63 and the Valmet M62. Development of the Madsen LAR can be traced back to 1957 when various arms manufacturers such as FN Herstal and Heckler & Koch were producing the FN FAL and the Heckler & Koch G3, respectively.

== Variants ==
Variants of the LAR came with solid wood stocks that covered the receiver from the handguard to the buttplate, then with a fixed steel tube and side/underfolding stocks. The earlier assault rifle variant (chambered for the 7.62×39mm M43 round but incompatible with AK magazines) was intended for the armed forces of Finland and to draw them away from using a Soviet-based design, the Valmet M62. However, Finland, being a neutral country, ignored this and went ahead with the Valmet M62, adopting it as their standard service rifle due to its cheaper cost for production and potentially better reliability.

== See also ==
- List of battle rifles
