= FM57 rifle =

FM57
- Type: Battle rifle
- Place of origin: Sweden

Specifications
- Mass: 4.60 kg
- Cartridge: 7.62×51mm NATO
- Caliber: 7.62mm
- Action: Gas-operated
- Feed system: 20-round detachable box magazine
- Sights: Iron sights

The FM1957 is a Swedish prototype battle rifle based on the Ag m/42 semi-automatic rifle. Along with the FN FAL, M14 rifle, Rk 60 and GRAM 63 battle rifle, it was in competition to replace the bolt action Mausers and the Ag m/42B rifles in Swedish service during the early 1960s but lost over the Heckler & Koch G3 (license built as the Ak 4 in Sweden). The FM57 therefore never entered serial production. The rifle was built in two calibers: the 6.5×55mm (standard in the Swedish Armed Forces at the time) and the 7.62×51mm NATO (which later replaced the 6.5 mm cartridge in Swedish service).

== See also ==
- List of battle rifles
- GRAM 63 battle rifle
