= SIG SG 510 =

Swiss battle rifle

7.5mm Stgw. 57 / F. ass. 57 7.5mm
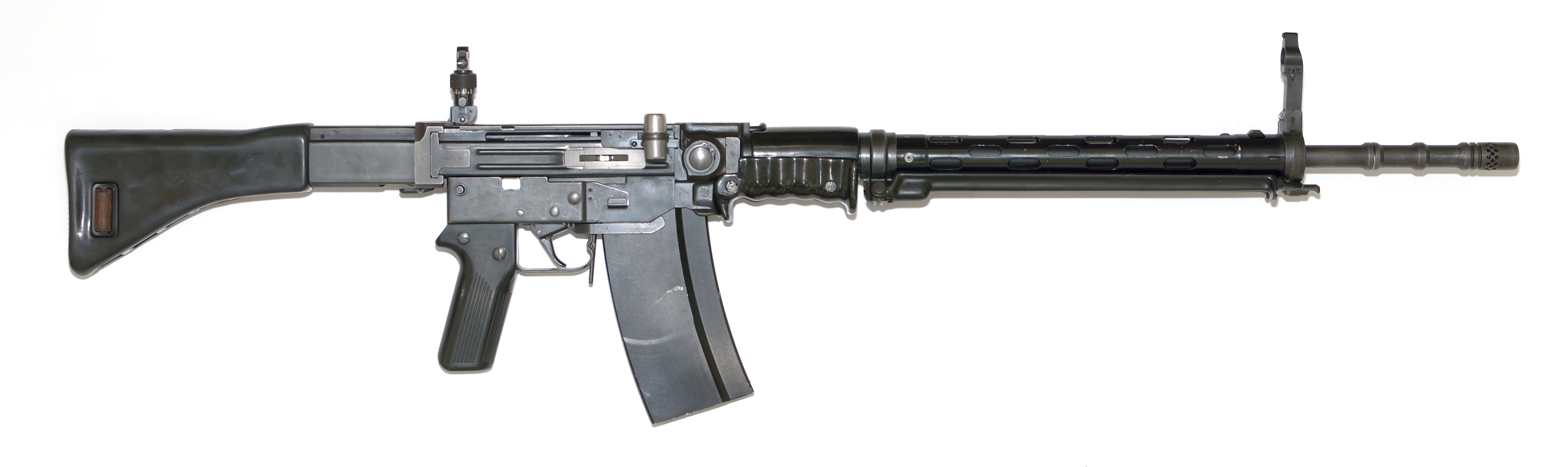
- Sturmgewehr 57 (Stgw. 57)
- Type: Battle rifle
- Place of origin: Switzerland

Service history
- In service: 1957–present
- Used by: See Users
- Wars: The Troubles; For the SG 510-4: 1973 Chilean coup d'état; Armed conflict for control of the favelas

Production history
- Designer: Rudolf Amsler
- Designed: 1950s
- Manufacturer: Schweizerische Industrie Gesellschaft (SIG); Waffenfabrik Bern; Swiss subcontractors
- Produced: 1957–1985
- Variants: SG 510-1, SG 510-2, SG 510-3, SG 510-4, SG 510-5, SG 510-6, SG 510-7 T (SIG-AMT), PE-Stgw. 57

Specifications
- Mass: 5.70 kg (12.57 lb) (Stgw. 57); 4.37 kg (9.63 lb) (SG 510-4)
- Length: 1,100 mm (43.3 in) (Stgw. 57); 1,015 mm (40.0 in) (SG 510-4)
- Barrel length: 609 mm (24.0 in) (Stgw. 57); 505 mm (19.9 in) (SG 510-4)
- Cartridge: 7.5×55mm GP 11 (Stgw. 57); 7.62×51mm NATO (SG 510-4)
- Action: Roller-delayed blowback using stepped & fluted chamber
- Rate of fire: 450–600 rounds/min
- Muzzle velocity: 750 m/s (2,460 ft/s)
- Effective firing range: 640 m (700 yd) iron sights 800 m (875 yd) Kern 4×24 optical sight
- Feed system: 6-, 20-, or 24-round detachable box magazine
- Sights: Front post, rear aperture

The Sturmgewehr 57 (Stgw. 57, lit. 'assault rifle 57'), is a selective fire battle rifle designed by Schweizerische Industrie Gesellschaft (now SAN Swiss Arms) of Switzerland. The Stgw. 57 assault rifle uses a roller-delayed blowback system similar to the blowback system of the Heckler & Koch G3 (H&K G3) and CETME rifles. As an assault rifle, the model AM 55 entered service in the Swiss Army in three designations F. ass. 57 7.5mm (Fr: Fusil d’Assaut; Ital: Fucile d’Assalto 1957) and 7.5mm Stgw. 57 (Ger: Sturmgewehr 1957). Technologically, the Stgw. 57 was the mechanical and design basis for the export-variations of the SG 510 family of small arms. After thirty-three years, from 1957 to 1990, the Swiss Army replaced the Stgw. 57 with the SIG SG 550, a lighter-weight assault rifle.

== Development ==
The Stgw. 57 assault rifle was developed during the late 1950s, with the in-house model name of AM 55, at SIG Combibloc Group (SIG). During development, Rudolf Amsler was the principal designer at Schweizerische Industrie Gesellschaft. Mechanically, the Stgw. 57 is a selective fire rifle that employs a roller-delayed blowback operating system. In military service, the Swiss Army issued the Stgw. 57 as the personal weapon of every soldier. In the course of service, the Stgw. 57 replaced the following four weapons: (i) the K31 rifle, (ii) the Suomi M-31/Mp. 43/Mp. 44 submachine gun, (iii) the Lmg 25 light machinegun, and (iv) in the 1974–1977 period, replaced the Zf. Kar. 55 sniper's rifle.

== Design details ==
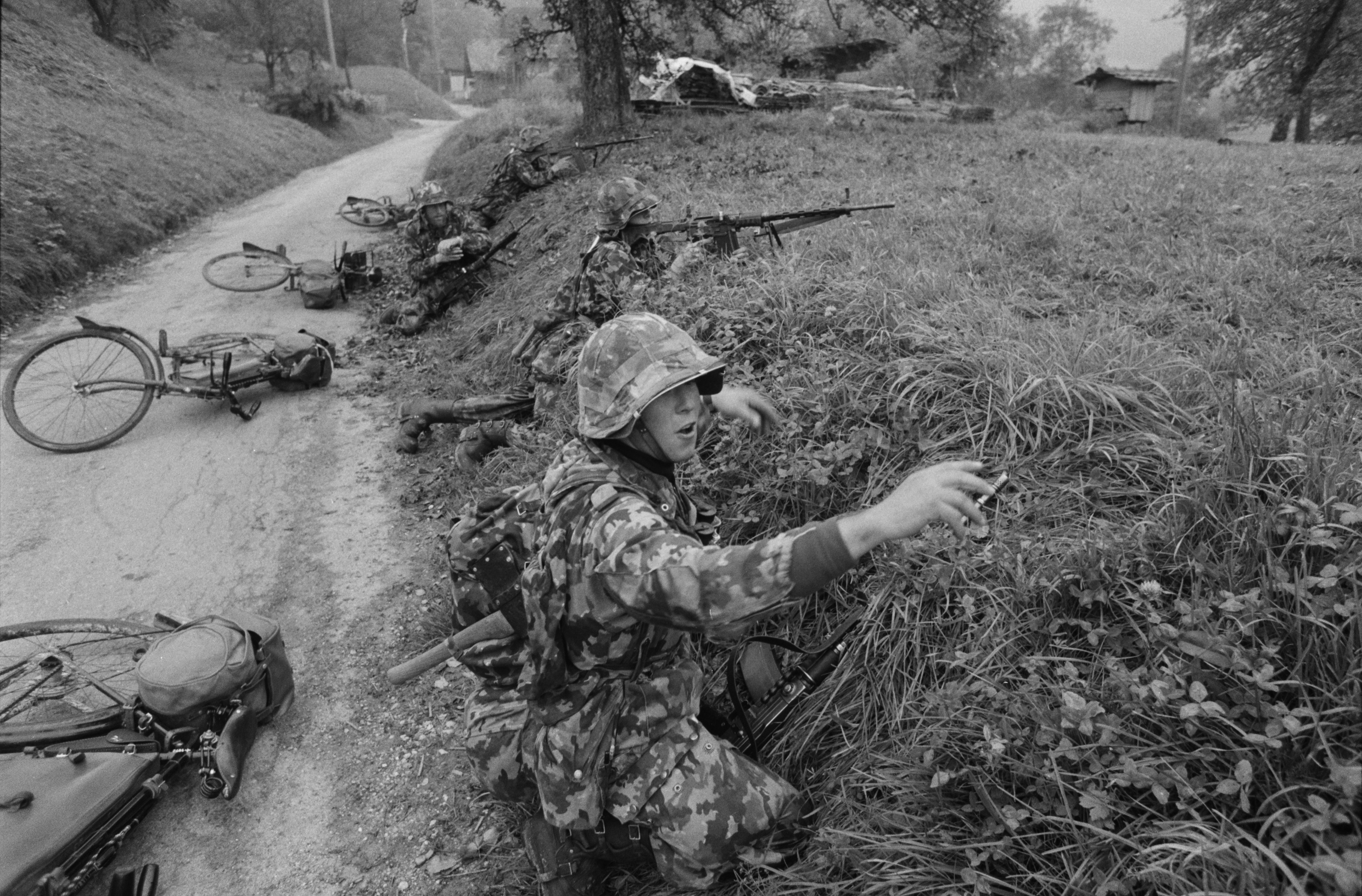
Swiss bicycle infantry armed with the Stgw 57 in 1975.

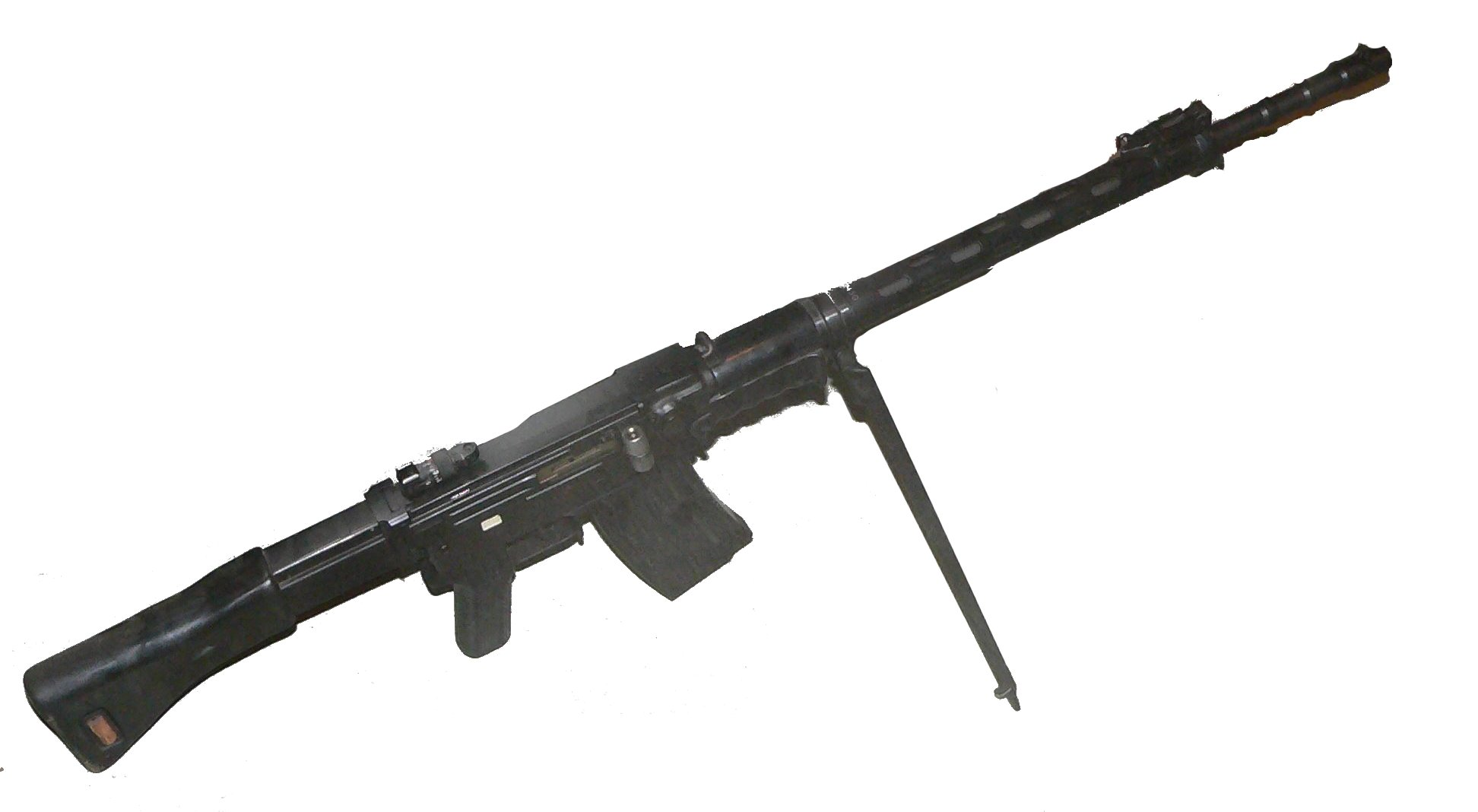
Stgw 57 with folded down iron sights on its bipod set in the rear position.

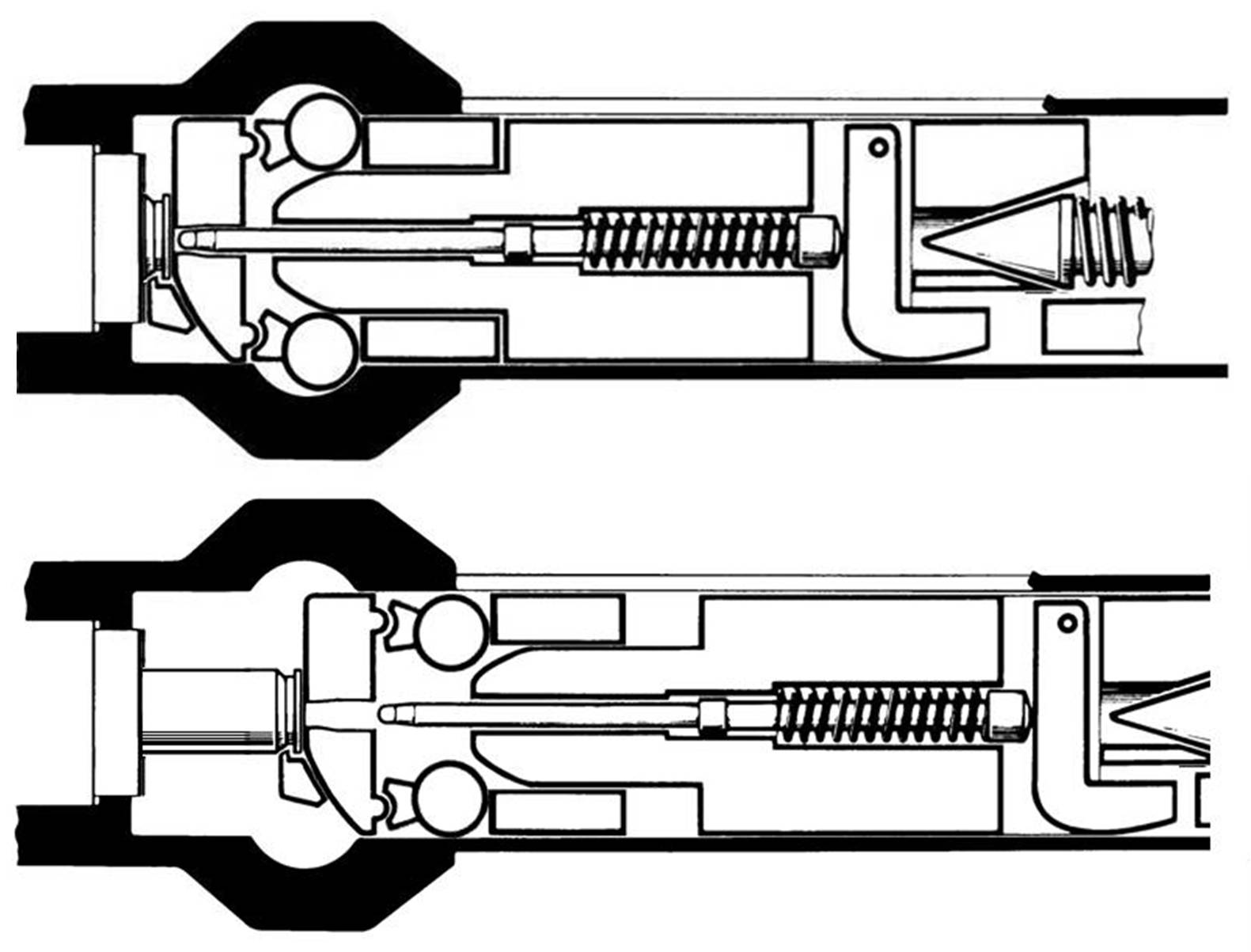
Stgw. 57 roller-delayed locking system

The weapon is mainly made of pressed sheet-metal components to ease mass production and incorporates the "straight-line" recoil configuration. This layout, placed both the center of gravity and the position of the shoulder stock nearly in line with the longitudinal axis of the bore, a feature reducing barrel climb increasing controllability during burst or automatic fire. The Stgw. 57 has a distinctive T-shaped bolt handle similar to the earlier K31 rifle.

As with all roller-delayed designs, the roller recesses and rollers in the receiver will eventually wear down, decreasing the bolt head to bolt carrier gap. Many roller-delayed blowback weapons accept this as the functional service life of the rifle, but the Stgw. 57 has interchangeable locking recesses, so they can be replaced when worn.

The solid neoprene rubber, fixed butt-stock was designed with durability in mind and dynamically deforms to cope with the recoil produced by heavy rifle grenades. The Stgw. 57 sports a large carrying handle at its balance point that can be used during quick position changes or on the march. The ribbed handguard of the Stgw. 57 is also molded out of solid neoprene rubber.

=== Stepped & fluted chamber ===
The fluted chamber on the Stgw. 57 is unusual as it uses a stepped case expansion ring in conjunction that allows the brass to obturate into the fluting that delays the extraction resulting in a very soft cycling operation. The stepped & fluted chamber of the Stgw. 57 is very different than fluted chambers found on other delayed-blowback firearms. The Stgw. 57 has 4 sets of 2 flutes that extend past the leade into the rifling (the bulging ring at the shoulder of the case). This slight bulge slows the round down during feeding and helps to reduce bolt bounce during full auto fire.

=== Barrel ===
The Stgw. 57's barrel is relatively thick and rifled along 520 mm (20.5 in) of its 609 mm (24.0 in) length and has a 270 mm (1 in 10.6 in) 4 groove rifling. At the end of the barrel an integral 26 mm (1.0 in) long muzzle brake/flash hider is fitted that reduces recoil by about 25%. A rifle grenade-launching interface is also integrally machined into the body of the barrel.

The barrel is surrounded by a perforated tubular aluminium barrel jacket with two spring detents for a sliding, underfolding integrated bipod—one near the muzzle to reduce shot dispersion during automatic fire, and another nearer the receiver and balance point offering more flexibility in the rifle role. The Stgw. 57 bipod legs are marked for use as an inclinometer for aiming rifle grenades at various ranges with and without an additional booster-charged rifle grenade. For such indirect rifle grenade fire, the Stgw. 57 was set on the ground and a weighted string attached on the sling loop was used as a plumb-line to set the correct firing angle reference mark on the appropriate bipod leg (left for boosted, right for unboosted). Swiss army knives were used as a makeshift plumb bob at the end of a string.

=== Trigger mechanism ===
The trigger mechanism has a three-position fire selector switch that is also the manual safety toggle that secures the weapon from accidentally discharging. The user selects the operating mode with a large side lever on the left side of the trigger pack that can be rotated to select S (safe), E (semi-automatic fire) or M (full-automatic fire).

On the right hand side of the rifle, there is a foldaway 'winter' trigger which enables the operator to use the rifle with arctic mittens. It is also used for rifle grenade firing to avoid recoil-induced hand injuries.

=== Sights ===
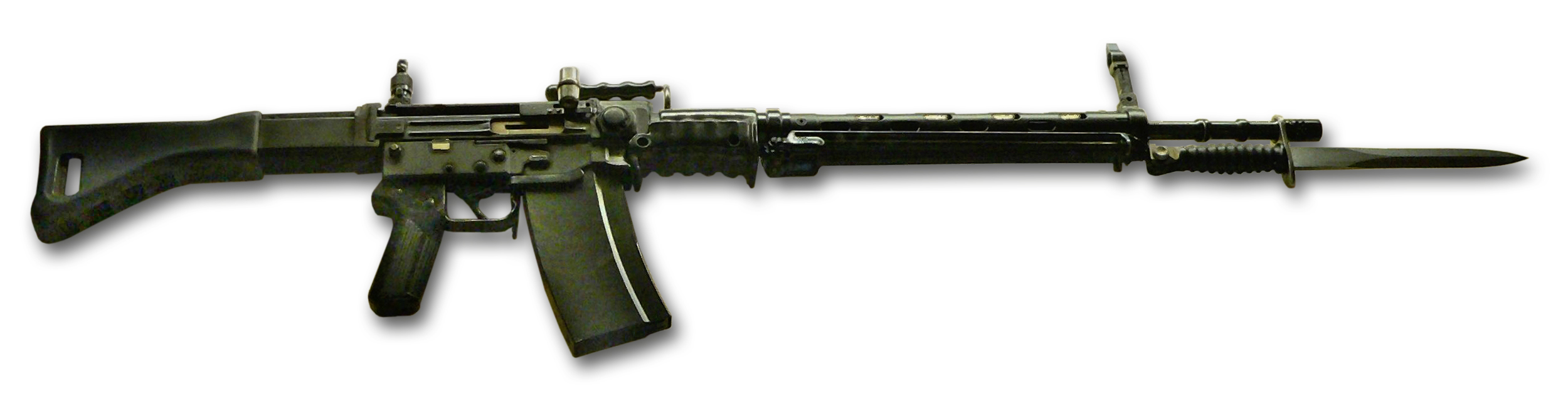
Swiss Army Stgw 57 with erected iron sights and mounted bayonet

The Stgw. 57 has a straight-line stock design, and an elevated iron sights line with a relatively long 635 mm (25.0 in) sight radius. Both the front and rear sights can be folded down when not in use. The rear peep sight of the Stgw. 57 can be adjusted from 100 to 640 m (109 to 700 yd). From 100–200 m (109–219 yd) the sight adjusts in 50 m (55 yd) increments. From 200–300 m (219–328 yd) in 33 m (36 yd) increments, and from 300–640 m (328–700 yd) in 20 m (21.9 yd) increments.

For low-visibility use, a reversible clip-on diopter with two self-luminous tritium-powered inserts (later carbon-14, one-side only) fitted laterally on each side of the aperture was issued. This element could be clipped by the user on the standard diopter. The front sight hood contained a permanently attached single strontium-90 or tritium-powered insert above the post to complete the low visibility sight line. When not in use, the low-light diopter is stored inside the pistol grip cavity, with two blister packets of weapon grease. The useful life expectancy of tritium-illuminated night sight inserts is roughly 7-10 years.

According to the Swiss Army, the 50% windage and elevation dispersion shot at 300 m from a machine rest averages 6 cm (2.4 in). The employed circular error probable method cannot be converted and is not comparable to US military methods for determining rifle accuracy. When the R_{50} results are doubled the hit probability increases to 93.7%. For anti-personnel use, the Stgw. 57 typical maximum range for consistent accuracy is 800 m (875 yd).

For designated marksman use, some special variants of the Stgw. 57 can be equipped with a quick-detachable Kern & Co Aarau 4×24 telescopic sight. The sight weighs 730 g (26 oz) and includes a variety of features, such as a Bullet Drop Compensation (BDC) elevation adjustment knob for ranges from 100 to 800 m, a tritium-illuminated reticle that enables target acquisition in low-light conditions and a diopter eyesight correction adjustment. Included with the sight is a lens hood with additional protective lens and a gray filter for glare reduction. A night vision sight with an infrared light can also be mounted. The Chilean version can fit a German-made Supra 4×24 telescopic sight.

=== Accessories ===
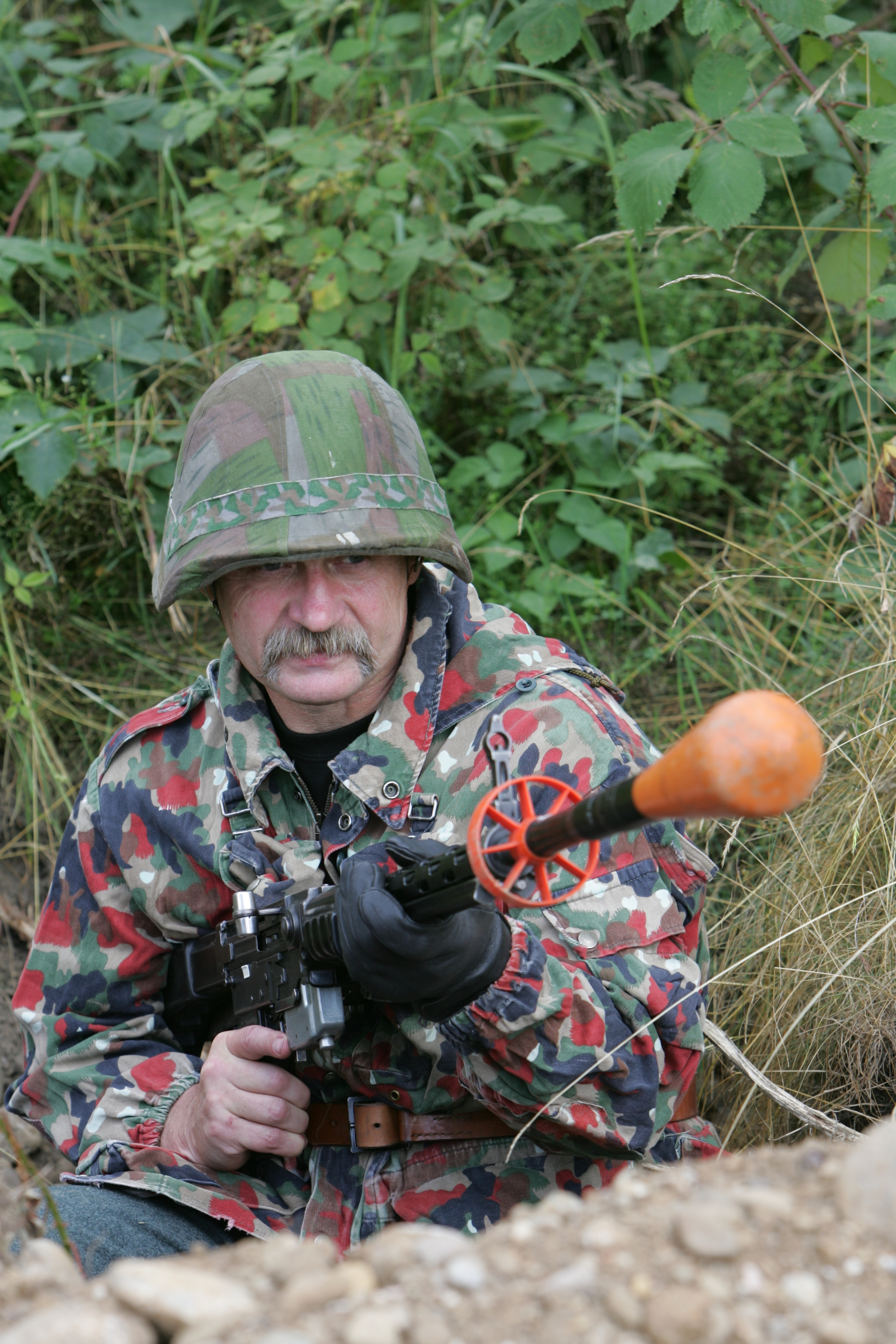
Stgw 57 with mounted practice rifle grenade without booster charge (Gw. UG 58 o. Zu-Treibladg)

The Stgw. 57 is fed from curved detachable box magazines, made from aluminum and containing 24 rounds weighing 250 g (8.8 oz) empty and 900 g (31.7 oz) fully loaded. Special silver-colored magazines that can contain 6 grenade-launching cartridges (Gw. Treib.-Pat. 44) for use with rifle grenades weigh 230 g (8.1 oz) empty and 325 g (11.5 oz) fully loaded. The Stgw. PE-57 had 6-round magazines available as well. Magazines with 20-round capacities for the SG 510-4 in 7.62 NATO and 30-round originally for the Lmg. 25 may operate in the Stgw. 57 as well. Other accessories include a leather sling, a bayonet, various magazine pouches, cavalry holsters, and fortress-firing kits.

Rocket-boosted rifle grenades can be launched with the use of the aforementioned silver-colored magazine. Grenade-launching cartridges enable the Stgw. 57 to fire Gewehrgranaten 58 rifle grenades which weigh 1.16 to 1.18 kg (2.56 to 2.60 lb) depending on the warhead type. These rifle grenades achieve a muzzle velocity of 35 m/s (115 ft/s) and a maximum range of 125 m (137 yd) without the help of a booster charge or a V7 of 70 m/s (230 ft/s) and a maximum range of 400 m (437 yd) with the help of a booster charge. Rifle grenade variants include:

- Gw. HPz. G. 58: Hollow charge for heavy armor (direct-fire only), rated for ca. 280-320mm of penetration in rolled homogenous armor.
- Gw. St. G. 58: Anti-personnel fragmentation with impact detonator (direct or indirect-fire).
- Gw. Nb. G. 58: Smoke canister for reducing visibility (direct or indirect-fire).
- Gw. UG 58: Practice (inert orange rubber), with or without booster charge.

== Civilian use ==
Upon completion of their military service, members of the Swiss armed forces could obtain ownership of their personal Stgw. 57 rifle by paying an administrative fee. These "civilianised" Stgw. 57 rifles were converted to a semi-automatic only configuration. Dedicated factory-built, semi-automatic only rifles for private purchase were available and designated PE-Stgw. 57, PE means Privat Einzelfeuer ("private single fire"). These civilian rifles incorporate subtle design changes to avoid some cross-compatibility with army rifle parts. As of 2007, around 40 percent of discharged soldiers choose to retain their weapon (nowadays the SIG SG 550), and the going rate for civilianised Stgw. 57 rifles on the private weapons market is reported to vary between 300 and 500 Swiss francs.

In Switzerland, the Stgw. 57 is also used for target shooting matches. For this the standard iron sights can be replaced by target shooting diopter and globe sight sighting lines. When the original sighting is kept Swiss sport shooters refer to a such unmodified rifle as Stgw. 57/02 (small diopter allowed, but no globe sight). When a globe sight is added and possibly the sighting line radius is lengthened by mounting the globe sight nearer to the muzzle it is referred to as Stgw. 57/03. As of 2017, original military barrels, which are known for longevity and are rated for up to 15,000 rounds (for later nitrided variants), could be replaced by match-grade barrels. Other upgrades include improved target sights, mirage bands, lighter hammers, custom pistol grips, custom barrel jackets and regular replacement of bolt components.

== SG 510-4 (7.62×51mm NATO variant) ==
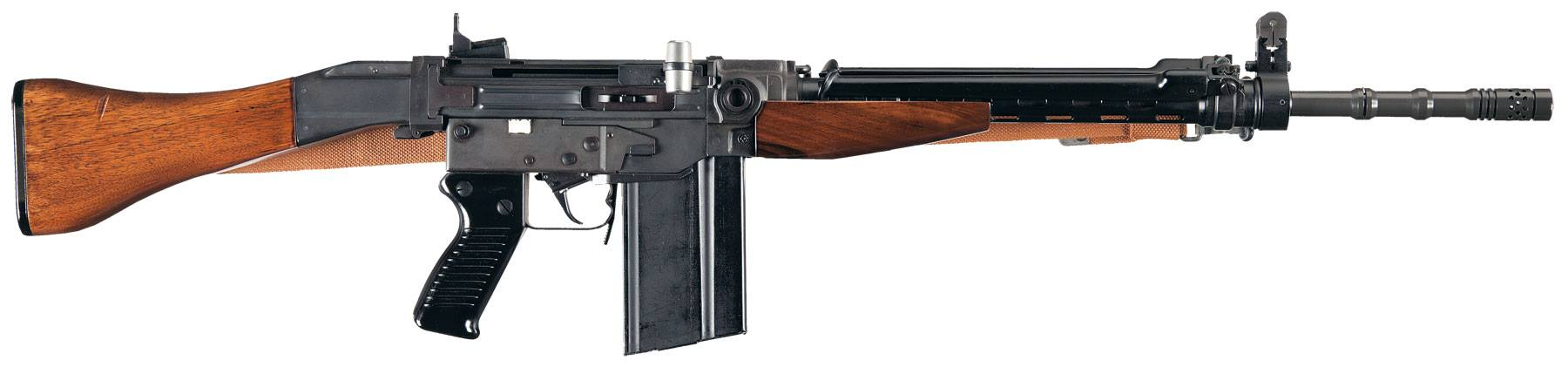
SG 510-4 rifle chambered in 7.62×51mm NATO

The SG 510-4 chambered in 7.62×51mm NATO was adopted by Chile and Bolivia. Compared to the SG 510-1, the following main changes were applied:

- Lighter, shorter (505mm) barrel with 8 (early), or 16 (late) chamber flutes, 304.8mm (1 in 12 inch) twist rate
- Revised delay angle on the bolt carrier wedge
- Straight 20-round box magazine with feed path insert to accommodate for the shorter cartridge
- New low-profile iron sights, with ramp-adjustable rear sight aperture and semi-hooded front sight
- Spring-loaded detent on the front barrel jacket bushing/front sight base for rifle grenade sight
- Angled stock tube and stock assembly, with correspondingly modified recoil spring assembly and bolt carrier tail
- Walnut wood stock and handguard
- New pistol grip design (after ca. 1966)
- Lightened roller recesses and winter trigger
- Simplified bolt carrier with add-on, unified rubber buffer and charging handle lug

The SG 510-4 is officially classed as an automatic rifle but also served as a designated marksman weapon (in Chile with Supra 4×24 scope).

== Variants ==
- AM 55: Original version as adopted by the Swiss Army as "7,5mm Stgw. 57".
- SG 510-1: Export model of the AM 55 chambered in 7.62×51mm NATO.
- SG 510-2: Lightened variant of the SG 510-1.
- SG 510-3: 7.62×39mm variant with shorter barrel, receiver and barrel jacket. This was produced in small numbers as a prototype and submitted to the Finnish Army. This model of the rifle was never mass-produced.
- SG 510-4: 7.62×51mm NATO variant used by Bolivia and Chile. This version uses a shorter barrel and a buttstock made from wood rather than rubber. Overall length is much less than the Stgw 57 with a subsequently lower weight. The buttstock and stock tube are angled downward rather than straight inline with the receiver.
- SG 510-5: .30-06 Springfield (7.62×63mm) experimental rifle made for testing by the Mexican Government.
- SG 510-6: 7.5×55mm Swiss test batch of rifles based on the SG 510-4 in the Swiss military chambering intended to replace the heavier Stgw 57. The rifles were only built for testing and were no longer considered after 1980s trials.
- SG 510-7 T / SIG-AMT: semi-automatic only variant of the SG 510-4 imported into the United States in relatively small numbers. It was available in .308 (7.62×51). "AMT", term used after 1969, stood for "American Match Target". It was equipped with fine wooden furniture and could be ordered with a rounded upper handguard.
- Gewehr 2 (G2): 7.62×51mm NATO variant procured by the Bundeswehr for trials in 1956, which eventually lost to what would become Heckler & Koch G3.
- PE-Stgw. 57: (Privat Einzelfeuer) semi-automatic only civilian version of the AM 55 available in 7.5×55mm GP 11 Swiss. This variant is not the same as privatized former Swiss Army service rifles. It was specifically built as a semi auto only rifle along the lines of the Stgw. 57 with which it is frequently confused. While over 700,000 of the Stgw. 57s were built for military use, less than 5000 PE-Stgw. 57s were made.

== Users ==
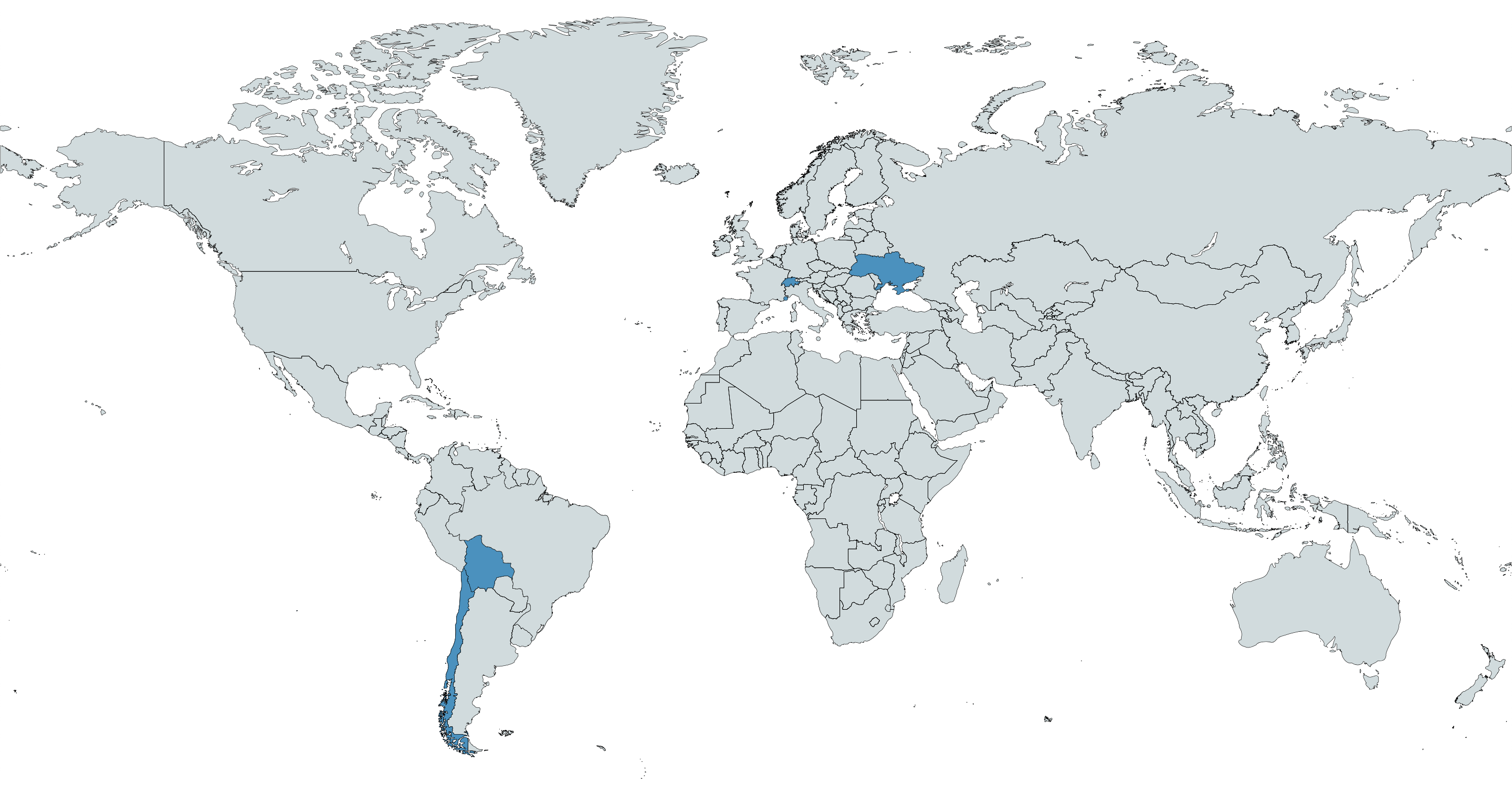
Map with users of the SG 510 in blue

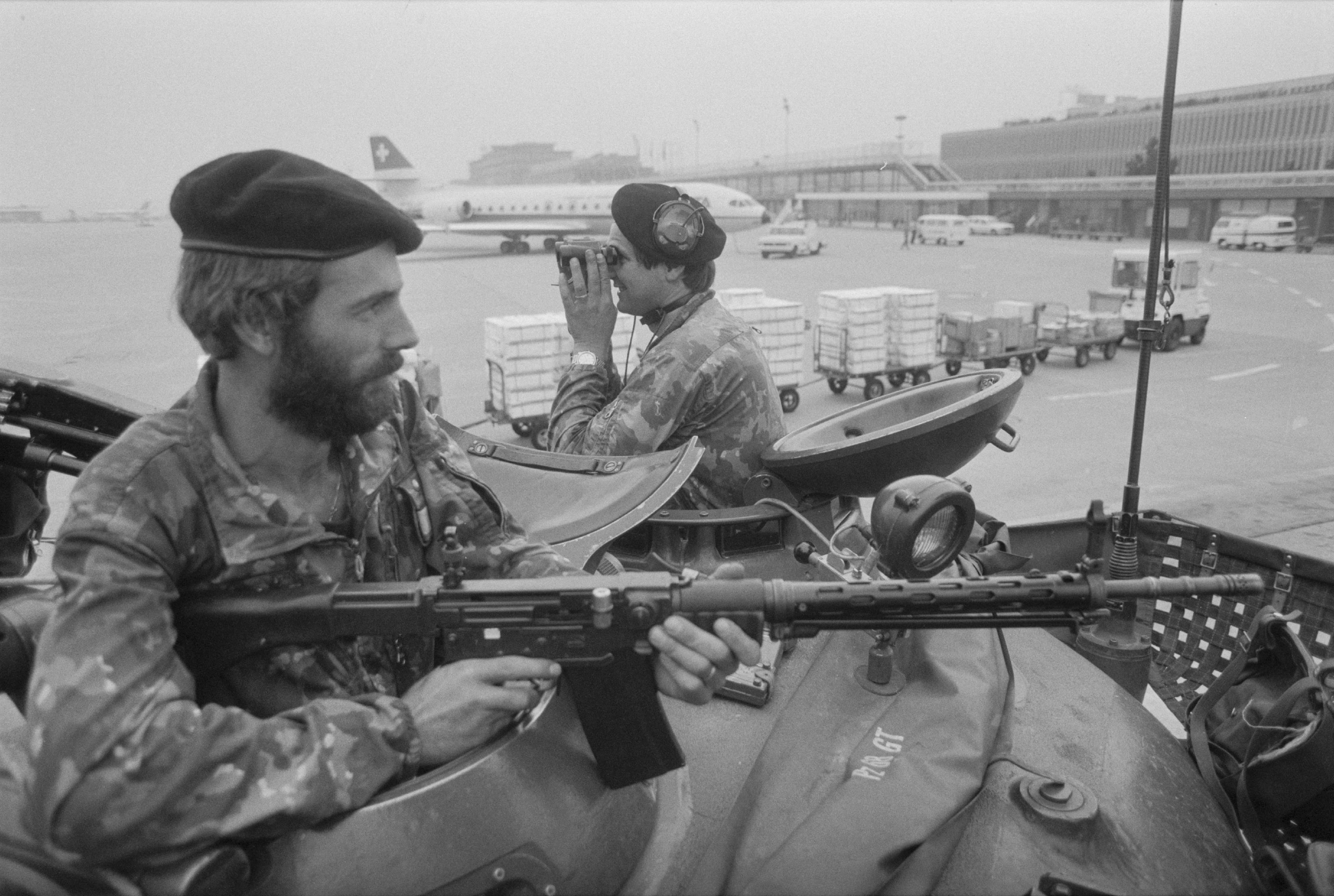
Swiss tank crewmen with the Stgw 57 in 1983.

- Bolivia: SG 510-4 variant.
- Chile
- Monaco: Used by the Compagnie des Carabiniers du Prince.
- Switzerland: Adopted by the Swiss Army in 1957.
- Ukraine
- Zaire

== Gallery ==
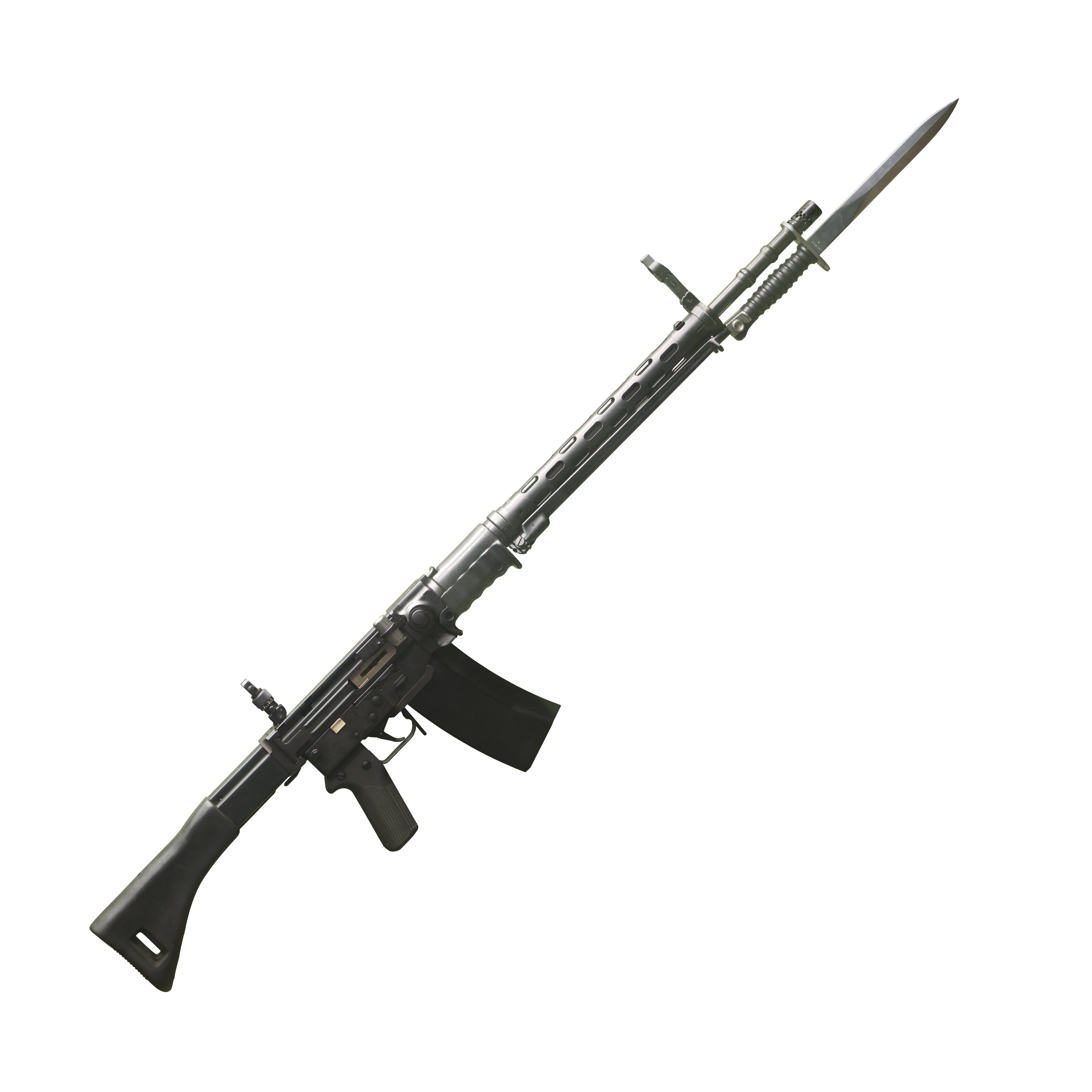
Stgw. 57 with iron sights, bayonet and folded bipod. On display at Morges castle museum.

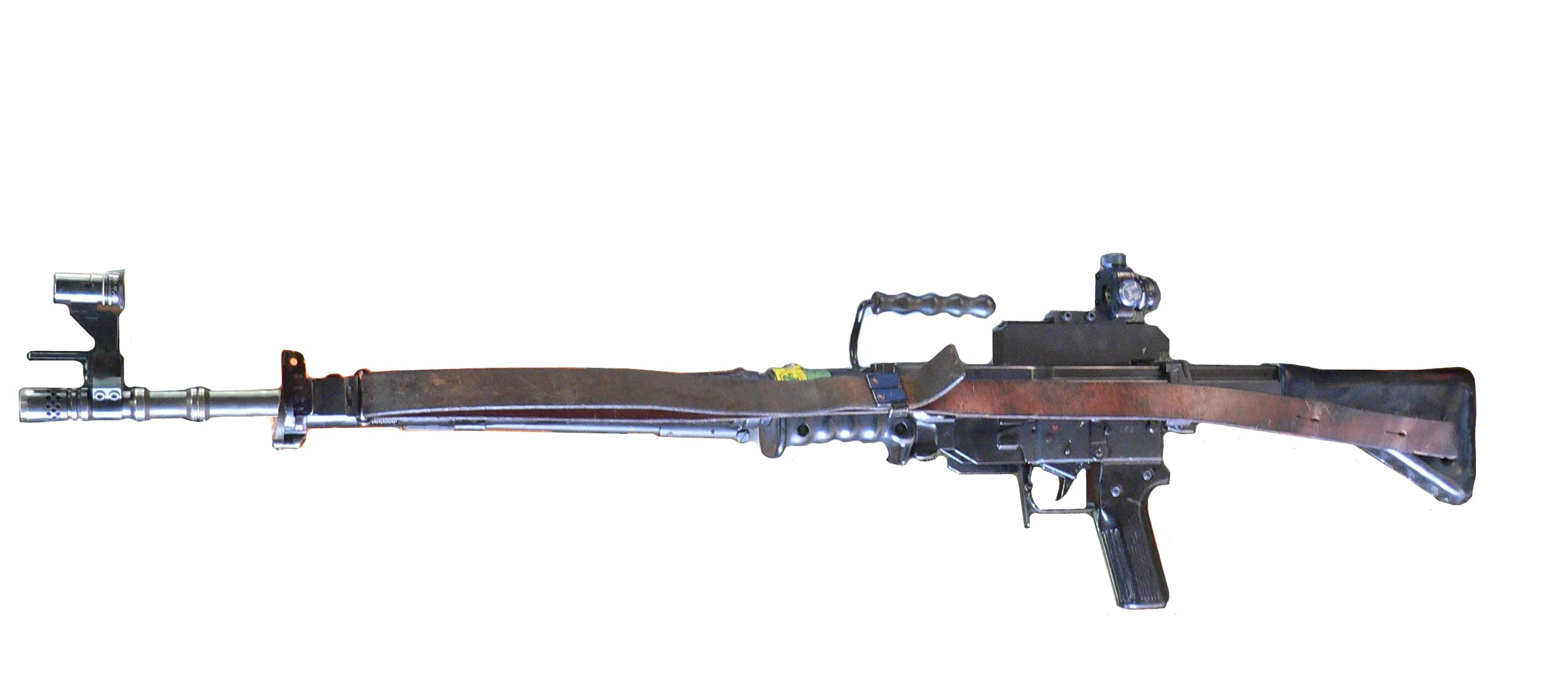
Stgw. 57(/03) modified for sport shooting with a diopter and globe sight sighting line.

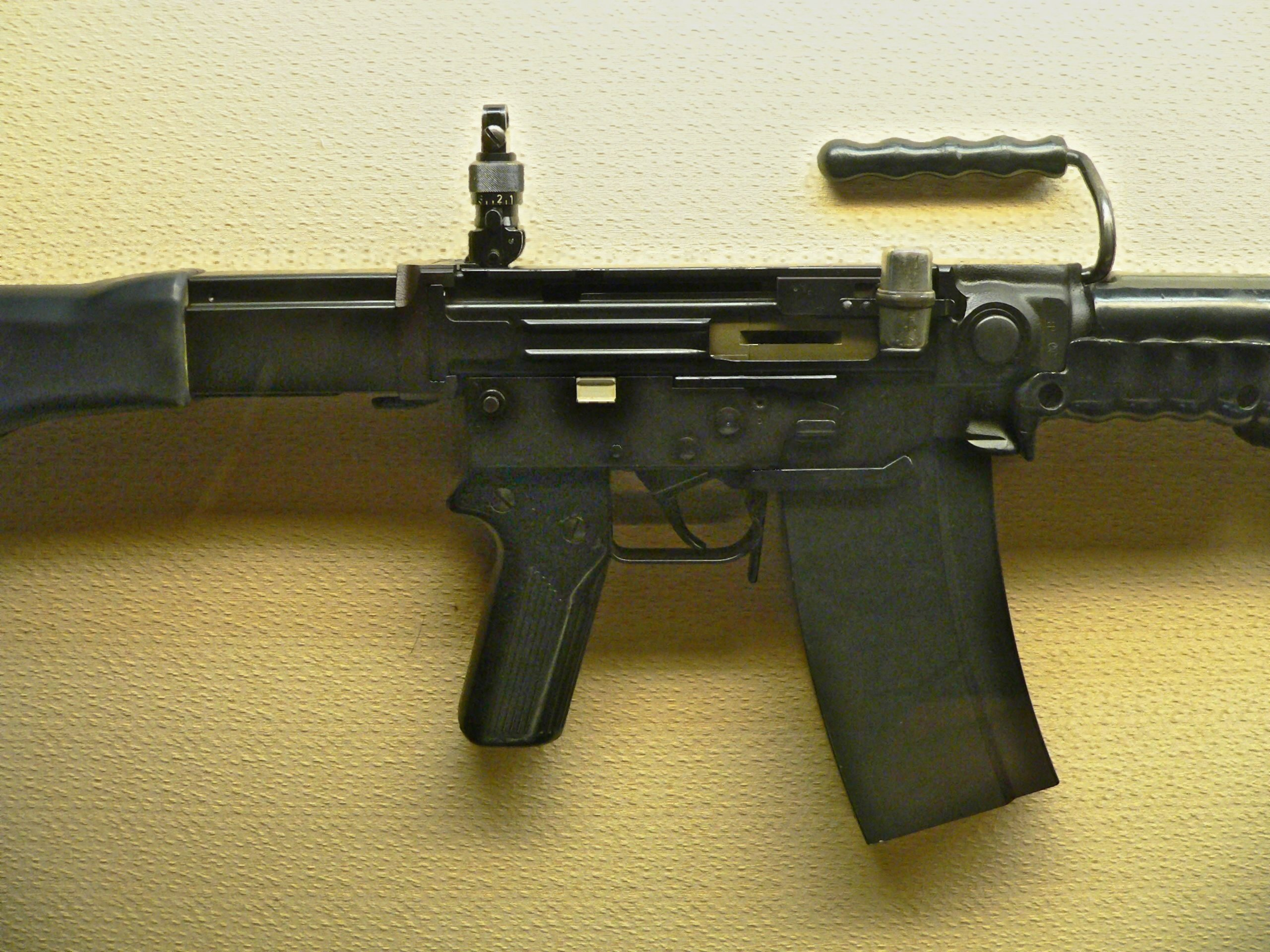
Receiver of a Stgw. 57, seen from the right.

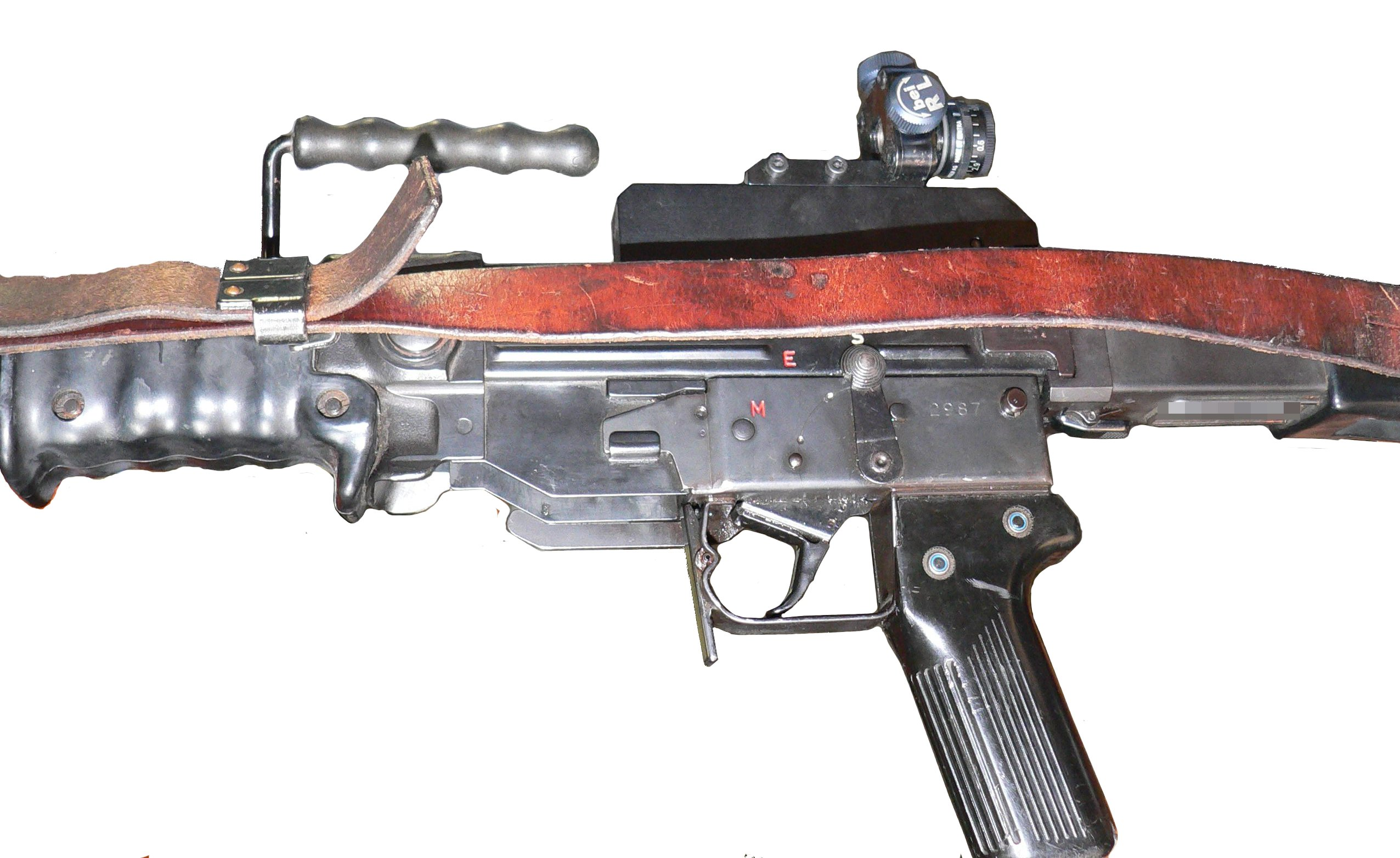
Receiver of a Stgw. 57(/03) modified for sport shooting, seen from the left.

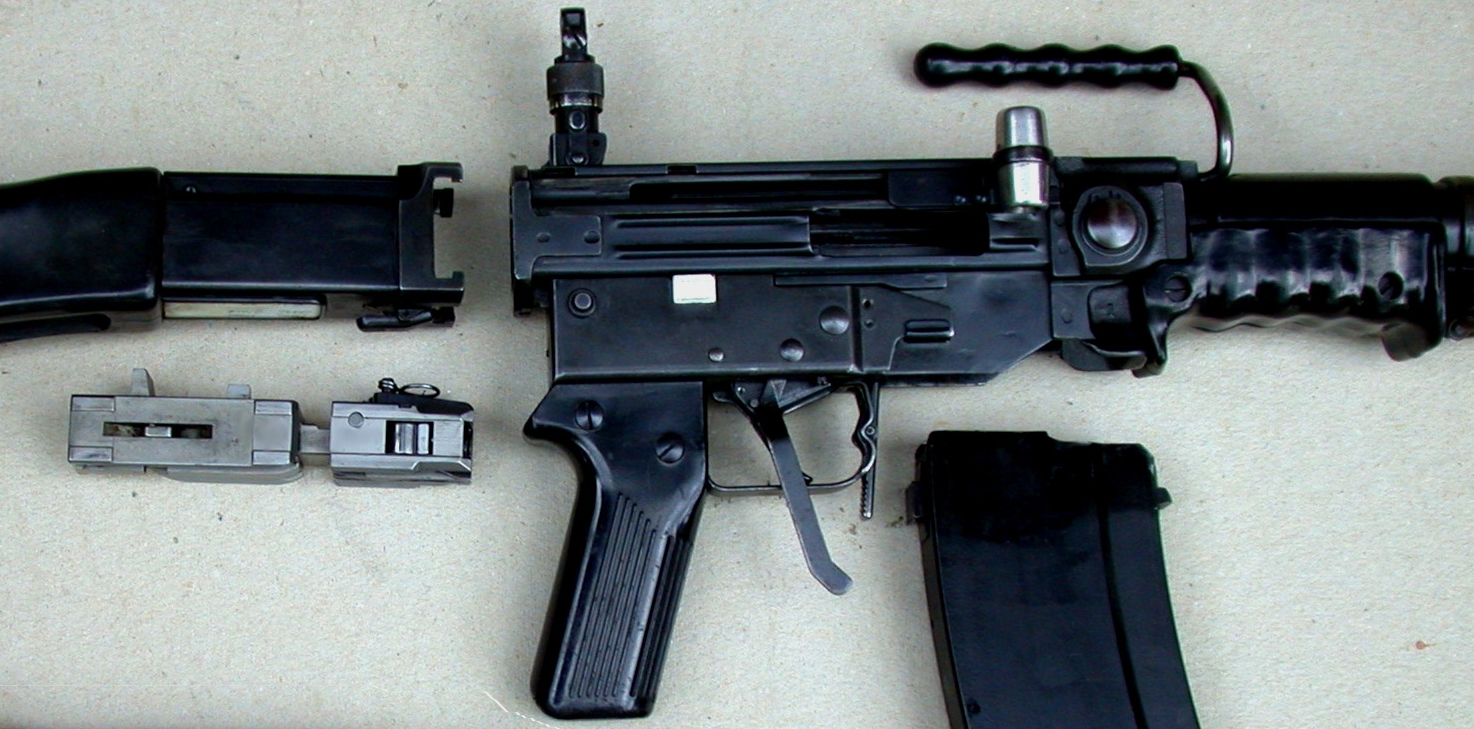
Stgw. 57 dismantled.

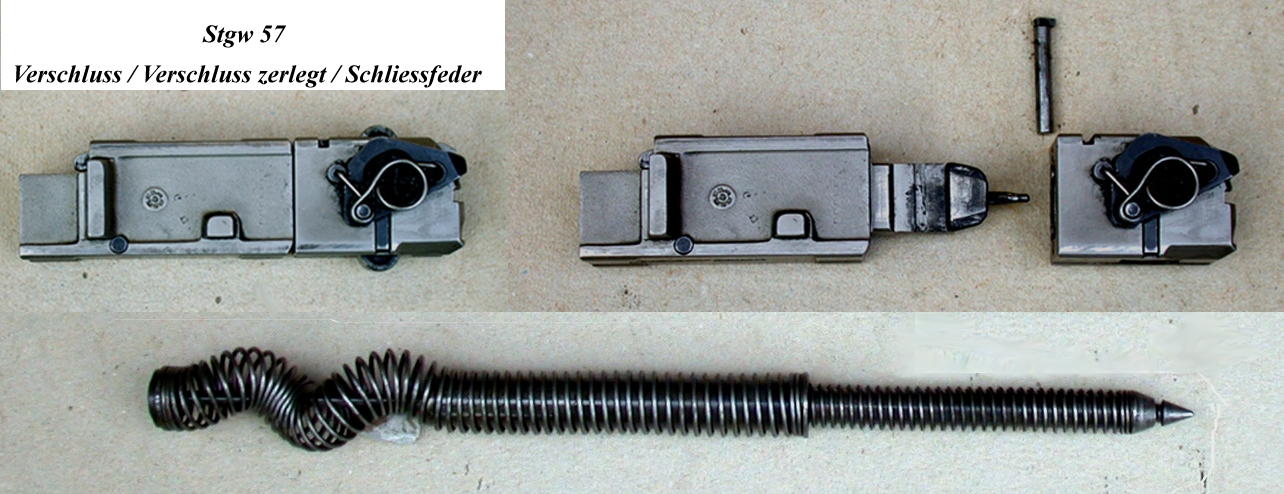
Stgw. 57, bolt, recoil spring.

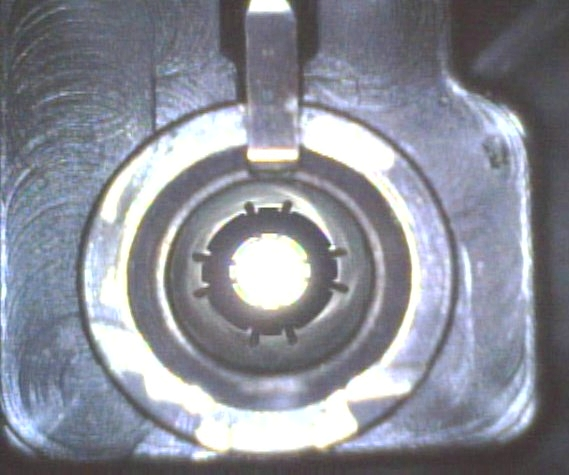
Stgw. 57 stepped & fluted chamber.

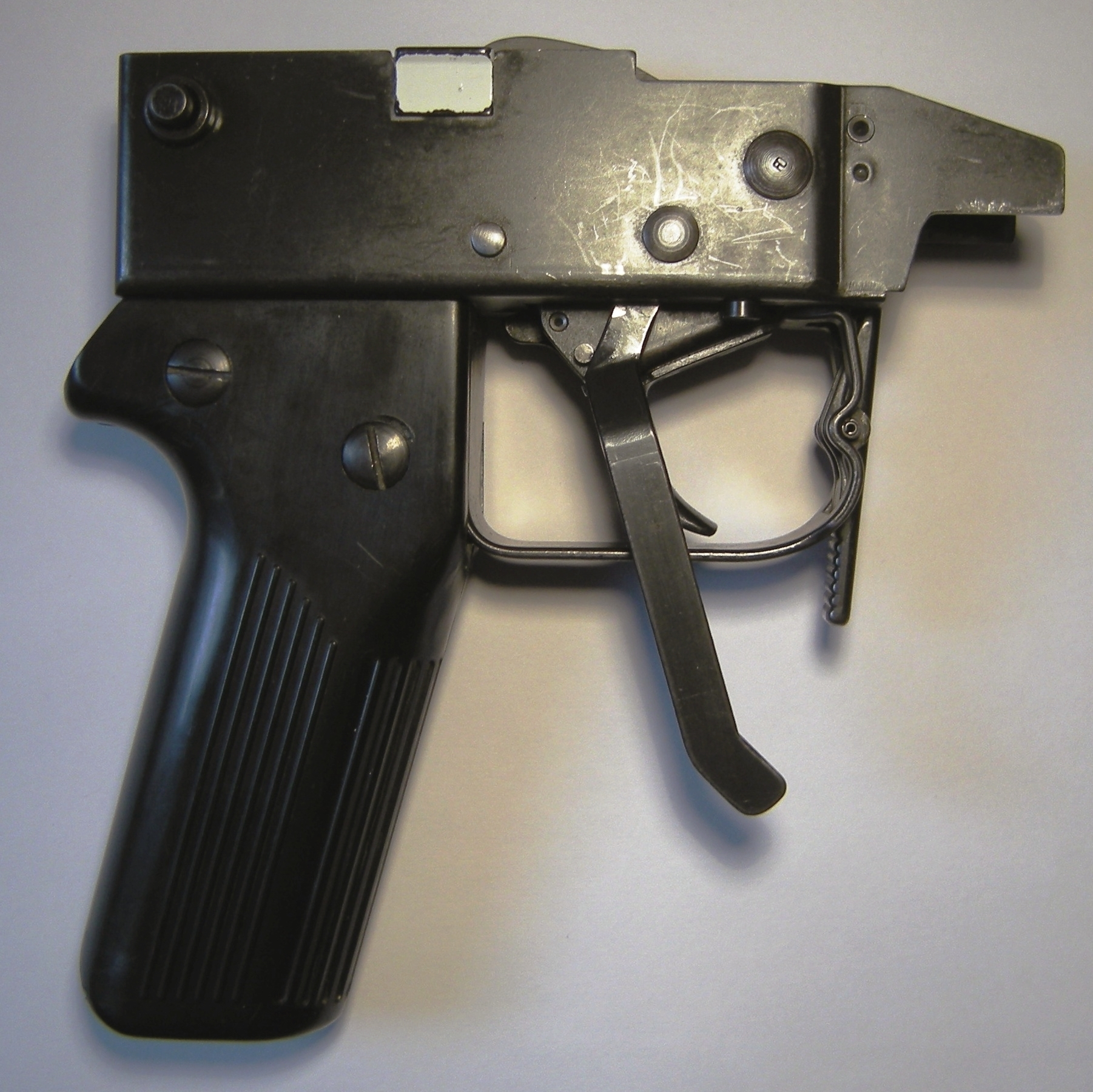
Stgw. 57 trigger housing with winter trigger extended.

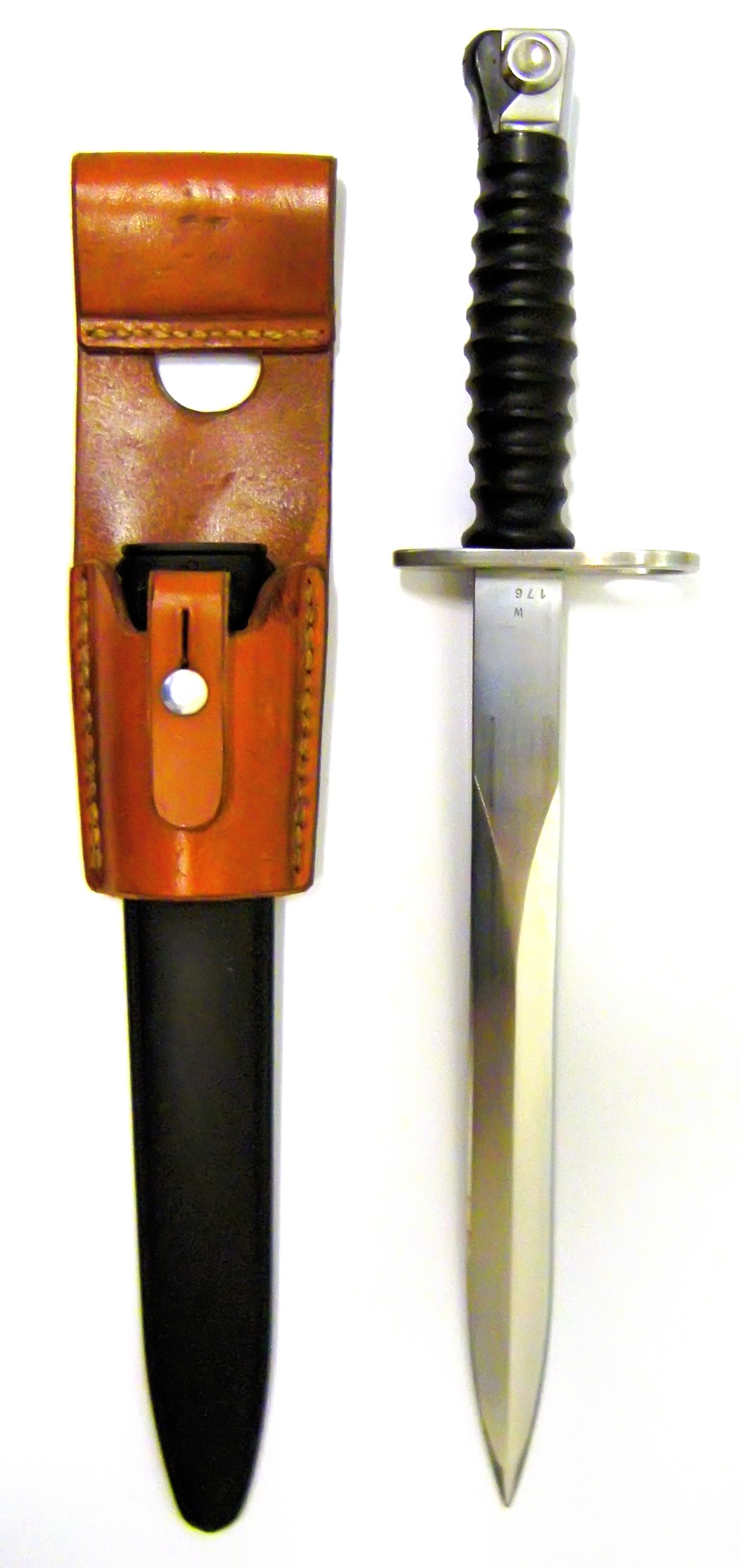
Stgw. 57 bayonet and frog.

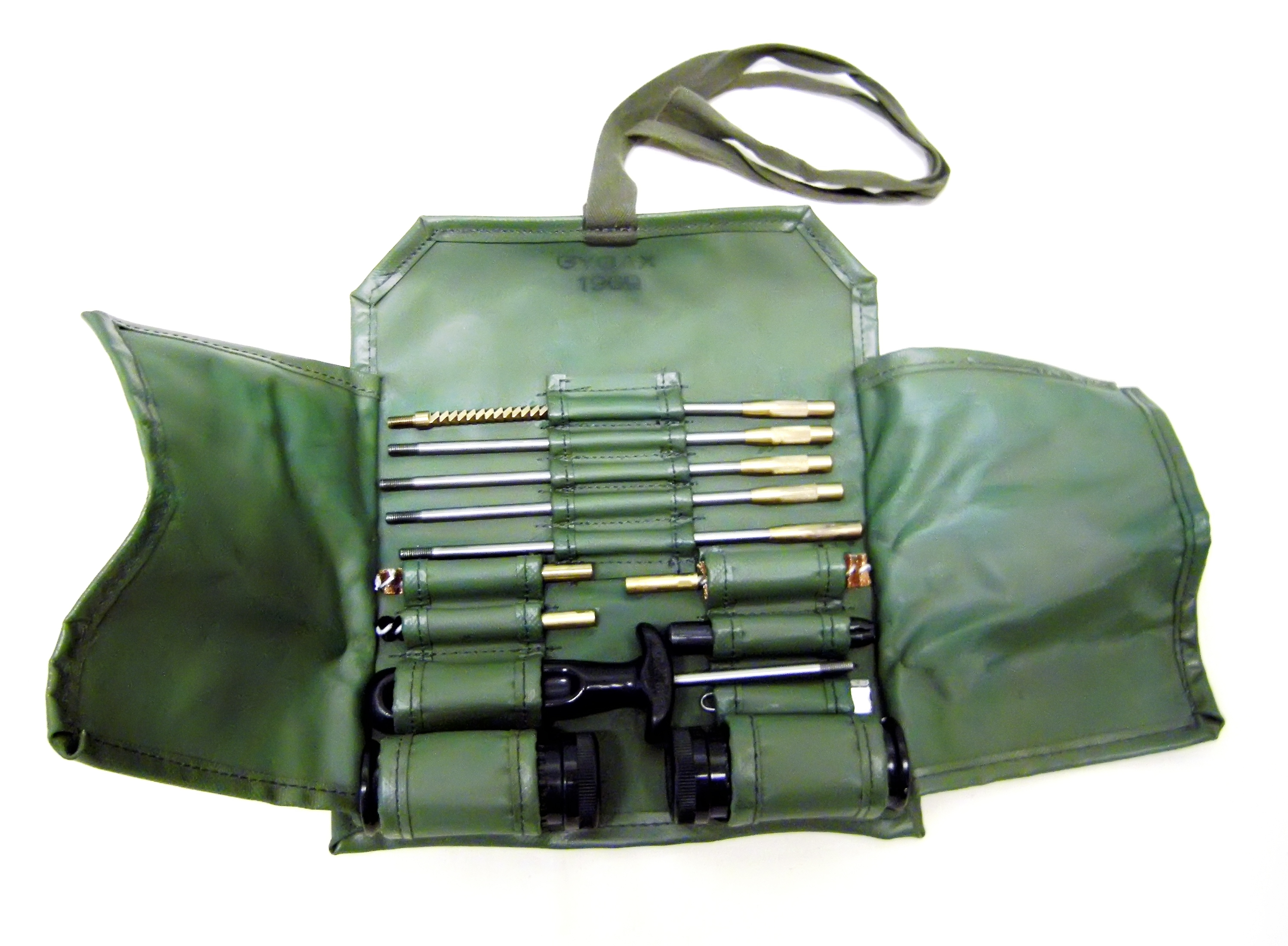
Stgw. 57 cleaning kit pouch.

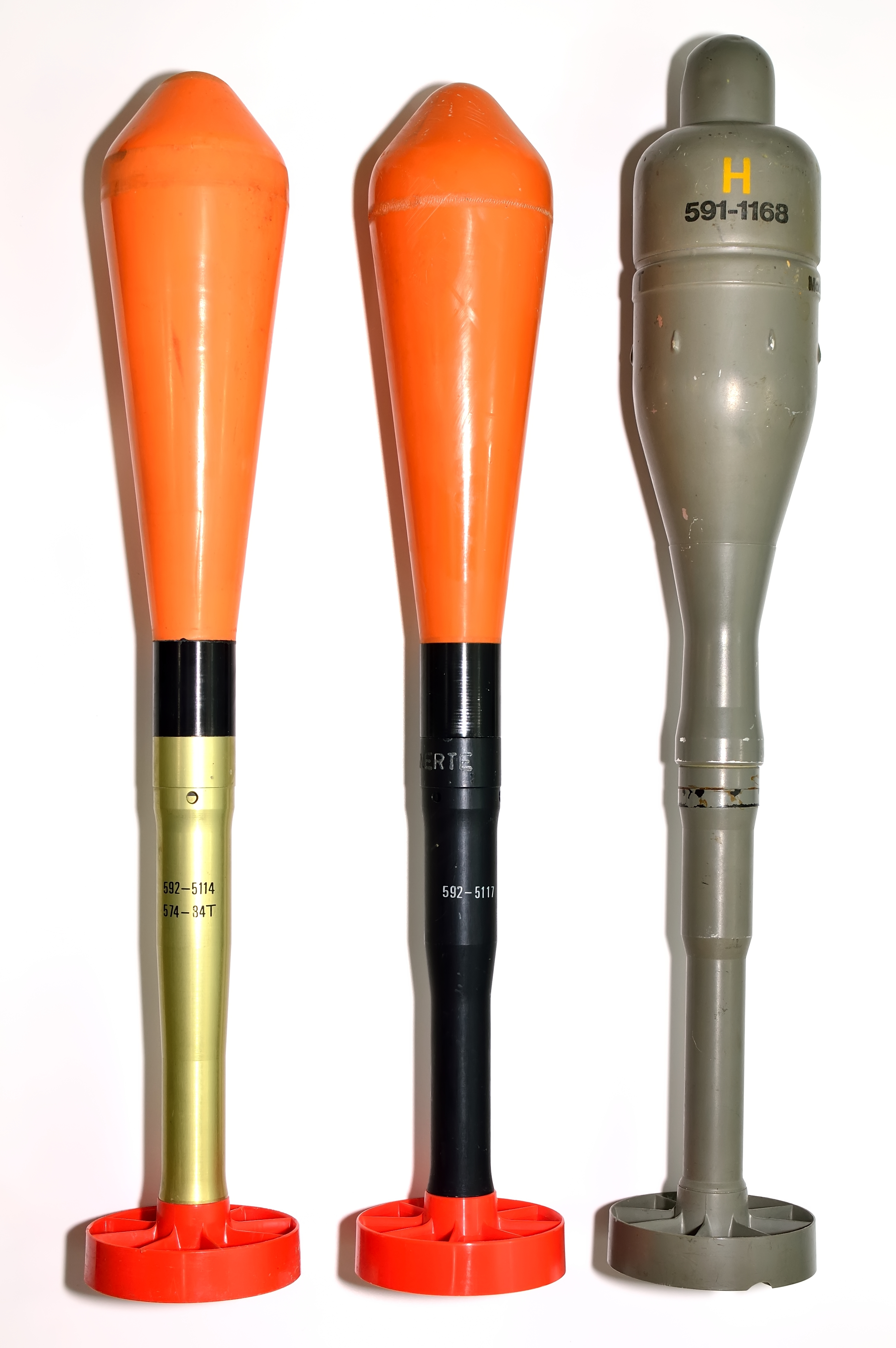
Left to right; boosted and unboosted orange training and a Gw HPz G 58 armour piercing rifle grenades

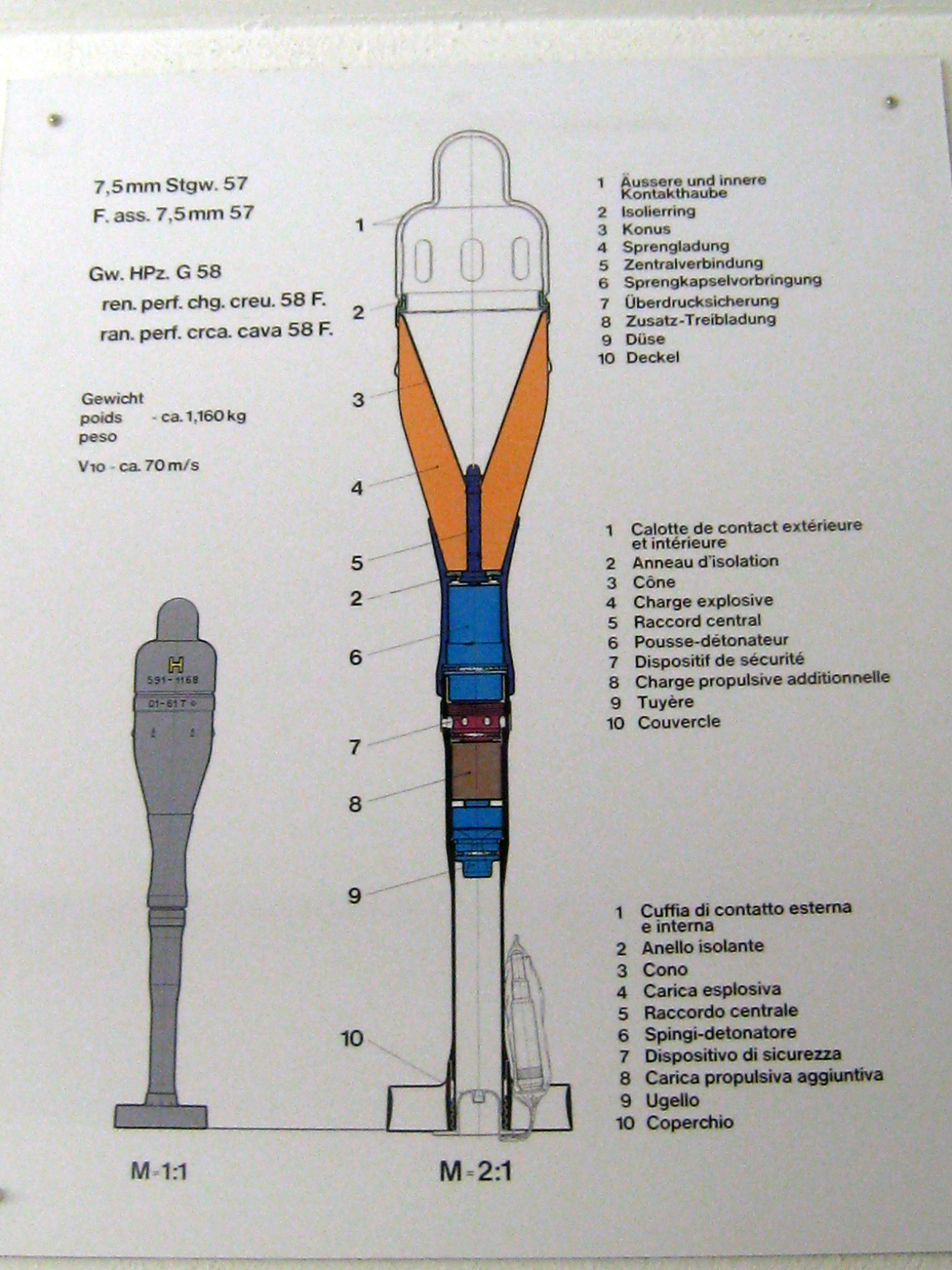
Gw HPz G 58 armour piercing hollow charge rifle grenade poster

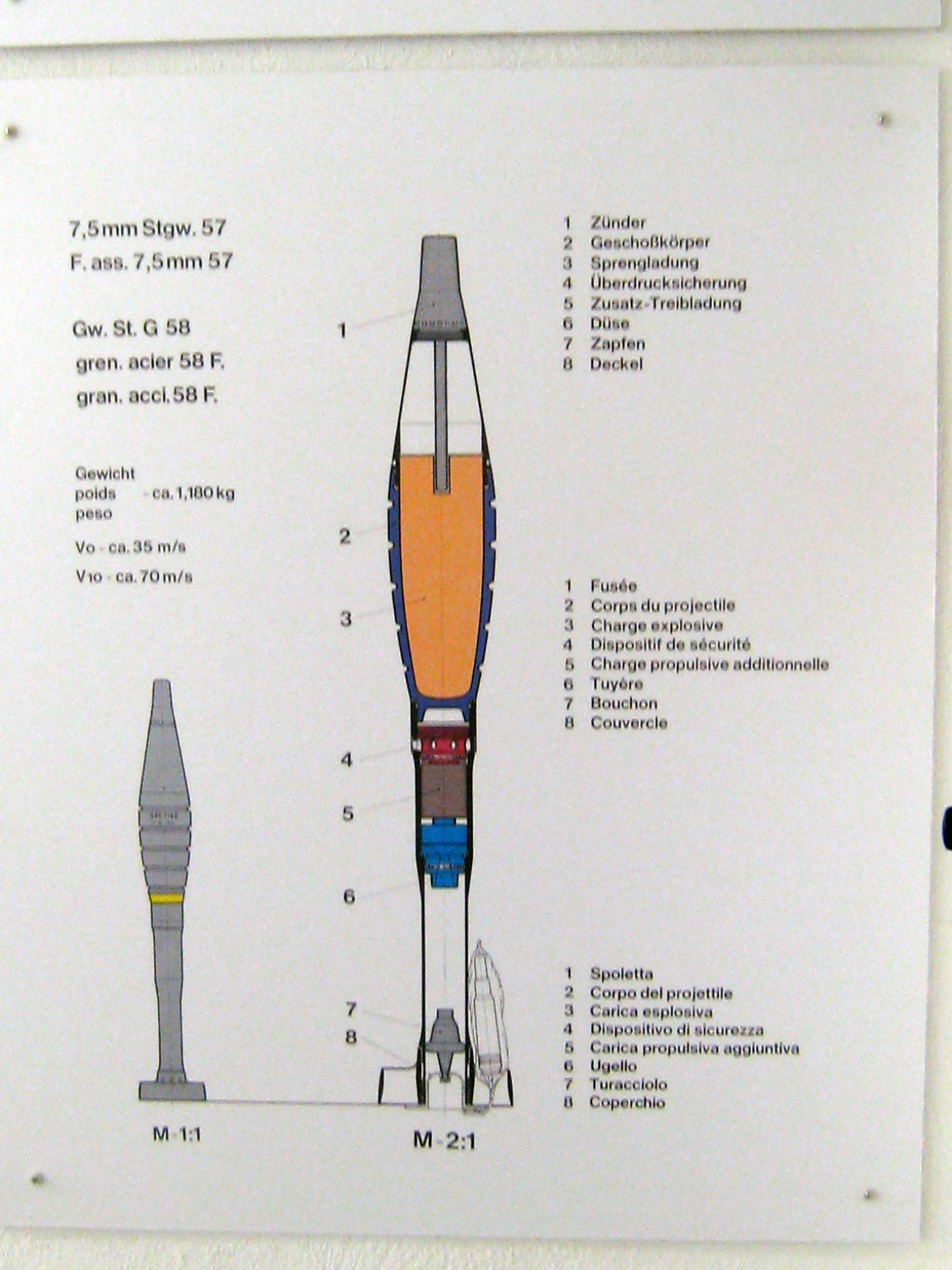
Gw St G 58 fragmentation rifle grenade poster

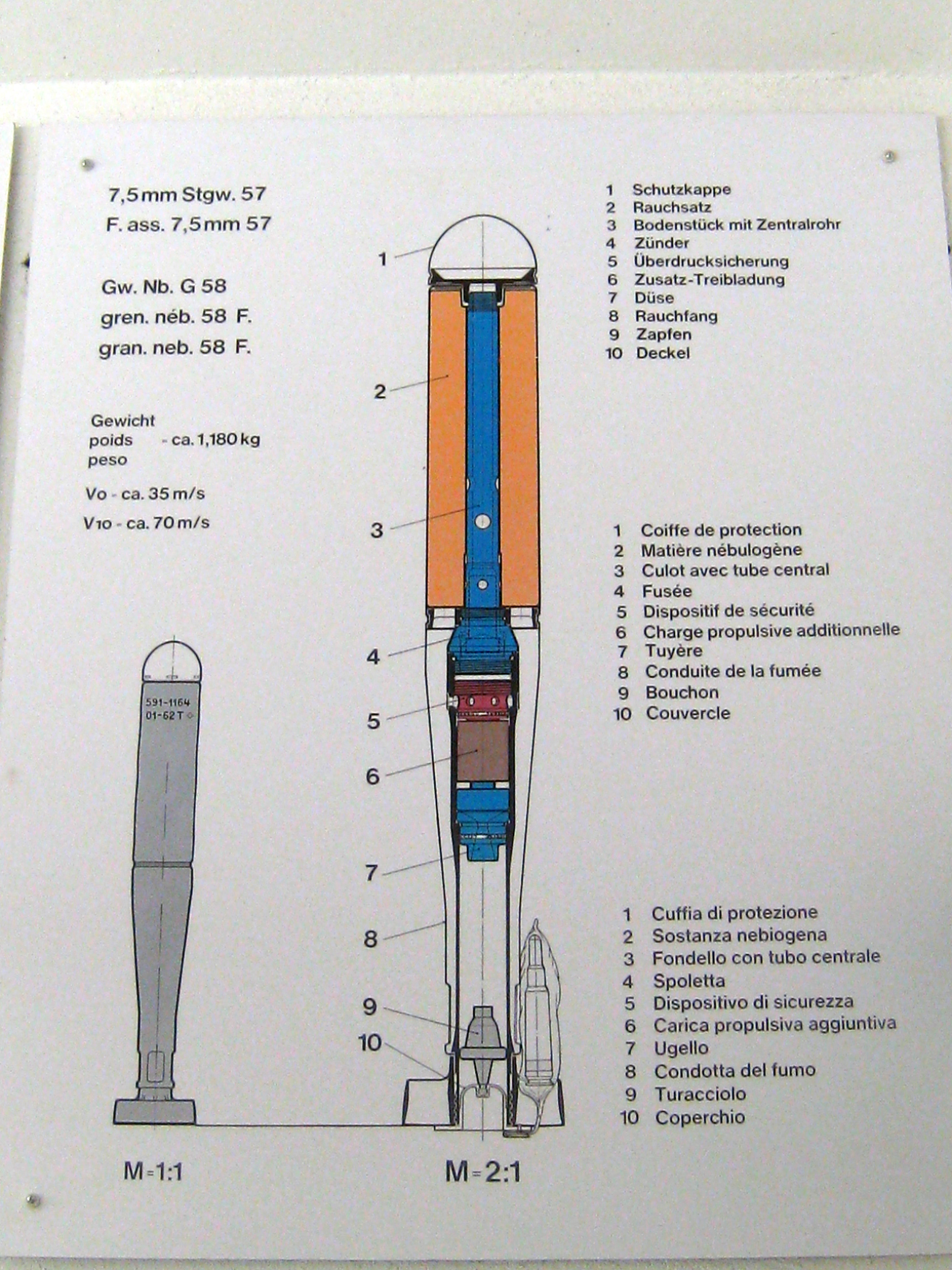
Gw Nb G 58 smoke rifle grenade poster

== See also ==
- List of delayed-blowback firearms
- SIG MG 710-3
- SIG AK53
- Sturmgewehr 52
