= SIG AK53 =

AK-53
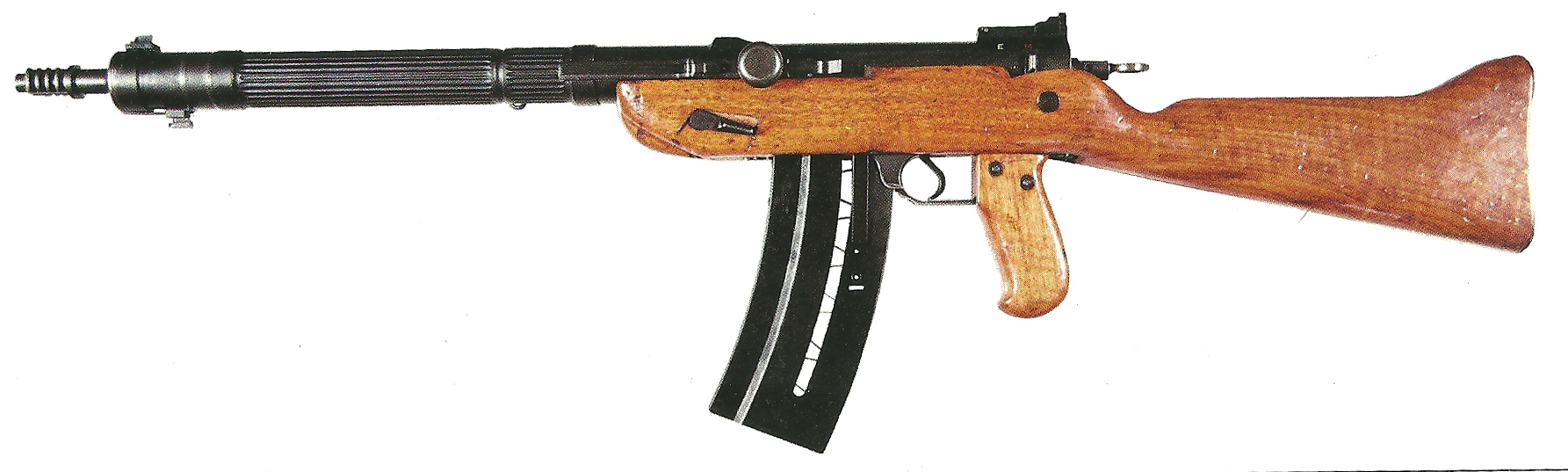
- Type: Battle Rifle
- Place of origin: Switzerland

Production history
- Designed: 1953
- Manufacturer: SIG
- No. built: Approx. 50

Specifications
- Cartridge: 7.5×55mm Swiss
- Action: Gas-Operated
- Feed system: 20 Round Box Magazine
- Sights: Iron sights

The SIG AK53 was an experimental battle rifle from Switzerland that was designed in the early 1950s.

== Operation ==
The AK53 used the gas-operated principle of operation with the barrel moving forward to operate the cycle. Because a piston is used to move the barrel, this action does not fall under the blow-forward concept. The AK53 was developed during the late 1940s and early 1950s but was rejected. However, it did lead to the SIG SG 510 battle rifle, which was in use for over thirty years.
