= Ugram (battle rifle) =

Indian assault rifle

- Type: Battle rifle
- Place of origin: India

Service history
- In service: User Trials
- Used by: (India) Indian Armed Forces

Production history
- Designer: Armament Research and Development Establishment
- Designed: August–September 2022
- Manufacturer: Dvipa Defence

Specifications
- Mass: 3.91 kg (8.6 lb)
- Length: 960 mm (38 in)
- Barrel length: 415 mm (16.3 in)
- Cartridge: 7.62x51mm
- Action: Gas-operated, rotating bolt
- Muzzle velocity: 715-890 m/s
- Effective firing range: 500 m (550 yd)
- Feed system: 20-round magazine (firearms) and is designed to fire both automatic and single-shot modes.
- Sights: Iron sights (100-500 meters Range)

Ugram is a 7.62x51mm battle rifle, designed and developed by the Armament Research and Development Establishment (ARDE), in collaboration with a private industry partner, Dvipa Armour India Private Limited under DcPP. It is intended for use in counter-insurgency and counter-terror operations by Indian Armed Forces, paramilitary units, and special forces, particularly in counter-insurgency and counter-terrorism operations. The rifle is notable for its fully indigenous design, aiming to reduce reliance on foreign suppliers and align with the "Atmanirbhar Bharat" initiative. The name "Ugram" means "ferocious" in Sanskrit.

Ugram is significant to reduce India's dependence on its ageing 5.56 mm INSAS rifle. Moreover, supply chain disruptions resulting from the Ukraine-Russia conflict impacted other rifle-manufacturing projects like the Indo-Russian joint venture to produce AK-203.

== Design and Development ==
The process of design and design-related analysis for Ugram started in 2024. Following its design, Ugram was developed by ARDE and Dvipa in just 100 days, drawing on longstanding experience in development of small arms like the INSAS.

In July 2026, Ugram rifle successfully cleared the Indian Army's General Staff Qualitative Requirement (GSQR) in trials. During evaluations by Central Armed Police Forces (CAPFs), Ugram proved to be superior to peer imported options like the Sig 716 in handling, functional performance, and ergonomics. It also outperforms legacy options like the INSAS and AK-47 through its higher caliber power, lighter weight, and longer effective range.

Mechanically, Ugram operates on a reliable long-stroke gas piston system and utilizes high-strength steel for all internal pressure-bearing components. To enhance its ergonomic profile and reduce overall weight, the rifle features a high-grade nylon-based handguard, pistol grip, and buttstock. Furthermore, it is equipped with modern combat-ready features, including an ambidextrous magazine release and an ergonomic, side-mounted cocking handle, ensuring adaptability and ease of use in diverse operational environments.
