= GRAM 63 battle rifle =

GRAM 63
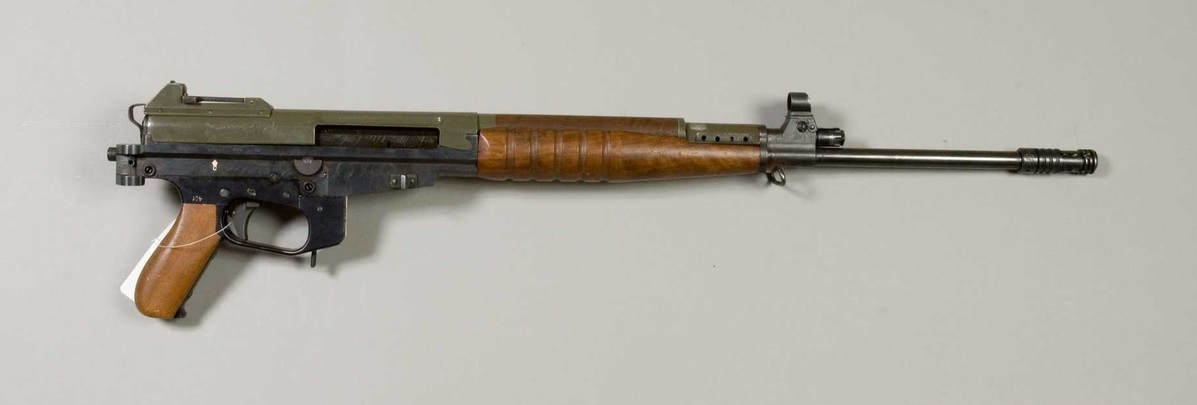
- GRAM 63 kal 6,5mm 1962 401
- Type: Battle rifle
- Place of origin: Sweden

Specifications
- Cartridge: 7.62×51mm NATO
- Caliber: 7.62mm
- Action: Gas
- Feed system: 20-round magazine
- Sights: Iron

The GRAM 63 is a prototype battle rifle that was in trials to replace the semi-automatic Ag m/42 in Swedish Army service and was manufactured by Bofors Carl Gustaf. However, it lost to the license-produced H&K G3 known as the Ak 4.

== See also ==
- Service rifle
- FM 1957 battle rifle
- Ak 5, the Ak 4's replacement and current service rifle of the Swedish Armed Forces.
