= List of firearms (R) =

This is a list of small arms whose manufacturer starts with the letter R—including pistols, shotguns, sniper rifles, submachine guns, personal defense weapons, assault rifles, battle rifles, designated marksman rifles, carbines, machine guns, flamethrowers, multiple-barrel firearms, grenade launchers, anti-tank rifles, and any other variants.

== List ==
- R1A1
- R1A1 Paratrooper Carbine (Republic of South Africa – Shortened Battle Rifle – 7.62×51mm NATO)
- R2A1 (Republic of South Africa, UK – Battle Rifle – 7.62×51mm NATO: Licensed Production FN FAL 50.64 Variant)
- R3A1 (Republic of South Africa, UK – Semi-Automatic Rifle – 7.62×51mm NATO: FN FAL Variant)
- RAI 300 (US – Bolt-Action Anti-Materiel Rifle – .50 BMG)
- RAI 300 Prototype (US – Bolt-Action Sniper Rifle – 7.62×51mm NATO, 8.58×71mm)
- Rast & Gasser M1898 Army Revolver
- Raven Arms
- Raven Arms MP-25(US – Subcompact Semi-Automatic Pistol – .25 ACP)
- Raven Arms MP-25(US –Subcompact Semi-Automatic Pistol – .25 ACP)
- Reider Automatic Rifle (Union of South Africa – Battle Rifle – .303 British: RSAF Lee–Enfield SMLE Variant)
- Remington Arms
- Pistols
- Remington Model 51 (US – Semi-Automatic Pistol – .32 ACP, .380 ACP)
- Remington Model 53 (US – Semi-Automatic Pistol – .45 ACP)
- Remington R51 (US – Semi-Automatic Pistol – 9×19mm)
- Remington XP-100 (US – Single-Shot Bolt-Action Pistol – 6mm BR, 7mm BR, 7mm-08 Remington, .221 Fireball, .223 Remington, .22–250 Remington, .250 Savage, .308 Winchester, .35 Remington)
- Remington XP-100 Custom (US – Single-Shot Bolt-Action Pistol – 6mm BR, 7mm BR, 7mm-08 Remington, .221 Fireball, .223 Remington, .22–250 Remington, .250 Savage, .308 Winchester, .35 Remington)
- Remington XP-100 Hunter (US – Single-Shot Bolt-Action Pistol – 6mm BR, 7mm BR, 7mm-08 Remington, .221 Fireball, .223 Remington, .22–250 Remington, .250 Savage, .308 Winchester, .35 Remington)
- Remington XP-100 Prototype (US – Bolt-Action Pistol- .222 Remington: Prototype)
- Remington XP-100 Silhouette (US – Single-Shot Bolt-Action Pistol – 6mm BR, 7mm BR, 7mm-08 Remington, .221 Fireball, .223 Remington, .22–250 Remington, .250 Savage, .308 Winchester, .35 Remington)
- Remington XP-100 Varmint Special(US - Single-Shot Bolt-Action Pistol – 6mm BR, 7mm BR, 7mm-08 Remington, .221 Fireball, .223 Remington, .22–250 Remington, .250 Savage, .308 Winchester, .35 Remington)
- Remington XP-100R(US – Bolt-Action Pistol – .223 Remington, .22–250 Remington, .260 Remington, .35 Remington)
- Remington XR-100 Rangemaster (US – Single-Shot Bolt-Action Pistol – 6mm BR, 7mm BR, 7mm-08 Remington, .221 Fireball, .223 Remington, .22–250 Remington, .250 Savage, .308 Winchester, .35 Remington)
- Remington Zig-Zag Derringer (US – Derringer Pistol – .22 Short)
- Remington-Rider Single Shot Pistol (US – Single-Shot Derringer Pistol – .17 Parlor)
- Revolvers
- Remington Model 1858 (US – Single-Action Revolver – .31 Percussion, .32 Rimfire, .36 Percussion, .38 Centerfire, .38 Rimfire, .44 Percussion, .46 Rimfire)
- Remington Model 1861 Army Revolver (US – Single-Action Revolver – .44 Percussion)
- Remington Model 1861 Navy Revolver (US – Single-Action Revolver – .36 Percussion)
- Remington New Model Army Revolver (US – Single-Action Revolver – .44 Percussion)
- Remington New Model Navy Revolver (US – Single-Action Revolver – .36 Percussion)
- Remington New Model Pocket Revolver (US – Compact Single-Action Revolver – .31 Percussion, .32 Centerfire)
- Remington New Model Police Revolver (US – Single-Action Revolver – .36 Percussion, .38 Rimfire)
- Remington New Model Single-Action Belt Revolver (US – Single-Action Revolver – .36 Percussion, .38 Centerfire)
- Remington-Beals Army Model Revolver (US – Single-Action Revolver – .44 Percussion)
- Remington-Beals Navy Model Revolver (US – Single-Action Revolver – .36 Percussion)
- Remington-Rider Double-Action New Model Belt Revolver (US – Double-Action Revolver – .36 Percussion, .38 Centerfire)
- Remington Model 1875 (US – Single-Action Revolver – .44 Remington, .44-40 Winchester, .45 Colt)
- Remington Model 1875 Army Revolver (US – Single-Action Revolver – .44 Remington, .44-40 Winchester, .45 Colt)
- Rifles
- M24 Sniper Rifle (US – Bolt-Action Sniper Rifle – 7.62×51mm NATO)
- M24A1 (US – Bolt-Action Sniper Rifle – 7.62×51mm NATO)
- XM24A1 (US – Bolt-Action Sniper Rifle – .300 Winchester Magnum: Prototype)
- M24A2 (US – Bolt-Action Sniper Rifle – .300 Winchester Magnum)
- M24A3 (US – Bolt-Action Sniper Rifle – .338 Lapua Magnum)
- M2010 (US – Bolt-Action Sniper Rifle – .300 Winchester Magnum)

Remington Model 8 (US – Semi-Automatic Rifle – .25 Remington, .30 Remington, .32 Remington, .35 Remington)

- Remington Model 81 Woodsmaster (US – Semi-Automatic Rifle – .25 Remington, .300 Savage)
- Remington Model 12(US – Pump-Action Rifle – .22 Long Rifle)
- Remington Model 14(US – Pump-Action Rifle – .25 Remington, .30 Remington, .32 Remington, .35 Remington)
- Remington Model 14-1/2 (US – Pump-Action Rifle – .38–40 Winchester, .44-40 Winchester)
- Remington Model 14-1/2 Carbine (US – Pump-Action Carbine – .38–40 Winchester, .44-40 Winchester)
- Remington Model 14R Carbine (US – Pump-Action Carbine – .25 Remington, .30 Remington, .32 Remington, .35 Remington)
- Remington Model 141 (US – Pump-Action Rifle – .25 Remington, .30 Remington, .32 Remington, .35 Remington)
- Remington Model 141R Carbine (US – Pump-Action Carbine – .30 Remington, .32 Remington, .35 Remington)
- Remington Model 16(US – Semi-Automatic Rifle – .22 Remington Automatic)
- Remington Model 24(US – Semi-Automatic Rifle – .22 Long Rifle, .22 Short)
- Remington Model 25 (US – Pump-Action Rifle – .25-20 Winchester, .32-20 Winchester)
- Remington Model 30(US – Bolt-Action Rifle – .30-06 Springfield)
- Remington Model 30 Express (US – Bolt-Action Rifle – 7×57mm Mauser, .25 Remington, .257 Roberts, .30 Remington, .30-06 Springfield, .32 Remington, .35 Remington)
- Remington Model 30A Express (US – Bolt-Action Rifle – 7×57mm Mauser, .25 Remington, .257 Roberts, .30 Remington, .30-06 Springfield, .32 Remington, .35 Remington)
- Remington Model 30R Carbine (US – Bolt-Action Carbine – .25 Remington, .30 Remington, .30-06 Springfield, .32 Remington, .35 Remington)
- Remington Model 30SL (US – Bolt-Action Rifle – 7×57mm Mauser, .25 Remington, .257 Roberts, .30 Remington, .30-06 Springfield, .32 Remington, .35 Remington)
- Remington Model 30SM (US – Bolt-Action Rifle – 7×57mm Mauser, .25 Remington, .257 Roberts, .30 Remington, .30-06 Springfield, .32 Remington, .35 Remington)
- Remington Model 30SR (US – Bolt-Action Rifle – 7×57mm Mauser, .25 Remington, .257 Roberts, .30 Remington, .30-06 Springfield, .32 Remington, .35 Remington)
- Remington Model 30SX (US – Bolt-Action Rifle – 7×57mm Mauser, .25 Remington, .257 Roberts, .30 Remington, .30-06 Springfield, .32 Remington, .35 Remington)
- Remington Model 33 (US – Bolt-Action Rifle – .22 Long Rifle)
- Remington Model 34 (US – Bolt-Action Rifle – .22 Long, .22 Long Rifle, .22 Short)
- Remington Model 34 NRA (US – Bolt-Action Rifle – .22 Long, .22 Long Rifle, .22 Short)
- Remington Model 37 (US – Bolt-Action Rifle – .22 Long Rifle)
- Remington Model 40-XS (US – Bolt-Action Rifle – .308 Winchester, .338 Lapua Magnum)
- Remington Model 41 (US – Bolt-Action Rifle – .22 Long Rifle)
- Remington Model 74 (US – Semi-Automatic Rifle – .30-06 Springfield)
- Remington Model 76 (US – Pump-Action Rifle – .30-06 Springfield)
- Remington Model 78 (US – Bolt-Action Rifle – .223 Remington, .243 Winchester, .270 Winchester, .30-06 Springfield, .308 Winchester)
- Remington Model 121 (US – Pump-Action Rifle – .22 Long, .22 Long Rifle, .22 Short, .22 Winchester Rimfire)
- Remington Model 121A (US – Pump-Action Rifle – .22 Long, .22 Long Rifle, .22 Short, .22 Winchester Rimfire)
- Remington Model 121D Peerless (US – Pump-Action Rifle – .22 Long, .22 Long Rifle, .22 Short, .22 Winchester Rimfire)
- Remington Model 121E Expert (US – Pump-Action Rifle – .22 Long, .22 Long Rifle, .22 Short, .22 Winchester Rimfire)
- Remington Model 121ES (US – Pump-Action Rifle – .22 Long, .22 Long Rifle, .22 Short, .22 Winchester Rimfire)
- Remington Model 121F Premier (US – Pump-Action Rifle – .22 Long, .22 Long Rifle, .22 Short, .22 Winchester Rimfire)
- Remington Model 121FS (US – Pump-Action Rifle – .22 Long, .22 Long Rifle, .22 Short, .22 Winchester Rimfire)
- Remington Model 121S Special Grade (US – Pump-Action Rifle – .22 Long, .22 Long Rifle, .22 Short, .22 Winchester Rimfire)
- Remington Model 121SB Smooth Bore (US – Pump-Action Rifle – .22 Long, .22 Long Rifle, .22 Short, .22 Winchester Rimfire)
- Remington Model 241 (US – Semi-Automatic Rifle – .22 Short, .22 Long Rifle)
- Remington Model 341 (US – Bolt-Action Rifle – .22 Long, .22 Long Rifle, .22 Short)
- Remington Model 411 (US – Bolt-Action Rifle – .22 CB Cap)
- Remington Model 504 (US – Bolt-Action Rifle – .17 Hornady Mach 2, .17 Hornady Magnum Rimfire, .22 Long Rifle)
- Remington Model 510 (US – Bolt-Action Rifle – .22 Long Rifle)
- Remington Model 511 (US – Bolt-Action Rifle – .22 Long, .22 Long Rifle, .22 Short)
- Remington Model 511P (US – Bolt-Action Rifle – .22 Long, .22 Long Rifle, .22 Short)
- Remington Model 511SB (US – Bolt-Action Rifle – .22 Long, .22 Long Rifle, .22 Short)
- Remington Model 511X (US – Bolt-Action Rifle – .22 Long, .22 Long Rifle, .22 Short)
- Remington Model 512 (US – Bolt-Action Rifle – .22 Long, .22 Long Rifle, .22 Short)
- Remington Model 512P (US – Bolt-Action Rifle – .22 Long, .22 Long Rifle, .22 Short)
- Remington Model 512SB (US – Bolt-Action Rifle – .22 Long, .22 Long Rifle, .22 Short)
- Remington Model 512X (US – Bolt-Action Rifle – .22 Long, .22 Long Rifle, .22 Short)
- Remington Model 513 (US – Bolt-Action Rifle – .22 Long Rifle)
- Remington Model 513S (US – Bolt-Action Rifle – .22 Long Rifle)
- Remington Model 513T (US – Bolt-Action Rifle – .22 Long Rifle)
- Remington Model 514 (US – Single-Shot Bolt-Action Rifle – .22 Long Rifle)
- Remington Model 521 (US – Bolt-Action Rifle – .22 Long, .22 Long Rifle, .22 Short)
- Remington Model 522 Viper (US – Semi-Automatic Rifle – .22 Long Rifle)
- Remington Model 540X (US – Single-Shot Bolt-Action Rifle – .22 Long Rifle)
- Remington Model 541 (US – Bolt-Action Rifle – .22 Long Rifle)
- Remington Model 550 (US – Semi-Automatic Rifle – .22 Long Rifle)
- Remington Model 550-1 (US – Semi-Automatic Rifle – .22 Long Rifle)
- Remington Model 552 (US – Semi-Automatic Rifle – .22 Long, .22 Long Rifle, .22 Short)
- Remington Model 572 (US – Pump-Action Rifle – .22 Long, .22 Long Rifle, .22 Short)
- Remington Model 580 (US – Bolt-Action Rifle – .22 Long Rifle)
- Remington Model 581 (US – Bolt-Action Rifle – .22 Long Rifle)
- Remington Model 581S (US – Bolt-Action Rifle – .22 Long Rifle)
- Remington Model 582 (US – Bolt-Action Rifle – .22 Long Rifle)
- Remington Model 591 (US – Bolt-Action Rifle – 5mm Remington Magnum Rimfire)
- Remington Model 592 (US – Bolt-Action Rifle – 5mm Remington Magnum Rimfire)
- Remington Model 597 (US – Semi-Automatic Rifle – .17 Hornady Magnum Rimfire, .22 Long Rifle, .22 Winchester Magnum Rimfire)
- Remington Model 600 (US – Bolt Action Rifle – 6mm Remington, .222 Remington, .223 Remington, .308 Winchester, .35 Remington)
- Remington Model 600 Magnum (US – Bolt-Action Rifle – 6.5mm Remington Magnum, .350 Remington Magnum)
- Remington Model 600 Mohawk (US – Bolt-Action Rifle – 6mm Remington, .222 Remington, .223 Remington, .308 Winchester)
- Remington Model 660 (US – Bolt-Action Rifle – 6mm Remington, .222 Remington, .223 Remington, .243 Winchester, .308 Winchester)
- Remington Model 660 Magnum (US – Bolt-Action Rifle – 6.5mm Remington Magnum, .350 Remington Magnum)
- Remington Model 673 (US – Bolt-Action Rifle – 6.5mm Remington Magnum, .300 Remington Short Action Ultra Magnum, .308 Winchester, .350 Remington Magnum)
- Remington Model 700 (US – Bolt-Action Rifle – 6mm Remington, 6mm Remington Magnum, 6.5mm Remington Magnum, 6.5×55mm Swedish, 7mm Remington Express, 7mm Remington Magnum, 7mm Remington Short Action Ultra Mag, 7mm Remington Ultra Mag, 8mm Mauser, 8mm Remington Magnum, 7mm STW, 7mm Weatherby Magnum, 7×57mm Mauser, 7mm-08 Remington, .17 Remington, .204 Ruger, .22–250 Remington, .220 Swift, .221 Fireball, .222 Remington, .222 Remington Magnum, .223 Remington, .243 Winchester, .25-06, .250 Savage, .257 Roberts, .260 Remington, .264 Winchester Magnum, .270 Winchester, .270 WSM, .280 Remington, .30–'06, .300 Savage, .308 Winchester, .300 WSM, .300 Winchester Magnum, .300 Weatherby Magnum, .300 Holland & Holland Magnum, .300 Remington Short Action Ultra Mag, .300 Remington Ultra Mag, .338 Winchester Magnum, .338 Remington Ultra Mag, .35 Whelen, .350 Remington Magnum, .375 Holland & Holland Magnum, .375 Remington Ultra Mag, .416 Remington Magnum, & .458 Winchester Magnum)
- Remington Model 700 5-R "Mil-Spec" (US – Bolt-Action Rifle – Various)
- Remington Model 700 ADL (US – Bolt-Action Rifle – Various)
- Remington Model 700 BDL (US – Bolt-Action Rifle – Various)
- Remington Model 700 CDL (US – Bolt-Action Rifle – Various)
- Remington Model 700 Safari (US – Bolt-Action Rifle – Various)
- Remington Model 700 SPS (US – Bolt-Action Rifle – Various)
- Remington Model 700 Tactical Chassis (US – Bolt-Action Rifle – Various)
- Remington Model 700P (US – Bolt-Action Rifle – .308 Winchester)
- Remington Model 700P LTR (US – Bolt-Action Rifle – .308 Winchester)
- Remington Model 700P Standard (US – Bolt-Action Rifle – .308 Winchester)
- Remington Model 710 (US – Bolt-Action Rifle – 7mm Remington Magnum, .270 Winchester, .300 Winchester Magnum, .30-06 Springfield)
- Remington Model 720 (US – Bolt-Action Rifle – .257 Roberts, .270 Winchester, .30-06 Springfield)
- Remington Model 721 (US – Bolt-Action Rifle – .264 Winchester Magnum, .270 Winchester, .280 Remington, .300 Holland & Holland Magnum, .30-06 Springfield)
- Remington Model 722 (US – Bolt-Action Rifle – .222 Remington, .222 Remington Magnum, .243 Winchester, .244 Remington, .257 Roberts, .300 Savage, .308 Winchester)
- Remington Model 725 (US – Bolt-Action Rifle – .222 Remington, .243 Winchester, .244 Remington, .270 Winchester, .280 Remington, .30-06 Springfield, .375 Holland & Holland Magnum, .458 Winchester Magnum)
- Remington Model 740 (US – Semi-Automatic Rifle – .244 Remington, .280 Remington, .30-06 Springfield, .308 Winchester)
- Remington Model 742 (US – Semi-Automatic Rifle – 6mm Remington, .243 Winchester, .280 Remington, .30-06 Springfield, .308 Winchester)
- Remington Model 750 (US – Semi-Automatic Rifle – .243 Winchester, .270 Winchester, .30-06 Springfield, .308 Winchester, .35 Whelen)
- Remington Model 750 Synthetic (US – Semi-Automatic Rifle – .243 Winchester, .270 Winchester, .30-06 Springfield, .308 Winchester, .35 Whelen)
- Remington Model 750 Woodsmaster (US – Semi-Automatic Rifle – .243 Winchester, .270 Winchester, .30-06 Springfield, .308 Winchester, .35 Whelen)
- Remington Model 760 (US – Pump-Action Rifle – 6mm Remington, .222 Remington, .223 Remington, .243 Winchester, .244 Remington, .257 Roberts, .270 Winchester, .280 Remington, .30-06 Springfield, .300 Savage, .308 Winchester, .35 Remington)
- Remington Model 760C (US – Pump-Action Rifle – 6mm Remington, .222 Remington, .223 Remington, .243 Winchester, .244 Remington, .257 Roberts, .270 Winchester, .280 Remington, .30-06 Springfield, .300 Savage, .308 Winchester, .35 Remington)
- Remington Model 770 (US – Bolt-Action Rifle – 7mm Remington Mag, 7mm-08 Remington, .243 Winchester, .270 Winchester, 30-06 Springfield, .308 Winchester, 300 Winchester Magnum)
- Remington Model 788 (US – Bolt-Action Rifle – 6mm Remington, 7mm-08 Remington, .222 Remington, .223 Remington, .22–250 Remington, .243 Winchester, .308 Winchester, .30-30 Winchester, .44 Magnum)
- Remington Model 7400 (US – Semi-Automatic Rifle – 6mm Remington, 7mm Remington Express, .243 Winchester, .270 Winchester, .280 Remington, .30-06 Springfield, .308 Winchester, .35 Whelen)
- Remington Model 7400 Carbine (US – Semi-Automatic Carbine – 6mm Remington, 7mm Remington Express, .243 Winchester, .270 Winchester, .280 Remington, .30-06 Springfield, .308 Winchester, .35 Whelen)
- Remington Model 7400 Special Purpose (US – Semi-Automatic Rifle – 6mm Remington, 7mm Remington Express, .243 Winchester, .270 Winchester, .280 Remington, .30-06 Springfield, .308 Winchester, .35 Whelen)
- Remington Model 7400 Synthetic (US – Semi-Automatic Rifle – 6mm Remington, 7mm Remington Express, .243 Winchester, .270 Winchester, .280 Remington, .30-06 Springfield, .308 Winchester, .35 Whelen)
- Remington Model 7600 (US – Pump-Action Rifle – 6mm Remington, .243 Winchester, .270 Winchester, .280 Remington,.30-06 Springfield, .308 Winchester, .35 Whelen)
- Remington Model 7600 Carbine(US – Pump-Action Rifle – .30-06 Springfield, .308 Winchester)
- Remington Model 7600 Special Purpose (US – Pump-Action Rifle – 6mm Remington, .243 Winchester, .270 Winchester, .280 Remington, .30-06 Springfield, .308 Winchester, .35 Whelen)
- Remington Model 7600 Synthetic (US – Pump-Action Rifle – 6mm Remington, .243 Winchester, .270 Winchester, .280 Remington, .30-06 Springfield, .308 Winchester, .35 Whelen)
- Remington Model 7600P (US – Pump-Action Rifle – .308 Winchester)
- Remington Model 7615P (US Pump-Action Rifle .223 Remington)
- Remington Model Four (US – Semi-Automatic Rifle – 6mm Remington, .243 Winchester, .270 Winchester, .280 Remington, .308 Winchester)
- Remington Model Four Collectors Edition (US – Semi-Automatic Rifle – .30-06 Springfield)
- Remington Model R-15 VTR (US – Semi-Automatic Rifle – .204 Ruger, .223 Remington)
- Remington Model Six (US – Pump-Action Rifle – 6mm Remington, .243 Winchester, .270 Winchester, .30-06 Springfield, .308 Winchester)
- Remington Model Seven (US – Bolt-Action Rifle – 6mm Remington, 6.8×43mm Remington SPC, 7mm Remington Short Action Ultra Magnum, 7mm-08 Remington, .17 Remington, .222 Remington, .223 Remington, .243 Winchester, .250 Savage, .260 Remington, .300 Remington Short Action Ultra Magnum, .308 Winchester, .35 Remington, .350 Remington Magnum)
- Remington Mohawk 10C (US – Semi-Automatic Rifle – .22 Long Rifle)
- Remington Nylon 10(US – Bolt-Action Rifle – .22 Long Rifle)
- Remington Nylon 11(US – Bolt-Action Rifle – .22 Long Rifle)
- Remington Nylon 12(US – Bolt-Action Rifle – .22 Long Rifle)
- Remington Nylon 66(US – Semi-Automatic Rifle – .22 Long Rifle)
- Remington Nylon 66AB (US – Semi-Automatic Rifle – .22 Long Rifle)
- Remington Nylon 66BD (US – Semi-Automatic Rifle – .22 Long Rifle)
- Remington Nylon 66GS (US – Semi-Automatic Rifle – .22 Long Rifle)
- Remington Nylon 66MB (US – Semi-Automatic Rifle – .22 Long Rifle)
- Remington Nylon 66SG (US – Semi-Automatic Rifle – .22 Long Rifle)
- Remington Nylon 76 (US – Lever-Action Rifle – .22 Long Rifle)
- Remington Nylon 77 (US – Semi-Automatic Rifle – .22 Long Rifle)
- Remington SR-8 (US – Bolt-Action Rifle – .338 Lapua Magnum)
- Shotguns
- Remington Model 9 (US – Single-Shot Shotgun – 10 Gauge, 12 Gauge, 16 Gauge, 20 Gauge, 24 Gauge, 28 Gauge)
- Remington Model 10 (US – Pump-Action Shotgun – 12 Gauge)
- Remington Model 11 (US – Semi-Automatic Shotgun – 12 Gauge, 16 Gauge, 20 Gauge)
- Remington Model 11-48 (US – Semi-Automatic Shotgun – 12 Gauge, 16 Gauge, 20 Gauge, 28 Gauge, .410 Bore)
- Remington Model 11-87 (US – Semi-Automatic Shotgun – 12 Gauge, 20 Gauge)
- Remington Model 11-96 (US – Semi-Automatic Shotgun – 12 Gauge)
- Remington Sportsman (US – Semi-Automatic Shotgun – 12 Gauge, 16 Gauge, 20 Gauge)
- Remington Model 17 (US – Pump-Action Shotgun – 20 Gauge)
- Remington Model 29 (US – Pump-Action Shotgun – 12 Gauge)
- Remington Model 31 (US – Pump-Action Shotgun – 12 Gauge, 16 Gauge, 20 Gauge)
- Remington Model 32 (US – Over/Under Shotgun – 12 Gauge)
- Remington Model 48 (US – Semi-Automatic Shotgun – 12 Gauge, 16 Gauge, 20 Gauge)
- Remington Model 58 (US – Semi-Automatic Shotgun – 12 Gauge, 16 Gauge, 20 Gauge)
- Remington Model 90-T (US – Single-Shot Shotgun – 12 Gauge)
- Remington Model 300 (US – Over/Under Shotgun – 12 Gauge)
- Remington Model 320 (US – Over/Under Shotgun – 12 Gauge)
- Remington Model 332 (US – Over/Under Shotgun – 12 Gauge)
- Remington Model 396 (US – Over/Under Shotgun – 12 Gauge)
- Remington Model 870 (US – Pump-Action Shotgun – 12 Gauge, 16 Gauge, 20 Gauge, 24 Gauge, 28 Gauge, .410 Bore)
- Remington Model 870 Express (US – Pump-Action Shotgun – 12 Gauge, 16 Gauge, 20 Gauge, 24 Gauge, 28 Gauge, .410 Bore)
- Remington Model 870 Marine (US – Pump-Action Shotgun – 12 Gauge, 16 Gauge, 20 Gauge, 24 Gauge, 28 Gauge, .410 Bore)
- Remington Model 870 Mark 1 (US – Pump-Action Shotgun – 12 Gauge, 16 Gauge, 20 Gauge, 24 Gauge, 28 Gauge, .410 Bore)
- Remington Model 870 MCS (US Pump-Action Shotgun – 12 Gauge, 16 Gauge, 20 Gauge, 24 Gauge, 28 Gauge, .410 Bore)
- Remington Model 870 Police (US – Pump-Action Shotgun – 12 Gauge, 16 Gauge, 20 Gauge, 24 Gauge, 28 Gauge, .410 Bore)
- Remington Model 870 SOW (US – Automatic Shotgun – 12 Gauge)
- Remington Model 870 Super Mag (US – Pump-Action Shotgun – 12 Gauge, 16 Gauge, 20 Gauge, 24 Gauge, 28 Gauge, .410 Bore)
- Remington Model 870 Wingmaster (US – Pump-Action Shotgun – 12 Gauge, 16 Gauge, 20 Gauge, 24 Gauge, 28 Gauge, .410 Bore)
- Remington Model 878 (US – Semi-Automatic Shotgun – 12 Gauge)
- Remington Model 1100 (US – Semi-Automatic Shotgun – 12 Gauge, 16 Gauge, 20 Gauge, .410 Bore)
- Remington Model 1889 (US – Side by Side Shotgun – 10 Gauge, 12 Gauge, 16 Gauge)
- Remington Model 1893 (US – Single-Shot Shotgun – 10 Gauge, 12 Gauge, 16 Gauge, 20 Gauge, 24 Gauge, 28 Gauge, .410 Bore)
- Remington Model 3 (US – Single-Shot Shotgun – 10 Gauge, 12 Gauge, 16 Gauge, 20 Gauge, 24 Gauge, 28 Gauge, .410 Bore)
- Remington Model 1894 (US – Side by Side Shotgun – 10 Gauge, 12 Gauge, 16 Gauge)
- Remington Model 1900 (US – Side by Side Shotgun – 12 Gauge, 16 Gauge)
- Remington Model 3200 (US – Over/Under Shotgun – 12 Gauge)
- Remington Model SP-10 (US – Semi-Automatic Shotgun – 10 Gauge)
- Remington Spartan 100 (US, Russia – Single-Shot Shotgun – 10 Gauge, 12 Gauge, 20 Gauge, .410 Bore)
- Remington Spartan 310 (US, Russia – Over/Under Shotgun – 12 Gauge, 20 Gauge, 28 Gauge, .410 Bore)
- Republic Arms Patriot (US – Pistol)
- Republic of Croatia State Arsenals
- Submachine Guns
- Agram 2000 (Republic of Croatia – Republic of Croatia State Arsenals – 1990s – Submachine Gun – 9×19mm Parabellum: Based on the Italian Beretta M12 submachine gun.)
- Agram 2002 (Republic of Croatia – Republic of Croatia State Arsenals – 1990s – Submachine Gun – 9×19mm Parabellum: Variant of the Croatian Agram 2000 submachine gun.)
- Rexio
- Revolvers
- Rexio Jaguar (Argentina – Double-Action Revolver – .38 S&W Special)
- Rexio Pucara (Argentina – Double-Action Revolver – .38 S&W Special)
- Shotguns
- Rexio Seguridad (Argentina – Subcompact Shotgun – 12 Gauge)
- Rexio Super 250-M (Argentina – Subcompact Shotgun – 12 Gauge)
- Rexio Supervivencia (Argentina – Subcompact Shotgun – 12 Gauge)
- RGA-86 (Polish People's Republic – Semi-Automatic Grenade Launcher – 26mm Grenade)
- RH-ALAN
- Launchers
- RH-ALAN RGB1 (Republic of Croatia, US – Underslung Grenade Launcher – 40×46mm Grenade: AAI M203 Copy)
- RH-ALAN RGB6 (Republic of Croatia, South Africa – Semi-Automatic Grenade Launcher – 40×46mm Grenade: Licensed Production Milkor MGL)
- Pistols
- RH-ALAN HS-95 (Republic of Croatia – Semi-Automatic Pistol – 9×19mm Parabellum)
- Rifles
- RH-ALAN APS95 (Republic of Croatia – Assault Rifle – 5.56×45mm NATO)
- RH-ALAN MACS-M2A (Republic of Croatia – Single-Shot Bolt-Action Anti-Materiel Rifle – .50 BMG)
- RH-ALAN MACS-M3 (Republic of Croatia – Single-Shot Bolt-Action Anti-Materiel Rifle – .50 BMG)
- RH-ALAN RT-20 (Republic of Croatia – Bolt-Action Anti-Materiel Rifle 20×110mm)
- Submachine Guns
- RH-ALAN ERO (Republic of Croatia – Submachine Gun – 9×19mm Parabellum: Micro Uzi Copy)
- Rheinmetall Borsig
  - Machine Guns
- FG 42 (Nazi Germany – Squad Automatic Weapon – 7.92×57mm Mauser)
- MG3 (West Germany – General-Purpose Machine Gun – 7.62×51mm NATO)
- MG1 (West Germany – General-Purpose Machine Gun – 7.62×51mm NATO)
- MG1A1 (West Germany – General-Purpose Machine Gun – 7.62×51mm NATO)
- MG1A2 (West Germany – General-Purpose Machine Gun – 7.62×51mm NATO)
- MG1A3 (West Germany – General-Purpose Machine Gun – 7.62×51mm NATO)
- MG1A5 (West Germany – General-Purpose Machine Gun – 7.62×51mm NATO)
- MG1A4 (West Germany – General-Purpose Machine Gun – 7.62×51mm NATO)
- MG3A1 (West Germany – Vehicle-Mounted General-Purpose Machine Gun – 7.62×51mm NATO)
- MG3E (West Germany – General-Purpose Machine Gun – 7.62×51mm NATO)
- MG3KWS (West Germany – General-Purpose Machine Gun – 7.62×51mm NATO)
- MG 15 (Weimar Republic – General-Purpose Machine Gun – 7.92×57mm Mauser)
- MG 30 (Austria, Nazi Germany, Switzerland – General-Purpose Machine Gun – 7×57mm Mauser, 7.92×57mm Mauser, 8×56mmR 31.M)
- MG 34 (Nazi Germany – General-Purpose Machine Gun – 7.92×57mm Mauser)
- MG 34/41 (Nazi Germany – General-Purpose Machine Gun – 7.92×57mm Mauser: Prototype)
- MG 81 (Nazi Germany – General-Purpose Machine Gun – 7.92×57mm Mauser)
- MG 81z (Nazi Germany – General-Purpose Machine Gun – 7.92×57mm Mauser)
- MG 42 (Nazi Germany – General-Purpose Machine Gun – 7.92×57mm Mauser)
- MG 2 (West Germany, Nazi Germany – General-Purpose Machine Gun – 7.62×51mm NATO)
- MG 45 (Nazi Germany – General-Purpose Machine Gun – 7.92×57mm Mauser)
- MG 131 (Nazi Germany – Aircraft-Mounted Heavy Machine Gun – 13×64mmB)
- Mk 20 Rh 202 (West Germany – AutoCannon – 20×139mm)
- RIA General Officer's Model (US – Semi-Automatic Pistol)
- RIA General Officer's Model M9 (US – Semi-Automatic Pistol – 9×19mm Parabellum)
- RIA General Officer's Model M15 (US – Semi-Automatic Pistol – .45 ACP)
- Ribeyrolles 1918 automatic carbine (France – Assault Rifle – 8×35mm Ribeyrolle: Prototype)
- RND Manufacturing
- Rifles
- RND Pistol
- RND 400
- RND 800
- RND 1000
- RND 2000
- RND 2100
- RND 2500
- RND 2600
- RND 3000
- Robar Companies, Inc.
- Rifles
- Robar RC-50 (US – Bolt-Action Anti-Materiel Rifle – .50 BMG)
- Robar SR-60D(US – Bolt-Action Sniper Rifle – .308 Winchester)
- Robinson Armament Co.
- Rifles
- Robinson Armaments M96 Expeditionary (US – Semi-Automatic Rifle – 5.56×45mm NATO)
- Robinson Armaments M96-A1 Revere (US – Carbine – 5.56×45mm NATO)
- Robinson Armaments XCR (US – Semi-Automatic Rifle)
- Robinson Armaments XCR-L (US – Semi-Automatic Rifle – 5.45×39mm, 5.56×45mm NATO, 6.5mm Grendel, 6.8×43mm Remington SPC, 7.62×39mm)
- Robinson Armaments XCR-L Micro (US – Compact Semi-Automatic Rifle – 5.45×39mm, 5.56×45mm NATO, 6.5mm Grendel, 6.8×43mm Remington SPC, 7.62×39mm)
- Robinson Armaments XCR-L Mini (US – Semi-Automatic Carbine – 5.45×39mm, 5.56×45mm NATO, 6.5mm Grendel, 6.8×43mm Remington SPC, 7.62×39mm)
- Robinson Armaments XCR-L Pistol (US – Subcompact Semi-Automatic Rifle – 5.45×39mm, 5.56×45mm NATO, 6.5mm Grendel, 6.8×43mm Remington SPC, 7.62×39mm)
- Robinson Armaments XCR-M (US – Semi-Automatic Rifle – 7.62×51mm NATO, .260 Remington, .308 Winchester)
- Robinson Armaments XCR-M Mini (US – Semi-Automatic Carbine – 7.62×51mm NATO, .260 Remington, .308 Winchester)
- Rocky Mountain Patriot Pistol (US – Subcompact Semi-Automatic Rifle – .223 Remington)
- Romanian SAR-1 (Romania – Semi-Automatic Rifle – 7.62×39mm)
- Romanian SAR-2 (Romania – Semi-Automatic Rifle – 5.45×39mm)
- Romanian WASR
- Romanian WASR-2 (Romania – Semi-Automatic Rifle – 5.45×39mm)
- Romanian WASR-3 (Romania – Semi-Automatic Rifle – 5.56×45mm NATO)
- Romanian WASR-10 (Romania – Semi-Automatic Rifle – 7.62×39mm)
- Romanian WASR-22 (Romania – Semi-Automatic Rifle – .22)
- RATMIL
- Rifles
- ROMTEHNICA-RATMIL PM md. 63(Socialist Republic of Romania – Assault Rifle – 7.62×39mm)
- ROMTEHNICA-RATMIL PM md. 64 (Socialist Republic of Romania – Squad Automatic Weapon – 7.62×39mm)
- ROMTEHNICA-RATMIL PM md. 65(Socialist Republic of Romania – Assault Rifle – 7.62×39mm)
- ROMTEHNICA-RATMIL PM md. 80(Socialist Republic of Romania – Carbine – 7.62×39mm)
- ROMTEHNICA-RATMIL PM md. 90(Socialist Republic of Romania – Assault Rifle – 7.62×39mm)
- ROMTEHNICA-RATMIL PM md. 90 Short Barreled Variant (Socialist Republic of Romania – Carbine – 7.62×39mm)
- ROMTEHNICA-RATMIL PSL (Socialist Republic of Romania – Semi-Automatic Designated Marksman Rifle – 7.62×54mmR)
- ROMTEHNICA-RATMIL PSL-54C (Socialist Republic of Romania – Semi-Automatic Designated Marksman Rifle – 7.62×51mm NATO)
- ROMTEHNICA-RATMIL WUM-1 (Socialist Republic of Romania – Semi-Automatic Rifle – 7.62×39mm)
- Submachine Guns
- RATMIL md. 96 (Romania – Subcomapct Submachine Gun – 9×19mm NATO)
- Rossi Firearms
- Revolvers
- Rossi M971 (Federative Republic of Brazil – Double-Action Revolver – .357 S&W Magnum)
- Rossi M9711 (Federative Republic of Brazil – Double-Action Revolver – .357 S&W Magnum)
- Shotguns
- Rossi Single Barrel Shotgun(Federative Republic of Brazil – Single-Shot Break-Action Shotgun – 12 Gauge)
- Royal MG34 machine pistol (Kingdom of Spain – Machine Pistol – 7.63×25mm Mauser)
- Royal Small Arms Factory
- Launchers
- ARWEN 37 (UK – Non-Lethal Launcher – 37mm Non-Lethal Rounds)
- ARWEN ACE (UK – Breech-Loaded Non-Lethal Launcher – 37mm Non-Lethal Rounds)
- Machine Guns
- Bren Light Machine Gun
- Bren Mk I (UK – Light Machine Gun – .303 British)
- Bren Mk II (UK – Light Machine Gun – .303 British)
- Bren Mk III (UK – Light Machine Gun – .303 British)
- Bren Mk IV (UK – Light Machine Gun – .303 British)
- Taden Gun (UK – Light Machine Gun – .280 British: Prototype)
- Revolvers
- Enfield Revolver (UK – Double-Action Revolver – .476 Enfield)
- Enfield Revolver Mk I (UK – Double-Action Revolver – .476 Enfield)
- Enfield Revolver Mk II (UK – Double-Action Revolver – .476 Enfield)
- Rifles
- Boys Anti-Tank Rifle (UK – Bolt-Acton Anti-Tank Rifle – .55 Boys)
- Boys Anti-Tank Rifle Mk I (UK – Bolt-Acton Anti-Tank Rifle – .55 Boys)
- Boys Anti-Tank Rifle Mk II (UK – Bolt-Acton Anti-Tank Rifle – .55 Boys)
- Enfield 1917 (US, UK – Bolt-Action Rifle – .30–'06)
- Enfield EM2 (UK – Battle Rifle – 6.25×43mm, 7.62×51mm NATO, .280 British: Prototype)
- Enfield L64/65 (UK – Assault Rifle – 4.85×49mm: Prototype)
- Enfield XL70 (UK – Assault Rifle – 5.56×45mm NATO: Prototype)
- Enfield SA80 (UK – Assault Rifle – 5.56×45mm NATO)
- L22A1 Carbine (UK – Carbine – 5.56×45mm NATO)
- L85 (UK – Assault Rifle – 5.56×45mm NATO)
- L85A1 (UK – Assault Rifle – 5.56×45mm NATO)
- L85A2 (UK – Assault Rifle – 5.56×45mm NATO)
- L86 LSW (UK – Assault Rifle – 5.56×45mm NATO)
- L86A1 LSW (UK – Assault Rifle – 5.56×45mm NATO)
- L86A2 LSW (UK – Assault Rifle – 5.56×45mm NATO)
- L98 Cadet Rifle (UK – Assault Rifle – 5.56×45mm NATO)
- L98A1 Cadet Rifle (UK – Assault Rifle – 5.56×45mm NATO)
- L98A2 Cadet Rifle (UK – Assault Rifle – 5.56×45mm NATO)
- Lee–Enfield (UK – Bolt-Action Rifle – 7.62×51mm NATO, .303 British)
- Magazine Lee–Enfield (UK – Bolt-Action Rifle – 7.62×51mm NATO, .303 British)
- Charger Loading Lee–Enfield (UK – Bolt-Action Rifle – .303 British)
- Lee–Enfield Cavalry Carbine Mk I (UK – Bolt-Action Carbine – .303 British)
- New Zealand Carbine (UK – Bolt-Action Carbine – .303 British)
- Royal Irish Constabulary Carbine (UK – Bolt-Action Carbine – .303 British)
- Rifle No. 4 Mk I (UK – Bolt-Action Carbine – .303 British)
- Rifle No. 4 Mk I/2 (UK – Bolt-Action Carbine – .303 British)
- Rifle No. 4 Mk I (UK – Bolt-Action Carbine – .303 British)
- Rifle No. 4 Mk I/3 (UK – Bolt-Action Carbine – .303 British)
- Rifle No. 4 Mk 2 (UK – Bolt-Action Carbine – .303 British)
- Rifle No. 5 Mk I (UK – Bolt-Action Carbine – .303 British)
- Rifle No. 6 Mk I (UK – Bolt-Action Carbine – .303 British)
- Short Magazine Lee–Enfield (UK – Bolt-Action Carbine – .303 British)
- Pattern 1913 Enfield (UK – Bolt-Action Carbine – .276 Enfield: Prototype)
- M1917 Enfield (UK, US – Bolt-Action Carbine – .30-06 Springfield)
- Pattern 1914 Enfield(UK – Bolt-Action Carbine – .303 British)
- Rifle No. 3 (UK – Bolt-Action Carbine – .303 British)
- Short Magazine Lee–Enfield Mk I(UK – Bolt-Action Carbine – .303 British)
- Short Magazine Lee–Enfield Mk II (UK – Bolt-Action Carbine – .303 British)
- Short Magazine Lee–Enfield Mk III(UK – Bolt-Action Carbine – .303 British)
- Rifle No. 1 Mk III(UK – Bolt-Action Carbine – .303 British)
- Rifle No. 2 Mk III(UK – Bolt-Action Carbine – .22 Long Rifle)
- Rifle No. 7 Mk III(UK – Bolt-Action Carbine – .22 Long Rifle)
- Rifle No. 8 Mk III(UK – Bolt-Action Carbine – .22 Long Rifle)
- Rifle No. 9 Mk III(UK – Bolt-Action Carbine – .22 Long Rifle)
- Rifle No. 1 Mk V(UK – Bolt-Action Carbine – .303 British)
- Rifle No. 1 Mk VI(UK – Bolt-Action Carbine – .303 British)
- Short Magazine Lee–Enfield Mk III(UK – Bolt-Action Carbine – .303 British)
- Rifle No. 1 Mk III(UK – Bolt-Action Carbine – .303 British)
- Short Magazine Lee–Enfield Mk III (HT) (UK – Bolt-Action Sniper Rifle – .303 British)
- Rifle No. 2 Mk III (UK – Bolt-Action Carbine – .22 Long Rifle)
- Short Magazine Lee–Enfield Mk V (UK – Bolt-Action Carbine – .303 British)
- Martini–Henry Carbine Mark 1(UK – Breech-Loaded Single Shot Rifle – 7.65×53mm Argentine, 11.43×55mmR, 11.43×59mmR, .303 British, .577/450 Boxer-Henry, .577/450 Martini–Henry)
- Pattern 1853 Enfield (UK – Rifled Musket – .577 Ball)
- Submachine Guns
- Machine Carbine Experimental Model
- MCEM 1(UK Submachine gun 9×19mm Parabellum: Prototype)
- MCEM 2 (UK – Submachine gun – 9×19mm Parabellum: Prototype)
- MCEM 3 (UK – Submachine gun – 9×19mm Parabellum: Prototype)
- MCEM 4(UK – Submachine gun 9×19mm Parabellum: Prototype)
- MCEM 5(UK – Submachine gun 9×19mm Parabellum: Prototype)
- MCEM 6(UK – Submachine gun 9×19mm Parabellum: Prototype)
- Sten Submachine Gun(UK – Submachine Gun 9×19mm Parabellum)
- Sten Mk I (UK – Submachine Gun 9×19mm Parabellum)
- Sten Mk I (UK – Submachine Gun – 9×19mm Parabellum)
- Sten Mk II (UK – Submachine Gun – 9×19mm Parabellum)
- Sten Mk IIS (UK – Submachine Gun - 9×19mm Parabellum)
- Sten Mk III(UK – Submachine Gun – 9×19mm Parabellum)
- Sten Mk V (UK – Submachine Gun – 9×19mm Parabellum)
- Sten Mk VI (UK – Submachine Gun – 9×19mm Parabellum)
- RPB Industries
- Pistols
- RPB Industries M-10 (US – Semi-Automatic Pistol – .45 ACP: Ingram MAC-10 Variant)
- RPC Fort
- Pistols

Fort-12 (Ukraine – Semi-Automatic Pistol – 9×18mm Makarov)

- Fort-12-01 (Ukraine – Semi-Automatic Pistol – 9×18mm Makarov)
- Fort-12-02 (Ukraine – Semi-Automatic Pistol – 9×18mm Makarov)
- Fort-12-03 (Ukraine – Semi-Automatic Pistol – 9×18mm Makarov)
- Fort-12B (Ukraine – Semi-Automatic Pistol – 9×18mm Makarov)
- Fort-12G (Ukraine – Non-Lethal Semi-Automatic Pistol – 9mm Rubber Bullets)
- Fort-12N (Ukraine – Semi-Automatic Pistol – 9×18mm Makarov)
- Fort-12R (Ukraine – Non-Lethal Semi-Automatic Pistol – 9mm Rubber Bullets)
- Fort-12RM (Ukraine – Non-Lethal Semi-Automatic Pistol – 9mm Rubber Bullets)
- Fort-12T (Ukraine – Non-Lethal Semi-Automatic Pistol – 9mm Rubber Bullets)
- Fort-12TM (Ukraine – Non-Lethal Semi-Automatic Pistol – 9mm Rubber Bullets)

Fort-12 CURZ (Ukraine – Semi-Automatic Pistol – 9×17mm CURZ)

- Fort-14 (Ukraine – Semi-Automatic Pistol – 9×18mm Makarov)
- Sokol (Ukraine – Semi-Automatic Pistol – 9×18mm Makarov)
- Fort-17 (Ukraine – Semi-Automatic Pistol – 9×18mm Makarov)
- Fort-17R (Ukraine – Non-Lethal Semi-Automatic Pistol – 9mm Rubber Bullets)
- Fort-17T (Ukraine – Non-Lethal Semi-Automatic Pistol – 9mm Rubber Bullets)
- Fort-17 Curz (Ukraine – Semi-Automatic Pistol – 9×17mm Curz)
- Kobra (Ukraine Semi-Automatic Pistol – 9×18mm Makarov)
- Kordon (Ukraine – Semi-Automatic Pistol .22 LR)
- RPD (Soviet Union – Light Machine Gun – 7.62×39mm)
- RPDM (Soviet Union – Light Machine Gun – 7.62×39mm)
- RPK (Soviet Union – Squad Automatic Weapon – 7.62×39mm)
- RPK-74 (Soviet Union – Squad Automatic Weapon – 5.45×39mm)
- RPK-74M (Soviet Union – Squad Automatic Weapon – 5.45×39mm)
- RPK-74N (Soviet Union – Squad Automatic Weapon – 5.45×39mm)
- RPKS-74 (Soviet Union – Squad Automatic Weapon – 5.45×39mm)
- RPKS-74N (Soviet Union – Squad Automatic Weapon – 5.45×39mm)
- RPK-201 (Soviet Union – Squad Automatic Weapon – 5.56×45mm NATO)
- RPKM (Soviet Union – Squad Automatic Weapon – 7.62×39mm)
- RPKN (Soviet Union – Squad Automatic Weapon – 7.62×39mm)
- RPKS (Soviet Union – Squad Automatic Weapon – 7.62×39mm)
- RPKSN (Soviet Union – Squad Automatic Weapon – 7.62×39mm)
- Vepr (Soviet Union – Semi-Automatic Rifle – 5.45×39mm, 7.62×39mm, 7.62×54mmR, .223 Remington, .30-06 Springfield, .308 Winchester)
- Vepr Shotgun (Soviet Union – Semi-Automatic Shotgun – 12 Gauge, 20 Gauge, .410 Bore)
- Ruby M1915 (Kingdom of Spain – Semi-Automatic Pistol – .32 ACP)
- Ruger
- Machine Guns
- Ruger machine gun (US – Machine Gun – .30-06)
- Pistols
- Ruger 22/45 Mk II (US – Semi-Automatic Pistol – .22 Long Rifle)
- Ruger LCP (US – Semi-Automatic Pistol – .380 ACP)
- Ruger LCP II (US – Semi-Automatic Pistol – .380 ACP)
- Ruger LC9 (US – Semi-Automatic – 9×19mm Parabellum)
- Ruger LC9s (US – Semi-Automatic – 9×19mm Parabellum)
- Ruger LC380 (US – Semi-Automatic – .380 ACP)
- Ruger Mk II (US – Semi-Automatic Pistol – .22 Long Rifle)
- Ruger Mk III (US – Semi-Automatic Pistol – .22 Long Rifle)
- Ruger P Series (US – Semi-Automatic Pistols)
- Ruger P85 (US – Semi-Automatic Pistol – 9×19mm Parabellum)
- Ruger P85 MKII (US – Semi-Automatic Pistol – 9×19mm Parabellum)
- Ruger P89 (US – Semi-Automatic Pistol – 9×19mm Parabellum)
- Ruger P89× (US – Semi-Automatic Pistol – 7.65×21mm Parabellum, 9×19mm Parabellum)
- Ruger P90 (US – Semi-Automatic Pistol – .45 ACP)
- Ruger P91 (US – Semi-Automatic Pistol – .40 S&W)

Ruger P93 (US – Compact Semi-Automatic Pistol – 9×19mm Parabellum)

- Ruger P94 (US – Semi-Compact Semi-Automatic Pistol – 9×19mm Parabellum)
- Ruger P944 (US – Semi-Compact Semi-Automatic Pistol – .40 S&W)
- Ruger P95(US – Semi-Automatic Pistol – 9×19mm Parabellum)
- Ruger P95D (US – Semi-Automatic Pistol – 9×19mm Parabellum)
- Ruger KP95D (US – Semi-Automatic Pistol – 9×19mm Parabellum)
- Ruger P95PR (US – Semi-Automatic Pistol – 9×19mm Parabellum)
- Ruger KP95PR (US – Semi-Automatic Pistol – 9×19mm Parabellum)
- Ruger P97 (US – Semi-Automatic Pistol – .45 ACP)
- Ruger P345 (US – Semi-Automatic Pistol – .45 ACP)
- Ruger KP345 (US – Semi-Automatic Pistol – .45 ACP)
- Ruger P345PR (US – Semi-Automatic Pistol – .45 ACP)
- Ruger SR Series (US – Semi-Automatic Pistols)
- Ruger SR9 (US – Semi-Automatic Pistol – 9×19mm Parabellum)
- Ruger SR9c (US – Compact Semi-Automatic Pistol – 9×19mm Parabellum)
- Ruger SR22 (US – Semi-Automatic Pistol – .22 Long Rifle)
- Ruger SR40 (US – Semi-Automatic Pistol – .40 S&W)
- Ruger SR40c (US – Compact Semi-Automatic Pistol – .40 S&W)
- Ruger SR45 (US – Semi-Automatic Pistol – .45 ACP)
- Revolvers
- Ruger Bisley (US – Single-Action Revolver – .22 Long Rifle, .32 H&R Magnum, .357 S&W Magnum, .38 S&W Special, .41 Remington Magnum, .44 Remington Magnum, .44 S&W Special, .45 Colt)
- Ruger Bisley Vaquero (US – Single-Action Revolver – .22 Long Rifle, .32 H&R Magnum, .357 S&W Magnum, .38 S&W Special, .41 Remington Magnum, .44 Remington Magnum, .44 S&W Special, .45 Colt)
- Ruger Blackhawk (US – Single-Action Revolver – 9×19mm Parabellum, 10mm Auto, .30 Carbine, .32-20 Winchester, .32 H&R Magnum, .327 Federal Magnum, .357 Remington Maximum, .357 S&W Magnum, .38–40 Winchester, .41 Remington Magnum, .44 S&W Special, .44 Remington Magnum, .45 ACP, .45 Colt)
- Ruger New Model Blackhawk (US – Single-Action Revolver)
- Ruger New Model Blackhawk Blued (US – Single-Action Revolver – .30 Carbine, .357 S&W Magnum, .41 Remington Magnum, .44 S&W Special, .45 Colt)
- Ruger New Model Blackhawk Convertible (US – Single-Action Revolver – 9×19mm Parabellum, 10mm Auto, .357 S&W Magnum, .38–40 Winchester, .40 S&W, .45 ACP, .45 Colt)
- Ruger New Model Blackhawk Stainless (US Single-Action Revolver – .327 Federal Magnum, .357 S&W Magnum, .45 Colt)
- Ruger New Model Super Blackhawk (US – Single-Action Revolver – .44 Remington Magnum)
- Ruger GP100 (US – Double-Action Revolver – .327 Federal Magnum, .357 S&W Magnum, .38 S&W Special)
- Ruger LCR – (US – Double-Action Revolver – 9×19mm Parabellum, .22 Long Rifle, .38 Special +P, .357 Magnum)
- Ruger New Model Single-Six (US – Single-Action Revolver – .22 Long Rifle, .32 H&R Magnum)
- Ruger SP101 (US – Double-Action Revolver – 9×19mm Parabellum, .22 Long Rifle, .327 Federal Magnum, .38 S&W Special, .357 S&W Magnum)
- Ruger Redhawk (US – Single-Action Revolver/Double-Action Revolver – .357 S&W Magnum, .38 S&W Special, .41 Remington Magnum, .44 Remington Magnum, .44 S&W Special .45 Colt)
- Ruger Security-Six (US – Double-Action Revolver – .357 S&W Magnum, .38 S&W Special)
- Ruger Service-Six (US – Double-Action Revolver – 9×19mm Parabellum, .357 S&W Magnum, .38 S&W Special)
- Ruger Speed-Six (US – Double-Action Revolver – 9×19mm Parabellum, .357 S&W Magnum, .38 S&W, .38 S&W Special)
- Ruger Super Redhawk (US – Double-Action Revolver – .44 Remington Magnum, .454 Casull, .480 Ruger)
- Ruger Super Redhawk Alaskan (US – Double-Action Revolver – .44 Remington Magnum, .454 Casull, .480 Ruger)
- Rifles
- Ruger American Rifle
- Ruger 10/22(US – Semi-Automatic Rifle – .22 Long Rifle)
- Ruger 10/17(US – Semi-Automatic Rifle – .17 Hornady Magnum Rimfire)
- Ruger 10/22 .22 Magnum(US – Semi-Automatic Rifle – .22 Winchester Magnum Rimfire)
- Ruger 10/22 Carbine(US – Semi-Automatic Carbine – .22 Long Rifle)
- Ruger 10/22 Compact(US – Compact Semi-Automatic Rifle – .22 Long Rifle)
- Ruger 10/22 Sporter(US – Semi-Automatic Carbine – .22 Long Rifle)
- Ruger 10/22 Tactical (US – Compact Semi-Automatic Rifle – .22 Long Rifle)
- Ruger 10/22 Takedown (US – Semi-Automatic Rifle – .22 Long Rifle)
- Ruger 10/22 Target (US – Semi-Automatic Rifle – .22 Long Rifle)
- Ruger Charger Pistol (US – Subcompact Semi-Automatic Rifle – .22 Long Rifle)
- Ruger SR-22 (US – Semi-Automatic Rifle – .22 Long Rifle)
- Ruger VLEH Target Tactical Rifle (US – Semi-Automatic Rifle – .22 Long Rifle)
- Ruger 77 (US – Bolt-Action Rifle – Various)
- Ruger 77/17(US – Bolt-Action Rifle – .17 Hornady Magnum Rimfire, .17 Hornet)
- Ruger 77/22 (US – Bolt-Action Rifle – .22 Hornet, .22 Long Rifle, .22 Winchester Magnum Rimfire)
- Ruger 77/22 HD (US – Bolt-Action Rifle – .22 Hornet, .22 Long Rifle, .22 Winchester Magnum Rimfire)
- Ruger 77/44 (US – Bolt-Action Rifle – .44 Remington Magnum)
- Ruger 77/357 (US – Bolt-Action Rifle – .357 S&W Magnum)
- Ruger Mini-14 (US – Semi-Automatic Rifle – .222 Remington, .223 Remington, 5.56×45mm NATO)
- Ruger AC-556 (US – Assault Rifle – 5.56×45mm NATO)
- Ruger AC-556F (US – Assault Rifle – 5.56×45mm NATO)
- Ruger Mini-6.8 (US – Semi-Automatic Rifle – 6.8×43mm Remington SPC)
- Ruger Mini-14 Bolt-Action Only (US – Straight-Pull Bolt-Action Rifle – .223 Remington, 5.56×45mm NATO)
- Ruger Mini-14 NRA (US – Semi-Automatic Carbine – .223 Remington, 5.56×45mm NATO)
- Ruger Mini-14 Ranch Rifle (US – Semi-Automatic Rifle – .223 Remington, 5.56×45mm NATO)
- Ruger Mini-14 Tactical Rifle (US – Semi-Automatic Carbine – .223 Remington, 5.56×45mm NATO)
- Ruger Mini-14 Target Rifle (US – Semi-Automatic Rifle – .223 Remington)
- Ruger Mini-14/20GB (US – Semi-Automatic Rifle – .223 Remington, 5.56×45mm NATO)
- Ruger Mini-Thirty (US – Semi-Automatic Rifle – 7.62×39mm)
- Ruger XGI (US – Semi-Automatic Rifle – .243 Winchester, .308 Winchester: Prototype)
- Ruger PC9 (US – Semi-Automatic Carbine – 9×19mm Parabellum)
- Ruger PC9 GR(US – Semi-Automatic Carbine – 9×19mm Parabellum)
- Ruger PC4 (US – Semi-Automatic Carbine – .40 S&W)
- Ruger PC4 GR (US – Semi-Automatic Carbine – .40 S&W)
- Shotguns
- Ruger Gold Label (US – Side by Side Shotgun – 12 Gauge)
- Ruger Red Label (US – Over/Under Shotgun – 12 Gauge, 20 Gauge, 28 Gauge)
- Submachine Guns
- Ruger MP9 (US – Submachine Gun – 9×19mm Parabellum)
- Rung Paisarn Heavy Industries
- Rifles
- Rung Paisarn RPS-001 (Kingdom of Thailand, Czech Republic – Assault Rifle – 5.56×45mm NATO: vz. 58 Variant)

== See also ==
- List of firearms by era
  - List of pre-20th century firearms
  - List of World War II firearms
- List of firearms by country
  - List of modern Russian small arms
- Lists of firearms by actions
  - List of blow-forward firearms
  - List of delayed-blowback firearms
- List of firearms by type
  - List of assault rifles
  - List of battle rifles
  - List of carbines
  - List of firearm brands
  - List of flamethrowers
  - List of machine guns
  - List of multiple-barrel firearms
  - List of pistols
  - List of shotguns
  - List of sniper rifles
  - List of submachine guns
- List of firearm cartridges
  - List of handgun cartridges
  - List of rifle cartridges
- List of semi-automatic firearms
  - List of semi-automatic pistols
  - List of semi-automatic rifles
  - List of semi-automatic shotguns
  - List of most-produced firearms
