= M500 =

M500 may refer to:

- Haskins m500, a .50 calibre round sniper rifle
- Mossberg 500, a 12-gauge shotgun
- Smith & Wesson Model 500, a .50 caliber revolver
- Palm m500 series, a 2001 handheld personal digital assistant
- a SoundBridge digital Internet radio model
