= Leupold & Stevens =

American eyewear manufacturer

Leupold & Stevens, Inc.
- Company type: Private
- Industry: Optics and Sporting Goods
- Founded: 1907; 119 years ago in Portland, Oregon, United States
- Headquarters: Beaverton, Oregon, United States; 45.52380°N 122.82243°W
- Key people: Bruce Pettet, CEO
- Revenue: approx. $160 million (2010)
- Number of employees: approx. 700 (Nov. 2010)
- Website: www.leupold.com

Leupold & Stevens, Inc. is an American manufacturer of telescopic sights, red dot sights, binoculars, rangefinders, spotting scopes, and eyewear located in Beaverton, Oregon, United States. The company, started in 1907, is on its fifth generation of family ownership.

== History ==
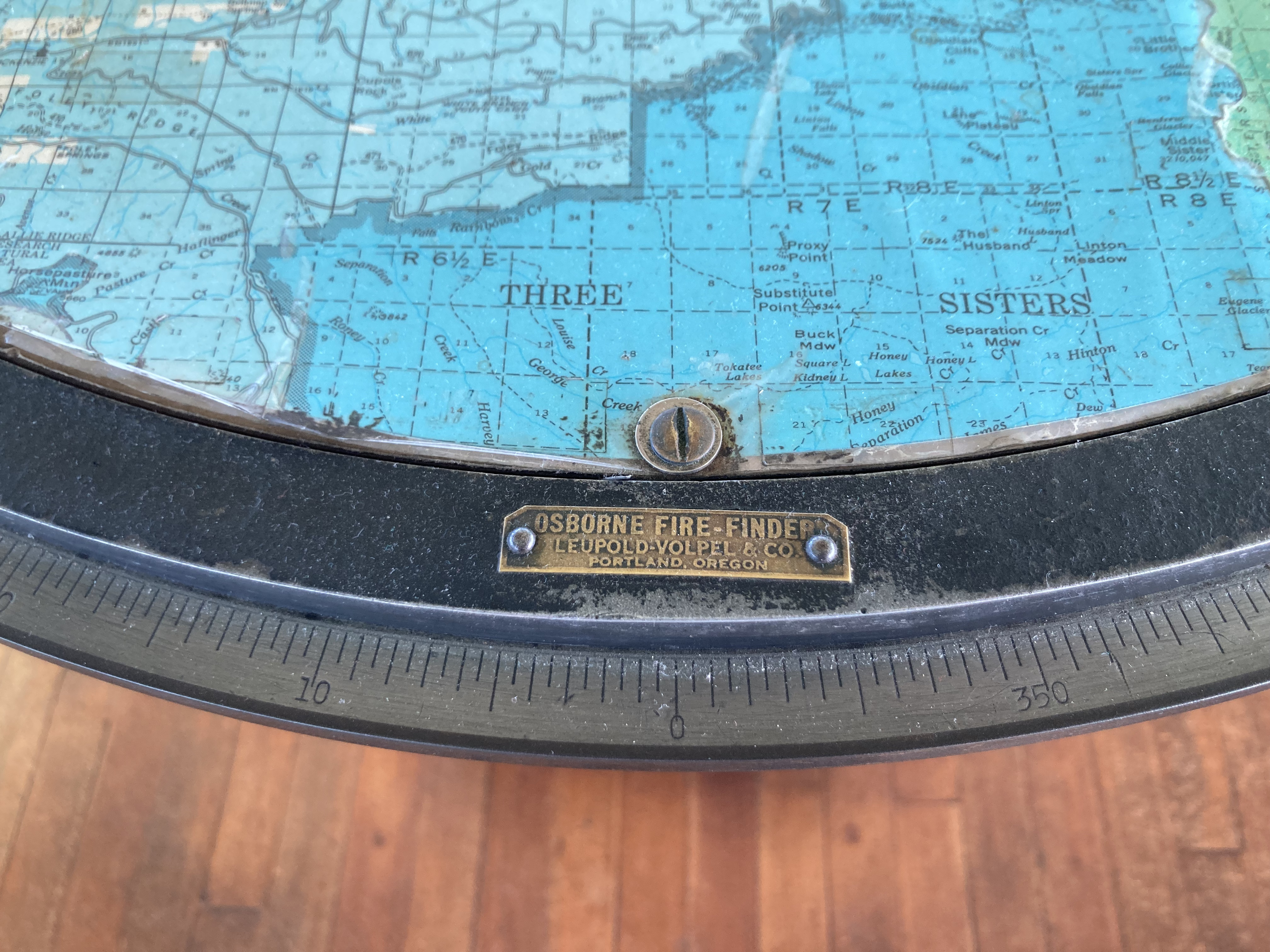
A vintage Osborne Fire Finder produced under the name "Leupold-Volpel & Co."

Leupold & Stevens was founded by the German immigrant Markus Friedrich (Fred) Leupold and his brother-in-law Adam Voelpel in 1907, under the name Leupold & Voelpel. At the time, the company specialized in the repair of survey equipment. In 1911, Leupold & Voelpel was contracted by John Cyprian (J.C.) Stevens to manufacture a water level recorder he had designed and patented. After the initial success of the product, he was made partner in 1914 and the company was renamed Leupold, Voelpel, and Co. Besides the first water level recorder, the company invented several other innovative pieces of equipment, such as the Telemark water recorder which was patented in 1939. This device could transmit water level information via telephone, allowing for remote monitoring of water resources to become feasible.

In 1942, the company name was changed to its present form, Leupold & Stevens. Surveying equipment, rifle scopes, and related products are sold under the "Leupold" name, while water monitoring instrumentation, such as level and flow recorders, are marketed under the "Stevens" brand.

After World War II Leupold & Stevens began making gun scopes after Marcus Leupold failed to hit a deer with his rifle. His scope fogged up and he is reported to have exclaimed "Hell! I could build a better scope than this!" as the deer bounded off. In 1962, Leupold invented the Duplex Reticle, which most riflescopes now use. By 1979, Leupold scopes were generating twice the total revenue of Stevens instruments.

In 1969, the company acquired a majority interest in the company Nosler Bullets (also a family company), and then sold off their portion in 1988. Other ventures include Biamp Systems (1985–1986), makers of sound equipment, and Fabmark (1984–1990), a sheet metal fabrication division that serviced high technology companies.

By 1996, the company had sales of $100 million. In 1998, the water monitoring portion of Leupold & Stevens was spun off into its own privately held Portland-based business, Stevens Water Monitoring Systems, inc., with Leupold & Stevens also retaining the "Stevens" name as part of their corporate identity. In 2002, Leupold & Stevens won a Wausau Insurance Gold Award for workplace safety at the company's factory. By 2006, the company employed 600 people at its Beaverton facility. The company is now in its fifth generation of ownership.

In 2008, Leupold & Stevens purchased Redfield Optics along with its brand name and all intellectual property rights. In 2010, the company added almost 100 employees, bringing total employment to almost 700 by November of that year. In late 2010, a Portland Business Journal article gave the company's annual revenue as approximately $160 million, citing Reference.com for the estimate.

A new chief executive, Bruce Pettet, was named in February 2014. The 2014 NRA National Championship equipment survey listed Leupold as the most popular scope manufacturer for both the high power and high power hunter competition.

== Products ==
Leupold currently produces telescopic sights, red dot sights, binoculars, rangefinders, spotting scopes, and eyewear products in addition to scope mounts, apparel, and accessories. In 2020, Leupold launched a virtual factory tour.

=== Riflescopes ===
- VX-6HD
- VX-5HD
- VX-3i LRP
- VX-3i
- VX-Freedom
- FX Series (fixed power)
- Competition
- Rifleman
- Mark 8
- Mark 6
- Mark 5HD
- D-EVO

=== Red dot sights ===
- Freedom Red Dot Sight (RDS)
- Leupold Carbine Optic (LCO)
- DeltaPoint Pro

=== Binoculars ===
- BX-5 Santiam HD
- BX-4 Pro Guide HD
- BX-T HD
- BX-2 Alpine
- BX-1 McKenzie
- BX-1 Yosemite
- BX-1 Rogue

=== Spotting scopes ===
- SX-5 Santiam HD
- SX-4 Pro Guide HD
- Gold Ring
- Mark 4
- SX-2 Alpine HD
- SX-1 Ventana

=== Rangefinders ===
- RX-2800
- RX-1600i
- RX-1300i
- RX-FullDraw4
- RX-FullDraw3
- RX-950

=== Mounts ===
- Standard (STD)
- Dual Dovetail (DD)
- Quick Release (QR)
- Cross Slot (PRW2/QRW2/LRW)
- Backcountry
- Ringmounts
- Mark 4
- Integrated Mounting System (IMS)
- Rifleman
- DeltaPoint

=== Eyewear ===
- Tracer
- Packout
- Becnara
- Katmai
- Switchback
- Payload
- Refuge
- Cheyenne

== Military contracts ==
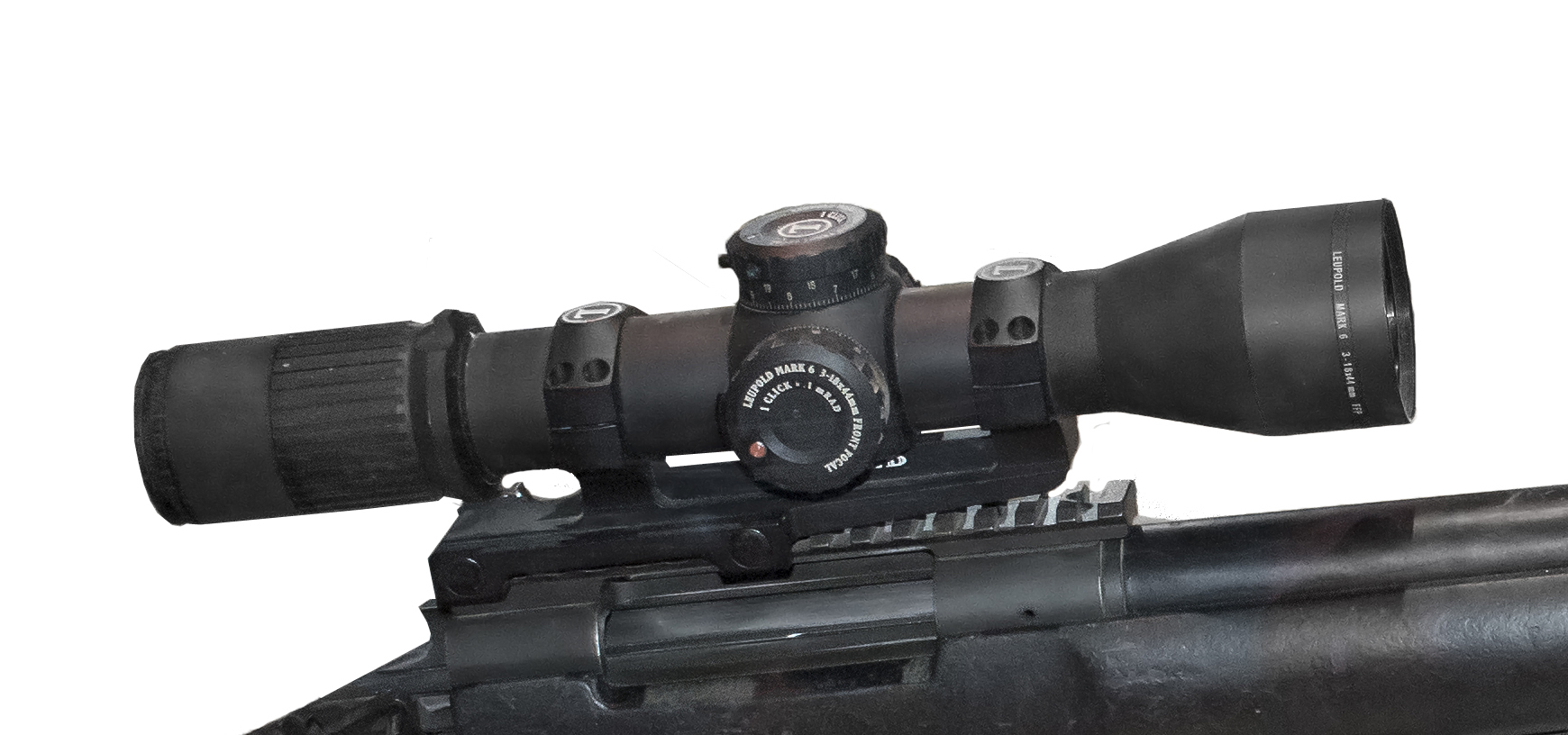
Leupold and Stevens Mark 6 scope with variable magnification 3-18x44mm, mounted on a M24 SWS.

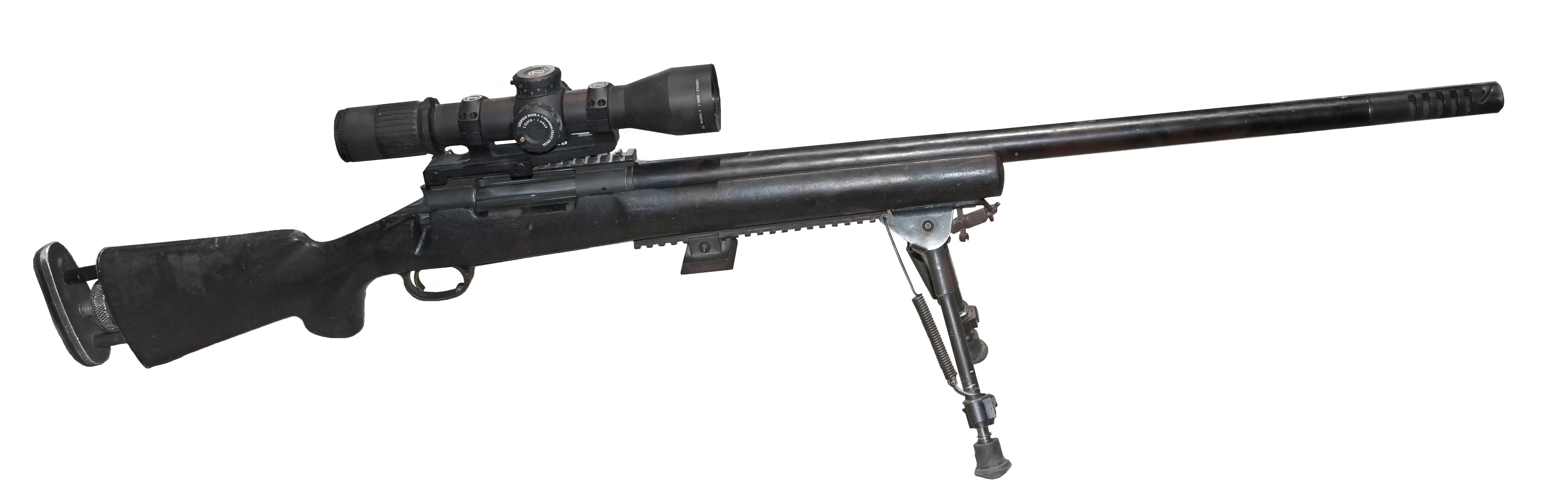
IDF M24 SWS with Leupold Mark 6 3-18x44mm sniper scope.

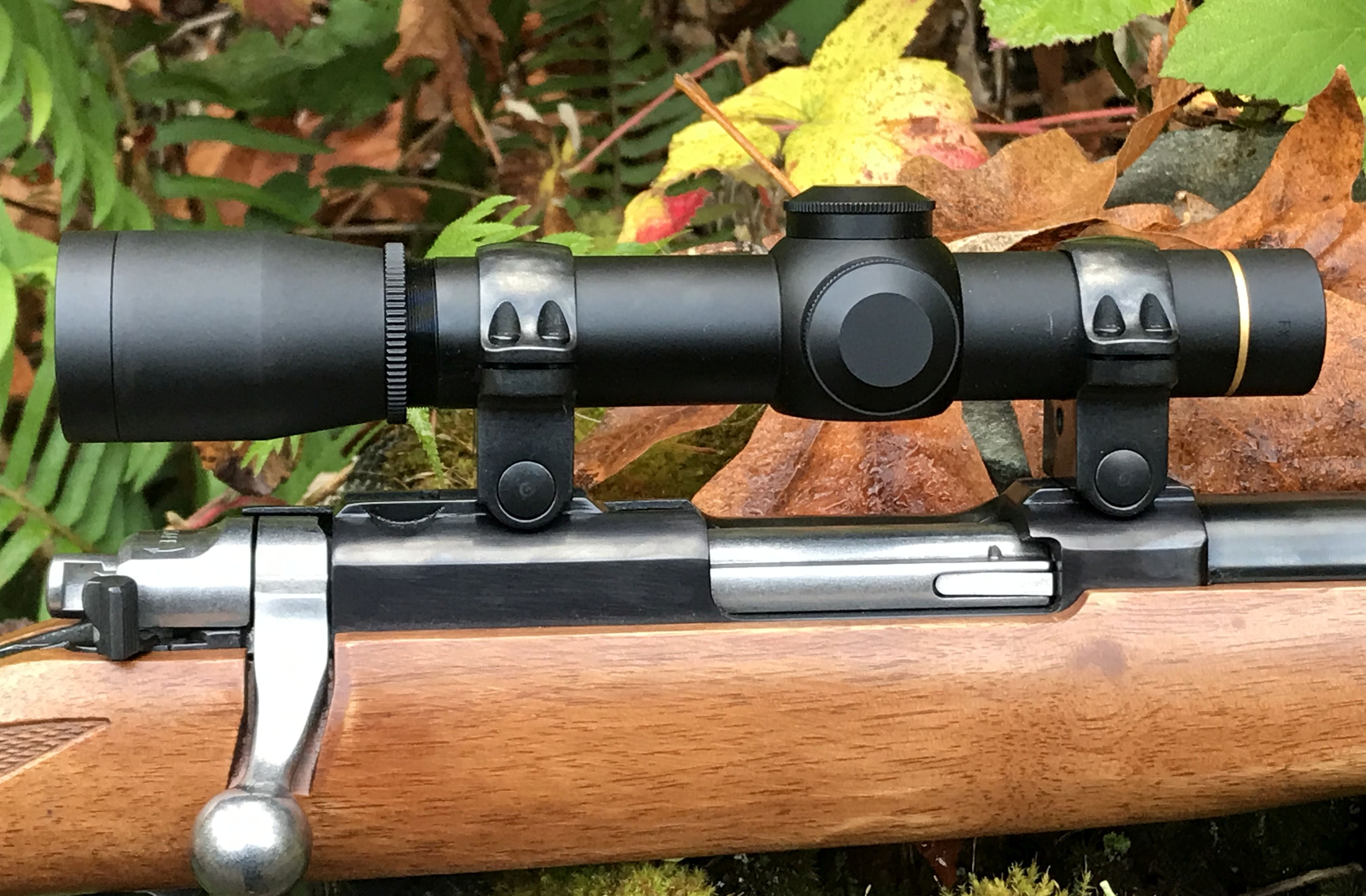
Leupold FX-II Ultralight scope on a Ruger 77/44.

The company's riflescopes are used by organizations such as the United States Army, the Secret Service and the Navy SEALs. The United States Navy and the Marine Corps also use their scopes.

- 1988–2014 | M24
- 1989–present | M107 – Mark 4 LR/T 4.5-14x50mm
- 2002–present | MK12 Special Purpose Rifle (SPR) – Mark 4 MR/T 2.5-8x36mm TS-30 A2
- 2004–present | MK14 Enhanced Battle Rifle – Mark 4 LR/T 3.5-10x40mm
- 2008–2019 | M110 Semi-Automatic Sniper System – Mark 4 LR/T 3.5-10x40mm
- 2010–present | M151 Scout Sniper Observation Telescopes (SSOT) – Mark 4 12-40X60mm Spotting Scope
- 2010–present | M2010 – Mark 4 ER/T 6.5-20x50mm M5A2
- 2011–present | Classified – Mark 8 1.1-8x24mm CQBSS
- 2011–present | Heavy Day Optic (HDO) – Mark 8 1.1-8x24mm CQBSS
- 2013–present | Enhanced Combat Optical Sight-Optimized (ECOS-O) – Mark 6 3-18x44mm
- 2020–present | M110 Semi-Automatic Sniper System – Mark 5HD 3.6-18x44
- 2020–present | MK22 Mod 0 Precision Sniper Rifle – Mark 5HD 5-25x56

== See also ==
- List of companies based in Oregon
