= Ruger Model 77 rotary magazine =

Ruger 77-Series Bolt-Action Rifles
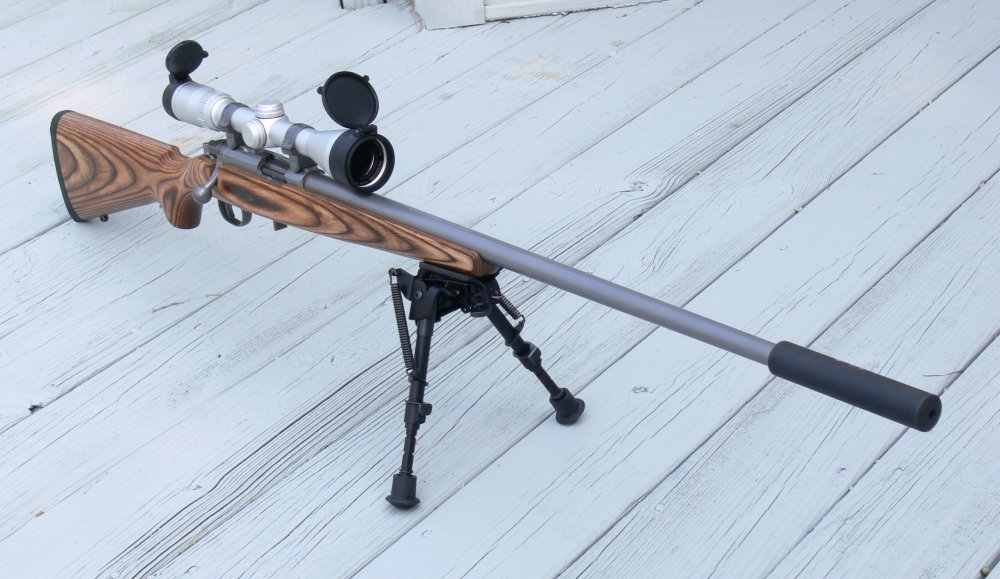
- Ruger 77/22 with scope and bipod
- Type: Bolt-action rifle
- Place of origin: United States

Production history
- Manufacturer: Sturm, Ruger & Co.
- Produced: 1983-Present
- Variants: see Variants

Specifications
- Mass: 5.25–7.5 lb (2.38–3.40 kg)
- Length: 38.5–43.25 in (97.8–109.9 cm)
- Barrel length: 18.5–24 in (47–61 cm)
- Cartridge: .17 Hornet, .17 HMR, .17 WSM (77/17).22LR, .22 WMR, .22 Hornet (77/22).357 Magnum (77/357).44 Magnum (77/44)
- Action: Bolt-action
- Feed system: Rotary magazine capacity: 4+1 (.44 Mag); 5+1 (.357 Mag); 6+1 (.17 WSM, .17 Hornet, .22 Hornet); 9+1 (.22 WMRF, .17 HMR); 10+1 (.22 LR)

The Ruger 77/22 is a bolt-action rimfire rifle chambered for the .22 Long Rifle, .22 WMR, or .22 Hornet. It has a removable rotary magazine which allows the magazine to fit flush with the bottom of the stock. The 77/22 was introduced in 1983 and was based on the centerfire Model 77 Mark II. Each rifle comes with scope rings and a lock.

== Variants ==
=== 77/17 ===
The Ruger 77/17 uses the same rotary magazine design with a short bolt stroke and three position safety but is chambered in .17 HMR, .17 Winchester Super Magnum and .17 Hornet. Unlike other models, the 77/17 does not have sights.

RUGER 77/17 Variants
Caliber	Stock	Finish	Length		Weight	Magazine capacity	MSRP
Caliber	Stock	Finish	Barrel	Overall	Weight	Magazine capacity	MSRP
.17 Hornet	Green Mountain	Target Grey	24 in (61 cm)	43.25 in (109.9 cm)	7.5 lb (3.4 kg)	6+1	$929
.17 HMR	American Walnut	Blued	22 in (56 cm)	41.25 in (104.8 cm)	6.5 lb (2.9 kg)	9+1	$829
.17 HMR	Black Laminate	Target Grey	24 in (61 cm)	43.25 in (109.9 cm)	7.5 lb (3.4 kg)	9+1	$929
.17 WSM	American Walnut	Matte Stainless	24 in (61 cm)	43.25 in (109.9 cm)	7.5 lb (3.4 kg)	6+1	$999

=== 77/22 ===
The 77/22 comes in multiple different configurations and can be chambered for .22 LR, .22 WMR and .22 Hornet. All models come without sights and are either alloy steel (if blued) or stainless steel.

RUGER 77/22 Variants
Caliber	Stock	Finish	Length		Weight	Magazine capacity	MSRP
Caliber	Stock	Finish	Barrel	Overall	Weight	Magazine capacity	MSRP
.22 LR	Walnut	Blued	20 in (51 cm)	39.25 in (99.7 cm)	6.5 lb (2.9 kg)	10+1	$829
.22 LR	Synthetic	Brushed Stainless	20 in (51 cm)	39.25 in (99.7 cm)	6 lb (2.7 kg)	10+1	$829
.22 LR	Brown Laminate	Target Grey	24 in (61 cm)	43.25 in (109.9 cm)	7.5 lb (3.4 kg)	10+1	$929
.22 WMR	Walnut	Blued	20 in (51 cm)	39.25 in (99.7 cm)	6.5 lb (2.9 kg)	9+1	$829
.22 WMR	Synthetic	Brushed Stainless	20 in (51 cm)	39.25 in (99.7 cm)	6 lb (2.7 kg)	9+1	$829
.22 WMR	Brown Laminate	Target Grey	20 in (51 cm)	39.25 in (99.7 cm)	7.5 lb (3.4 kg)	9+1	$929
.22 Hornet	Walnut	Blued	20 in (51 cm)	39.25 in (99.7 cm)	6.5 lb (2.9 kg)	6+1	$829
.22 Hornet	Green Mountain	Target Grey	24 in (61 cm)	43.25 in (109.9 cm)	7.5 lb (3.4 kg)	6+1	$929

=== 77/357 ===
The Ruger 77/357 uses the same rotary magazine design with a short bolt stroke and three position safety but is chambered in .357 Magnum. It features an adjustable rear sight and a gold bead front sight.

RUGER 77/357 Variants
Caliber	Stock	Finish	Length		Weight	Magazine capacity	MSRP
Caliber	Stock	Finish	Barrel	Overall	Weight	Magazine capacity	MSRP
.357 Mag	Black Synthetic	Brushed Stainless	18.5 in (47 cm)	38.5 in (98 cm)	5.5 lb (2.5 kg)	5+1	$829

=== 77/44 ===
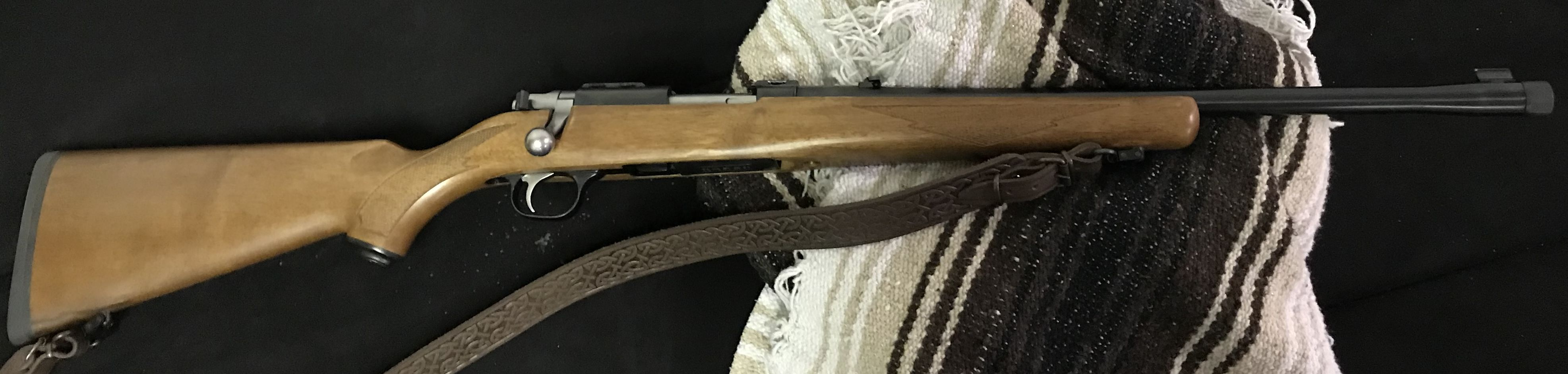
A Ruger 77/44 carbine. This variant has a walnut stock and a threaded barrel.

A 4-round rotary magazine (right) along with an aftermarket 10-round box magazine (left) for the Ruger 77/44.

Introduced in 1997, the Ruger 77/44 uses the same rotary magazine design with a short bolt stroke and three position safety but is chambered in .44 Magnum.

RUGER 77/44 Variants
Caliber	Stock	Finish	Length		Weight	Magazine capacity	MSRP
Caliber	Stock	Finish	Barrel	Overall	Weight	Magazine capacity	MSRP
.44 Mag	Vista Camo	Brushed Stainless	18.5 in (47 cm)	38.5 in (98 cm)	5.25 lb (2.38 kg)	4+1	$849
.44 Mag	Black Synthetic	Brushed Stainless	18.5 in (47 cm)	38.5 in (98 cm)	5.25 lb (2.38 kg)	4+1	$829
