= Remington Model 580 =

- Type: Sporting and target rifle
- Place of origin: United States

Production history
- Manufacturer: Remington
- Produced: 1967–1999
- No. built: 580 = 60,000; 581 = 60,000; 582 = 90,708
- Variants: 581, 581S, 582

Specifications
- Cartridge: .22 Long Rifle
- Action: Bolt-Action
- Feed system: 580 = Single Shot; 581 = Box Magazine; 582 - Tubular Magazine
- Sights: Iron sights, grooved receiver for scope

The Remington Model 580, 581, and 582 are a family of bolt-action rifles, manufactured from 1967 to 1999. The rifles were introduced as a replacement for the previous Model 511. The 580 series was a lower-cost rifle patterned after the contemporary Model 788 centerfire rifle and shares that rifle's rear-locking bolt.
