= Remington Model 770 =

- Type: Bolt-action rifle
- Place of origin: United States

Production history
- Designer: Remington R&D
- Manufacturer: Remington Arms
- Produced: 2007–2019
- Variants: Model 770 Compact; Model 770 Stainless

Specifications
- Mass: 8.5 lb (3.9 kg)
- Length: 42.5 in (108 cm) (standard); 44.5 in (113 cm) (magnum)
- Barrel length: 22 in (56 cm) (standard); 24 in (61 cm) (magnum)
- Cartridge: .243 Winchester; .270 Winchester; 7mm-08 Remington; 7 mm Remington Magnum; 30-06 Springfield; .308 Winchester; .300 Winchester Magnum
- Action: Bolt action
- Feed system: 4-round detachable mag (standard); 3-round detachable mag (magnum)

The Remington model 770 is a magazine-fed bolt-action rifle marketed as a lower cost alternative to the popular model 700 and is manufactured in several sporting cartridges. Remington Arms produces various low cost alternatives to its flagship Model 700 including the Remington 788 and earlier Remington 710 on which the Model 770 is based.

== Design ==
The Remington model 770 is a magazine fed, bolt action, center-fire rifle. The 770 is available in 243 Win, 270 Win, 7mm-08 Rem, 7mm Rem Mag, 30-06 Sprg, 300 Win Mag, and 308 Win. The standard, factory magazine can hold up to 4 rounds (3 rounds in the magnum version) plus 1 loaded directly into the chamber. The factory model includes a mounted, boresighted 3-9x40mm scope that comes sighted in to hit a target at 100 yards. It is available in black, synthetic composite, various real tree composite designs, and original wooden stocks.
