= Remington Model 572 Fieldmaster =

- Type: Rifle
- Place of origin: United States

Production history
- Manufacturer: Remington Arms
- Produced: 1955–2020
- Variants: see variants

Specifications
- Mass: 5.8 lb (2.6 kg)
- Length: 40 in (100 cm)
- Barrel length: 22.75 in (57.8 cm) or 21.00 in (53.3 cm)
- Cartridge: .22 Short.22 Long.22 LR
- Action: pump action
- Feed system: Under-barrel tube magazine: 20-shot (22 Short); 17-shot (22 Long); 15-shot (22 LR)
- Sights: Ramped front, open rear.

The Remington Model 572 Fieldmaster is a slide action, manually operated .22 caliber (rimfire) repeating rifle manufactured by Remington Arms Company. First announced as a new model in 1954, the 572 Fieldmaster rifle incorporates a tubular magazine capable of feeding .22 Short, .22 Long, or .22 Long Rifle rimfire cartridges, a cross-bolt safety, and an aluminum receiver grooved for scope mounts. The original Fieldmaster used a 22.75-inch barrel. The Model 572 uses many of the design features first introduced on the Remington Model 870 shotgun, and replaced the Model 121 Fieldmaster as the company's slide-action rimfire repeater. The 572 was discontinued in 2020 following the bankruptcy of the parent company.

== Operation ==
The 572 is a manual slide-operated .22 rimfire rifle. Weighing in at 5 pounds with an aluminum receiver, the rifle uses a moving forearm connected directly to the bolt for positive chambering and extraction regardless of rimfire cartridge length, and will fire .22 Short, Long, or Long Rifle cartridges interchangeably.

== Variants ==
Model 572A Fieldmaster
The Model 572A Fieldmaster was sold from 1956 through 1988; it had a 22.75 in (57.8 cm) barrel, an uncheckered hardwood pistol-grip stock. and a grooved forearm.
Model 572SB
Sold between 1961 and 1979, the 572SB featured an unrifled smoothbore barrel intended for .22LR shot cartridges. It was otherwise the same as the 572A.
Model 572 BDL
In 1966, Remington introduced the BDL or "Deluxe" rifle to supplement the 572A and 572SB. The BDL featured a ramp front sight with gold bead, a fully adjustable rear sight modeled after the sight used on Remington 700 big-game rifle, and a higher-grade walnut forearm and straight-comb butt stock with impressed checkering. In 1991, the walnut butt stock of the BDL Deluxe version was altered to incorporate a Monte Carlo comb to improve cheek weld when using the rifle with a telescopic sight, and the impressed checkering was altered to machine-cut checkering. In 2017, after complaints that the high Monte Carlo comb made the rifle difficult to use with open sights, Remington returned to a straight comb butt stock design for current production BDL rifles, until production ended in 2020.
