= Remington Model 572 =

Remington model 572 Fieldmaster
- Type: Pump-action rifle
- Place of origin: United States

Production history
- Designed: 1954
- Manufacturer: Remington Arms Company
- Produced: 1954 – c. 2020

Specifications
- Mass: 5 lbs
- Barrel length: 21 in (530 mm)
- Crew: rifling twist rate = 1 in 16
- Cartridge: .22 Long Rifle, .22 Short, .22 Long
- Action: Pump action
- Feed system: Tubular Magazine, 15 to 22 rounds, depending on cartridge

The Remington Model 572 Fieldmaster is a manually-operated, slide-action rimfire repeating rifle manufactured by the Remington Arms Company. The 572 is noted for its similarity to the Remington 870 shotgun in design. The 572 is chambered for the .22 Short, .22 Long and .22 Long Rifle cartridges. Ammunition is supplied by a tubular magazine under the barrel which holds 15-22 cartridges depending upon type.

== History and design ==
The 572 (later renamed 572A) Fieldmaster was first introduced as a forthcoming .22 rimfire rifle in December 1954 as a successor to the Remington Model 121. Weighing in at 5 pounds with an aluminum receiver and hardwood stock, the 572 used a sliding forearm connected directly to the bolt for positive chambering and extraction. The rifle will chamber .22 Short, Long, or Long Rifle cartridges interchangeably. The hammer is contained within the action and ejection is through the side. The top of the receiver is grooved for scope mounting.

A lightweight version of the Fieldmaster, the 572BT "Buckskin Tan" was introduced in 1957. Remington was able to shave 1 pound from the total weight of the M572A by substituting aluminium to manufacture the trigger guard, buttplate, and even the barrel (although the latter incorporates a steel rifled insert). The rifle was also briefly available in two other color schemes: "Crow Wing Black" (CWB), and "Teal-wing Blue"(TWB). The M572TWB was discontinued in 1960 and the M572BT and M572CWB were last offered in 1962.

A smoothbore version of the rifle, the 572SB, was available from 1962 to 1979.

In 1966, Remington introduced the BDL or "Deluxe" Fieldmaster. The BDL featured a ramp front sight with gold bead, a fully adjustable rear sight modeled after the sight used on Remington 700 big-game rifle, and a higher-grade walnut forearm and straight-comb butt stock with impressed checkering. After 34 years of production, the standard model 572A was discontinued in 1988.

In 1991, the walnut butt stock of the BDL Deluxe version was altered to incorporate a Monte Carlo comb to improve cheek weld when using the rifle with a telescopic sight, and the impressed checkering was altered to machine-cut checkering.

In 2017, after complaints that the Monte Carlo comb made the rifle difficult to use with open sights, Remington returned to a straight comb stock design for current production BDL rifles. The 572 BDL was discontinued in 2020 with the bankruptcy of Remington Arms Co. LLC, ending all production of the Fieldmaster.
