= Remington Nylon 66 =

Semi-automatic rifle

Nylon 66
- Type: Semi-automatic rifle
- Place of origin: United States

Production history
- Designer: W.E. Leek, C.H. Morse, H.W. Young
- Produced: 1959–1989
- No. built: 1,050,350
- Variants: see variants

Specifications
- Mass: 4 lb (1.8 kg)
- Length: 38.5 in (98 cm)
- Cartridge: .22 LR
- Barrels: 19.5 in (50 cm)
- Action: Semi-automatic
- Feed system: 14 round tubular magazine

The Remington Nylon 66 was a rifle manufactured by Remington Arms from 1959 to 1989. It was one of the earliest mass-produced rifles to feature a stock made from a material other than wood. Previously the 22-410 Stevens Arms combination gun had been offered with a Tenite stock. The firearms market generally lacked experience with synthetic stocks, making the Nylon 66 a risky gamble for Remington. The model name was taken from the polymer of the same name.

== History ==
In the 1950s, Remington Arms was interested in designing a rifle that was cheaper to produce. After analysis, engineers determined that there were savings to be found in the production of the receivers and stocks of rifles. Thus Remington asked chemical engineers at DuPont to come up with a plastic that could replace both the wooden stock and the receiver. The specs given to DuPont called for a material that could be formed into any shape desired but that also had a high tensile impact and flexural strength.

After some research, DuPont came back to Remington with a compound they called Zytel 101. Zytel is DuPont's brand name for nylon resins. This compound was ultimately used to produce the stock and receiver. After the Nylon 66 proved to be successful, Remington also marketed a series of bolt-action and lever-action rifles using Nylon stocks.

== Design and features ==
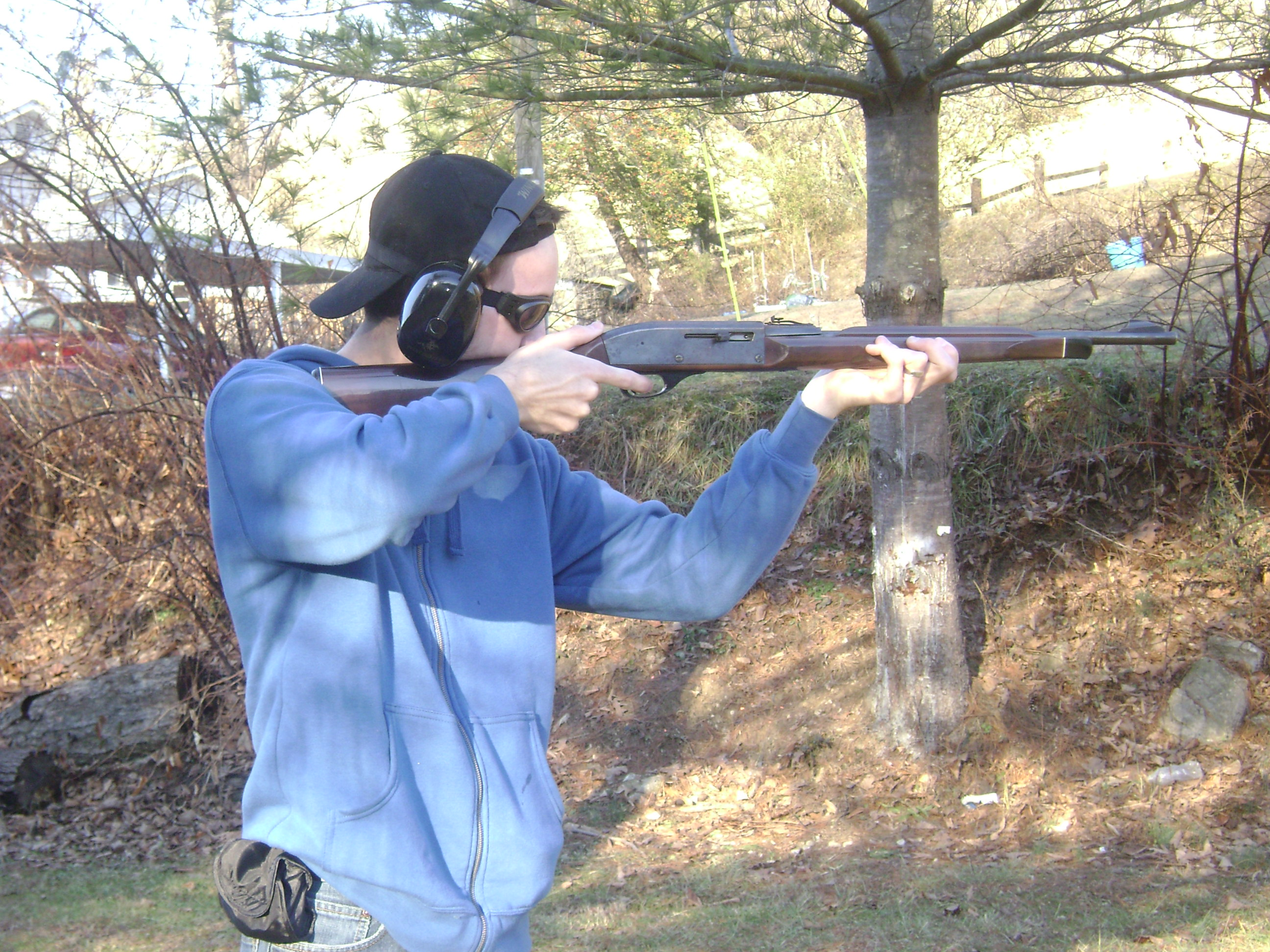
Remington Nylon 66 cycling.

The largely synthetic construction meant that the Nylon 66 could operate without any added lubricants. This made it popular in arctic regions, and indeed there have been many reports of indigenous peoples killing large animals, such as moose, with a .22 LR fired from a Nylon 66.

The Nylon 66 was fitted with leaf sights and a grooved receiver that could accommodate a mount for a telescopic sight. It was available in several colors, such as "Mohawk Brown", "Apache Black", and "Seneca Green".

The 77 Apache version has a bright green stock and was sold by K-Mart. The Seneca Green is a dull colored green and, in some lighting conditions, Seneca Green is difficult to distinguish from the more common brown. This version was also made with a detachable 10-round magazine which, in contrast to the standard version, was often unreliable. FIE of Brazil also made a copy of the tube magazine model, but many of these had quality control issues. The standard U.S.-made tube magazine model could reliably cycle hundreds of rounds without cleaning, provided high-velocity ammunition was used.

Below are some production numbers to assist with the rarity of each model:

Model	Number produced
Nylon 66 Gallery Special	Unknown
Nylon 66 150th Anniversary	3,792
Nylon 66 Bicentennial	10,268
Nylon 77	15,000
Nylon 66 Seneca Green	42,500
Apache 77 aka Kmart Nylon	54,000
Nylon 66 Black Diamond	56,000
Nylon 10C	128,000
Nylon 66 Apache Black	221,000
Nylon 66 Mohawk Brown	716,492

== Variants ==
Nylon 66MB: Mohawk Brown, 1959–1987 (Brown stock, blue steel receiver/barrel)

Nylon 66GS: Gallery Special 1962–1981 (.22 Short only, Brown stock, blue steel receiver/barrel). Shell deflector. Counter cable attachment on bottom of stock. A few were known to have been Apache Black.

Nylon 66SG: Seneca Green, 1959–1962 (dark green stock, blue steel receiver/barrel) 42,500 made

Nylon 66AB: Apache Black, 1962–1984 (Black stock, chrome receiver & barrel) 221,000 made.

Nylon 66BD: Black Diamond 1978–1987 (Black stock, blue/black steel barrel and receiver cover)

Remington began numbering this model in 1967. Serial numbers for 1967 ran from 410000-419011. For 1968 the numbers ran from 419012–473710. These 1967–1968 serial numbers were located on the bottom of the barrel, about 3" back from the muzzle.

After 1968 serial numbers were located on the left-hand side of the Nylon 66 stamped metal receiver cover.

== Users ==
- Bolivia: Used by Bolivian Police Forces.
