= .17 Hornet =

Rifle cartridge

.17 Hornet (Ackley)
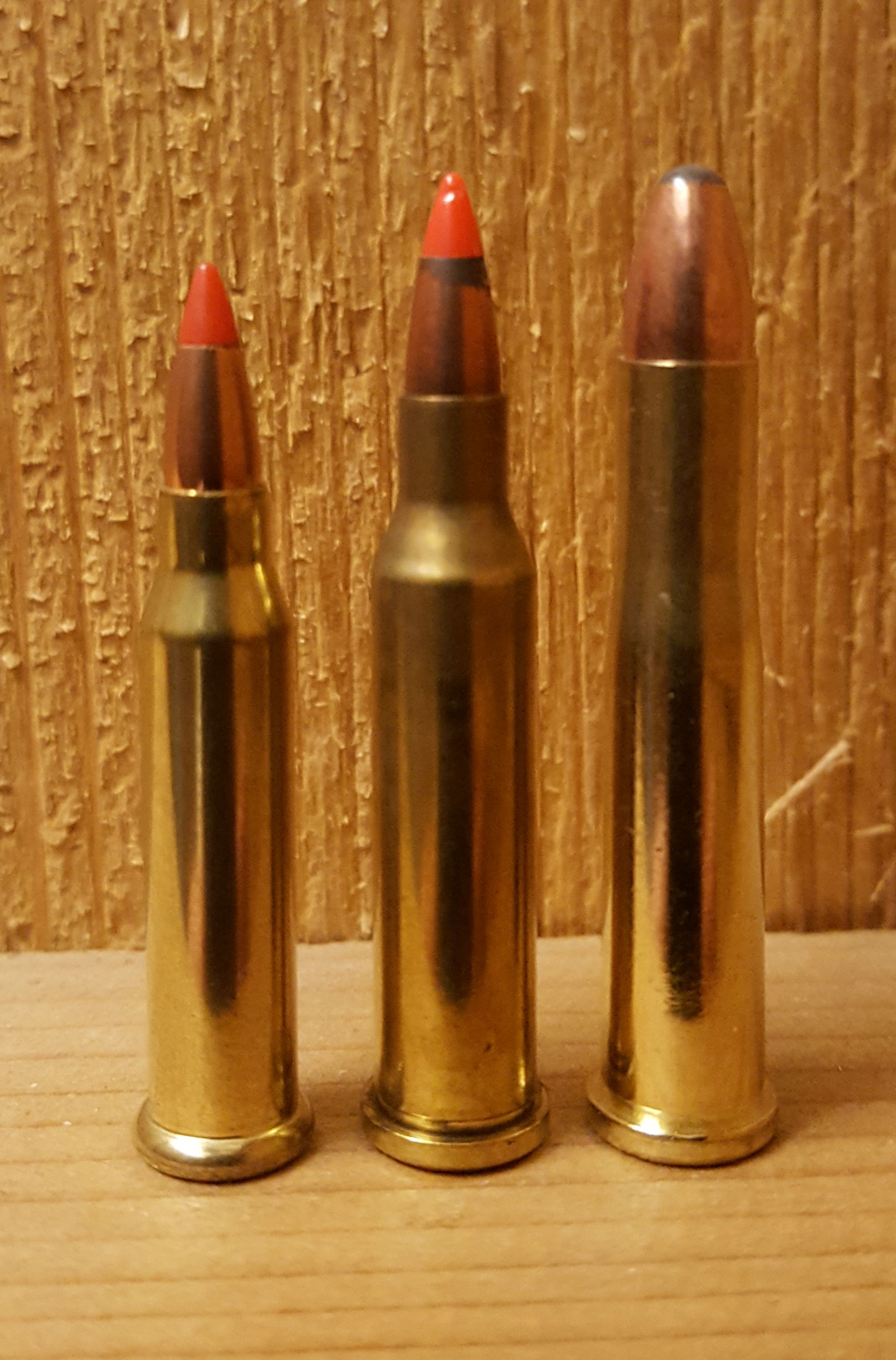
- Hornady version (center), between .17 Winchester Super Magnum (left) and .22 Hornet (right)
- Type: Rifle
- Place of origin: United States

Production history
- Designer: P.O. Ackley
- Designed: early 1950s
- Manufacturer: Hornady

Specifications
- Parent case: .22 Hornet
- Case type: Rimmed, bottleneck
- Bullet diameter: .172 in (4.4 mm)
- Neck diameter: .193 in (4.9 mm)
- Shoulder diameter: .288 in (7.3 mm)
- Base diameter: .299 in (7.6 mm)
- Rim diameter: .350 in (8.9 mm)
- Rim thickness: .065 in (1.7 mm)
- Case length: 1.350 in (34.3 mm)
- Overall length: 1.723 in (43.8 mm)
- Rifling twist: 1-10
- Primer type: Small rifle
- Maximum pressure (SAAMI): 50,000 psi (340 MPa)

Ballistic performance
Bullet mass/type	Velocity	Energy
20 gr. (1.3 g) BT	3,515 ft/s (1,071 m/s)	548.8 ft⋅lbf (744.1 J)
25 gr. (1.6 g) HP	3,176 ft/s (968 m/s)	560 ft⋅lbf (760 J)
30 gr. (1.9 g) HP	2,975 ft/s (907 m/s)	589.7 ft⋅lbf (799.5 J)

The .17 Hornet / 4.4x34mmR is a .17 caliber centerfire rifle cartridge originally offered as a "wildcat cartridge" developed by P.O. Ackley in the early 1950s. He created this non-factory (wildcat) offering by simply necking-down the .22 Hornet to .17 caliber and fire forming the resized cases in his new chamber design. The result was a small, quiet cartridge capable of high velocity. Ackley mentions it as one of the most balanced of the .17 cartridges of his time; likely, this is still true.

Sixty years later, the Hornady Manufacturing Company (Grand Island, Nebraska, US) turned Ackley's idea into a commercial product with a similar cartridge; the .17 Hornady Hornet uses a 20 gr (1.3 g) "Superformance" V-max projectile with a published velocity of 3,650 ft/s (1,110 m/s).

However, the new standardized ammunition and brass is not built to exactly the same dimensional specifications as the original wildcat or the dimensions listed on this page. Hornady's standard has a shorter body with less taper and shorter overall case length while the overall loaded length remains that of the original .22 Hornet (in order to fit the standard Hornet magazines). Shooters using the .17 Hornady Hornet in a .17 Ackley Hornet chamber will experience the bullet jumping to the rifling and losing some of the inherent accuracy for which the cartridge has been known.

It has been reported the .17 Hornady Hornet uses a thicker rim than the original Hornet case. However, the ninth edition of the Hornady Handbook of Cartridge Reloading shows them to be the same .065 in (1.7 mm); measuring the rims of actual factory cases shows the Hornady handbook to be correct. Moreover, Ackley's Pocket Manual for Shooters and Reloaders shows the rim thickness for his wildcat to range between .063 and .069 in (1.6 and 1.8 mm), which is consistent with the Hornady handbook. Both cartridges headspace on this rim.

While the Ackley cartridge uses a 30-degree shoulder angle and the Hornady is 25 degrees, its longer shoulder is accommodated by Ackley's longer case body. Fireforming moves the Hornady's shoulder forward at the expense of neck length.

There is another size issue: according to Ackley's manual, his wildcat cartridge is only .289 in (7.3 mm) over the shoulder while the Hornady factory round measures .294 in (7.5 mm). This is the reason the Hornady's case capacity is almost identical to that of Ackley's. Since there is five-thousandths less taper in the case body, the new .17 Hornady Hornet cases may not fit an Ackley chamber without full-length resizing.

Existing rifles chambered for the Ackley wildcat can have their barrels set back one turn and rechambered to the new .17 Hornady Hornet, which meets the Sporting Arms and Ammunition Manufacturers' Institute (SAAMI) standard for the .17 Hornet. This fixes the bullet jump issue and improves ammunition availability with little risk of diminished performance.

== See also ==
- List of firearms
- List of handgun cartridges
- List of rifle cartridges
- List of rimmed cartridges
- Table of handgun and rifle cartridges
