= Remington Model 710 =

Model 710
- Type: Bolt-action rifle
- Place of origin: United States

Production history
- Designer: Remington Arms
- Designed: 2001
- Manufacturer: Remington Arms
- Produced: 2001–2006

Specifications
- Mass: 7.125 lb (3.2 kg)
- Length: 42.5 in (1,080 mm)
- Caliber: .243 Winchester; .270 Winchester; .30-06 Springfield; 7mm Remington Magnum; .300 Winchester Magnum
- Action: Bolt action
- Feed system: Detachable double-stack box magazine
- Sights: Integrated scope mount rail

The Remington Model 710 is a bolt-action rifle manufactured by Remington Arms from 2001 to 2006 at their manufacturing plant in Mayfield, Kentucky, and based on their popular Model 700.

The Model 710 uses centerfire ammunition, a 3-lug bolt system — as opposed to the 700's dual opposed locking lugs — and a 4-round detachable magazine for all chamberings except for 7mm Remington Magnum and .300 Winchester Magnum, which use a 3-round detachable magazine. All can be equipped with a bipod and sling, and comes equipped with a gray or olive drab synthetic stock, and a mounted Bushnell Sharpshooter 3–9×40mm scope which is bore-sighted from the factory.

The 710 was heavily criticized, however, because of the polymer receiver, which was replaced with a steel one in the final production year.

The 710 was discontinued in 2006, being significantly improved and relaunched as the Remington Model 770 the following year.

== Recall ==
There was a recall for the 710, between July and October 2002, for improperly made safety detent springs.
