= .17 Winchester Super Magnum =

American rimfire rifle cartridge

17 Winchester Super Magnum
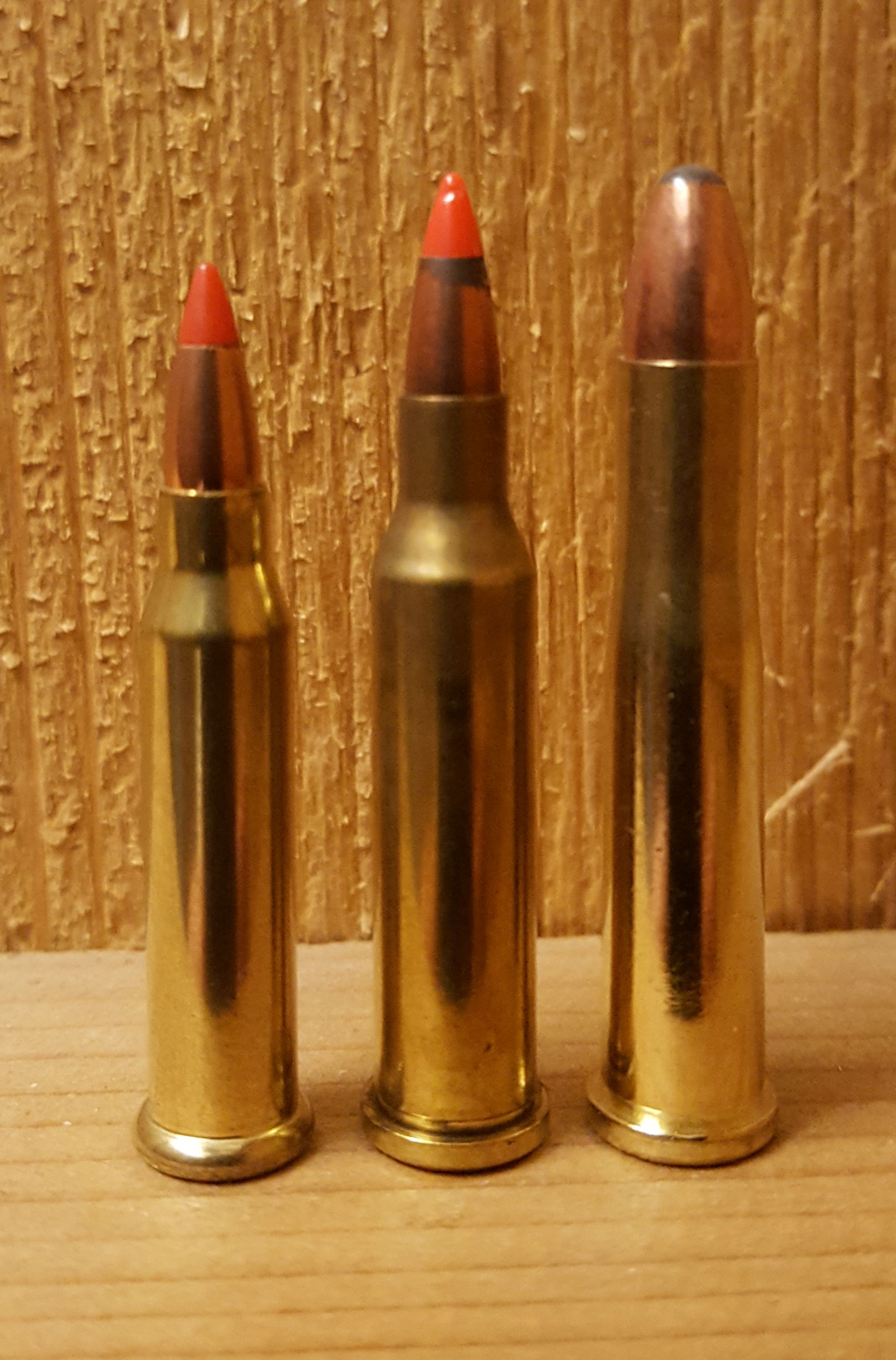
- .17 WSM (left), with .17 Hornet (center) and .22 Hornet (right)
- Type: Rifle
- Place of origin: United States

Production history
- Designer: Winchester
- Designed: 2012
- Produced: 2013–present

Specifications
- Parent case: .27 caliber nail gun blank cartridge
- Case type: Rimmed, bottleneck
- Bullet diameter: .172 in (4.4 mm)
- Neck diameter: .197 in (5.0 mm)
- Shoulder diameter: .269 in (6.8 mm)
- Base diameter: .269 in (6.8 mm)
- Rim diameter: .333 in (8.5 mm)
- Rim thickness: .066 in (1.7 mm)
- Case length: 1.200 in (30.5 mm)
- Overall length: 1.440 in (36.58 mm) to 1.590 in (40.39 mm)
- Primer type: Rimfire
- Maximum pressure: 33,000 psi (230 MPa)

Ballistic performance
Bullet mass/type	Velocity	Energy
20 gr. (1.3 g)	3,000 ft/s (910 m/s)	400 ft⋅lbf (540 J)
25 gr. (1.6 g)	2,600 ft/s (790 m/s)	375 ft⋅lbf (508 J)

.17 Winchester Super Magnum, commonly known as the .17 WSM, is a rimfire rifle cartridge developed by the ammunition company Winchester in 2012. It descended from a .27 caliber nail-gun blank cartridge by necking down the blank case to take a .17 caliber (4.5mm) bullet. Initial loadings were with a 20 grains (1.3 g) bullet, delivering muzzle velocities around 3,000-foot-per-second (910 m/s).

== Development ==
Winchester, in conjunction with Savage, introduced this cartridge at the 2013 SHOT Show.

The brass case for the .17 WSM is roughly 50% thicker than the .17 HMR, and has a chamber pressure of 33,000 psi, compared to the chamber pressure of 26,000 psi for the .17 HMR. The .17 WSM is not compatible with firearms chambered in .17 HMR and vice versa as the two cartridges have different dimensions.

== Factory ammunition ==
Factory ammunition is available from Winchester, Federal, American Eagle. Federal Ammunition American Eagle .17 Winchester Super Magnum cartridges are currently only available with 1.3 gram (20 grain) polymer-tipped projectiles rated at 914 m/s (3,000 fps) at the muzzle.

Several options from Winchester are available, including Varmint HV .17 Winchester Super Magnum with a 1.3 gram (20 grain) polymer-tipped projectile rated at 914 m/s (3,000 fps), Varmint HE .17 Winchester Super Magnum with a 1.6 gram (25 grain) polymer-tipped projectile rated at 793 m/s (2,600 fps), and Varmint-X .17 Winchester Super Magnum which is available with a lead-free 1 gram (15 grain) polymer tipped projectile, rated at 1,006 m/s (3,300 fps).

== Firearms ==
Currently, rifles chambered for the .17 WSM are the Savage B-Mag bolt action heavy barrel B-mag target edition, Ruger Model 77/17, Winchester 1885 Low Wall single shot, and the semi-automatic Franklin Armory F-17. The F-17 is the first gas-piston operated rimfire firearm designed to handle the higher pressures of this cartridge. Also recently Jard Inc. joined this list with their J71 .17 WSM AR 15 rifle.

== See also ==
- 4.5×26mm MKR
- .17 HMR
- 4 mm caliber
- Table of handgun and rifle cartridges
