= MCEM 2 submachine gun =

MCEM 2
- Type: Submachine gun
- Place of origin: United Kingdom

Production history
- Designer: Jerzy Podsedkowski
- Designed: 1944
- Manufacturer: Royal Small Arms Factory

Specifications
- Cartridge: 9×19mm Parabellum
- Caliber: 9mm
- Action: Blowback
- Rate of fire: 1,000RPM
- Feed system: 30-round magazine
- Sights: Iron

The MCEM-2 (Machine Carbine Experimental Model 2) was a prototype submachine gun, which never saw widespread production, but was one of the first submachine guns to combine a wrap-around bolt and the magazine in pistol grip, features later copied in the Czechoslovak Sa vz. 23 and Israeli Uzi. The MCEM-2 was the second prototype in a line of experimental submachine guns designed in Britain in 1944. It was envisaged as a possible replacement for the STEN submachine gun then in service.

Jerzy Podsedkowski, a Polish constructor who worked on the Vis and Mors and who fled from occupied Poland to Britain, developed the MCEM-2. It is believed that prototypes of MCEM-2 were made before the end of WW2, and its derivatives MCEM-4 and MCEM-6 were tested soon after the war. The latter modifications differed mostly in adoption of the rate-reducing mechanism, incorporated into the trigger unit; the rate of fire therefore was decreased from 1000 to 600 rounds per minute. Nevertheless, neither the prototype was found suitable for adoption, and several years later the British army adopted a more conventional submachine gun, the Sterling-Patchett.

The MCEM-2 is a blowback-operated, selective-fire weapon that fires from an open bolt. It uses a telescoping bolt, with most of its mass in front of the breech face. The receiver is made from steel, and the pistol grip is attached below. The magazine is inserted into the pistol grip – a feature copied from the Mors.

== See also ==
- PM-63 RAK
- SM-9
