= Remington Model 512 Sportmaster =

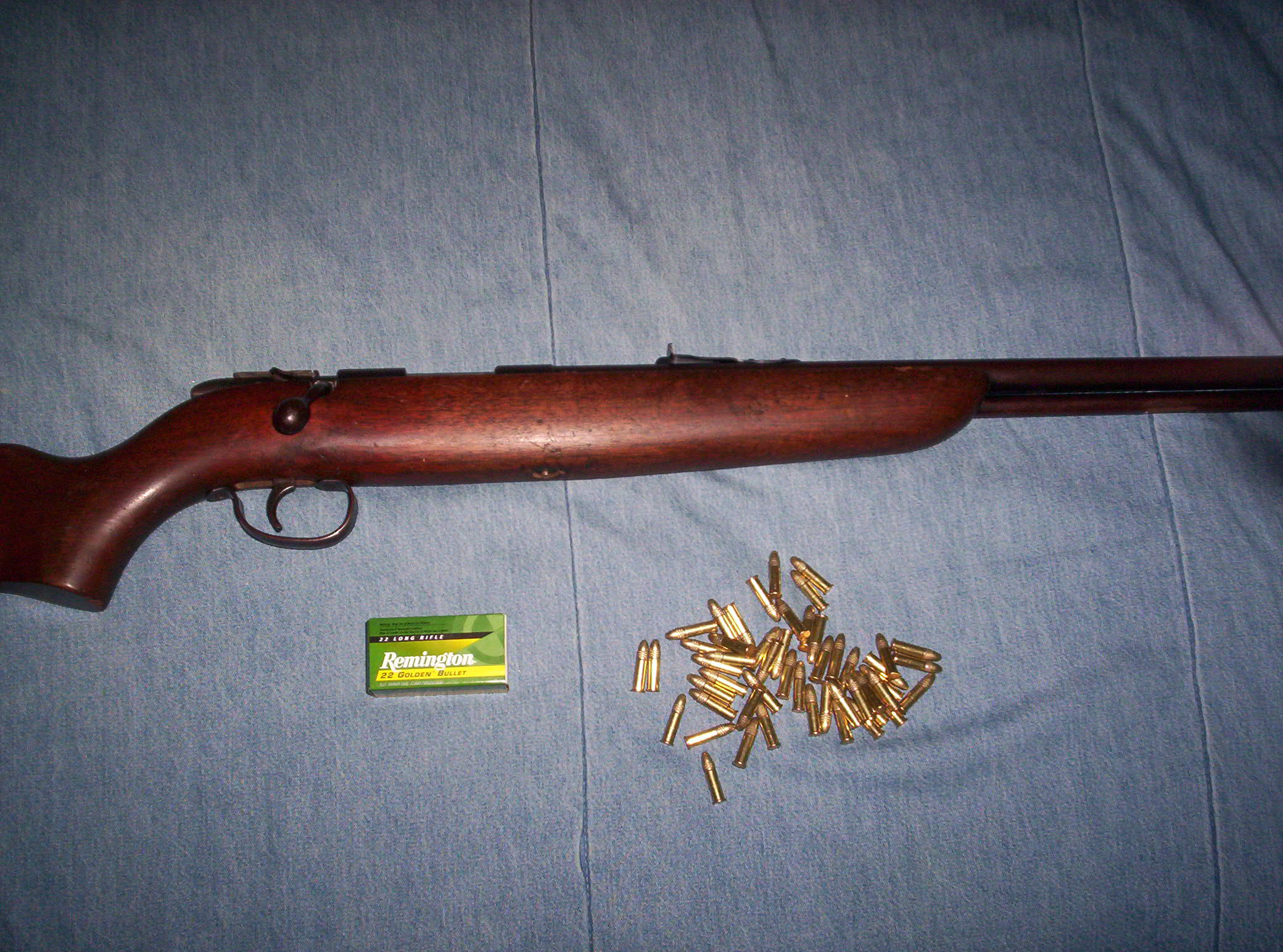
- Type: Rifle
- Place of origin: United States

Production history
- Designer: Remington R&D
- Manufacturer: Remington Arms
- Produced: 1940–1962; 1964–1966 (Model 512X)
- No. built: approx. 393,665
- Variants: Model 512P; Model 512SB; Model 512X

Specifications
- Mass: 6 lb (2.7 kg)
- Length: 43 in (110 cm)
- Barrel length: 25 in (64 cm)
- Cartridge: .22 LR, .22 Long, and .22 Short
- Action: Bolt-Action
- Feed system: Tubular magazine: 22-rounds (22 short); 17-rounds (22 long); 15-rounds (22 LR)
- Sights: White metal bead front, open rear

The Remington Model 512 Sportmaster is a bolt-action rifle manufactured by Remington Arms. The Model 512 has a 25-inch (64 cm) barrel, a one-piece hardwood stock, and a blued metal finish. An unusual feature of this rifle is that it uses a tubular magazine in conjunction with a bolt action. Most modern tube-fed firearms typically use a lever action or a pump action, but in the middle of the 20th century, many bolt-action .22's used tubular magazines as the high-capacity magazine of the era.

== Variants ==
Model 512P
The Model 512P had the same specs as the standard model but with a patridge-type blade front sight and a "point-crometer" peep rear sight. Link to owners manual.
Model 512SB
The Model 512SB was the SmoothBore model (Garden Gun) with open sights.
Model 512X
The Model 512X featured improved sights and was produced from 1964 until 1966.
