= Remington Model 513 =

Remington Model 513 Matchmaster
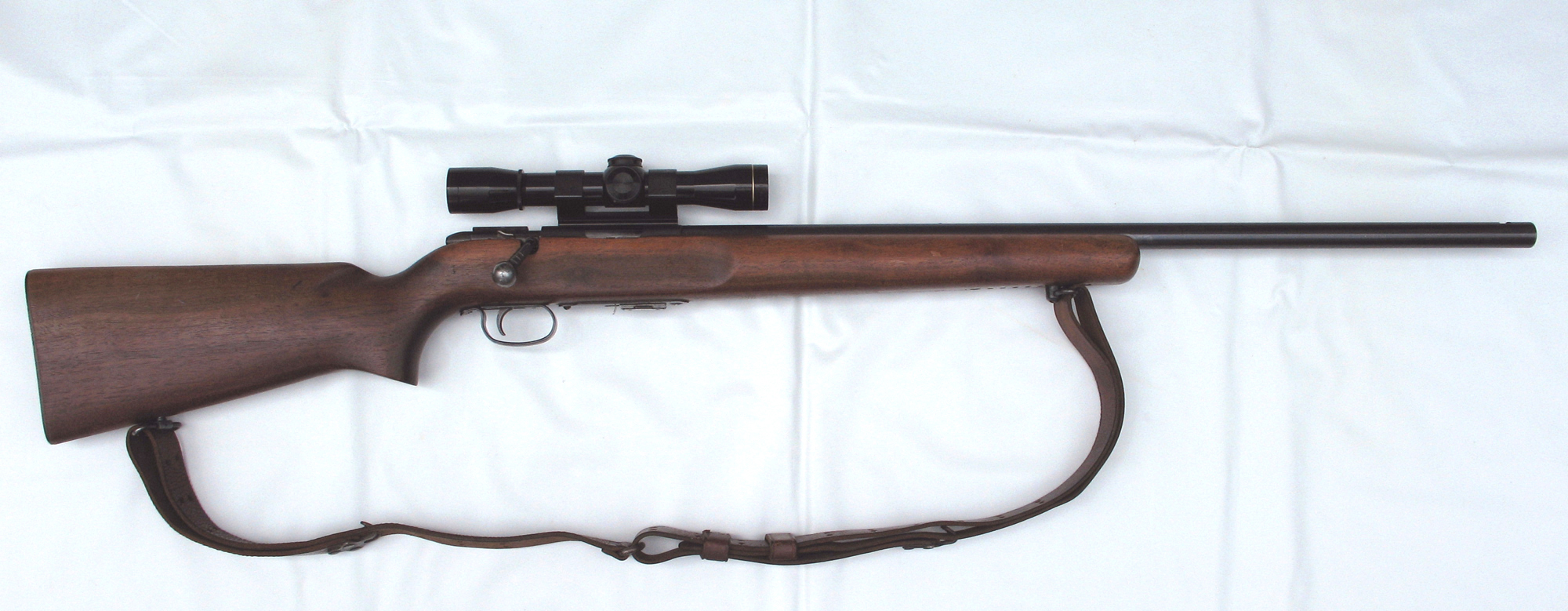
- Type: Sporting and Target Rifle
- Place of origin: United States

Production history
- Manufacturer: Remington
- Produced: 1940–1968
- Variants: 513S Sporter 513T Target

Specifications
- Mass: 9 pounds (4.08 kg)(Empty magazine)
- Barrel length: 27 inches (685.8 mm)
- Cartridge: .22 Long Rifle
- Action: Bolt-Action
- Feed system: 6-round or 10-round detachable magazine
- Sights: Redfield 75 rear sight & Redfield 68 globe front sight.

The Remington Model 513 Matchmaster is a bolt-action rifle, manufactured from 1940 to 1968. Since the rifle was designed for target shooting, it came equipped with a sturdy half stock with sling swivels, a beavertail fore end, and a straight comb which rose at the heel. Matchmaster barrels were a 27" heavy target semi-floating type. The patented Matchmaster trigger mechanism had an adjustable stop. The Matchmaster was made to fire only the .22-caliber Long Rifle cartridge from a detachable magazine. Civilian versions of the Matchmaster have a blued finish, while those made for U.S. Army and ROTC service can have either a blued or a parkerized finish.

A letter code was stamped on the left side of the barrel, just forward of the receiver. Usually the two middle letters indicate the month and year in which the rifle was manufactured. The first and/or fourth characters are inspectors' stamps. The serial number of the rifle was stamped on the underside of the barrel, just forward of the stock.

== Variants ==
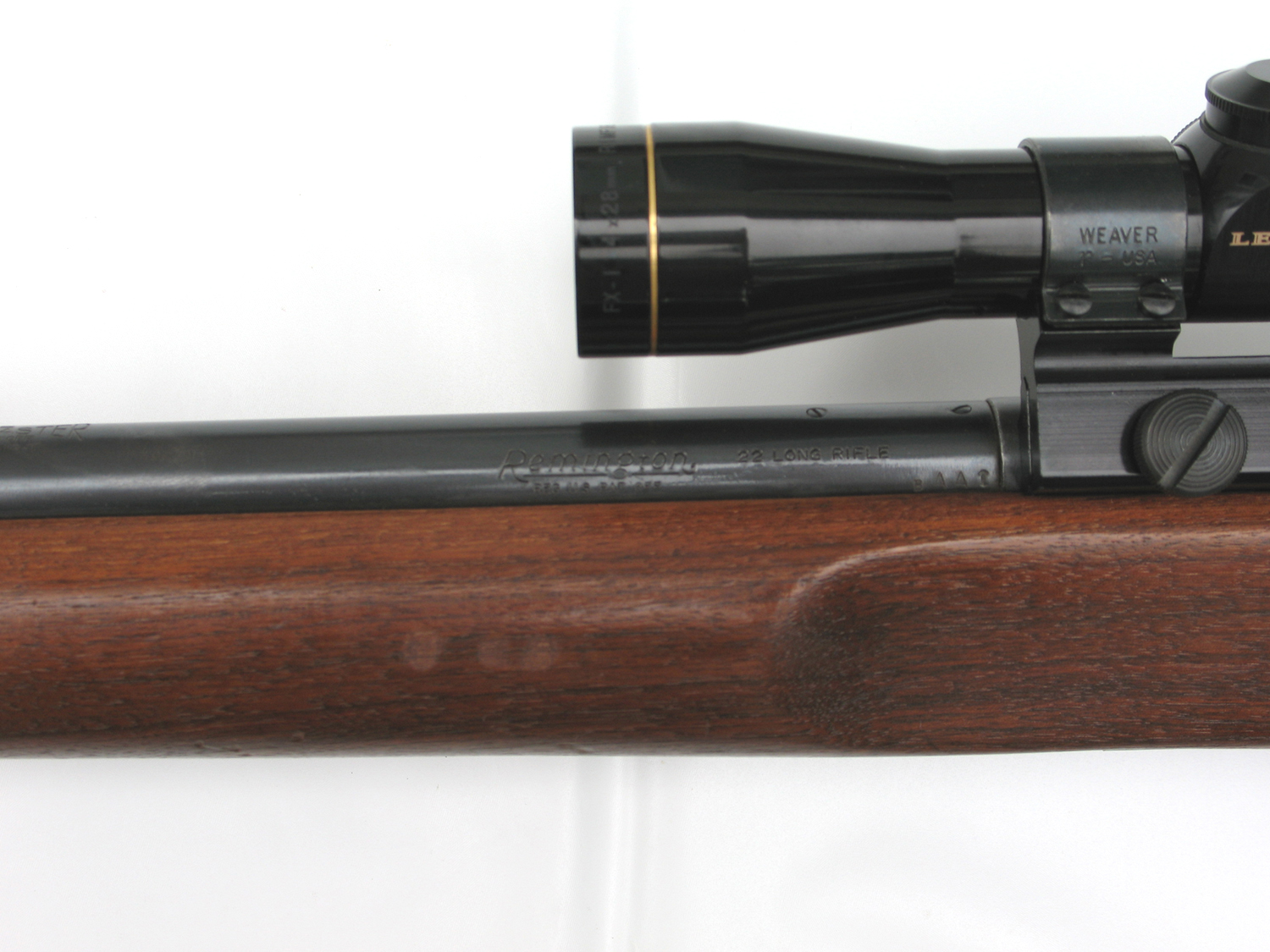
Left side of the Remington 513T. You can see the "AA" date code stamp on the barrel.

Model 513T rifles came equipped with Redfield aperture sights, 27-inch heavy barrel, target stock made of American Walnut, six-shot magazine and 1.25-inch sling swivels. The "T" suffix indicates that the rifle was the target model, originally equipped with target sights.

The "S" variant is medium-weight sporter rifle. Model 513TS or 513S rifles were sporter models equipped with regular sporting-style sights. The "S" had a non-target-type barrel, a ramp or post front sight, and lacked the rear receiver mounting block for a rear aperture sight. The Model 513TX was set up for a scope and came with no sights.

== History ==
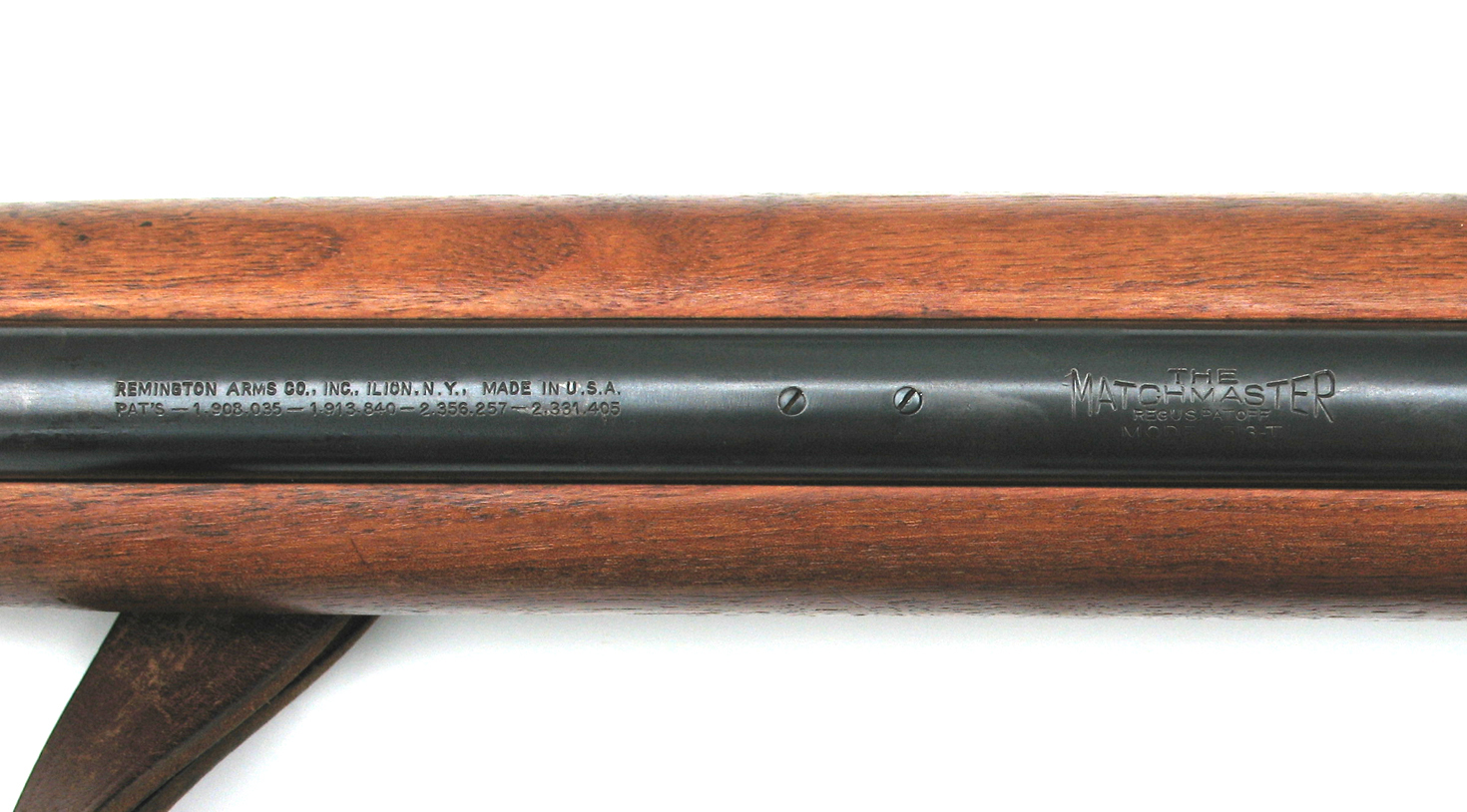
Remington 513T Barrel Markings.

There was a contract from the government to Remington for 10,000 .22 target rifles in 1940. During World War II, 513T rifle were used by the Army for training purposes. This included issue to DCM affiliated clubs for training juniors, and to ROTC units. Those rifles that were purchased by the Army were stamped "U.S. PROPERTY" on the barrel and the receiver.

According to the Remington website, approximately 137,302 Model 513s were manufactured. Today Remington 513T Matchmasters are still being used in smallbore competitions and are worth from $200 to $700, depending on their condition.
