= Remington Model 788 =

Remington 788
- Remington 788
- Type: Rifle
- Place of origin: United States

Production history
- Designer: Wayne Leek
- Manufacturer: Remington Arms
- Produced: 1967–1983
- No. built: 565,000

Specifications
- Cartridge: .222 Remington.223 Remington.22-250 Remington.243 Winchester; 6mm Remington; 7mm-08 Remington.308 Winchester.30-30 Winchester.44 Remington Magnum
- Action: Bolt-action repeater
- Feed system: 3-rd, single-column box magazine

The Remington 788 is a bolt-action, centerfire rifle that was made by Remington Arms from 1967 to 1983. It was marketed as an inexpensive yet accurate hunting rifle to compete with other gun companies' less expensive rifles alongside their more expensive Model 700 line. The 788 utilizes a single-column detachable magazine holding 3 rounds for the larger diameter calibers and 4 rounds for the 222 Rem and 223 Rem. A .22 rimfire model was also produced known as the 580, 581, or 582 depending on its method of feed. A target version of the .22 caliber 58x series, the 540X, was used by the US military as a training rifle and later disposed through the Civilian Marksmanship Program.

== Design ==
Remington 788 bolt

The Remington 788 has two distinguishing design features. The first is the rear-lugged bolt. The bolt has nine lugs in three rows of three lugs each. They lock into the receiver behind the magazine well. Due to this design, the bolt handle lifts only 60 degrees on opening giving more clearance for scopes compared to the 90 degrees required for the Model 700 and other two-lug rifles. The bolt travel is also reduced because of the rear lugs. The bolt pictured is a pre-1975 locking model from a .308 Winchester caliber rifle. The locking bolt requires the safety to be in the "fire" or "off" position in order to rotate the handle and actuate the bolt. Rifles manufactured from 1975 to 1983 have non-locking bolts which can be actuated while the safety is engaged. The second distinguishing feature is the receiver. It has a smaller ejection port than similar bolt-action rifles, and no bolt lug raceways. The single stack magazine design yields a smaller feed opening in the bottom of the receiver compared to rifles using a double stack magazine well. When machining of these smaller ports is complete there is more steel remaining in the receiver between the ejection port and adjacent feed port, and significantly more steel overall where all receivers have the least strength. These characteristics combined to make the Remington 788 receiver more rigid and stronger than most, if not all, competing designs, including the Remington 700 which shares the same outside receiver diameter. A rifle's accuracy tends to increase slightly as the rigidity of the receiver increases, as this slightly reduces barrel deflection during firing. Thus the Remington 788 has the structural foundation to be a very accurate rifle.

== Variants ==
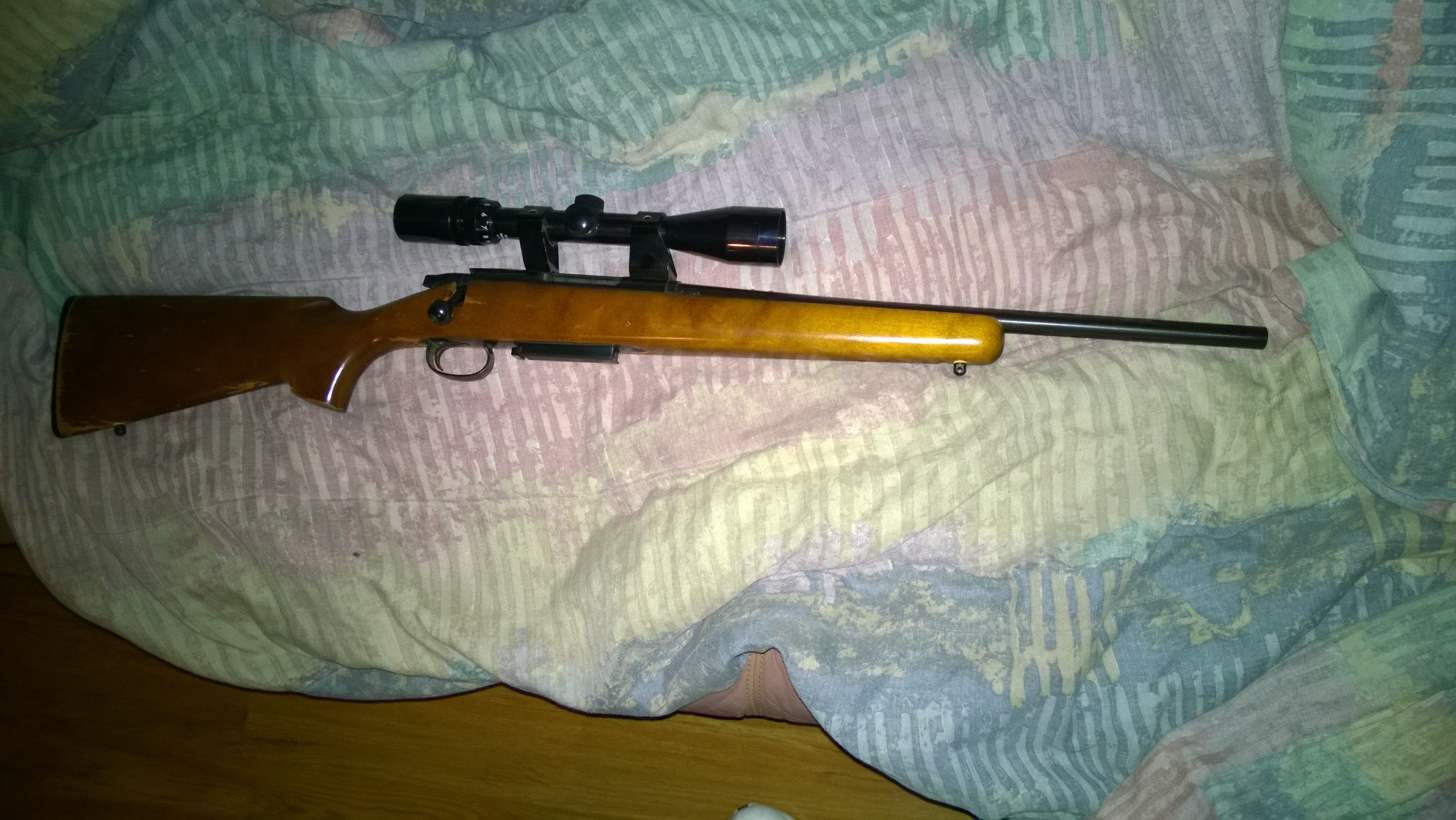
Remington 788 with the 18.5 inch barrel in 243 Win caliber made in 1982.

A left-handed version was produced in .308 and 6mm Remington calibers. The Carbine version with an 18.5-inch (47 cm) barrel was produced in .308 Winchester, 7mm-08, and .243. The stock was revised in 1980 being the only significant change throughout the production history. The following table presents a breakdown of this rifle's 13 year production run by caliber, year, and configuration.

Rifle	Year	w/18 ½" barrel
.222 Rem	1967–1980, 1982	
.223 Rem	1975	
.22-250 Rem	1967	
.243 Win	1968	1980
6mm Rem	1969–1980	
6mm Rem Left Hand	1969–1980	
7mm-08 Rem		1980
.308 Win	1969	
.308 Win Left Hand	1969–1980	1980
.30-30 Win	1967–1970	
.44 Rem Mag	1967–1970	

=== MAC Destroyer Carbine ===
Designed by former Office of Strategic Services (OSS) officer Mitchell WerBell III as a considerably more robust version of the silenced De Lisle carbine for special and clandestine operations in Indochina. While WerBell's original design was a modified Destroyer carbine, most of the carbines delivered to the US Army by the Military Armament Corporation (MAC) were Model 788 rifles converted to fire 9×19mm Parabellum rounds, fitted with a silencer and a Tasco 4× magnification power scope, and modified to accept Walther P38 magazines due the shortage of surplus Spanish guns in the American market.
