= Remington Model 511 Scoremaster =

- Remington Scoremaster 511
- Type: Rifle
- Place of origin: United States

Production history
- Designer: Remington R&D
- Manufacturer: Remington Arms
- Produced: 1939–1963
- No. built: approx. 381,267
- Variants: Model 511P; Model 511SB; Model 511X

Specifications
- Mass: 5.75 lb (2.61 kg)
- Length: 43 in (110 cm)
- Barrel length: 25 in (64 cm)
- Cartridge: .22 LR, .22 Long, and .22 Short
- Action: Bolt-Action
- Feed system: 6-round or 10-round detachable magazine
- Sights: Open or peep

The Remington Model 511 Scoremaster is a bolt-action rifle manufactured by Remington Arms from 1939 until 1963. The Model 511 has a 25-inch (64 cm) barrel, a one-piece hardwood stock, and a blued metal finish.

== Variants ==
Model 511P
The Model 511P had the same specs as the standard model but with a patridge-type blade front sight and a "point-crometer" peep rear sight.
Model 511SB
The Model 511SB was the SmoothBore model (Garden Gun) with open sights.
Model 511X
The Model 511X featured improved sights and was produced from 1965 until 1966.
