= Haskins Rifle =

- Type: Sniper rifle
- Place of origin: United States

Service history
- In service: 1983

Production history
- Designer: Jerry Haskins
- Designed: 1981–1982

Specifications
- Mass: 5.7 kg (unloaded w/o scope)
- Barrel length: 610 mm
- Cartridge: 8.58×71mm, 7.62×51mm & 12.7×99mm NATO
- Action: Bolt-action
- Feed system: 5-round (7.62) or 4-round (8.58) detachable box magazine
- Sights: Detachable telescopic sight

The Haskins Rifle, also known as the RAI 300 (Research Armament Model 300) or Haskins M500 rifle was a bolt-action weapon designed by Jerry Haskins between 1981 and 1982 for snipers in the US Military. Unlike most military sniper rifles, the Haskins was purpose-built for the military, not reworked from an existing civilian firearm.

The Haskins was developed from a US Army requirement for an antimaterial capability. Standard 7.62×51mm sniper rifles were unable to meet the penetration requirements. Several experimental cartridges were produced, culminating in a convertible lightweight bolt-action rifle able to use .50 caliber machine-gun cartridges, or a lighter, faster, then-wildcat cartridge optimized for antipersonnel use, with some antimaterial ability.

The US Army declined to purchase the lighter rifle, but purchased a small number of the .50 caliber rifles. They are now used by some United States Army Special Forces snipers. The Haskins m500 sniper rifle fires a .50 caliber round as far as 2 km and can still hit a target the size of a garbage bin.

Although not adopted in large numbers by the US, the weapon served as a testbed for new sniper ammunition. The cartridge originally used, the 8.58×71mm, was eventually developed by the Lapua-Nammo Oy company in Finland into the .338 Lapua Magnum.

The Haskins was a bolt-action, magazine-fed weapon, featuring a steel receiver with a rotating bolt. The bolt had 3 long lugs which locked into the receiver walls. The weapon could use one of two cartridges: the 7.62×51mm NATO and the 8.58×71 mm. Switching between calibers was relatively simple, requiring that only the barrel and bolt head be replaced.

William Brophy, an American Army Ordnance officer when discussing comparable weapons stated:

The Haskins .50 caliber is a single shot rifle requiring the shooter to remove the bolt after each round is fired. The shooter actually places the rim of the cartridge into a slot on the bolt, then inserts this combination into the receiver. The Haskins is an extremely accurate system. I have personally fired this weapon out to 1800 meters and acquired about an 80% first round hit probability. The weapon uses a removable muzzle brake, which at one time allowed the shooter to choose between several types of brakes. A note of caution here to anyone encountering this system. It is possible to install the muzzle brake on backwards which will send the after shock directly onto the shooter and spotter (not a pleasant experience).

The Haskins featured a detachable scope mount, heavy precision barrel, a folding bipod, a fully adjustable trigger and could be disassembled for ease of carry and storage.

The Haskins was used by the Provisional Irish Republican Army to fire upon British troops in Northern Ireland. It became highly feared; this weapon was the cause of many deaths.
