= Remington Model 121 Fieldmaster =

Remington Model 121
- Type: Rifle
- Place of origin: United States

Production history
- Designer: C. C. Loomis; G. H. Garrison
- Manufacturer: Remington
- Produced: 1936–1954
- No. built: 199,891
- Variants: see variants

Specifications
- Cartridge: .22 Short; .22 Long; .22 LR
- Action: Slide-Action
- Feed system: Under-barrel, 14-20 rounds.

The Fieldmaster 121 series is a .22 caliber, slide action, tubular magazine-fed rifle manufactured by Remington Arms between 1936 and 1954. The Sportmaster 121 has a 25" barrel, a one piece hardwood stock, and a blued metal finish. It was replaced by the Model 572 Fieldmaster in 1955.

== Variants ==
- 121A Standard
- 121D Peerless
- 121E Expert
- 121F Premier
- 121ES
- 121FS
- 121SB Smooth Bore
- 121S Special Grade
