= List of Remington models =

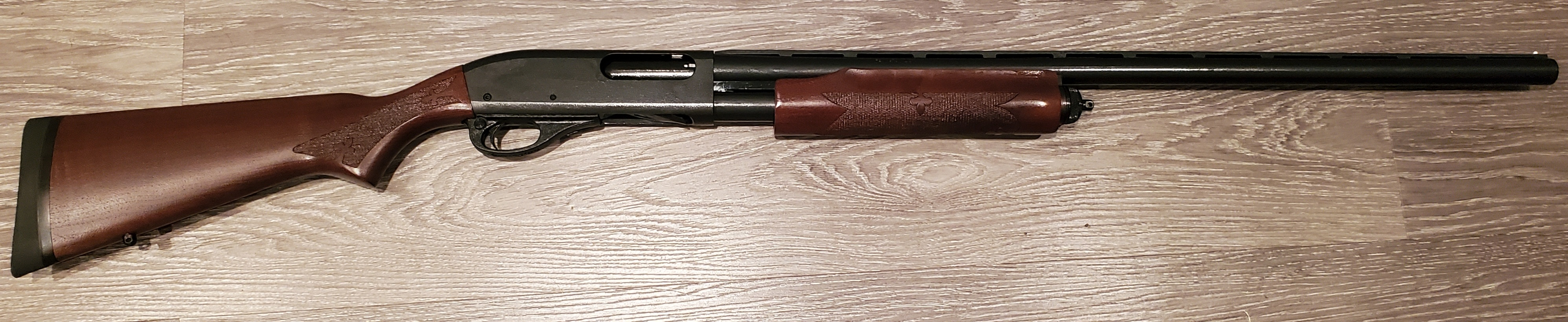
A Remington Model 870 shotgun

Below is a list of firearms produced by the Remington Arms Company, founded in 1816 as E. Remington and Sons. Following the breakup of Remington Outdoor Company in 2020, the Remington Firearms brand name operates under RemArms, LLC.

== Rifles ==
=== Bolt-action ===
- JuniorTarget 521TL
- Remington–Keene rifle
- Remington-Lee Rifles
- M1903 Springfield rifle
- Mosin–Nagant
- M1917 Enfield rifle
- Model 5
- Model 6
- Model 7
- Model 30
- Model 33
- Model 34
- Model 241
- Model 504
- Model 511 Scoremaster
- Model 512 Sportmaster
- Model 513
- Model 541S
- Model 541T
- Model 580
- Model 591
- Model 592
- Model 600
- Model 660
- Model 673
- Model 700
- Model 710
- Model 720
- Model 721
- Model 722
- Model 725
- Model 770
- Model 783
- Model 788
- Model 798
- Model 799

==== Sniper rifles ====
- Modular Sniper Rifle
- M24 Sniper Rifle
- XM2010 ESR
- SR-8

=== Pump-action ===
- Model Six
- Model 12
- Model 14
- Model 25
- Model 121 Fieldmaster
- Model 141
- Model 572
- Model 572 Fieldmaster
- Model 760
- Model 7600

=== Semi-automatic ===
- Model Four
- Model 8
- Model 24
- Nylon 66
- Apache 77
- Model 522
- Model 550-1
- Model 552
- Model 597
- Model 740
- Model 742
- Model 750
- Model 7400
- Model R-15
- Model R-25
- Remington RSASS

=== Single-shot ===
- Remington 1863 Contract Rifle aka "Zouave Rifle"
- Remington-Hepburn No. 3 Falling Block Rifle
- Remington Model 1816 Musket aka "Maynard Rifle"
- Remington Rolling Block rifle family
  - Remington Rolling Block Model 4
  - Remington Rolling Block Model 6
  - Remington M1867

=== Automatic ===
- Adaptive Combat Rifle (Note: Military versions only. Civilian versions are built by Bushmaster Firearms International.)
- R4
- R5 RGP

=== Other ===
- Nylon 76 (lever-action)
- Express Air Rifle

== Shotguns ==
=== Pump-action ===
- Model 10
- Model 17
- Model 29
- Model 31
- Model 870
- Model 887

=== Semi-automatic ===
- Model 11 (Browning Auto-5)
- Model 11-48
- Model 11-87
- Model 11-96 – "Euro Lightweight"
- Model 58 – "Sportsman 58"
- Model 878 – "878 Automaster"
- Model 1100
- Model SP-10
- Spartan 453
- Versa Max
- V3

=== Break-action ===
- Model 1894 SXS
- Model 3
- Model 9
- Model 32
- Model 3200
- Spartan 100
- Spartan 310
- Model 396
- Peerless

== Handguns ==
=== Semi-automatic ===
- 1911 R1
- Model 51
- R51
- RM380
- RP9
- RP45

=== Derringer ===
- Remington Rider Single Shot Pistol
- Zig-Zag Derringer
- Model 95

=== Revolvers ===
- 1st Model
- 2nd Model
- 3rd Model
- Remington–Smoot No. 1 Revolver
- Model 1858
- Model 1875
- Model 1890

=== Other ===
- Naval Model 1865 Pistol (rolling-block)
- XP-100 (bolt-action)
