= Para USA =

Private firearms manufacturer

Para USA, LLC
- Formerly: Para-Ordnance
- Type: Private
- Industry: Arms industry
- Founded: 1985
- Founders: Ted Szabo and Thanos Polyzos
- Defunct: 2015 (closure of brand)
- Fate: Acquired (2012)
- Headquarters: Charlotte, North Carolina, United States
- Products: Firearms
- Parent: Remington Outdoor Company

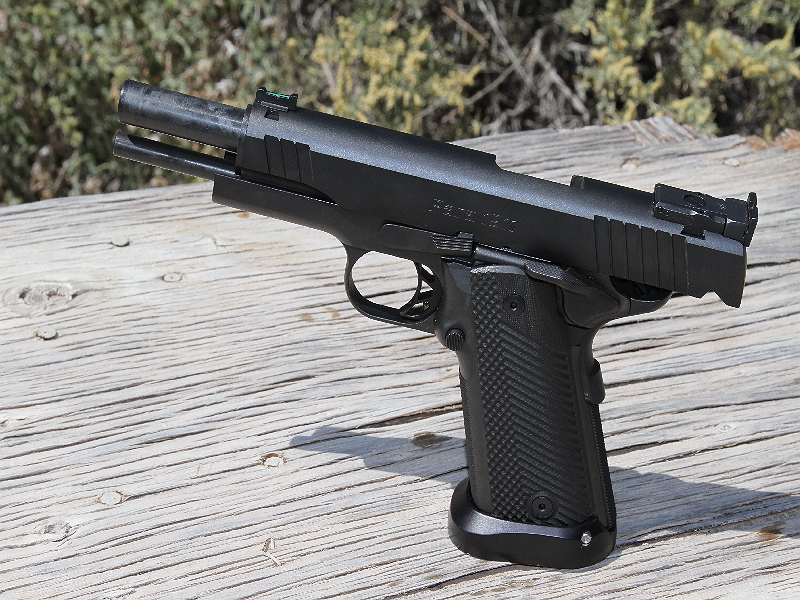
Custom P14-45

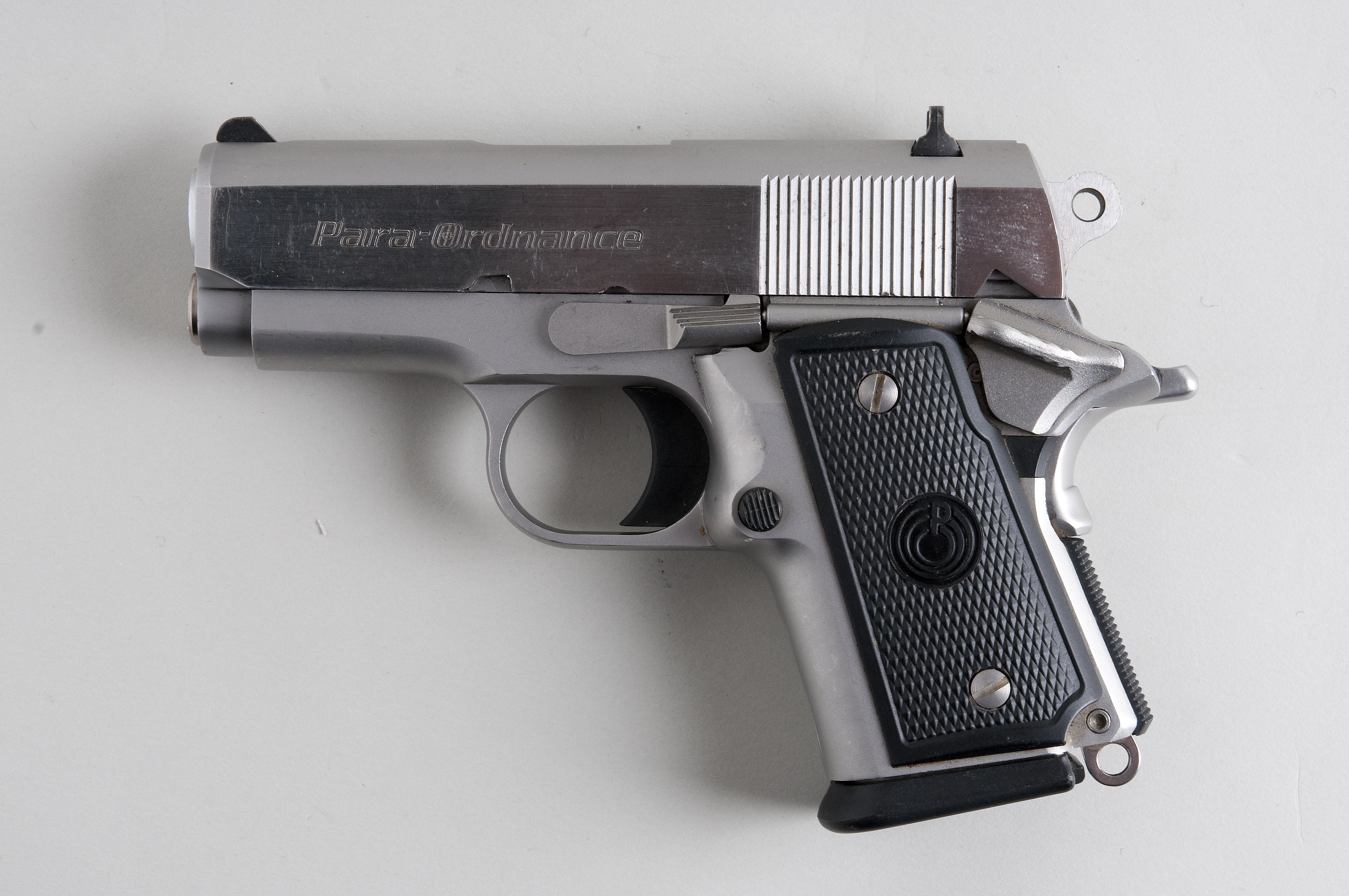
Para Ordnance 10-45

Para USA (Para) was an American-owned firearms manufacturer. It was the successor to Para-Ordnance, founded in Canada in 1985. It specialized in making M1911-style semi-automatic pistols and components. The company was acquired by Remington Outdoor Company in 2012. In 2015, the Para brand ceased production and was folded into Remington.

== History ==
Para-Ordnance was founded in Canada in 1985 by two childhood friends, Ted Szabo and Thanos Polyzos. Szabo was born in Hungary and his family fled the country when the Soviets invaded during the Hungarian Revolution in 1956. Polyzos was born in Greece and later emigrated to Canada. On March 28, 2007, Ted Szabo died at the age of 60. The company's first product was a plastic paintball gun, the Model 85 "Dye Marking Tactical Machine Pistol", designed for law enforcement and military training purposes.

Para-Ordnance Mfg Inc. had a factory in Markham, Ontario, Canada. When last reported, the company was estimated to have an annual revenue of over 9 million dollars and employ a staff of 60. In January 2009, it was announced that the U.S. headquarters for Para-Ordnance's U.S. subsidiary (Para USA) would be set up in Pineville, North Carolina. Eventually, Para Ordnance moved to North Carolina and became a totally U.S. company, Para USA.

In January 2012, Para USA was acquired to become part of the Freedom Group, a consortium of firearms manufacturers owned by Cerberus Capital Management, a New York private equity investment firm. Remington is Para USA's immediate corporate parent.

Since 2007, Remington Arms had been part of the Remington Outdoor Company (ROC NYSE), which is owned by Cerberus Capital Management. Freedom Group had previously purchased Marlin Firearms and DPMS Panther Arms in 2007. Cerberus combined DPMS and other firearm companies with Remington Arms, Bushmaster Firearms International, and Cobb Manufacturing to form the Freedom Group.

In 2014, the six subsidiary companies that would relocate and consolidate into Remington Arms's new state-of-the-art non-union production facility in Huntsville, Alabama, were: Advanced Armament Corp, Lawrenceville, Georgia; Montana Rifleman, Kalispell, Montana; TAPCO, Kennesaw, Georgia; LAR Manufacturing, West Jordan, Utah; DPMS Panther Arms, St. Cloud, Minnesota; and Para USA (Para-Ordnance), Pineville, North Carolina. Remington stated that it would consolidate its production from those six locations into Huntsville in order to increase efficiency, and reduce production and labor costs.

In February 2015, Remington Outdoor Company announced that the "integration" of Para USA into Remington would occur with the move of Para USA to Remington's Huntsville, Alabama facility in March 2015. This also included the cessation of the Para name as a separate brand in the Freedom Group.

== Products ==
Para offers a wide range of products for the law enforcement, military, and civilian markets.

Para-Ordnance was the originator of a high capacity magazine M1911-style pistol. Para-Ordnance was also the manufacturer of the first double-action-only 1911-style pistol. The company has created a true double-stack 1911 pistol, in addition to single- and double-stack pistols in .45 ACP, .40 S&W, 9 mm Parabellum, and .38 Super calibers. Para pistols have found a variety of uses, including competition, law enforcement, concealed carry, and general shooting. The introduction of the LDA (Light Double Action) allowed law enforcement agencies to use 1911-style pistols while still addressing the perceived liability issues of a single-action pistol.

In 2009, Para-Ordnance purchased the rights to the LR-300 and announced its version as the TTR "Tactical Target Rifle", which featured an over-the-barrel delayed gas blowback system, dubbed DIGS, which lessens recoil when compared with a traditional gas system. The TTR also relocated the recoil spring assembly over the barrel and under the handguard, allowing it to have a true folding stock. Production ceased in 2011 when Para USA exited the rifle market.

== Gallery ==
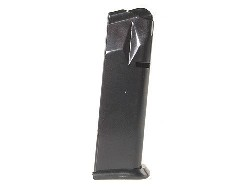
A P14-45 magazine.

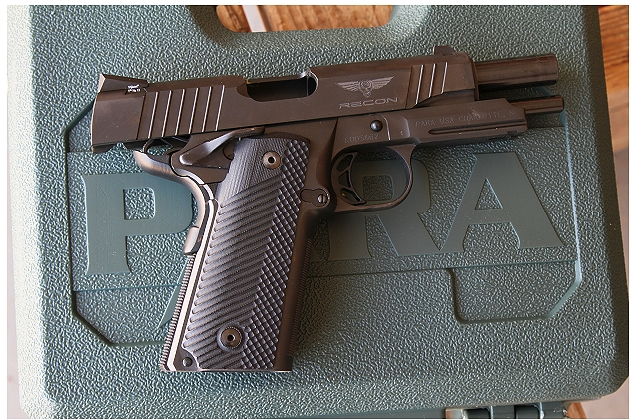
A Para USA Recon Commander High Capacity Ion Bond finish

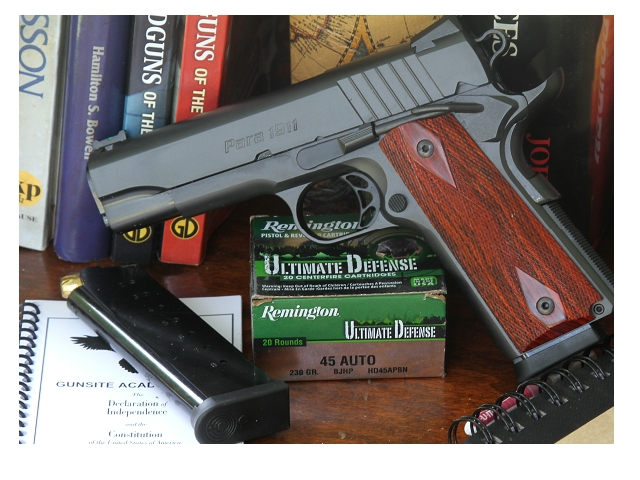
Para USA Elite Commander Alloy Frame Ion Bond finish
