= Model 5 =

Model 5 may refer to:

- Operation Model 5, a military operation
- the Breese-Wilde Model 5, an airplane
- the Remington Model 5, a firearm
