= RemArms =

American firearms holding company

RemArms, LLC
- Logo of Remington Firearms, the brand name used by RemArms
- Type: Holding company
- Industry: Arms industry
- Founded: 2021; 5 years ago
- Headquarters: LaGrange, Georgia, U.S.
- Area served: Worldwide
- Key people: Ken D’Arcy, CEO
- Products: Firearms
- Brands: Remington Firearms
- Owner: Roundhill Group, LLC
- Website: www.remarms.com

RemArms, LLC, is an American holding company that operates the firearms manufacturing portion of the former Remington Arms company. Formerly based in Ilion, New York, the company relocated its headquarters to LaGrange, Georgia.

== History ==
Remington Arms was a notable American manufacturer of firearms, founded in 1816 by Eliphalet Remington and originally known as E. Remington and Sons. The company was acquired in June 2007 by a private equity firm, Cerberus Capital Management. It became part of the firm's Freedom Group, which was renamed in 2015 as Remington Outdoor Company. Remington Outdoor Company declared bankruptcy in 2018, from which it emerged, and in 2020, following which it was broken up.

The firearm portion of Remington Arms (excluding Marlin Firearms) was sold to Roundhill Group, LLC, and was then organized as RemArms, LLC. Vista Outdoor purchased Remington Arms' ammunition business, which it subsequently organized as Remington Ammunition. Vista Outdoor also purchased various intellectual property, including the Remington brand name. RemArms licensed use of the brand name from Vista Outdoor in order to market its products using Remington Firearms branding.

Both Remington Firearms and Remington Ammunition appear to claim Remington Arms' history, the former noting in a 2021 press release, "Founded in 1816, Remington Firearms is one of the nation’s oldest firearms brands, operating for 205 years" and the latter noting on its website "We’ve been here since 1816."

RemArms obtained a Federal Firearms License in early 2021, and resumed production of some firearms at the former-Remington Arms manufacturing facility in Ilion, New York. The company announced its launch in September 2021, via a video from its CEO.

In November 2021, the company announced it would relocate its global headquarters to LaGrange, Georgia, with plans to contain a new advanced manufacturing operation and a research and development center. In November 2023, it was reported that the company would end its operations in Ilion in March 2024 with approximately 250 to 300 employees affected by the plant closure. The plant's union representative, the United Mine Workers of America (UMWA), condemned the planned closure. Closure of the company's manufacturing operations in Ilion was reported to be imminent in mid-March 2024. Following the 2024 closure, the former Remington Ilion site is now being considered for use as an AI data center. As of 2026, Remington production continues at manufacturing facilities in Georgia and Arkansas.

As of March 2024, the company lists approximately 25 international distributors, located in:

Europe: Austria, Belgium, Bulgaria, Czechia, France, Germany, Greece, Hungary, Italy, Norway, Poland, Spain, Switzerland, Ukraine
South America: Argentina, Chile, Panama, Uruguay
Other: Australia, Canada, Japan, New Zealand, Saudi Arabia, Turkey

== Products ==
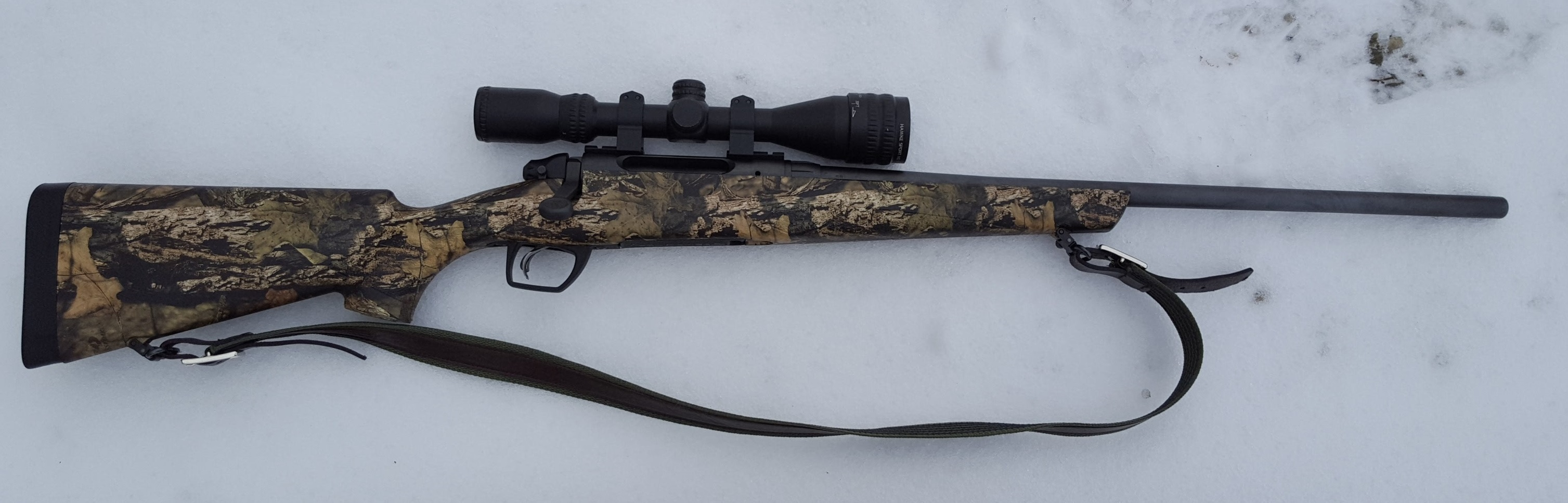
A Remington 783 rifle

Remington Arms manufactured many different models of rifles, shotguns, and handguns during its existence.

A smaller number of products have been offered under the Remington Firearms brand. As of March 2024, the following models were listed on the company's website:

=== Rifles ===
- Remington Model 700 (bolt action)
  - Muzzleloader variant also offered
- Remington Model 783 (bolt action)

=== Shotguns ===
- Remington V3 (autoloading)
  - Tactical variant also offered
- Remington Model 1100 (autoloading)
- Remington Model 870 (pump-action)
  - Tactical variants also offered
