= DPMS Panther Arms =

United States firearms manufacturer

- Type: Subsidiary
- Industry: Firearms
- Founded: 1985; 41 years ago
- Headquarters: West Columbia, South Carolina, United States
- Area served: Worldwide
- Products: Firearms
- Owner: JJE Capital Holdings LLC
- Website: https://dpmsinc.com/

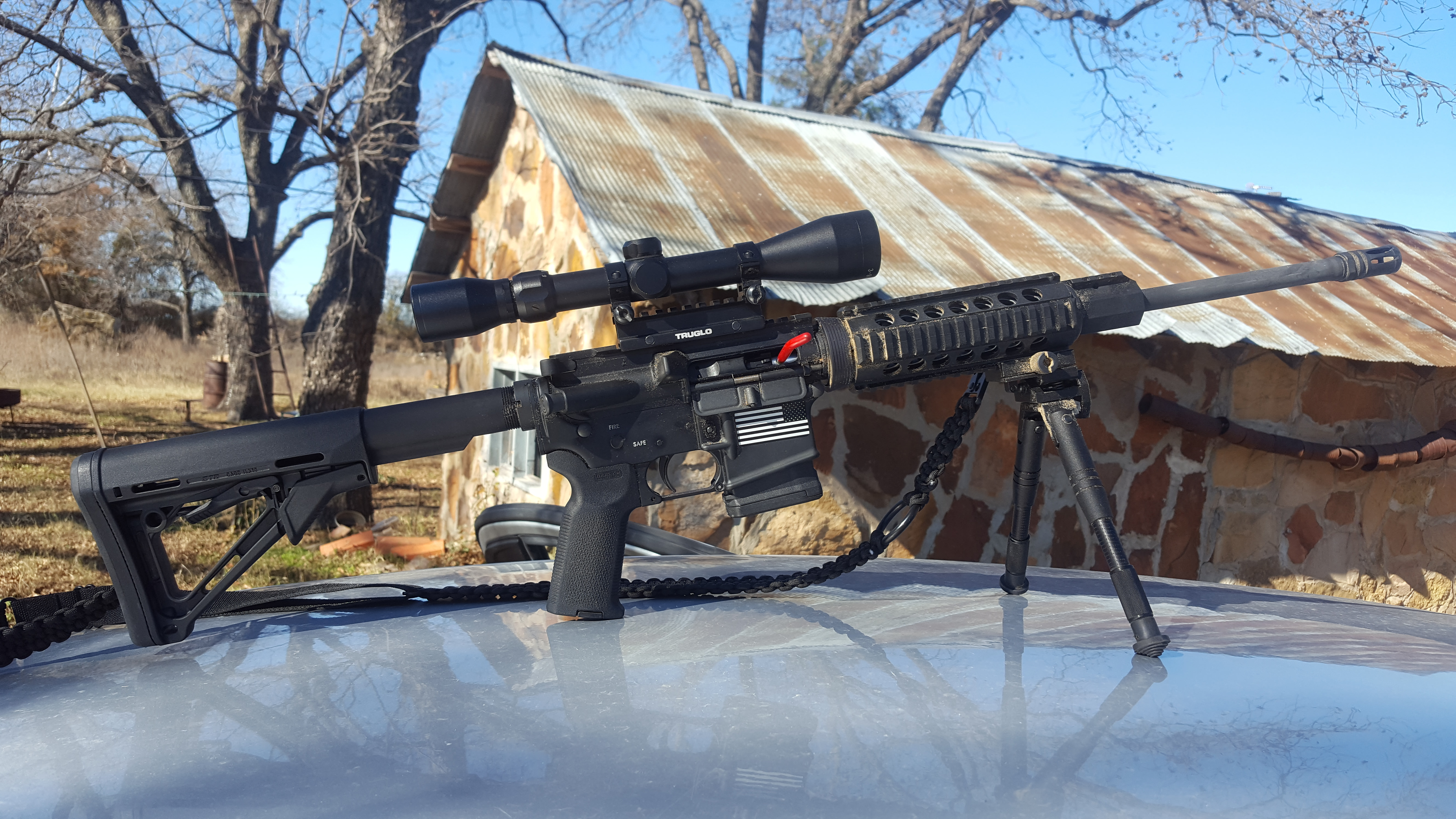
End user modified DPMS Oracle AR-15

DPMS (Defense Procurement Manufacturing Services) Panther Arms is an American manufacturer headquartered in West Columbia, South Carolina, known for its wide range of military and civilian rifles and accessories.

== History ==
Randy Luth founded Defense Procurement Manufacturing Services (DPMS) in 1985 in Osseo, Minnesota, as a precision machine shop for manufacturing M203, M14 and M16 parts for U.S. military contracts. In the later 1990s, the company employed 30 people selling Colt 1911 and AR-15 parts and accessories and moved the company to Becker, Minnesota. DPMS later began producing AR-15 style rifles.

DPMS moved to St. Cloud, Minnesota, in 2004. In 2007, the firm was named one of The Minneapolis-St. Paul Business Journal's "50 fastest-growing privately held companies". DPMS doubled its revenue between 2004–2007 and employed 65 people in 2008.

Freedom Group purchased DPMS Panther Arms on December 14, 2007, the same year it purchased Marlin Firearms. Freedom Group was a consortium of firearms manufacturers and was part of Cerberus Capital Management, a New York private equity investment firm. Cerberus combined DPMS with Bushmaster Firearms International, Remington Arms and Cobb Manufacturing to form the Freedom Group. Remington was the company's immediate corporate parent.

On December 20, 2012, Cerberus announced they were selling their Freedom Group brands, including DPMS, based on pressure from a California pension board.

DPMS was purchased by JJE Capital Holdings LLC on September 29, 2020, during the Remington bankruptcy proceedings.

== Products ==
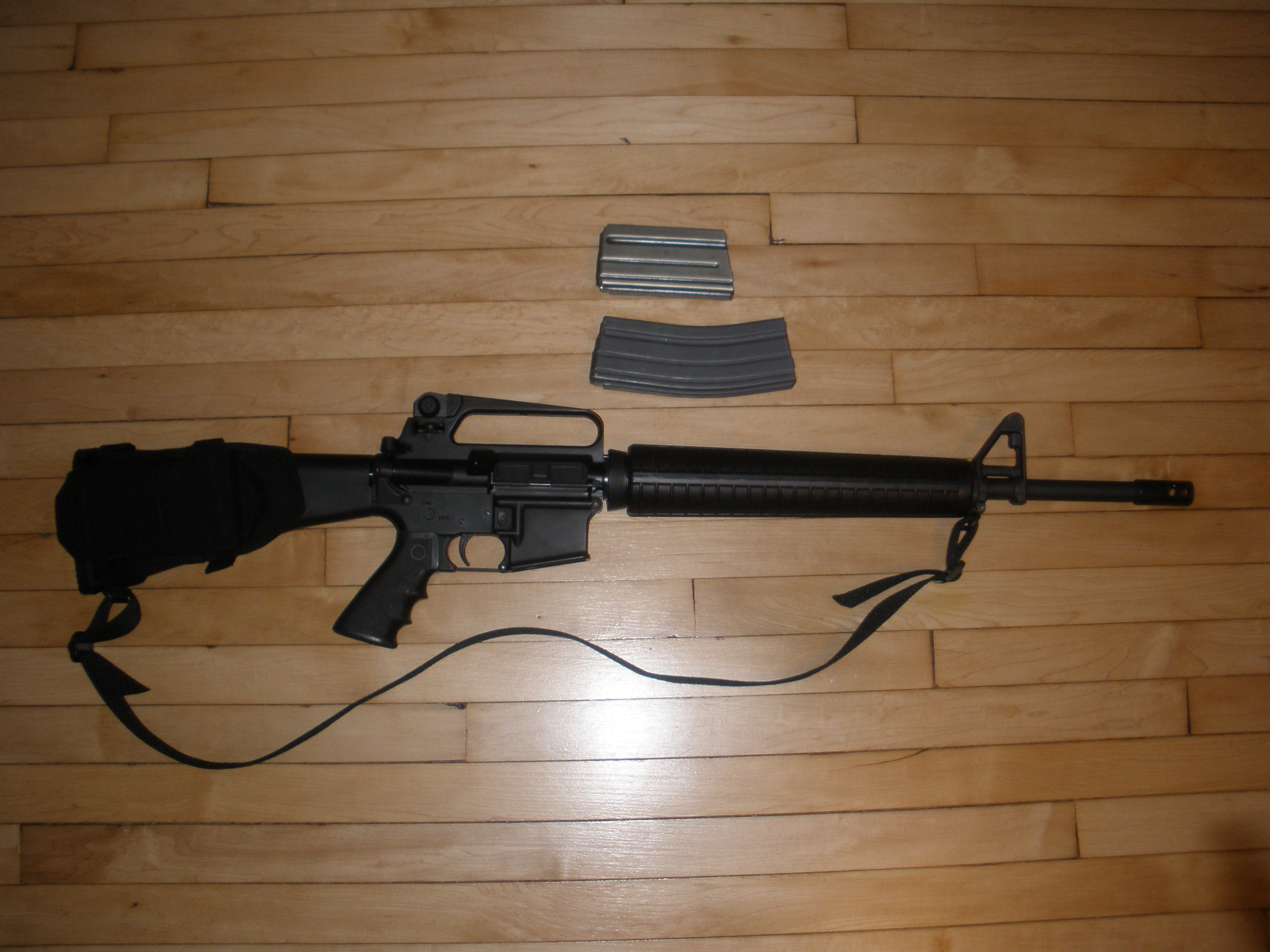
DPMS AR-15 style rifle with 20- & 30-round magazines

The company manufactures AR-15 style rifles chambered in .223 Remington/5.56×45mm NATO and AR-10 style rifles chambered in .308 Winchester and .260 Remington, among others.

The company attracted attention within the firearms industry with its version of the AR-10, the Panther LR-308, earning Shooting Illustrated's 2005 Golden Bullseye Award for "Rifle of the Year". In 2006, the Panther LR-308AP4 earned American Rifleman's Golden Bullseye Award for "Rifle of the Year". In 2008, DPMS introduced the LR-338 chambered in the .338 Federal cartridge.

== Production relocation ==
DPMS's St. Cloud production facility with 115 employees was closed and production has been moved to Remington's new non-union facility in Huntsville, Alabama. Remington's Ilion, New York, production facility closed down two production lines for their Bushmaster-branded AR-15 style rifle and R-1 1911-pattern pistol, and moved them to Huntsville. In 2014, Remington moved production of two gun lines and 150 jobs from New York to Alabama because of New York state's gun laws which banned the sale of those products in the state, and consolidated its production from six locations into Huntsville in order to increase efficiency, and reduce production and labor costs. The six companies being relocated were: Advanced Armament Corp of Lawrenceville, Georgia; Montana Rifleman of Kalispell, Montana; TAPCO; LAR Manufacturing of West Jordan, Utah; Para USA (formerly Para-Ordnance); and DPMS.

== Criminal use ==
=== 2015 San Bernardino attack ===
On December 2, 2015, Tashfeen Malik used a DPMS Panther Arms A-15 chambered in .223 Remington during the 2015 San Bernardino attack.
