= 2008–2016 United States ammunition shortage =

The 2008–2016 United States ammunition shortage was a shortage of civilian small arms ammunition in the United States that started in late 2008, and continued through most or all of 2010, with an additional shortage beginning in December 2012 and continuing throughout 2013.

The 2008 election of President Barack Obama triggered increased sales of both firearms and ammunition. USA Today reported that in Wyoming, the "run on bullets and reloading components" reached such a "frenzy" that a Cheyenne retailer began rationing sales and said she was also selling semiautomatic rifles as fast as she could put them on the shelves.

In December 2012, a new wave of panic buying was driven by the perceived likelihood of new firearm control laws being passed by Congress and state governments in response to the Sandy Hook Elementary School shooting. This led to a severe shortage of ammunition for most handgun calibers and some rifle calibers, especially the previously easy-to-find and cheaply priced .22 LR.

By August 2013, the rate of consumer purchases of most types of ammunition was receding, but prices continued to be above those found before December 2012 and ammunition for some calibers continued to be difficult to procure.

== The first shortage (2008–2010) ==
Most people attributed the ammunition shortage to reaction of gun owners and other groups to the election of U.S. President Barack Obama, claiming that these people feared more restrictive gun laws, ammunition taxes, and social decay. An October 2009 Gallup poll found that "Many Gun Owners Think Obama Will Try to Ban Gun Sales" completely, and similar themes were struck in an Associated Press report: "Shooting ranges, gun dealers, and bullet manufacturers say they have never seen such shortages." The Gallup report said, "although the survey did not ask directly whether those who hold the belief that Obama wants to ban gun sales have acted on that belief in terms of increased purchases of guns and ammunition, a connection between the belief and the behavior is a logical hypothesis."

== The second shortage (2012–2016) ==
After the Sandy Hook Elementary School shooting in Newtown, Connecticut on December 14, 2012, new attention was paid to firearms laws in America. The perpetrator had used a Bushmaster XM15-E2S semi-automatic rifle. Certain AR-15 rifles were considered assault weapons under the federal Assault Weapons Ban of 1994, which expired in 2004, and some are considered assault weapons in states that have such bans in force. In the wake of the shooting, there were calls for new or stricter gun control laws.

In response to concerns that the federal and state governments would limit the sale of firearms and ammunition, sales of firearms hit an all-time high in December 2012, with the FBI reporting that 2.8 million NICS background checks were performed that month, with the vast majority after the date of the shooting. A corresponding large increase in ammunition sales also occurred during this time, with some retailers reporting in January 2013 that they had already sold stock that had been expected to last for a couple of years, sometimes in the span of a single day.

On April 17, 2013, the main Congressional action introduced after the shooting, the Manchin-Toomey amendment, failed in the Senate, marking the end of the strongest push to implement new firearms laws on a federal level. However, many states passed new firearms restrictions, such as Colorado, Connecticut, Maryland, and New York. Regardless, the massive increase in ammunition sales earlier in the year had severely limited the continued availability of these products in the market, with many ammunition manufacturers unable to keep up with the demand even after running 24/7 shifts at all of their factories. Additionally, despite the defeat of the federal bill, a significant number of firearms owners remained concerned about the possibility of future actions to limit the availability of certain firearms and ammunition, and continued to accumulate ammunition well into the later parts of 2013.

The clearest explanation of the problem, according to The Motley Fool, comes from Hornady Manufacturing's president, Steve Hornady:

People walk into the store, they don't see as much as they want so they take everything they can get. The next guy who comes in can't get anything, so he panics. ...this shortage] is purely a consumer driven shortage.

In 2016, certain calibers of ammunition, most notably .22 long rifle, were still reported as being in short supply.

== Response by manufacturers and distributors ==
Remington Arms Chief Executive Officer Ted Torbeck said "Since the U.S. presidential election, demand for (ammunition) has risen amidst concerns that the new administration will further restrict the use or purchase of firearms and ammunition and levy additional taxes on these products. Since that time we have responded by ramping up production, providing for additional employee overtime, establishing additional production shifts, and expanding our supply chain, none of which has required significant capital." However, in August 2013 Remington broke ground on a $32 million expansion of their ammunition plant in Lonoke, Arkansas.

Due to the very small profit margins on .22 caliber ammunition, manufacturers could not justify the costs they would incur by expanding production capacity.

In response to the shortage, some ammunition distributors reduced shipments to individual stores. Some retailers raised prices substantially. Nevertheless, some merchants reported increases in sales between 15% and 100%.

== Price increase ==
Between 2007 and 2012 the dollar value of ammunition doubled in price in most cases. In certain areas, the price of .22LR caliber ammo increased from 5¢ per round to upwards of 12¢ per round. Following the Sandy Hook shooting in 2012, public concerns on how government officials would legislate bans on specific calibers led to an increase in demand for ammo, motivating the price to increase, the continuation of which held some responsibility for the ammo price bubble that was created.

=== Gray market ===
The increased demand for ammunition not only contributed to inflated prices but also created an opportunity for gray market vendors to arise. Many of these vendors were able to obtain ammunition in bulk and sell at an exorbitant price. The increase in gray market sales fed public suspicion that government was intervening with ammo supply, since ammo that was once easy to come by was now barren.

The shortage resulted in adverse consequences for law enforcement agencies. Several police departments delayed or reduced firearm training programs for officers. However, the U.S. military was unaffected by the shortage, as its ammunition is produced by dedicated plants.

== See also ==
- 2020–present United States ammunition shortage
- Arms Trade Treaty
- Barack Obama social policy#Gun policy
