= Bushmaster M4-type Carbine =

Carbine based on the AR-15 platform

Bushmaster M4-type carbine
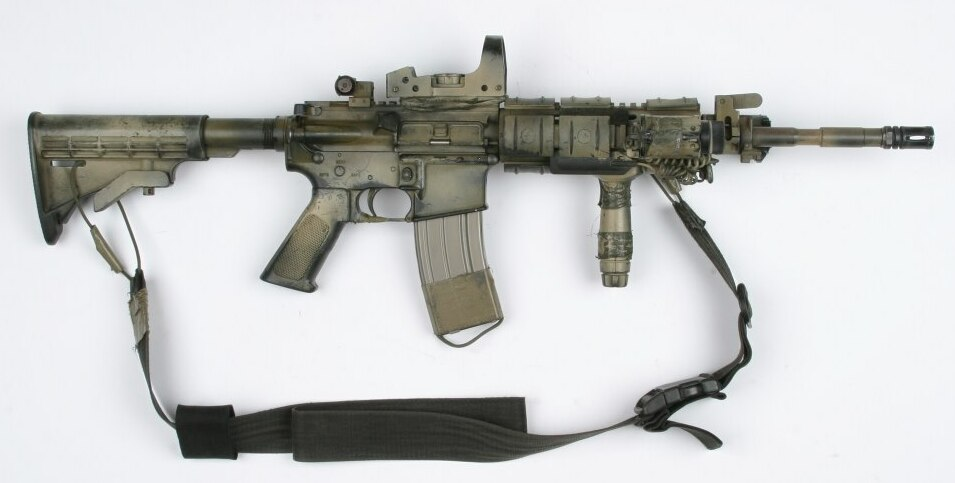
- Czech Bushmaster M4A3 BMAS
- Type: Assault rifle Carbine; Semi-automatic carbine (M4gery)
- Place of origin: United States

Service history
- Wars: War in Afghanistan (2001–2021); War in Iraq (2003–2011)

Production history
- Manufacturer: Bushmaster Firearms International

Specifications
- Mass: 2.82 kg (6.22 lb)
- Length: 882.7 mm (34.75 in)
- Barrel length: 406.4 mm (16 in)
- Cartridge: .223 Remington; 5.56×45mm NATO; 6.8mm Remington SPC; 7.62×39mm
- Action: Gas-operated, closed rotating bolt, Stoner bolt and carrier piston
- Rate of fire: 700–950 round/min (fully automatic)
- Effective firing range: 300 m
- Feed system: STANAG magazines
- Sights: Iron sights or various optics

The Bushmaster M4 or M4A3 is a semi-automatic or select-fire carbine size assault rifle manufactured by Bushmaster Firearms International, modeled on the AR-15. It is one of the Bushmaster XM15 line of rifles and carbines.

== Design ==
The M4 Type Carbine is a copy of the Colt M4 carbine. The semi-automatic version is marketed to the U.S. civilian market in compliance with the National Firearms Act. A select fire variant can be ordered by military or law enforcement organizations with three-round burst or fully automatic capability.

The rifle's caliber is .223 Remington/5.56×45mm NATO, and the barrel is hard chrome lined in both the bore and chamber. Unlike the current Colt M4 Carbine which features a four-position telescopic stock, the Bushmaster has a six-position stock. It is compatible with most standard AR-15 parts, can mount various attachments such as options on its picatinny rails and has the ability to accept all AR-15/M16 type STANAG magazines.

The standard M4 Type Carbine features a permanently fixed "Izzy" flash suppressor attached to a 14.5 in (370 mm) barrel, which brings the barrel to a total length of 16 in (410 mm). Bushmaster also produces the Patrolman's Carbine variant which features the more common removable "bird cage" flash suppressor, attached to a 16 in (410 mm) barrel, bringing the total barrel length to 17.5 in (440 mm). Both of these comply with current U.S. federal law which states a minimum 16 in (410 mm) barrel for a rifle. There is also a military M4 Type Carbine which comes with a 14.5 in (370 mm) barrel and a removable "bird cage" flash suppressor.

An M4 Type Post-Ban Carbine was developed for the 1994 United States Federal Assault Weapons Ban requirements. Since the ban expired in 2004, this rifle has essentially been replaced by the M4A2 and M4A3. Some states in the U.S. have kept these laws, so the rifle is still being produced.

=== Legal issues ===
A trademark dispute between Bushmaster and Colt's Manufacturing Company concerned the use of the "M4" name. The M4 was developed and produced for the United States government by Colt, which had an exclusive contract to produce the M4 family of weapons until 2009. Several other manufacturers, including Bushmaster, offer M4-like firearms, nicknamed "M4geries." Colt previously held a U.S. trademark on the term "M4."

In April 2004, Colt filed a lawsuit against Bushmaster and Heckler & Koch, claiming acts of trademark infringement, trade dress infringement, trademark dilution, false designation of origin, false advertising, patent infringement, unfair competition, and deceptive trade practices. Heckler & Koch later settled out of court. On December 8, 2005, a District court judge in Maine granted a summary judgment in favor of Bushmaster Firearms, dismissing all of Colt's claims except for false advertising. On the latter claim, Colt could not recover monetary damages. The court also ruled that "M4" was now a generic name, and that Colt's trademark should be revoked.

== Users ==
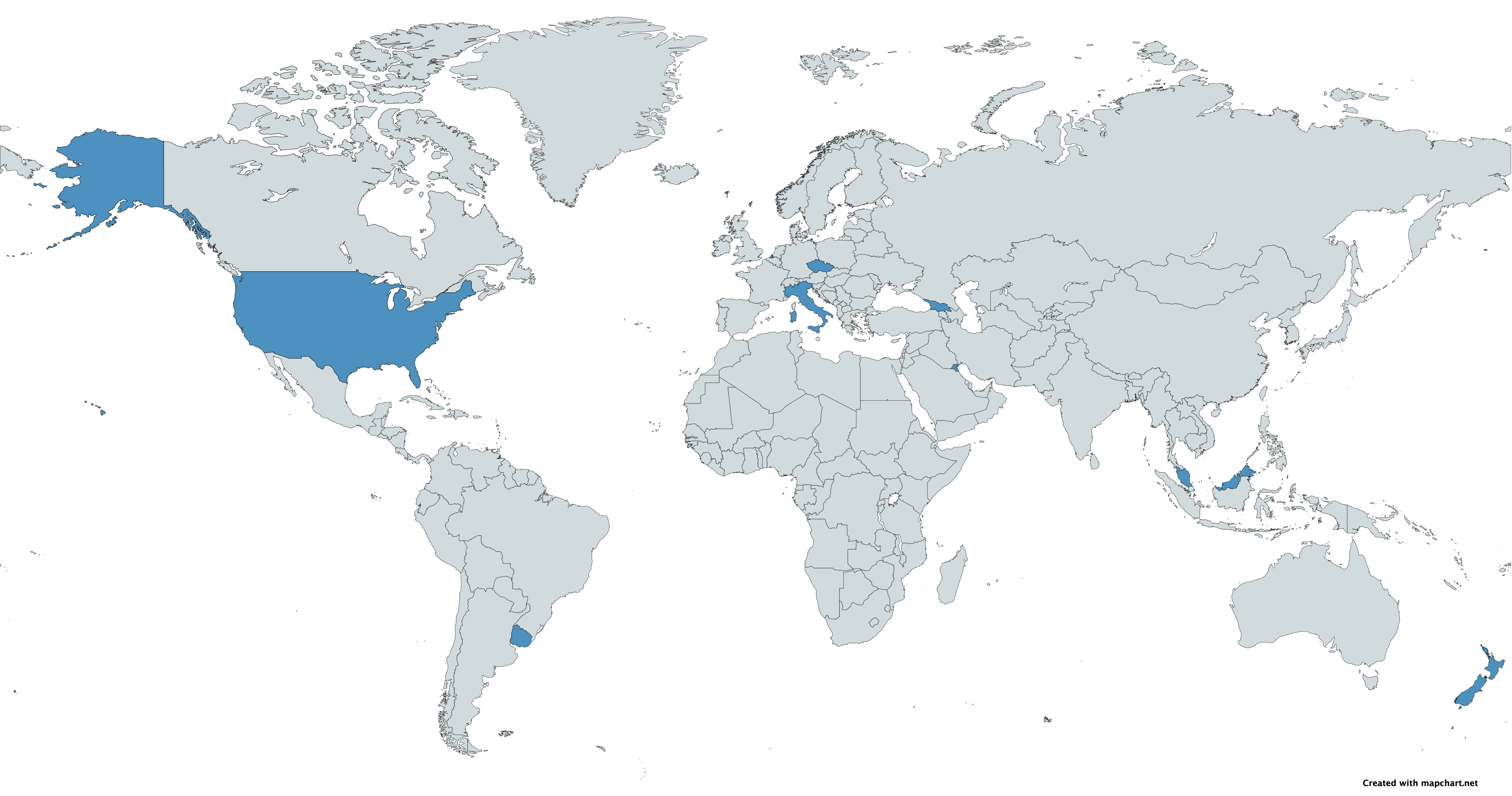
A map with users of the Bushmaster M4 in blue.

- Czech Republic: The Bushmaster M4A3 B.M.A.S. is used by special forces units of the Czech Armed Forces. These rifles are usually seen with an M203 grenade launcher. The 601st Special Forces Group is armed with the M4A3.
- Georgia: Used by the Georgian Army, some taken by Russian troops after the Russo-Georgian War.
- Italy: Used by NOCS.
- Kuwait: Used by the Kuwait 25th Commando Brigade.
- Malaysia: Used by Royal Malaysian Customs
- New Zealand: New Zealand Police (including Armed Offenders Squad and Special Tactics Group), replaced the Remington Model 7 as their standard-issue rifle.
- Russia: Captured from Georgia after Russo-Georgian War. Reportedly in use with Alpha Group.
- United States
  - Amtrak Police Department: Awarded a contact for 100 Bushmaster M4-type Patrolman's carbines in 2011.
  - Cambridge Police Department (Massachusetts)
- Uruguay

== Gallery ==
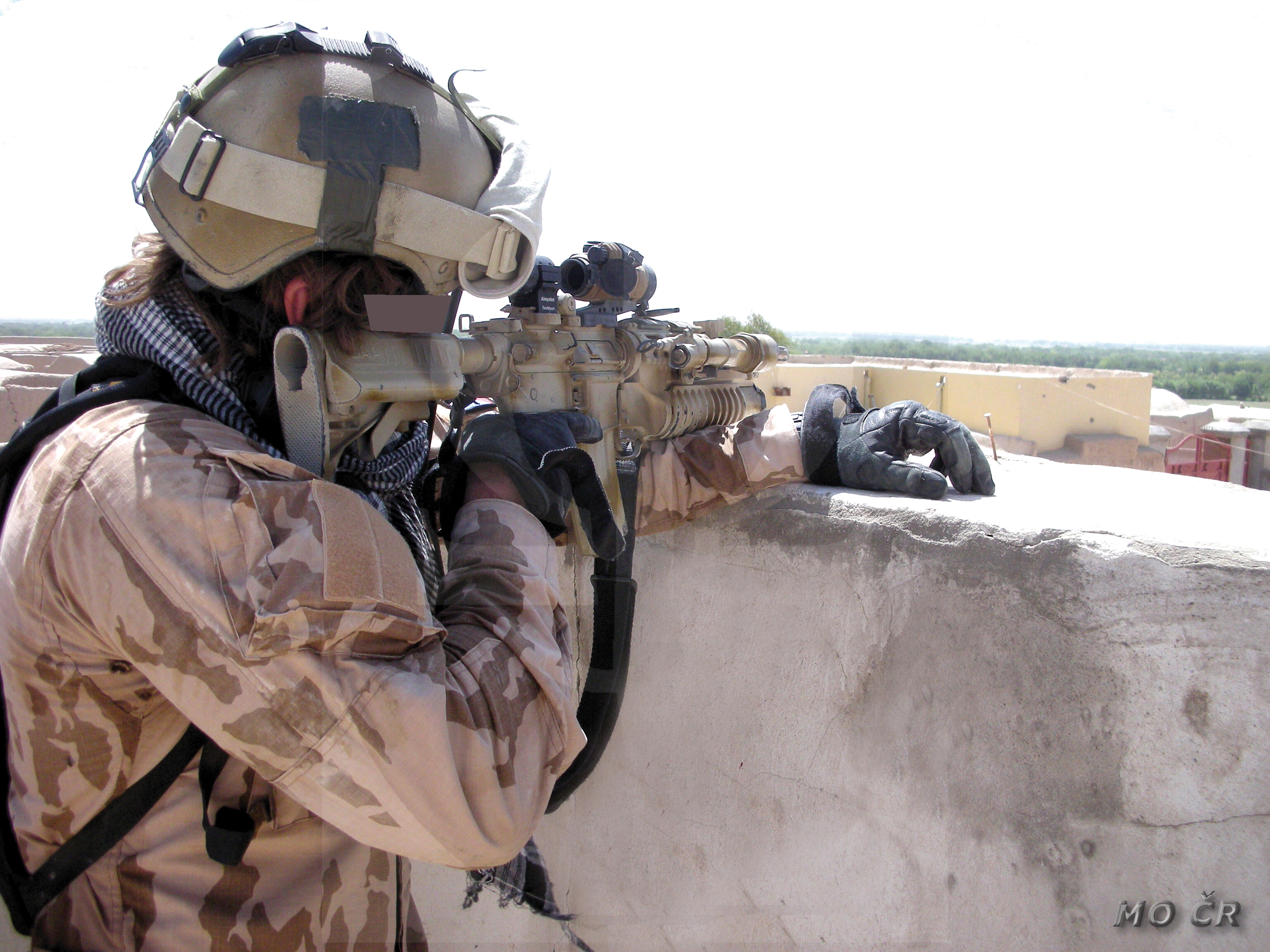
Czech Special Operations soldier in Afghanistan with a Bushmaster M4A3.

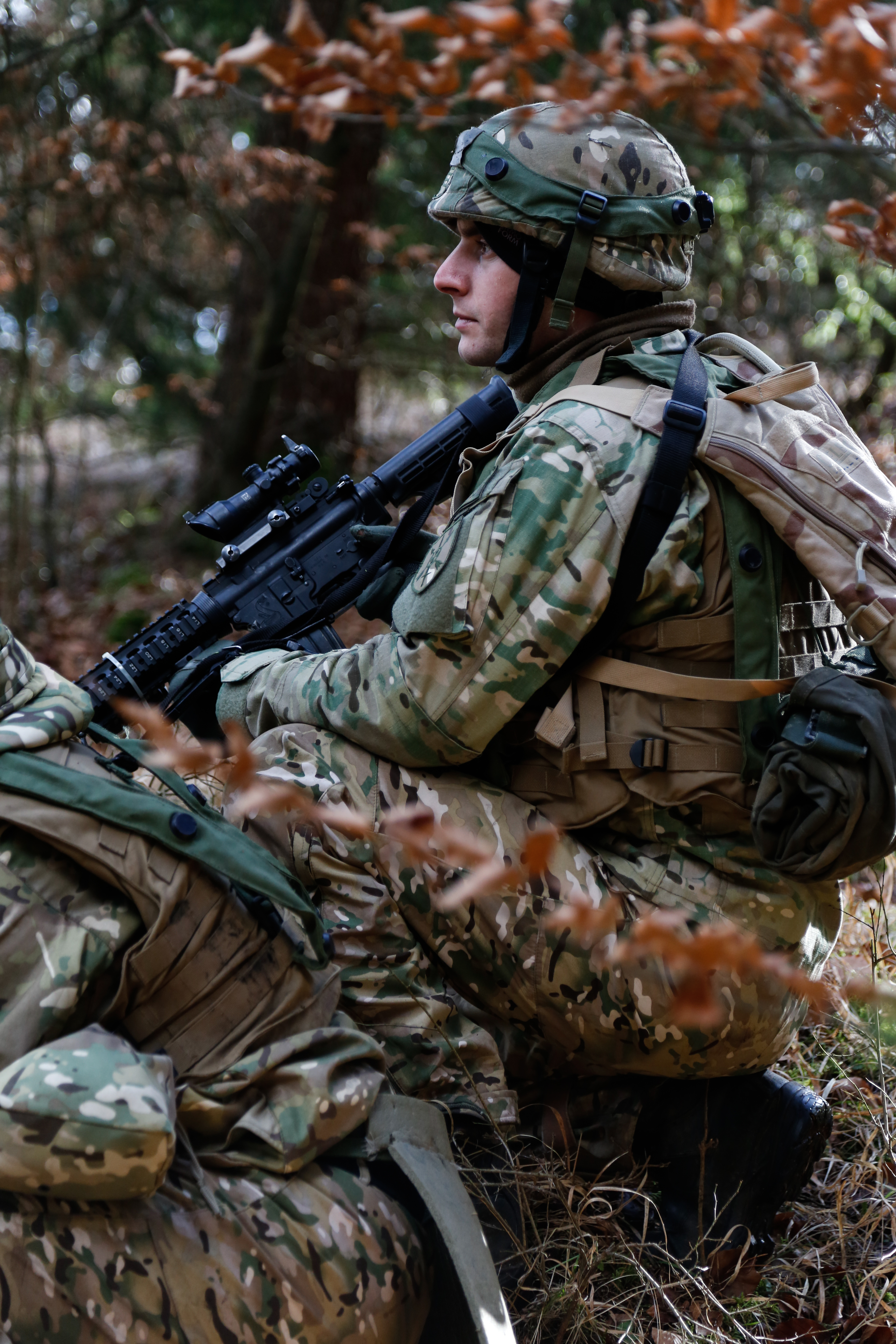
A Georgian soldier with a Bushmaster M4.

== Bibliography ==
- Neville, Leigh (2017). European Counter-Terrorist Units. Osprey. ISBN 978-1472825278.
- Neville, Leigh (2019). The Elite: The A–Z of Modern Special Operations Forces. Oxford: Osprey Publishing. ISBN 978-1472824295.
