= Remington SR-8 =

- Type: Sniper rifle
- Place of origin: United States

Production history
- Manufacturer: Remington Arms
- Produced: Cancelled in prototype stage
- No. built: 10 made only 1 owned outside of Remington

Specifications
- Mass: 15.75 lb (7.14 kg)
- Length: 47 in (1,193.8mm)
- Barrel length: 27 in (685.8mm)
- Caliber: .338 Lapua
- Action: Bolt-action
- Feed system: 5-round detachable box magazine
- Sights: Prototype fitted with Leupold Mk4 M1 16x

The Remington SR-8 was a prototype sniper rifle developed by Remington Arms. It was originally developed for the Italian Army, and was designed to shoot the .338 Lapua cartridge. The design of the rifle is based on the Remington Model 700, with the trigger assembly and design taken largely from the M24. The ejector design had to be modified from that of the standard Model 700 to allow for the larger rim of the .338 Lapua cartridge.

It is used in a popular free online game called Urban Terror, and in the Wolfenstein: Enemy Territory mod TrueCombat:Elite.
