= Remington Model 5 =

- Type: Bolt-action rifle
- Place of origin: United States/Serbia

Production history
- Designed: 77-89-6900
- Manufacturer: Zastava Arms
- Produced: 2006–2008

Specifications
- Mass: 6.75 lb (3.06 kg)
- Length: 40.75 in (103.5 cm)
- Barrel length: 22 in (56 cm)
- Cartridge: .22 LR, .22 WMR, .17 HMR
- Action: Bolt-action
- Effective firing range: 328 ft (100 m)
- Feed system: 5-round magazine
- Sights: Open sights standard

The Remington Model 5 is a rimfire bolt-action rifle introduced in 2006 by Remington Arms. The barrel and action are manufactured in Serbia by the Zastava Arms company, and the rifle is assembled in the United States with a laminated wood stock. It was advertised as being a "more economical, Serbian-made version of the discontinued Remington Model 504." The stock is made from a brown laminate and has a basic rubber recoil pad. The rifle also comes standard with an adjustable rear sight but can also accept a scope mount.
