= Remington Model 12 =

American Rifle

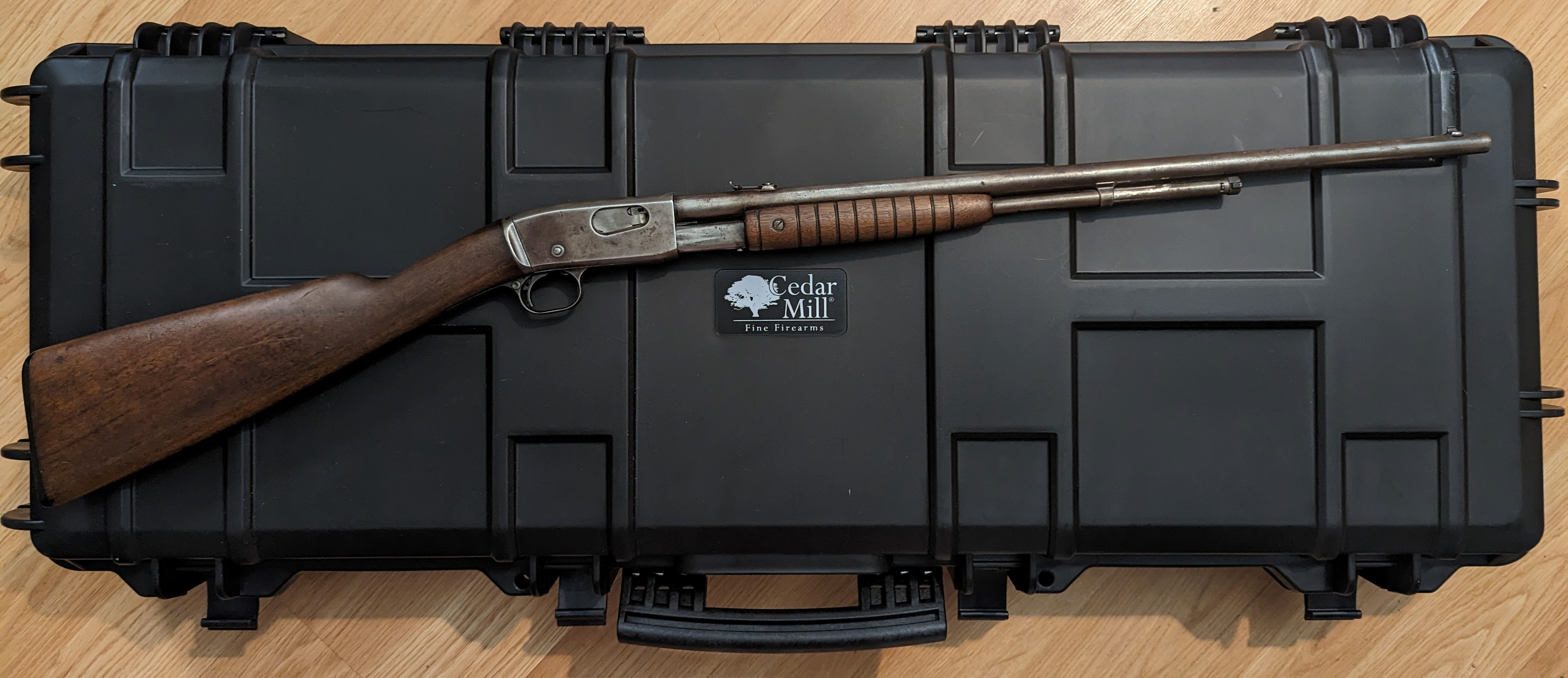
- Type: Rifle

Production history
- Designer: John Pedersen
- Manufacturer: Remington Arms
- Produced: 1909–1936
- No. built: ~832,000

The Remington Model 12 is a slide-action takedown rifle designed by John Pedersen and produced by the Remington Arms Company from 1909 to 1936.

The Model 12 is chambered in .22 Caliber Rimfire and accepts Short, Long, and Long Rifle cartridges, with a tubular magazine capacity of 14, 11, and 10 rounds respectively. S Grade variants of the rifle are chambered for the proprietary .22 Remington Special cartridge, which is functionally identical to the .22 Winchester Rimfire cartridge.

== Model 12B ==
The Model 12B "Gallery Special" was designed for use in shooting galleries, and can only fire .22 Short cartridges.
