= Remington Model 798 =

- Type: Bolt-action rifle
- Place of origin: United States; Serbia

Service history
- In service: N/A
- Used by: Mainly hunters
- Wars: N/A

Production history
- Manufacturer: Remington Arms
- Produced: 2006–2008

Specifications
- Mass: 7 lb (3.2 kg)
- Length: 42.25–46.25 in (107.3–117.5 cm)
- Barrel length: 22–26 in (56–66 cm)
- Caliber: .243 Win; .270 Win; .300 Win Mag; .308 Win; .30-06 Springfield; .375 H&H Mag; .458 Win Mag; 7mm Remington Magnum
- Action: Bolt-action
- Sights: None, has mounting points for a scope

The Remington Model 798 is a bolt-action rifle that was sold by Remington Arms from 2006 until 2008. The gun was made as a hunting rifle. It is composed of an imported Zastava Arms barreled action assembled with a laminated stock after import to the United States. It is based on a Mauser 98 action. It is chambered for .243 Winchester, .308 Winchester, .30-06 Springfield, .270 Winchester, 7mm Remington.Magnum, .300 Winchester.Magnum, .375 H&H Magnum and .458 Winchester Magnum It is drilled and tapped for scope mounts. It can have a barrel length of 22, 24 or 26 inches. It weighs 7 pounds, and has a brown laminated stock. The standard variant costs $599, and the Magnum versions can cost anything between $638 and $839. This is an all-steel, controlled-feed action using a flat-bottom receiver with an integral recoil lug, one-piece bolt with dual locking lugs plus a third safety lug and a bolt guide, full-length extractor, solid steel one-piece bottom iron/magazine box/trigger guard, hinged magazine floor plate, and all of the usual Mauser 98 deluxe features.
