= Remington-Beals Pocket Revolver =

19th-century handgun

- Type: Revolver
- Place of origin: United States

Service history
- In service: 1857–1873
- Used by: United States; Confederate States
- Wars: American Civil War; American Indian Wars

Production history
- Designer: Fordyce Beals
- Designed: 1856-1857
- Manufacturer: Remington Arms
- Produced: 1857 to 1860
- No. built: About 7,500
- Variants: 3

Specifications
- Cartridge: Powder & ball or Paper cartridge with conical bullet
- Caliber: .31
- Action: Single-action
- Feed system: 5 round cylinder
- Sights: Fixed Post, Notched Top Strap

Remington-Beals Pocket Revolver was the first percussion revolver produced by Remington & Sons in 1857. Three successive models were produced in 1857–1860.

== Background ==
Founded in 1816 in Ilion, New York by a blacksmith named Eliphalet Remington, by 1856. Remington & Sons was the preeminent long rifle factory in the United States, producing military rifles for the US government since 1845. The expiration of Samuel Colt’s U.S. patents in 1857 afforded the Remingtons the opportunity to start their own revolver production. As the company had had little experience in the production of pistols, they hired an expert designer, Fordyce Beals, who had previously designed a revolver for Eli Whitney’s factory in 1854. Beals refined his earlier models to provide Remington with his first revolver, Remington-Beals Pocket Revolver, which was patented on May 26, 1857.

== Models ==
In 1857 the 1st Model Remington-Beals Pocket Revolvers appeared on the US market. However, sales were disappointing, and Remington followed with two more improved models of the pistol, the last mounting an integral loading lever. Despite these improvements, the only real advantage of the Remington-Beals over well established Colt's pocket revolvers was in its solid-frame design. So, in 1860 Remington ceased the production. It was not until the outbreak of the American Civil War that Remington started revolver production on a large scale, with Remington Army Model in 1861.

=== 1st Model Remington-Beals Revolver ===
The first model Remington-Beals was a solid frame, single-action, five-shot, caliber .31 pistol with a 3-inch octagonal barrel. As it lacked the loading lever found on Colt's pistols, a bullet seater was included and had to be carried separately. The pistol was also fitted with grips made of hard rubber, known at the time as gutta percha, very modern for the time. Cylinder turning mechanism was mounted on the left outside frame. Approximately 5,000 were manufactured in 1857 and 1858 before transitioning to the 2nd Model.

=== 2nd Model Remington-Beals Revolver ===
It was a spur trigger, .31-caliber, 5-shot percussion revolver, with 3" octagonal barrel and squared rubber grip. Approximately 1,000 were manufactured between 1858 and 1860.

=== 3rd Model Remington-Beals Revolver ===
A .31-caliber 5-shot percussion revolver, with 4" octagonal barrel. Unlike its predecessors, it had a loading lever mounted under the barrel. Approximately 1,500 were manufactured in 1859 and 1860.

== Literature ==
- Ware, Donald L. (2007). Remington army and navy revolvers, 1861-1888. Albuquerque: University of New Mexico Press. ISBN 978-0-8263-4280-5. OCLC 80020165.
