= Remington V3 =

- Type: Semi-automatic shotgun
- Place of origin: United States

Production history
- Manufacturer: Remington Arms
- Unit cost: MSRP: $995 at introduction
- Produced: 2015–present
- Variants: Field Sport, Pro, Tactical

Specifications
- Mass: 7.25 pounds (3.29 kg) (28")
- Length: 47 or 49 in (119 or 124 cm) (26" or 28")
- Barrel length: 26 or 28 in (66 or 71 cm); 18.5 or 22 in (47 or 56 cm) on Tactical models
- Cartridge: 12 gauge (up to 3" length)
- Action: Semi-automatic gas-operated
- Feed system: Tube magazine 3+1 rounds; 6+1 or 8+1 on Tactical models
- Sights: Front and middle beads

The Remington V3 is a gas-operated semi-automatic shotgun introduced by Remington Arms in 2015. It is chambered to use 12 gauge shells of 2 3/4 inches (7.0 cm) or 3 inches (7.6 cm) in length. It was recognized as an editor's choice by Sports Afield in 2015.

== Design ==
The V3 uses Remington's patented gas-operated reloading system found in the Versa Max. The chamber that holds a shell when it is fired has a series of holes that regulate gas flow; shorter shells expose more of the holes than longer shells. While their designs are similar, the V3 and the Versa Max share no internal parts. Compared to the Versa Max, the V3 is lighter in weight and is priced lower. The V3 features an enlarged loading port and oversized controls.

== Offerings ==
Remington offers various V3 models, some marketed as Field Sport and others as Pro. As of June 2020, Remington lists eight versions on their website:

- Pro: Waterfowl, Turkey
- Field Sport: Walnut, Black Synthetic, Realtree Timber, Mossy Oak Break-Up Country, Mossy Oak Blades, Mossy Oak NWTF Obsession

There are additionally two tactical offerings, the Tactical and Competition Tactical.
