= Remington Nylon 76 =

- Type: Lever-action rifle
- Place of origin: US

Production history
- Manufacturer: Remington Arms
- Produced: 1962–1965
- No. built: 26,927
- Variants: Nylon 76AB Apache Black; Nylon 76MB Mohawk Brown

Specifications
- Cartridge: .22LR
- Action: Locked-breech, lever action
- Feed system: 14 round tubular magazine

The Remington Nylon 76 "Trailrider" is the only lever action rifle known to have been made by Remington Arms and was billed as the world's fastest lever action rifle.

== Design ==
This gun has a locked-breech lever action, with a short stroke of only about thirty degrees. It was introduced by Remington Arms in 1962 and discontinued in 1965.

Approximately 26,927 of these rifles were made, and they originally retailed for $59.95.

Two grades of this rifle were available: The Nylon 76AB Apache Black (approximately 1600 were made of this type), and the Nylon 76MB Mohawk Brown. The Remington website states that there was a "standard" grade, but through correspondence with Remington, it was determined that this was a typo.

This rifle is chambered for a .22LR and has a tubular magazine that opens at the rear of the stock and holds 14 rounds.
