= 2020–present United States ammunition shortage =

The 2020–present United States ammunition shortage is the most recent of all the ammunition shortages in the United States. It arose out of the COVID-19 pandemic in the United States, the 2020 United States presidential election, and the George Floyd protests. The lack of sufficient ammunition for consumers in the United States is to some extent ongoing.

== History ==
The ammunition shortage began in 2020 and began to abate in 2022 and 2023.

== Causes ==
=== Demand ===
An estimated 8.4 million people bought firearms for the first time in 2020, according to an official of the National Shooting Sports Foundation, and they are also buying ammunition.

In March 2020, COVID-19 was declared a pandemic by WHO, followed by world leaders such as the US President. Firearm and ammunition sales have increased substantially since the pandemic. At least 3 million firearms were sold in the spring alone.

In response to protests, riots, and unrest after the murder of George Floyd, many started buying arms and ammunition.

The 2020 presidential election resulted in an election victory of the Democratic Party nominee Joe Biden. Biden has proposed multiple forms of gun control, such as ammunition magazine capacity limits, reinstating the federal assault weapon ban, universal background checks, and closing the gun show loophole. When Biden was vice president from 2009 to 2017, he and former president Barack Obama proposed the Assault Weapons Ban of 2013 following the Sandy Hook Elementary School shooting.

Retailers say many customers are buying more ammunition than they normally would, from fear of supplies running out. Resellers are also reportedly buying large amounts of ammunition and reselling it at higher prices to customers who are willing to pay more to obtain it during the shortage.

=== Supply ===
The pandemic reduced the production and import of certain raw materials, including lead, required to manufacture ammunition.

On July 28, 2020, Remington Outdoor Company filed for Chapter 11 bankruptcy protection. Vista Outdoor purchased Remington's ammunition plants and brands at auction in September 2020. Chris Metz, Vista Outdoor's chief executive officer, said of Remington's ammunition plant in Arkansas that "during the bankruptcy the plant was functioning at about 10% capacity before Vista Outdoor took over." In April 2021, Remington Ammunition announced that its Arkansas plant was back to running 24/7 at full capacity.

Ammunition is produced from a number of component parts such as bullets, cartridge cases, powders, and primers. While companies were more easily able to increase the production of bullets, cases, and powder producing primers is much more specialized and primer production is a niche in which only a few companies operate. Post-2020 this meant that primers were the primary bottleneck to increasing production to meet the increasing demand.

A nitrocellulose shortage, primarily because of the war in Ukraine and Chinese trade restrictions, has also impacted the ammunition shortage due to the chemical's use in propellants.

==== Accidents ====
On October 13, 2023, an explosion was reported at Hornady's primer manufacturing facility near Wood River, Nebraska.

== Effects ==
=== Pricing ===
As a result of the shortage ammunition prices increased significantly with major producers seeing significant profit margin increases as well. Some of the price increase is also attributable to manufacturers prioritizing premium lines of ammunition when faced with component shortages.

=== Industry investment ===
The increased demand along with the increased price led to significant investment in ammunition production capacity both from legacy ammunition manufacturers as well as from startups and small and medium companies which expanded into ammunition production for the first time.

The nitrocellulose shortage is being addressed through legislation, supply chain improvements at the Radford Army Ammunition Plant (the sole nitrocellulose manufacturing site in the US) and new producers such as Supply Energetics.
