= Remington Model 521 TL Junior =

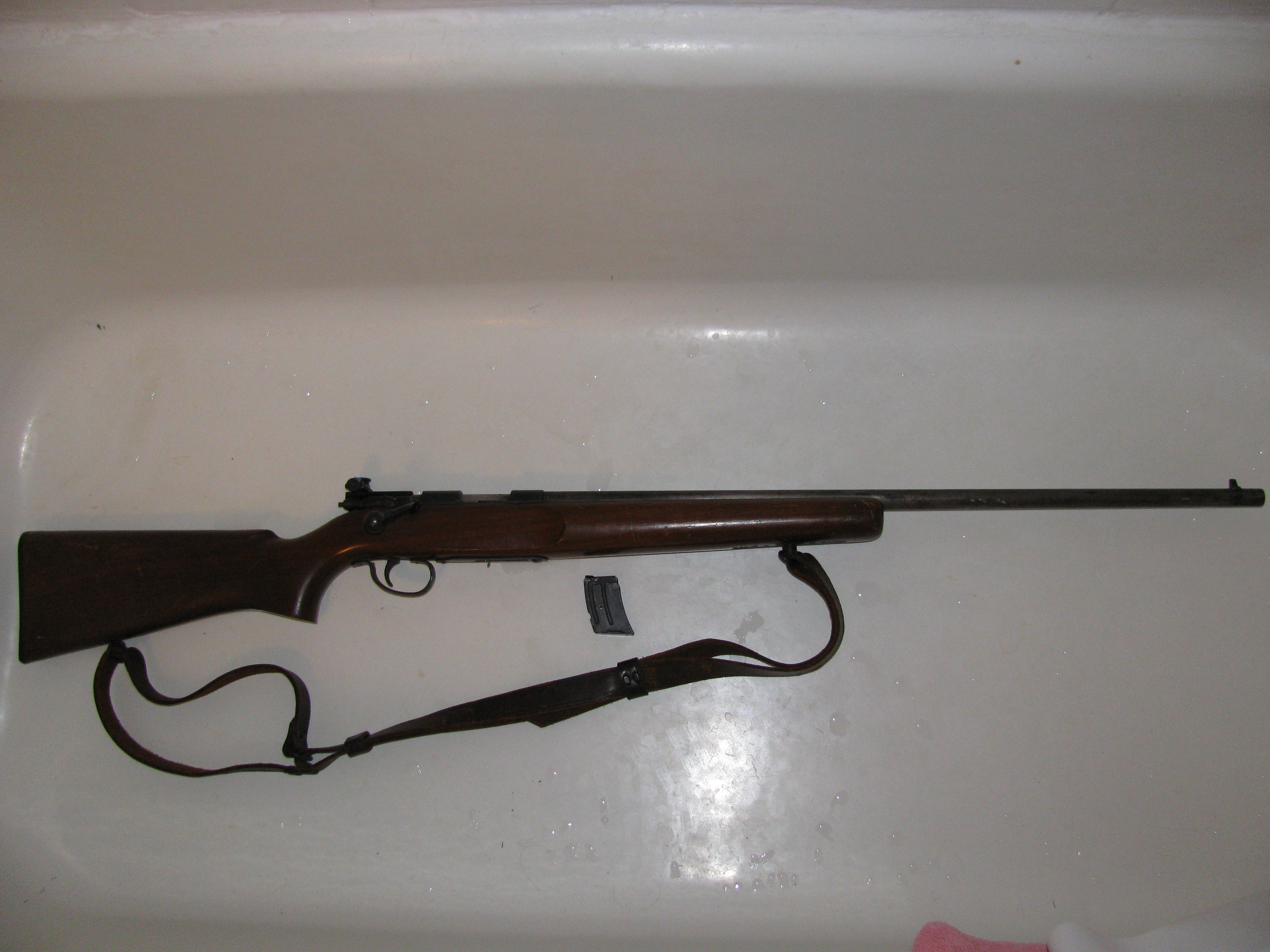
- Type: Bolt-action rifle
- Place of origin: United States

Production history
- Designer: Remington R&D
- Manufacturer: Remington Arms
- Produced: 1947–1969
- No. built: 66,338

Specifications
- Mass: 9 lb (4.1 kg)
- Barrel length: 24 in (61 cm)
- Cartridge: .22 Short, .22 LR, .22 Long
- Action: Bolt-Action
- Muzzle velocity: 123 metres per second (400 ft/s) .22 Long Rifle 1250 fps (about 400 m/sec)
- Effective firing range: 123 metres (135 yd)
- Feed system: 6-round magazine
- Sights: Lyman aperture

The Remington Model 521 TL Junior is a member of the Remington 500 series rifles. It is bolt action with a walnut stock and a 24 in (61 cm) barrel. It has a Lyman aperture rear sight that is adjustable for elevation and windage. The rifle takes a six-round magazine that fits flush with the bottom of the rifle.
