= Remington–Smoot No. 1 Revolver =

19th-century handgun

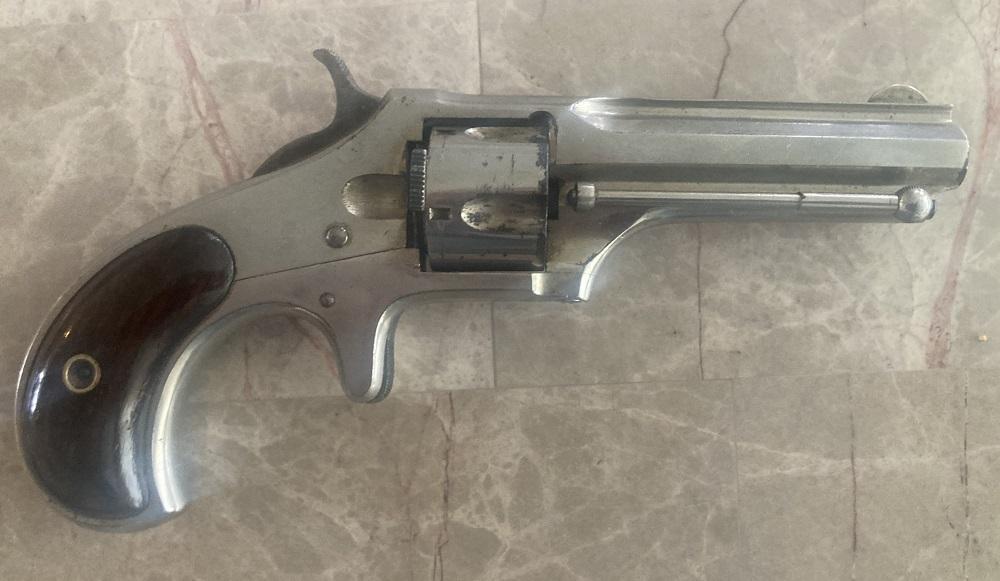
- Type: Revolver
- Place of origin: United States

Production history
- Designer: William Sydney Smoot
- Designed: 1873
- Manufacturer: Remington Arms
- Produced: 1875 to 1877
- No. built: About 3,000
- Variants: 3

Specifications
- Mass: 10 ounces
- Length: 6.5 inches
- Barrel length: 2.75 inches
- Width: 1 inch
- Height: 3.25 inches
- Cartridge: metallic rimfire cartridge
- Caliber: .30
- Action: Single-action
- Feed system: 5 round cylinder
- Sights: Fixed Post, Notched Top Strap

The Remington–Smoot No. 1 Revolver was a cartridge revolver produced by Remington & Sons in 1875–1877. Two successive models were produced.

== Models ==
In 1875 the Remington–Smoot No. 1 Revolvers appeared on the US market. The gun was patented in 1873. Approximately 3,000 No. 1 Revolvers were produced between 1875 and 1877. The No. 1 model was produced in caliber .30RF. The Remington-Smoot No. 2 Revolver was produced and sold from 1877 to 1885, with approximately 2,000 produced. The No. 2 Revolver was available in calibers .30RF and .32RF. The Remington-Smoot No.3 Revolver was produced in caliber .38RF. The No. 3 was produced from 1878 to 1888.

== Literature ==
- Ware, Donald L. (2007). Remington army and navy revolvers, 1861-1888. Albuquerque: University of New Mexico Press. ISBN 978-0-8263-4280-5. OCLC 80020165.
