= Remington Model 783 =

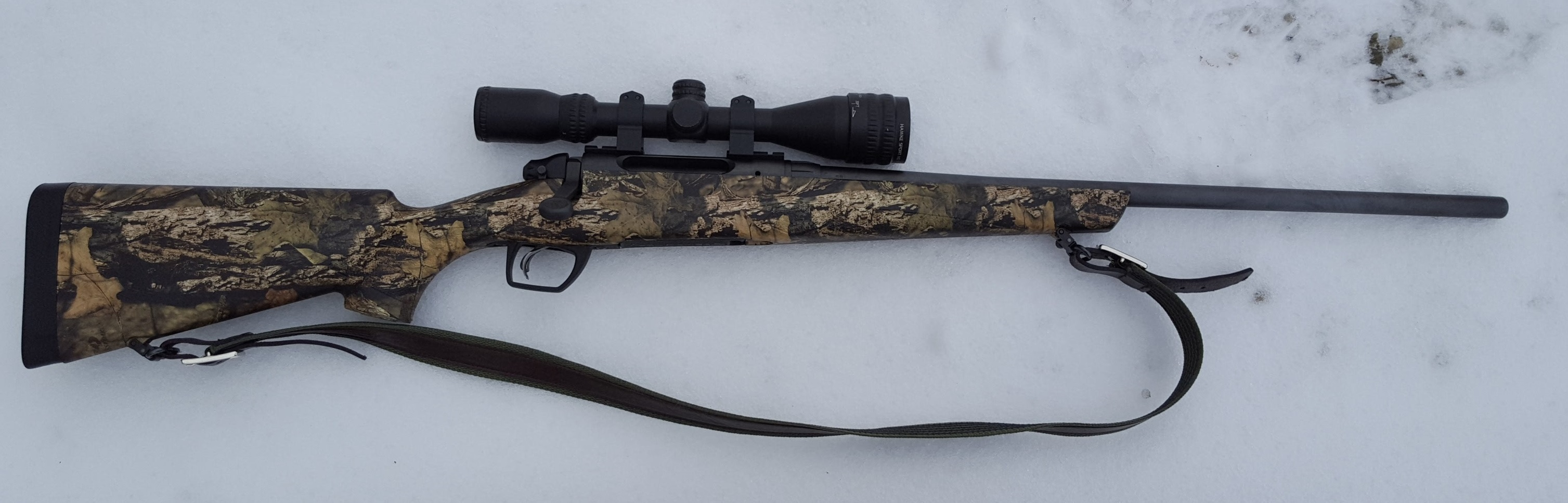
- Type: Rifle
- Place of origin: United States

Production history
- Manufacturer: Remington Arms
- Produced: 2013–present

Specifications
- Mass: 3.4 kg (7.5 lbs) empty without scope
- Length: 44.5 in (113 cm) in longest version
- Barrel length: 16.5, 20, 22 or 24 in
- Cartridge: Various (see section)
- Action: Bolt action, rotating bolt with 2 lugs
- Muzzle velocity: Varies (depending on caliber)
- Maximum firing range: Varies (depending on caliber)
- Feed system: 3-, 4-, or 5-round detachable box magazine
- Sights: Variable

The Remington Model 783 is a civilian bolt action hunting rifle built by Remington for the budget market. The rifle was launched in 2013 (which is where the "3" in 783 originates) and is considered a spiritual successor to the Remington Model 788 (which is where the "78" in 783 originates).

The mechanical design of the Model 783 is based upon the Marlin X7 rifle that was acquired by Remington in 2007. No parts are shared with the more expensive Remington Model 700 rifle.

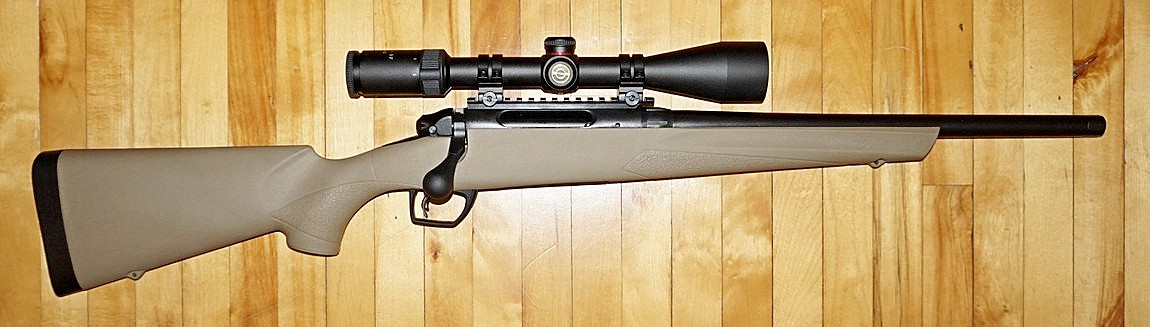
Remington 783 HB .308 Win 16.5 inch barrel

== Design ==
The rifle has innovative design features such as an adjustable trigger with finger safety in the trigger blade. Adjustment of the trigger pull is possible within 2.5 to 5 lbs. The floating bolt head and barrel-retaining nut, features pioneered by Savage in the models 340 (barrel nut), introduced in 1950, and the 110 bolt action (floating bolt head), introduced in 1958, are well-established and successful design elements. The black synthetic stock is made from plastic with a high nylon content making it more rigid than other budget stocks. To reduce the felt recoil a gel filled pad is used. For improved accuracy, the barrel is free floated and the action is pillar bedded. The small ejection port makes the receiver very rigid.

The detachable box magazine is made from a metal frame and carries 3-5 rounds depending on the cartridge. The carbon steel barrel is button-rifled and is available in lengths between 20 and 24" depending on the caliber. There are both long and short receivers available depending on the cartridge.

The bolt has forward dual-opposed lugs and is released from the receiver using a lever on its left side, the bolt can be removed with the safety on. The two position safety is located on the right side of the bolt and maneuvered with a thumb lever. On top of the receiver is four mounting holes for scope rails.

In 2017, the Model 783 was available with a new walnut stock and packaged with a 3-9x40 scope. This version also has screw-in swivel studs that allows for a bipod to be mounted on the stock.

== Cartridges ==
The Model 783 has been offered in the following calibers:

Caliber
.270 Winchester
.22-250 Remington
.223 Remington
.243 Winchester
6.5mm Creedmoor
.308 Winchester
.30-06 Springfield
7mm Remington Magnum
.300 AAC Blackout
.300 Winchester Magnum
.450 Bushmaster

== Reception ==
The Model 783 has received many positive reviews and is considered a good beginner's rifle. It has received praise for its accuracy and price, but criticism for its plastic feel.
