= Remington Model 504 =

- Type: Rifle
- Place of origin: United States

Production history
- Designer: Remington R&D
- Manufacturer: Remington Arms
- Produced: 2004–2007

Specifications
- Mass: 6 lb (2.7 kg)
- Barrel length: 20 in (51 cm); 22 in (56 cm)
- Cartridge: .22 LR, .17 HM2 or .17 HMR
- Barrels: 20"
- Action: Bolt with dual extractors
- Feed system: 5 round detachable magazine
- Sights: None, tapped receiver for scope-mount bases

The Remington Model 504 is a bolt-action rimfire rifle that can chamber .22 LR, .17 HM2 or .17 HMR cartridges. The gun is a replacement of the now obsolete Remington Model 541, and was itself replaced by the Remington Model 547 in 2007. The Model 504T was a target variant built in 2006 that differed from the original 504 in using a laminated wood stock with a raised comb, a target style forearm and a heavier barrel.
