= Remington 1911 R1 =

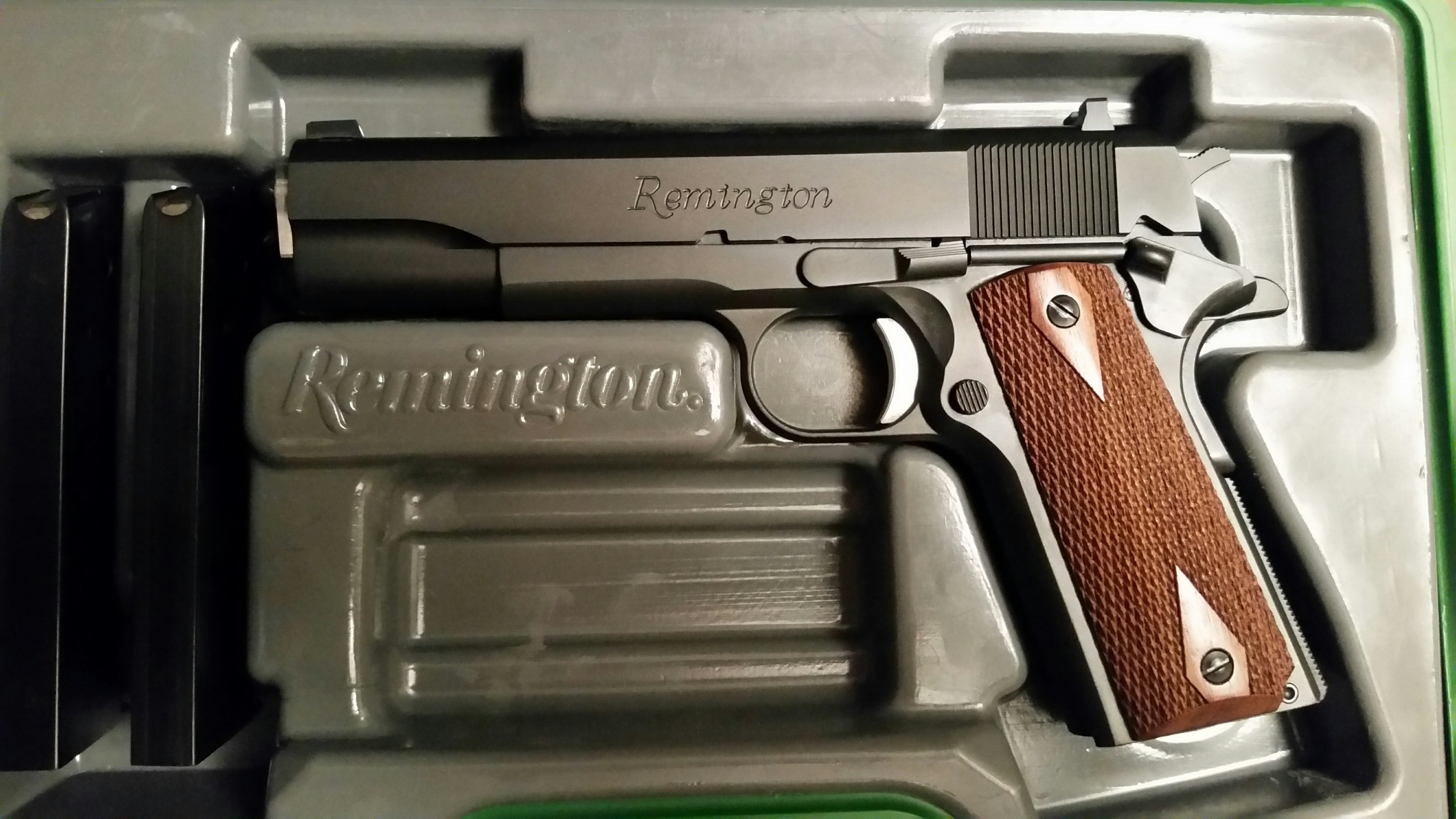
- Type: Semi-automatic pistol
- Place of origin: United States

Production history
- Manufacturer: Remington Arms
- Unit cost: $729.00
- Produced: 2010 – c. 2018

Specifications
- Mass: 38.5 oz (1,090 g)
- Length: 8.5 in (22 cm)
- Barrel length: 5 in (13 cm)
- Height: 5.5 in (14 cm)
- Caliber: .45 ACP
- Barrels: 1-16 Left Hand Twist
- Action: Short recoil operation (single action)
- Feed system: 7+1-round magazine
- Sights: Dovetail front and rear, 3 dot

The Remington 1911 R1 is a semi-automatic pistol modeled after the classic Colt 1911 which has served the US armed forces for over 100 years. Like the Colt 1911, the Remington 1911 is single action only, and has a grip safety and a manually operated thumb safety; it also has a Colt Series 80 style firing pin safety.

== History ==
In 1918, Remington Arms produced a 1911 style pistol modeled after the Colt 1911 after receiving a contract from the US government to produce the pistols.

== Variants ==
=== Model 1911 R1 Carry ===
Differing from the rest of the R1 lineup with their cast frames, the Carry models feature a fully de-horned forged carbon steel slide and frame along with Novak branded rear sight, Trijicon front sight, 25-LPI front strap and mainspring housing checkering, match grade stainless barrel with target crown, ambi safety, beavertail grip safety also with 25-LPI checkered memory bump, skeletonized aluminum match trigger, lowered and flared ejection port, enhanced hammer and cocobolo grips. The gun is currently offered in a 5-inch Government model and 4 1/4-inch Commander model, both chambered in .45 ACP and an MSRP of $1067.00 as of early 2018.

=== Model 1911 R1 Centennial ===
Features include a brass bead in the front sight, custom grips with a Remington medallion and a special 100-year anniversary engraving marking the 100 year anniversary of the 1911 pistol.

=== Model 1911 R1 Centennial Limited Edition ===
Features an anniversary engraving made with 24-kt gold banner on the slide. Also features a carbona blue finish and a 14-kt gold bead in the front sight.

=== Model 1911 R1 Enhanced ===
Features enhanced hammer and trigger, extended magazine release button, wider thumb safety as well as custom grips with thumb grooves. The sights are adjustable in the rear and have a red fiber-optic in front. It comes with two bumper-padded magazines, each with 8 round capacity.

=== Model 1911 R1 Enhanced Threaded Barrel ===
Same as the Enhanced but with a threaded barrel allowing for the attaching of a suppressor. Also has a taller front and rear sight for shooting with a suppressor.

=== Model 1911 R1 Stainless ===
Identical to the original except with a matte stainless steel frame, slide, and various small parts.
