= Remington Versa Max =

- Type: Semi-automatic shotgun
- Place of origin: United States

Production history
- Manufacturer: Remington Arms
- Unit cost: MSRP: $1485 (Synthetic or Tactical), $1088 (Sportsman)
- Produced: 2010 – c. 2020
- Variants: Sportsman, Tactical

Specifications
- Mass: 7.5 pounds (3.4 kg) (26")
- Length: 47 15/16 inches (121.8 cm) (26")
- Barrel length: 26 or 28 in (66 or 71 cm); tactical and turkey models 22 in (56 cm)
- Cartridge: 12 gauge (up to 3½" length)
- Action: Semi-automatic gas-operated
- Feed system: Tube magazine: 3+1 rounds (2+1 with 3½" shells); Tactical version 8+1 (10+1 with extension)
- Sights: Fiber-optic; bead on Sportsman

The Remington Versa Max, also styled as VERSA MAX, is a gas-operated semi-automatic shotgun introduced by Remington Arms in 2010. It is chambered to use 12 gauge shells of 2 3/4 inches (7.0 cm), 3 inches (7.6 cm), and 3 1/2 inches (8.9 cm) in length. It was named the shotgun of the year for 2011 by American Rifleman.

== Design ==
The Versa Max features a patented gas-operated reloading system that "self-regulates gas pressure, based on the length of the shell". The internal cup that holds a shell when it is fired has a series of holes that regulate gas flow; shorter shells expose more of the holes than longer shells. Remington states that the Versa Max "reduces 12 gauge recoil to that of a 20 gauge." The action of the Versa Max is a redesign of the Benelli M4.

== Offerings ==
The Versa Max Sportsman is a reduced-cost variant of the Versa Max. Differences include a bead sight rather than a fiber-optic sight, only one choke rather than five chokes, and reduced cosmetics.

As of June 2020, Remington listed seven versions on their website:

- Versa Max: Synthetic (no camouflage), Realtree AP HD Camo, Waterfowl Pro, Mossy Oak Duck Blind
- Versa Max Sportsman: Plain (no camouflage), Mossy Oak Duck Blind, Mossy Oak Turkey Camo

There were additionally two tactical offerings, the Tactical and Competition Tactical.
