= Remington Outdoor Company =

Defunct holding company

Remington Outdoor Company, Inc.
- Formerly: Freedom Group
- Company type: Private
- Industry: Firearms, defense
- Founded: 2007; 19 years ago
- Defunct: September 2020; 5 years ago
- Fate: Broken up following Chapter 11 bankruptcy
- Headquarters: Madison, North Carolina, United States
- Area served: Worldwide
- Products: Pistols, rifles, carbines, shotguns, ammunitions, clothing
- Brands: Remington; Barnes Bullets; Bushmaster; DPMS; Advanced Armament; Marlin Firearms; H & R Firearms; Para USA; The Parker Gun; Dakota Arms; Tapco; Storm Lake Barrels
- Revenue: ▲US$ 865.1 million (2016)
- Net income: ▲US$ 18.9 million (2016)
- Owner: Cerberus Capital Management
- Number of employees: >3,000
- Website: www.remingtonoutdoorcompany.com

Remington Outdoor Company, Inc. (ROC), formerly known as the Freedom Group, was an American firearms manufacturer and holding company. The company had notable brands under its umbrella, such as Bushmaster, DPMS, Remington and Marlin.

== History ==
In June 2007, a private equity firm, Cerberus Capital Management, acquired Remington Arms for $370 million, including $252 million in assumed debt. It became part of the company's Freedom Group. Remington was millions of dollars in debt and did not report a profit from 2003 to 2005. In 2015, the Freedom Group was renamed Remington Outdoor Company.

In 2015, the families of nine victims of the 2012 Sandy Hook Elementary School shooting—in which 20 children and six adult staff were fatally shot—and a teacher who was shot and survived, filed a wrongful death lawsuit against Remington, a firearms wholesaler, and a firearms dealer, seeking a jury trial to recover unspecified damages. In 2016, the suit was dismissed by the Connecticut Superior Court citing the immunity provided to firearms manufacturers by the federal Protection of Lawful Commerce in Arms Act of 2005.

On August 15, 2017, James Marcotuli announced his resignation as CEO, citing personal reasons. On October 25, the company announced that Anthony Acitelli would succeed Marcotuli.

Remington filed for Chapter 11 bankruptcy protection in March 2018, having accumulated over $950 million in debt. Remington exited bankruptcy in May, less than two months after filing for protection under Chapter 11 laws. Remington's quick exit from bankruptcy was due to a pre-approved restructuring plan that was supported by 97% of its creditors.

The Sandy Hook-related lawsuit was delayed by Remington's 2018 bankruptcy. On March 14, 2019, the Connecticut Supreme Court ruled that the suit's wrongful marketing claim could proceed under Connecticut's Unfair Trade Practices Law. The Connecticut Supreme Court decision was "a significant development in the long-running battle between gun control advocates and the gun lobby" according to The New York Times and "groundbreaking" according to The Washington Post.

In July 2020, Remington again filed for Chapter 11 bankruptcy protection. In a bankruptcy auction in September 2020, Remington was sold in parts to:

- Vista Outdoor: the Lonoke ammunition business and certain intellectual property, subsequently operating as Remington Ammunition
- Roundhill Group: the non-Marlin firearms business, later structured under RemArms, LLC, which licenses the Remington name from Vista Outdoor and operates Remington Firearms
- Sierra Bullets: the Barnes ammunition business
- Sturm, Ruger & Co.: the Marlin firearms business
- JJE Capital Holdings: the DPMS, H&R, Stormlake, AAC and Parker brands
- Franklin Armory: the Bushmaster brand and some related assets
- Sportsman's Warehouse: the Tapco brands
- Dakota Arms: Parkwest Arms

In February 2022, families of the Sandy Hook victims reached a $73 million settlement with Remington, (Note: As this settlement was reached following the breakup of Remington Outdoor Company, it's unclear which specific entity the settlement was reached with.) over how the firearm used by the shooter had been marketed.
