= Bushmaster Firearms International =

American firearms manufacturer

Bushmaster Firearms International, LLC
- Industry: Arms industry
- Founded: 1973; 53 years ago
- Founder: Richard Dyke
- Headquarters: Minden, Nevada
- Key people: Sun Naegele, CEO
- Products: Firearms
- Parent: Crotalus Holdings, Inc. (Franklin Armory)
- Website: www.bushmaster.com

Bushmaster Firearms International, LLC, is an American firearm manufacturer and distributor. The company's product line revolves around semi-automatic pistol and rifle variants of the M4/AR-15 design. It is currently in full operation and is based in Minden, Nevada. Bushmaster Firearms is unrelated to the M242 Bushmaster autocannon, which was produced by Northrop Grumman.

== History ==
Bushmaster Firearms is the successor of Gwinn Firearms, founded by Mack Gwinn Jr. upon his return from the Vietnam War. It went bankrupt, was purchased by Richard Dyke in 1976, and moved from Bangor, Maine, to Windham, Maine. Quality Products Company acquired it in 1990.

In 2002, Bushmaster and a Bushmaster dealer were the subjects of a civil lawsuit brought by two survivors and six families of victims of the October 2002 D.C. sniper attacks, which resulted in the deaths of ten and injuries to three people. On September 8, 2004, Bushmaster agreed to pay $550,000 of a $2.5 million settlement in the lawsuit and Bull's Eye Shooter Supply of Tacoma, Washington, the Bushmaster dealer from whom one of the perpetrators said he had shoplifted the rifle, paid $2 million. The company cited mounting legal fees and compassion for the victims and their families as the reason for settling.

Dyke sold Bushmaster in 2006 for $70 million to Cerberus Capital Management. The company became part of the Freedom Group (renamed Remington Outdoor Company in 2015), owned by Cerberus Capital Management, in April 2006. In December 2010, the Freedom Group announced that operations at the Windham facility would cease as of March 2011. Windham Weaponry was founded by Dyke in 2011 in Windham, "to put Maine people back to work who lost their jobs" when Bushmaster moved out of state in March 2011. Windham Weaponry was in operation until September 2023 when it ceased operations after Dyke died on March 1, 2023, at aged 89.

In December 2012, Cerberus Capital Management announced its intention to sell Bushmaster's successor company, Freedom Group. In a press release, Cerberus stated that they would "retain a financial advisor to design and execute a process to sell [their] interests in Freedom Group" (Freedom merged with the former Bushmaster company). Cerberus indicated that the decision to sell the company stemmed from publicity surrounding the use of a Bushmaster rifle in the Sandy Hook Elementary School shooting. According to the company: "It is apparent that the Sandy Hook tragedy was a watershed event that has raised the national debate on gun control to an unprecedented level."

Cerberus announced in late 2013 that it had failed to divest itself of the Freedom Group and planned to buy out some Cerberus investors. Those who chose to give up their shares would be paid by an unidentified lender.

In January 2020, the parent entity, Remington Outdoor Company, announced that it would focus operations on its core hunting and shooting brands: AAC, Barnes, Remington, and Marlin. It also announced that it would no longer produce Bushmaster, TAPCO, DPMS, and StormLake Barrels.

In September 2020, in the bankruptcy auction of Remington Outdoor Company, Crotalus Holdings, Inc. purchased the Bushmaster trademarks.

In August 2021, Bushmaster Firearms Industries, Inc. revived the brand name with a new business headquartered in Minden, Nevada. The new Bushmaster business revived XM15-E2S, 450 Bushmasters, ACR, and BA50 brands.

== Products ==
Bushmaster First Generation rifle

Bushmaster's firearms, such as the XM-15 line, were offered in a 5.56 NATO chambering with forged aircraft-grade (7075-T6) aluminum receivers. Most Bushmaster barrels were 4150 steel, offered in 1:9 twist rate, and chrome-lined to increase durability. Some barrels were available with 1:7 rifling on special order. Stainless steel or chrome molybdenum barrels were available on certain models.

Bushmaster Firearms originally produced their 'First Generation' rifle using an aluminum lower receiver and a stamped steel upper receiver. This first-generation model used a long-stroke gas piston operating system. The recoil spring was within the upper barrel gas system compared to the AR-15/M-16, where the recoil spring is within the butt stock. Originally marketed for LE/Military contractors, Bushmaster later moved from this design to a variant of Eugene Stoner's AR-15/M-16 weapon system. Bushmaster chambered the First Generation rifles for the 5.56mm round. The First Generation rifles are considered scarce and collectible.

In late January 2008, Bushmaster signed a licensing deal with Magpul, granting Bushmaster the right to produce and distribute Magpul's Masada rifle, renamed the Bushmaster ACR. According to the company, in 2010, Bushmaster began making the ACR available to the civilian market, posting it on its website.

Carbon 15 was a lightweight AR15 available as rifles or pistols. It saved weight by using polymer in the upper and lower receivers. Some models also removed the forward assist and the dust cover and used a thinner barrel design to save weight.

The Bushmaster Dissipator combined a longer sight radius with a shorter barrel to allow more effective use of the iron sights. Similar modifications sometimes suffered from reliability problems due to the proximity of the gas port to the muzzle, which threw the timing of the weapon's gas system off and made it more sensitive to gas port diameter and port pressure variables introduced by the ammunition. Bushmaster's solution was to use a low-profile gas block in the normal position for carbine-length barrels and fit the front sight tower/gas block, which was not connected to the gas system, further forward to create a longer sight radius.

=== Discontinued ===
Bushmaster produced the Bushmaster Arm Pistol from 1977 to 1990. The Bushmaster M17S was a semi-automatic bullpup rifle that was manufactured by Bushmaster from 1992 until 2005. The BAR-10 was meant to compete in the .308 market against ArmaLite's AR-10 series rifles and Springfield Armory's M1A Rifle by offering a .308 rifle that could accept the relatively inexpensive metric and inch pattern FN FAL magazines. In 2005 Bushmaster discontinued the BAR-10 line of rifles.

== Gallery ==
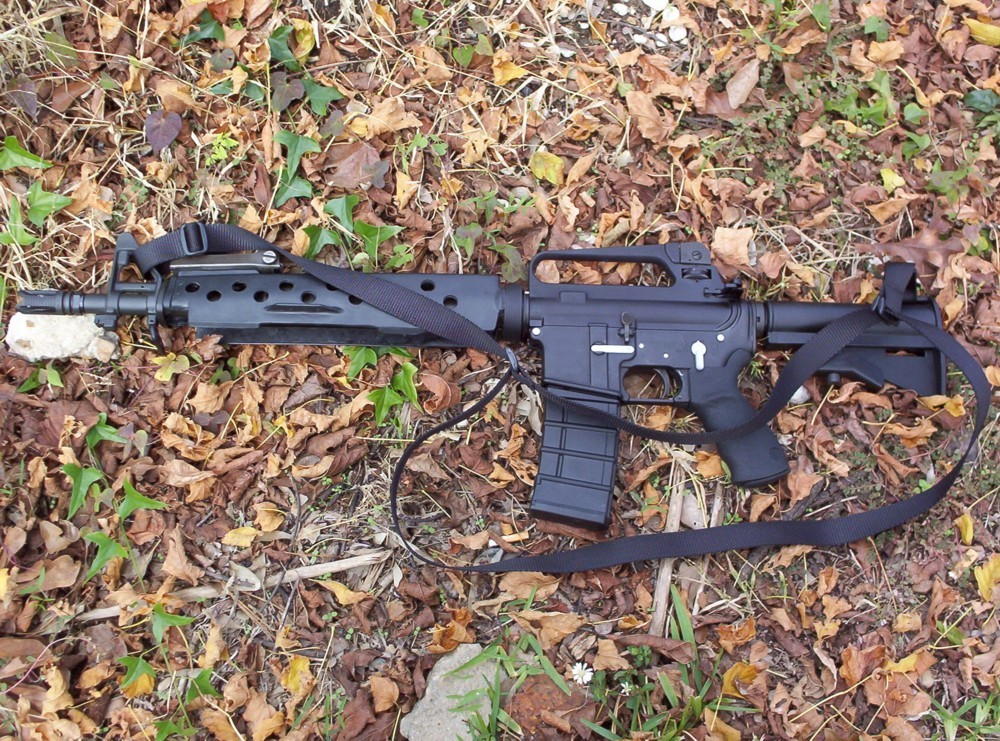
Bushmaster XM15 E2S A2 16in Dissipator Model

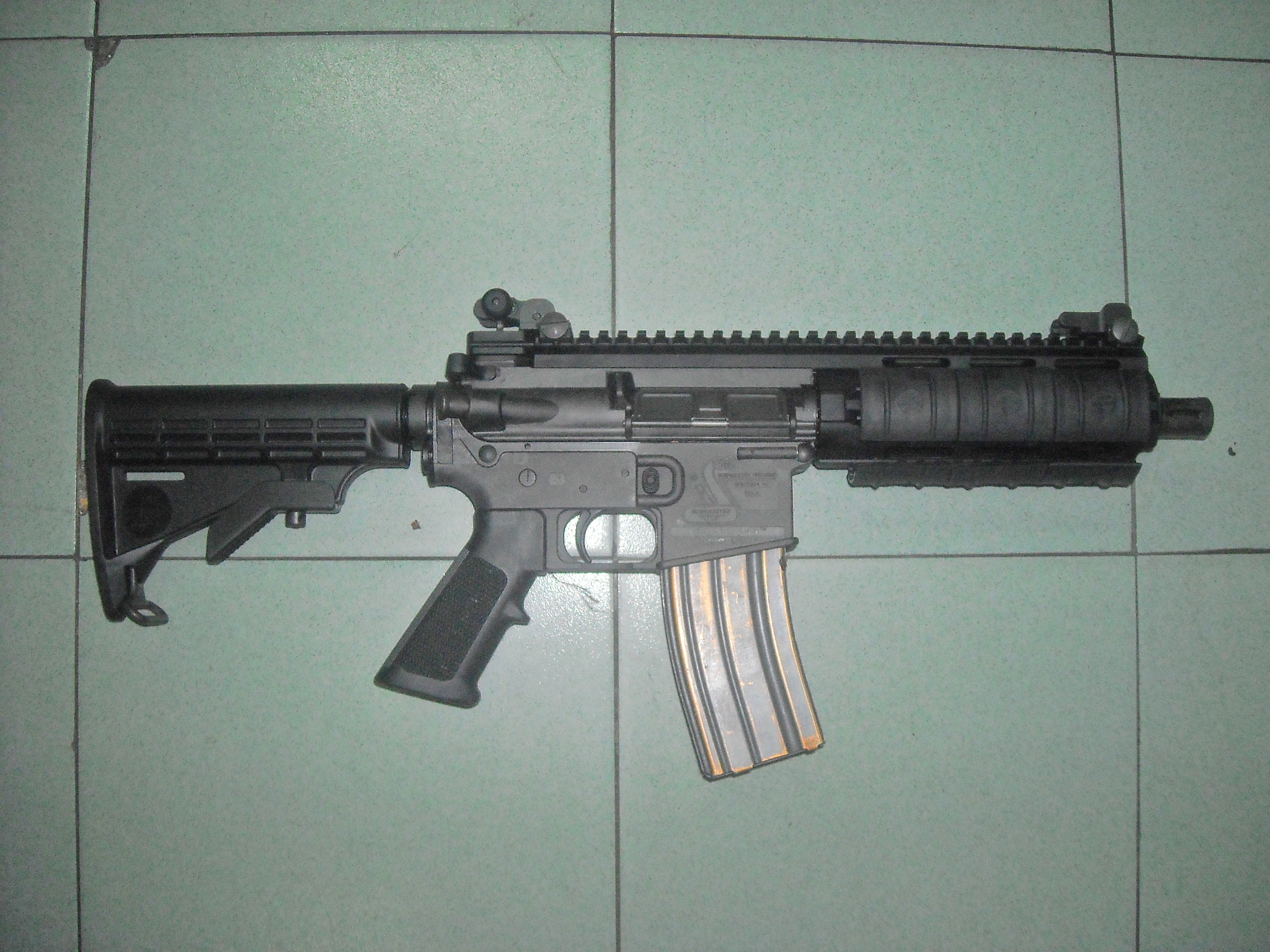
Bushmaster Carbon-15 SBR (short barreled rifle)

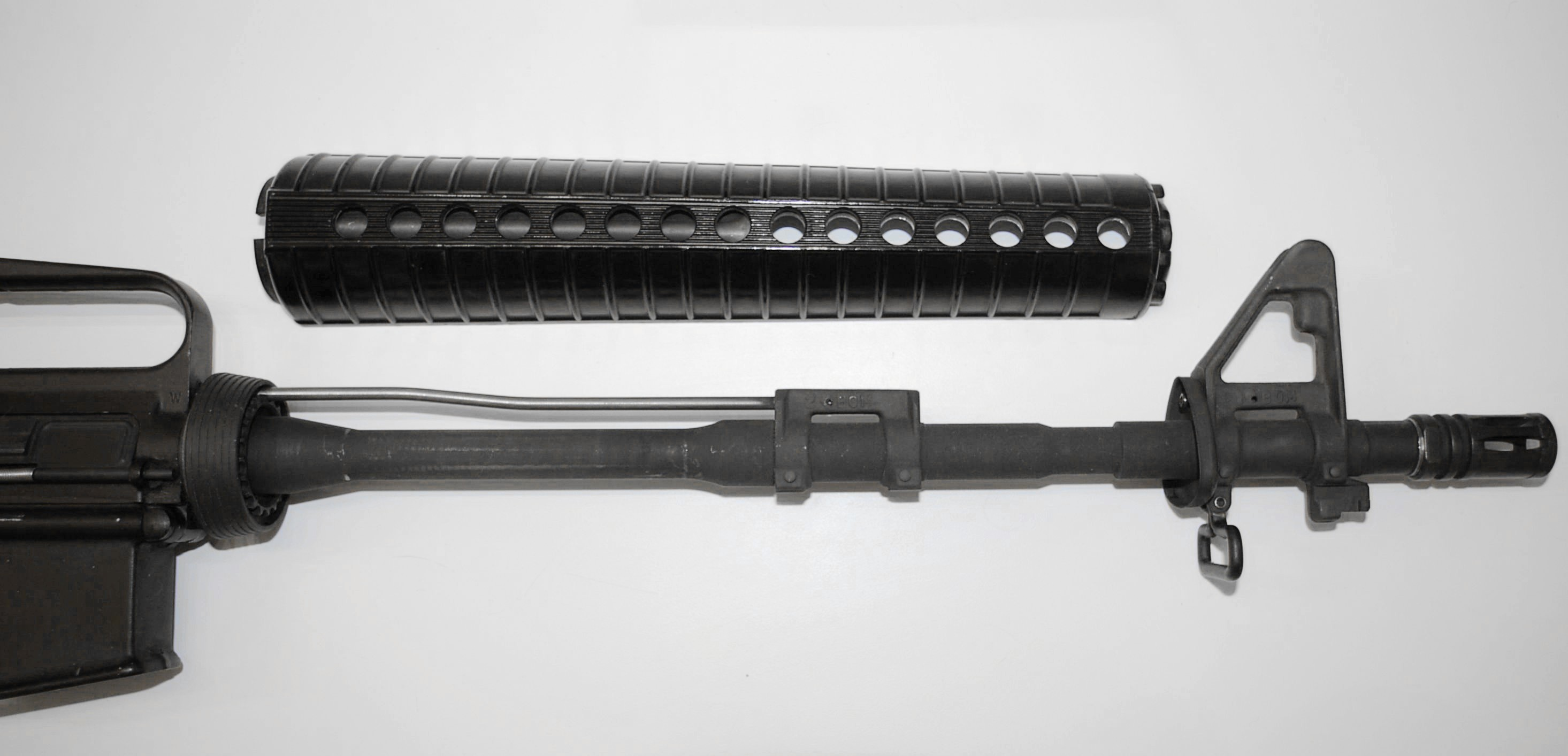
Bushmaster Dissipator barrel with M16A2 handguard

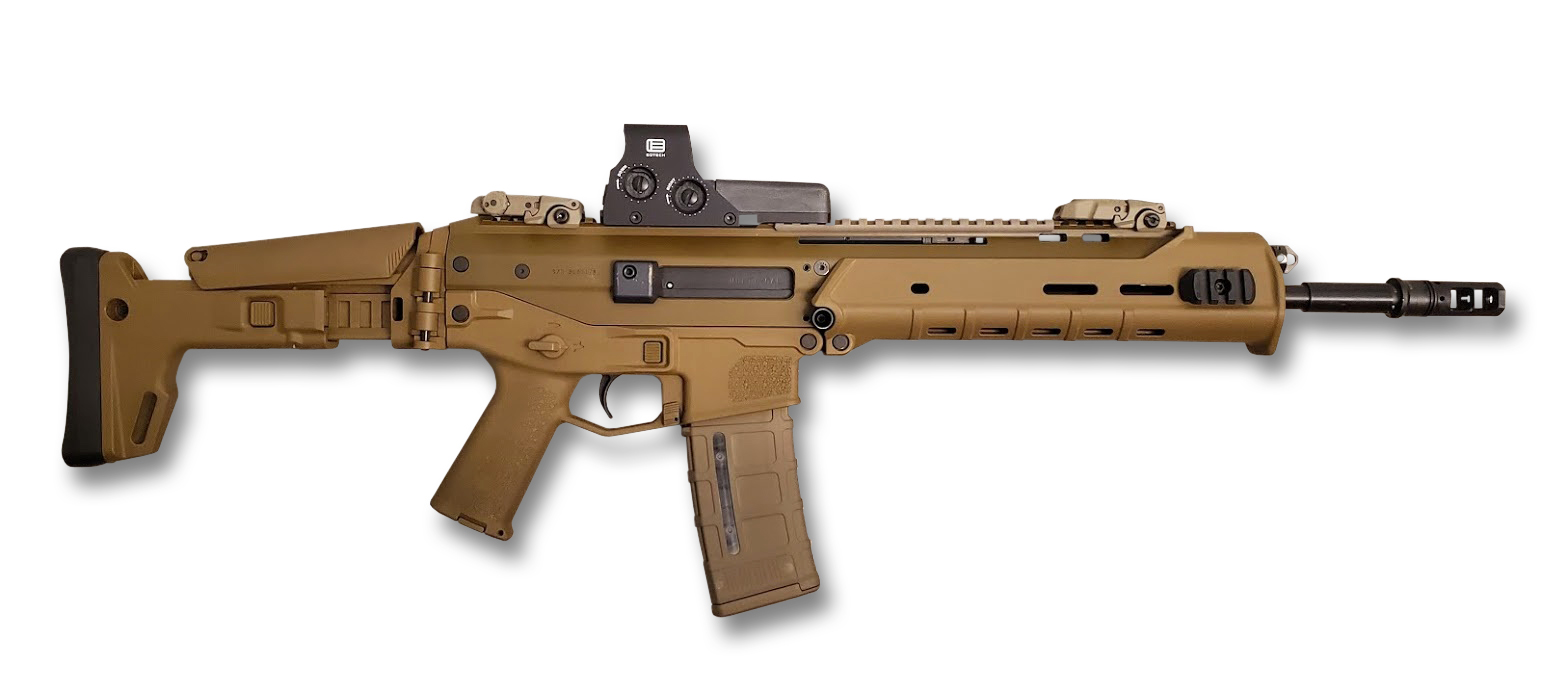
Bushmaster ACR

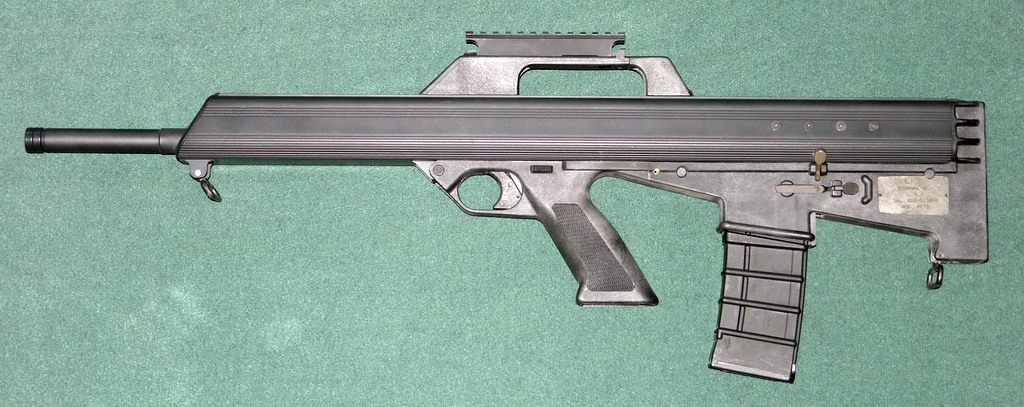
Bushmaster M17S

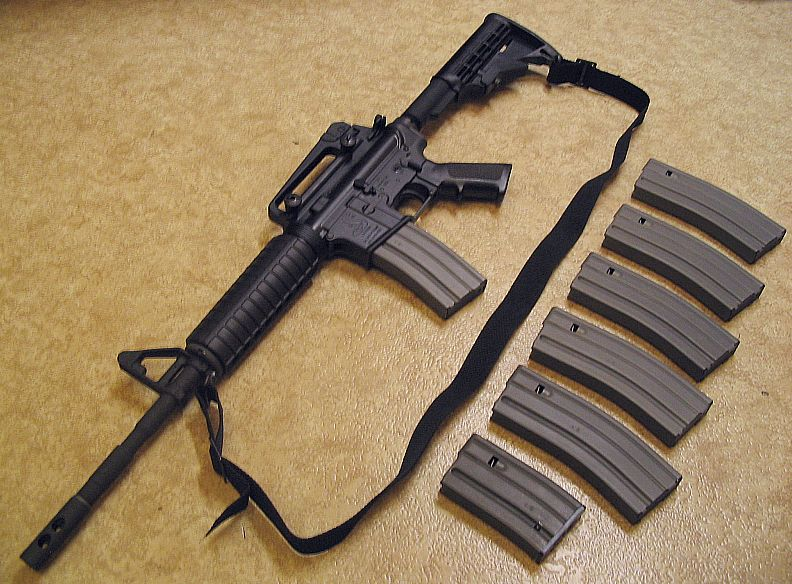
Bushmaster XM15-E2S M4 Style Carbine

== See also ==
- Bushmaster M4 Type Carbine
