= Remington Arms =

Former American weapon and ammunition manufacturer

Remington Arms Company, LLC
- Type: Subsidiary
- Industry: Arms industry
- Founded: 1816; 210 years ago in Ilion, New York
- Founder: Eliphalet Remington
- Defunct: 2020; 6 years ago
- Fate: All assets were sold
- Successor: Remington Firearms; Remington Ammunition
- Headquarters: Madison, North Carolina, United States
- Area served: Worldwide
- Key people: Anthony Acitelli (CEO)
- Products: Firearms, ammunition, and accessories
- Revenue: US$950 million (2004)
- Parent: Remington Outdoor Company (2007–2020)
- Divisions: Remington Ammunition
- Website: www.remington.com (ammunition) www.remarms.com (firearms)

Remington Arms Company, LLC, was an American manufacturer of firearms and ammunition. It was formerly owned by the Remington Outdoor Company, which went bankrupt in 2020 with its lines of business sold to several purchasers. Two resulting companies each bear the Remington name—the firearms manufacturer is Remington Firearms owned by RemArms, LLC., and the ammunition business is Remington Ammunition owned by Czechoslovak Group.

Founded in 1816 by Eliphalet Remington as E. Remington and Sons in Ilion, New York, it was one of the oldest gun makers in the United States and claimed to be the oldest factory in the country that still made its original product. The company was the largest rifle manufacturer in North America according to 2015 ATF statistics. The company developed or adopted more cartridges than any other gun maker or ammunition manufacturer in the world.

== History ==
=== 19th century origins ===
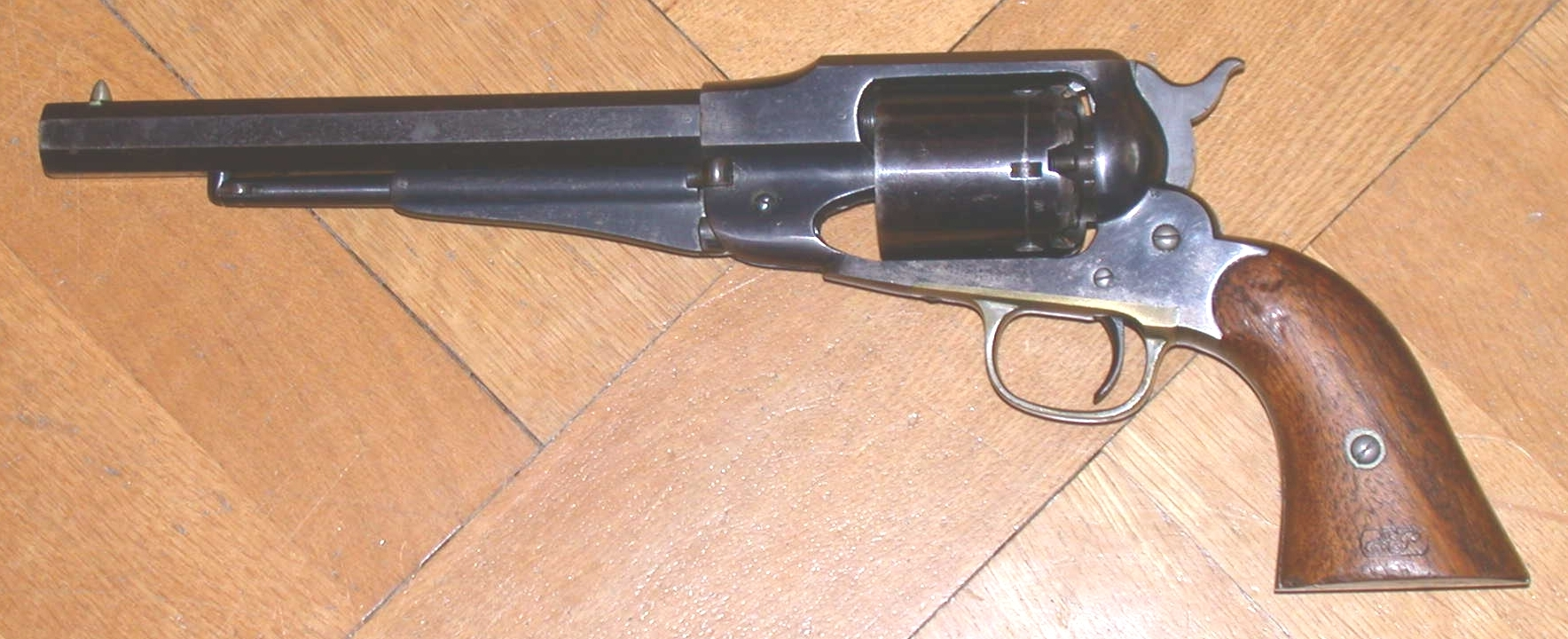
Remington New Model Army Revolver, made 1863–1875

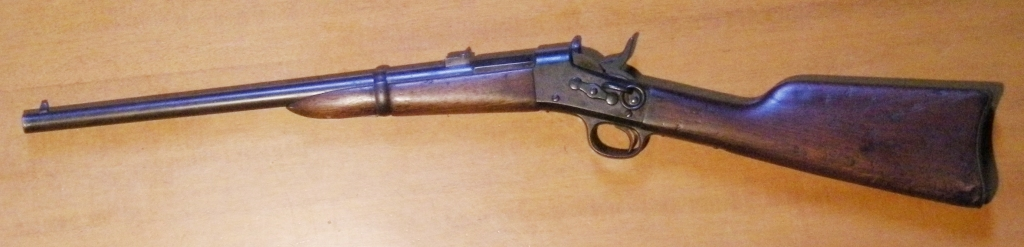
Remington Rolling Block Carbine 1867

The Remington company was founded in 1816. Eliphalet Remington II (1793–1861) believed he could build a better gun than he could buy. Remington began designing and building a flintlock rifle for himself. At age 23 (in late 1816), he entered a shooting match; though he finished second, his well-made gun impressed other contestants. Before Remington left the field that day, he had received so many orders from other competitors that he had officially entered the gunsmithing business. By 1828, he moved his operation to nearby Ilion. The modern Remington firearms plant still uses this site.

On March 7, 1888, two years after spinning off the typewriter business which later became Remington Rand, the Remington family sold the ownership of E. Remington & Sons to new owners, Marcellus Hartley and Partners. This consisted of Hartley and Graham of New York, New York, a major sporting goods chain that also owned the Union Metallic Cartridge Company in Bridgeport and the Winchester Repeating Arms Company of New Haven, both in Connecticut. At this time, the company formally changed its name to the Remington Arms Company.

=== 20th century ===
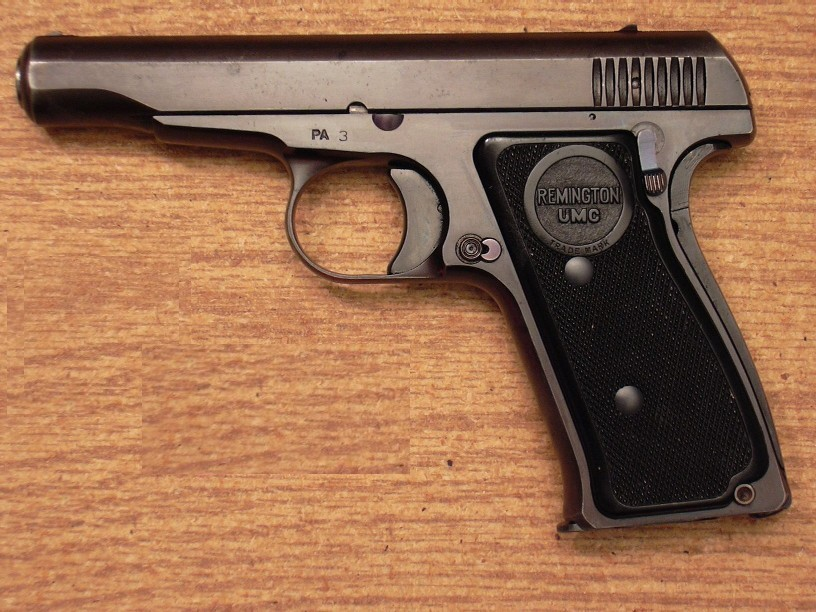
Remington-Pedersen 51

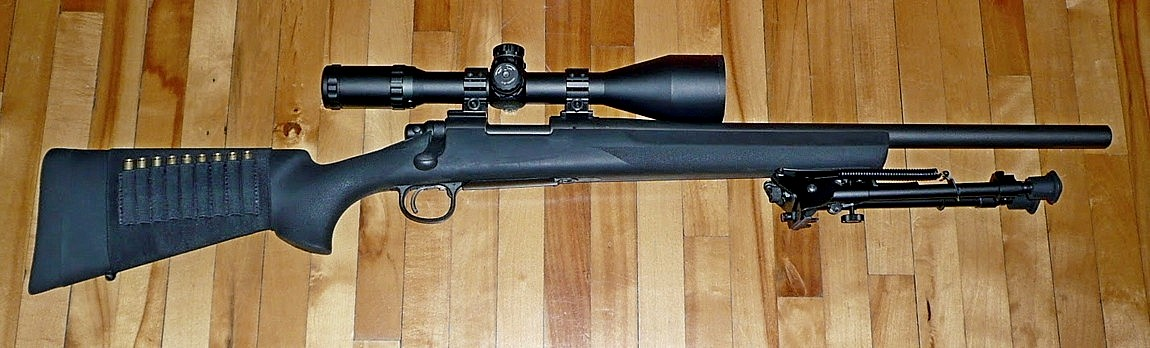
Remington 700 SPS Tactical .223 Rem 20 inch heavy barrel

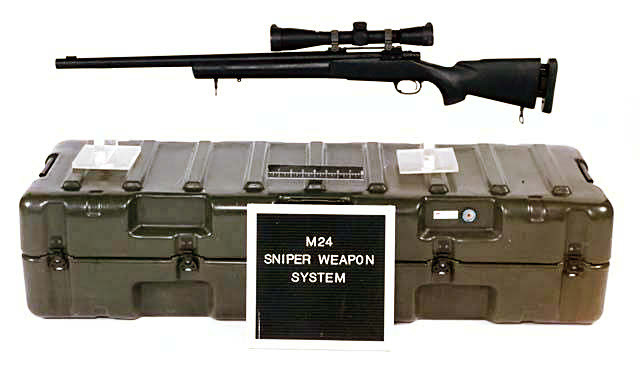
The M24 SWS military sniper rifle, based on the Remington 700.

After the 1902 death of Marcellus Hartley, Marcellus Hartley Dodge Sr. assumed leadership of the company. Hartley's death came with particularly unfortunate timing for the company. Inventor John M. Browning, who had just severed his partnership with Winchester after a meeting at Winchester's factory in New Haven, Connecticut, had scheduled a meeting with Hartley at Remington headquarters in hopes of partnering with Remington to produce his newest patented design, the Browning Auto-5. This would have resulted in Remington being the sole global manufacturer of the Auto-5. However, upon arriving for their meeting, Browning was informed that Hartley had just died. This turn of events resulted in Fabrique Nationale de Herstal ultimately becoming the original manufacturer of the Auto-5, and Remington only later receiving a licensing agreement to produce a variant for the U.S. market dubbed the "Remington Model 11".

In 1910, the company merged into a single company with Union Metallic Cartridge, becoming known as "Remington-UMC".

After the US entered World War I, Remington became deeply involved in the war effort. Remington was left with huge stocks of guns and ammunition and no prospects for payment. The US government purchased the firearms.

During the Great Depression, Remington was purchased by DuPont in 1934. Remington was reorganized by DuPont as "Remington Arms Co., Inc". DuPont was a company that had made its name with improvements to gunpowder. A year after becoming a subsidiary of DuPont, Remington purchased the Peters Cartridge Company. Today, many of the Remington headstamps still have "R-P" on them, standing for "Remington-Peters".

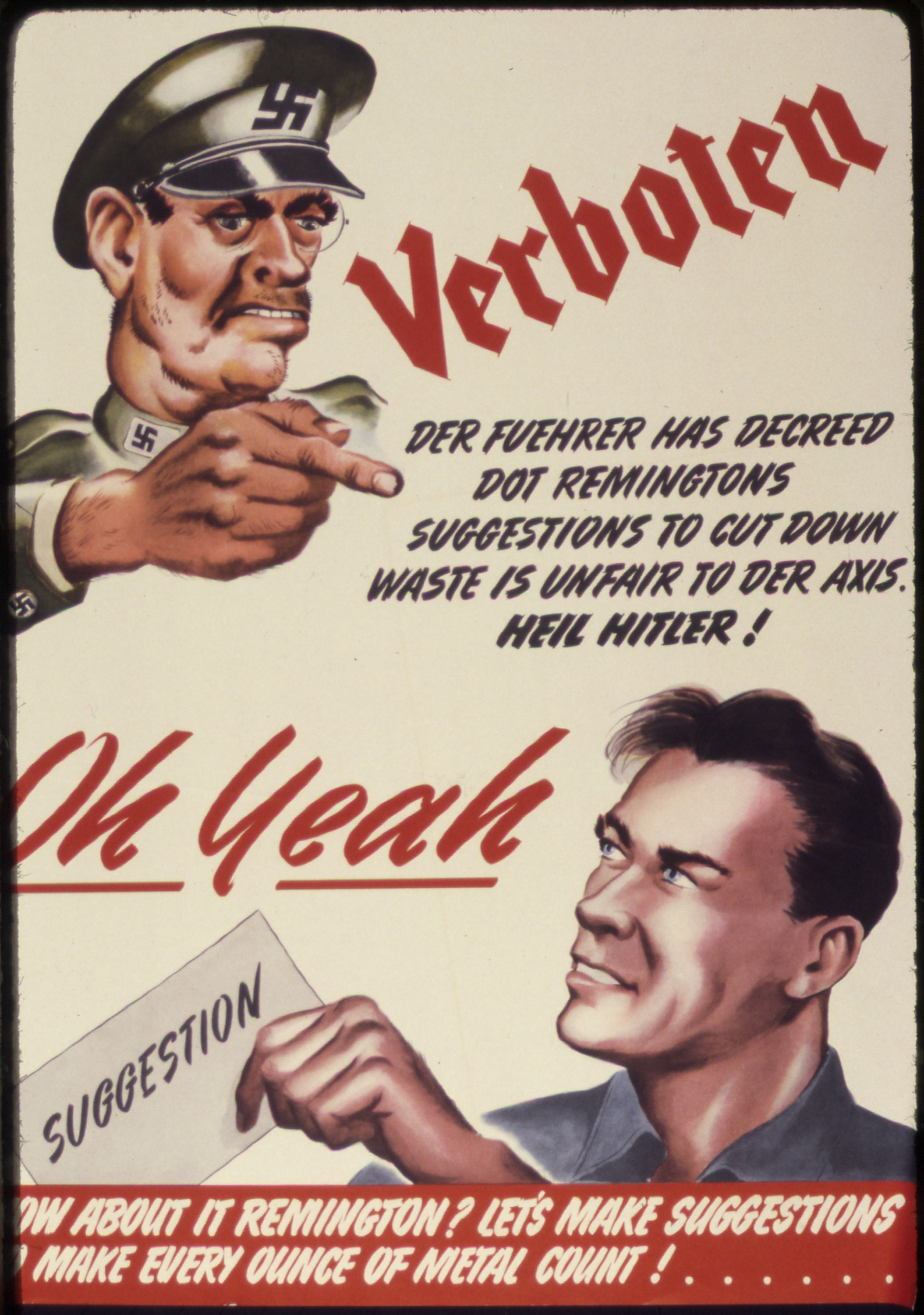
WW2-era propaganda poster urging Remington employees to submit suggestions for waste minimization.

In 1940, the US Army became worried about its ammunition capacity and asked Remington to collaborate on a plan for national expansion. With the aid of DuPont, Remington built the Lake City Army Ammunition Plant (named Lake City Arsenal initially) and Denver Ordnance ammunition plants, and three more plants later on, including the Lowell Ordnance Plant. Though the plants belonged to the US government, Remington was asked to oversee their operation. Among the weapons that Remington manufactured for the government during World War II was the famous M1903A3 Springfield bolt-action rifle.

During the 1950s and 1960s, Remington expanded into other products besides guns, with the purchase of Mall Tool Company in 1956. One of the products was chain saws.

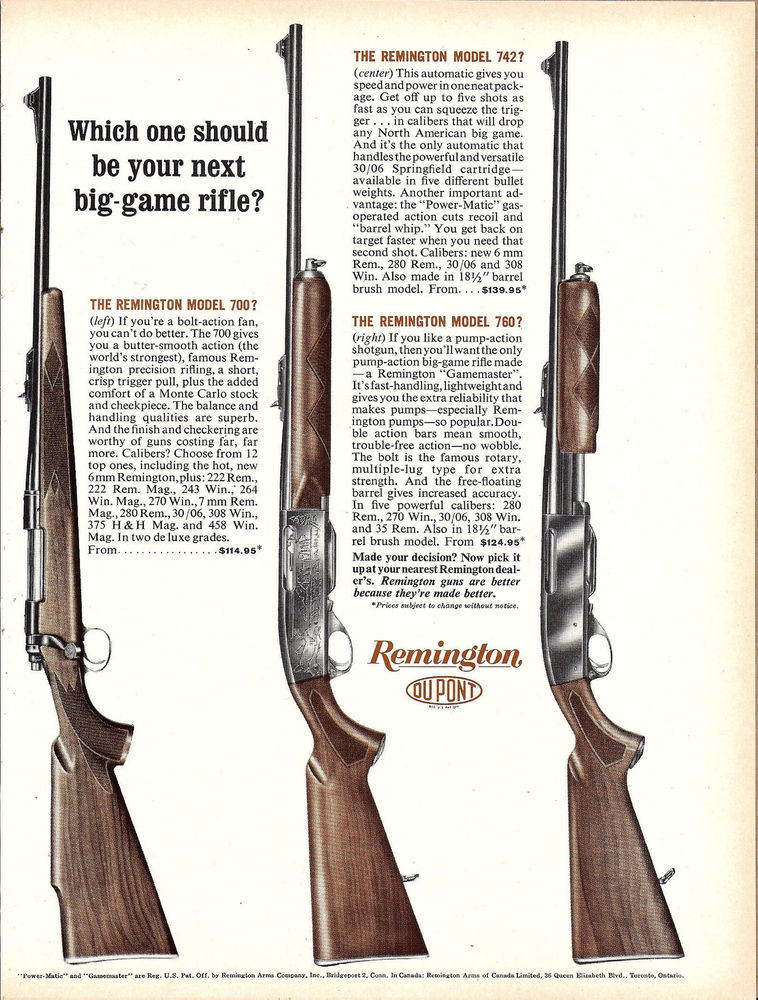
1963 DuPont ad for the Remington Model 700 Remington Model 742 and Remington Model 760

In 1962, Remington introduced the Model 700 bolt-action rifle, which became one of Remington's most successful firearms and quickly lent itself to developments of many sub-variants, including the Remington 700 BDL, Remington 700PSS for police and law enforcement agencies (the rifle, later renamed 700P, is very popular among law enforcement agencies) and the military M24 SWS, which was the United States Army standard sniper rifle between 1988 and 2010. Other armed forces worldwide still use it, such as the IDF. Other firearms brands designed and manufactured sniper rifles based on the reliable and accurate Remington Model 700 action.

In 1969, Remington broke ground on a new ammunition manufacturing plant in Lonoke, Arkansas. By 1970, centerfire ammunition in the Remington, UMC and Peter's brand names were being produced by the facility. The company's shotshell then rimfire ammunition production operations were subsequently moved to the Lonoke facility in the mid 1970s and early 1980s.

In 1986, Remington closed its ammunition plant in Bridgeport, Connecticut, completely transferring operations to the facility in Lonoke, Arkansas. A year later, Remington built a new clay targets plant in Athens, Georgia. According to an article in The New York Times, in 1993, Remington's parent company—DuPont de Nemours & Company (DuPont)—sold Remington to the New York investment firm Clayton, Dubilier & Rice (CD&R) for $300 million. The Times, citing the National Sporting Goods Manufacturers Association said that "rifle and shotgun sales totaled $900 million" in 1992. Citing the National Shooting Sports Foundation president, the article said that since 1986, "interest in hunting" had "declined". The sale of long guns—which represented 75% of Remington sales had become "slack" by 1993, while the sale of handguns had become the "fastest-growing segment" of the gun industry.

=== 21st century ===
In June 2007, a private equity firm, Cerberus Capital Management, acquired Remington Arms for $370 million, including $252 million in assumed debt. It became part of Cerberus' Freedom Group. Remington was millions of dollars in debt and did not report a profit from 2003 to 2005. In 2015, the Freedom Group was renamed Remington Outdoor Company.

In December 2007, Remington Arms acquired rifle-maker Marlin Firearms. In 2009, ammunition sales continued to remain high despite the ongoing United States Ammunition Shortage during that time. Chief Executive Officer Ted Torbeck said that consumer concerns over future restrictions, and taxes on ammunition and firearms by the Obama administration, were creating a rise in demand.

In 2009, Remington's former ammunition factory in Bridgeport, Connecticut, was investigated by the Travel Channel's Ghost Adventures. The site was eventually purchased by Peter DiNardo Enterprises Inc. and was scheduled for demolition.

In October 2009, Remington Military products acquired suppressor manufacturer Advanced Armament Corporation. In 2010, Remington introduced the fastest commercially available shotgun shell, Hypersonic Steel, with a patented wad technology that allows the shot to travel at 1,700 ft/s (520 m/s).

After a 12-year absence from the handgun market, Remington announced the Remington 1911 R1 in 2010. It had previously ceased production of its last handgun, the Model XP-100R in 1998. Later in 2010, Remington introduced the Versa Max auto-loading shotgun. Its patented "Versa Port" system self-regulates gas pressure based on the length of the cartridge used, enabling the shotgun to shoot light 2 3/4 in (70 mm) target loads, 3 in (76 mm) hunting loads, and 3 1/2 in (89 mm) magnum hunting loads.

In 2012, Remington won a US Army contract to manufacture 24,000 M4A1 carbines at $673 per unit worth $16,163,252 total.

In 2013, for the first time since 1928, Remington began to offer an air rifle, called the "Remington Express."

On February 17, 2014, Remington announced a plan to build a new state-of-the-art plant in Huntsville, Alabama. Remington said it decided to move two production lines from the Ilion, New York, plant as a result of the fallout from the NY SAFE Act, which restricted gun ownership in response to the Sandy Hook Elementary School shooting. AR-15 style semi-automatic rifles from Bushmaster, DPMS, and Remington (R-15) and 1911 style R-1 pistols were produced in the plant. The plant was touted by Alabama's Department of Commerce Secretary and by Remington as a boon to Alabama's economy. The president of United Mine Workers Local 717, which represented workers at Ilion, expressed fears about the future of the New York facility and blamed the NY SAFE Act for the company's decision to favor Alabama over New York. Subsequently, about 100 Remington jobs were shifted from New York to Alabama.

Beginning in late 2017, Remington began bankruptcy planning, having suffered declining sales and reputation; damage from an August 2017 exposé on the CBS news program 60 Minutes about X-Mark Pro trigger defects linked to several deaths, and amassed some $950 million worth of debt. The low sales and debt were blamed on either a reduction in "panic-buying", or diminishing quality and reputation. Remington filed for bankruptcy in March 2018, and exited bankruptcy on May 17, 2018, less than two months later. The company's quick exit was due to a pre-approved restructuring plan supported by 97% of its creditors, which canceled all shares of common stock issued before the bankruptcy proceedings, and the issuance of new shares to convert over $775 million of company debt into equity.

The families of nine victims and a teacher who were shot and survived the 2012 Sandy Hook Elementary School shooting with a Remington Bushmaster rifle filed a wrongful death lawsuit in Connecticut state court seeking a jury trial to recover unspecified damages. The case was briefly moved to federal court before being referred back to the state court level. In 2016, the suit was initially dismissed by a Connecticut Superior Court citing the immunity provided to firearms manufacturers by the federal Protection of Lawful Commerce in Arms Act (PLCAA) of 2005. Remington's bankruptcy delayed the suit. On March 14, 2019, the Connecticut Supreme Court ruled, 4–3, that the suit's wrongful marketing claim could proceed to trial under Connecticut's Unfair Trade Practices Act (CUTPA) which addressed marketing including "truly unethical and irresponsible marketing practices promoting criminal conduct" and was not preempted by the PLCAA. The US Supreme Court declined to hear the case. On February 15, 2022, it was announced that a $73 million settlement had been reached between the Sandy Hook families and Remington. The cost of the settlement was borne by insurers.

The Remington arms factory in Ilion was closed in March 2024. In July 2025 the site was sold to Turin Hoefler Avenue LLC. In April 2026 it was reported that a 250,000 square foot AI data center was planned as the primary post-remediation use for the factory.

==== Breakup ====
On July 28, 2020, Remington filed again for Chapter 11 bankruptcy protection, and its assets were divided up and sold to various buyers, including:

- The Remington brand name and the Lonoke ammunition factory was bought by Vista Outdoor, which used it to market and manufacture several types of ammunition.
- The Remington firearms business (excluding Marlin Firearms) was sold to Roundhill Group, LLC, which now operates it through the holding company RemArms, LLC. RemArms licenses the use of the "Remington" brand name from Vista Outdoor.
- Marlin Firearms was purchased by Sturm, Ruger & Co.
