= Pedersen (disambiguation) =

Pedersen is a surname. It may also refer to:

- Pedersen rifle, a semi-automatic rifle designed by John Pedersen
- .276 Pedersen, an experimental cartridge used in the Pedersen rifle
- Pedersen bicycle, designed by Mikael Pedersen
- Pedersen v. Office of Personnel Management, an American federal lawsuit
- 3312 Pedersen, an asteroid

== See also ==
- Pedersen commitment, a cryptographic technique
- Pedersen device, an attachment developed during World War I for the M1903 Springfield rifle
- Pedersen index, measure of electoral volatility in party systems
- Pedersen's law, a linguistic law
