= Remington Model 14 =

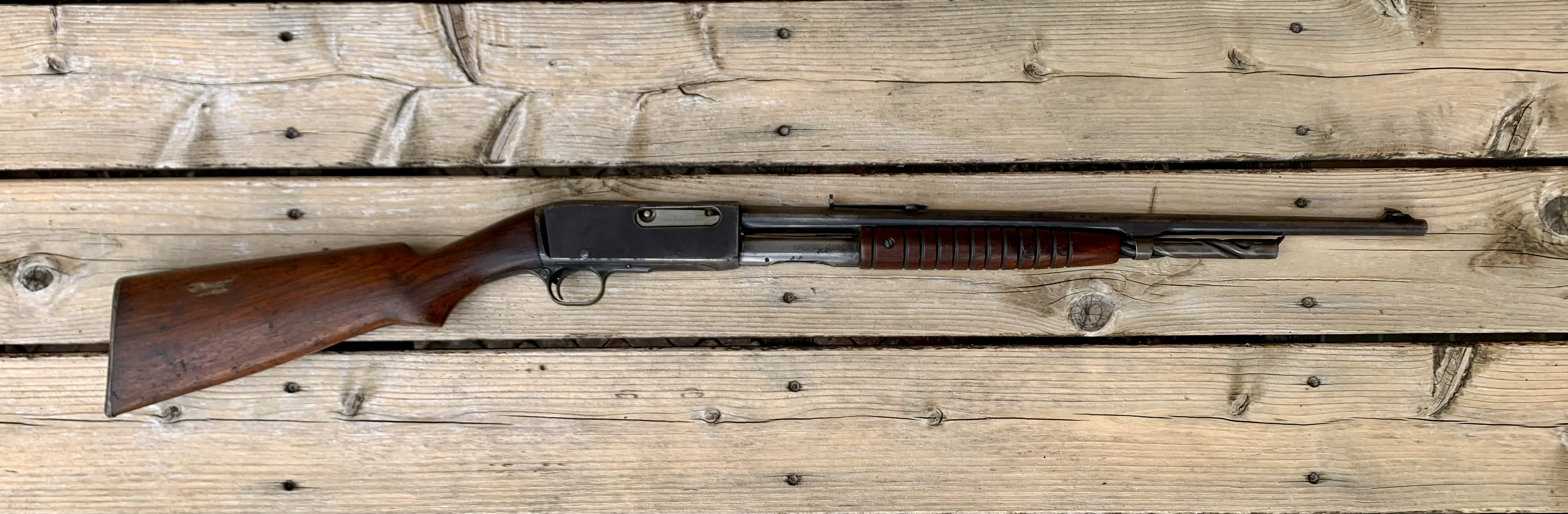
- A Remington Model 14 Gamemaster
- Type: Slide-action rifle
- Place of origin: United States

Production history
- Designer: John Pedersen
- Designed: 1908
- Manufacturer: Remington Arms
- Produced: 1913–1934 (Model 14); 1914–1931 (Model 14-1/2); 1935–1950 (Model 141)
- Variants: see variants

Specifications (Model 141)
- Mass: 7.75 lb (3.52 kg)
- Length: 42.75 in (108.6 cm)
- Barrel length: 24 in (61 cm)
- Caliber: Model 14 & 141: .25 Remington; .30 Remington; .32 Remington; .35 Remington; Model 14-1/2: .38-40 Winchester; .44-40 Winchester
- Sights: Bead front, open rear

The Remington Model 14 is a pump-action repeating rifle designed for the Remington Arms company by John Pedersen. It is part of a series of rifles that include the Remington Model 14-1/2 and the Remington Model 141.

== History ==
John Pedersen worked for Remington Arms and for the United States Government. Well known for the military Pedersen device, he designed numerous sporting arms, as well as Remington's only house-brand semiautomatic pistol, the Model 51. In 1908, Pedersen was assigned the task of designing a rifle that would compete with the Winchester Model 1894 lever action.

== Design ==
A pump-action centerfire rifle was a peculiar choice to compete with a lever action. Most hunters preferred the simple lever-operated repeating rifles produced by Winchester, Marlin, and Savage. Remington tried to take the high ground by introducing the John Browning designed semi-automatic Model 8 in 1906, along with a new line of cartridges for it. The Model 8 didn't sell overly well and Remington felt that a manually operated gun would sell better. Since Winchester had a near lock on the lever-action market, Remington chose a sleek-packaged pump action along with the same four calibers introduced with the Model 8 rifle.

The Model 14's design incorporated several innovative concepts. Among them was a spiral magazine tube to prevent bullet tips from contacting the primer of the cartridge in front of them. This magazine moved with the fore-end when pumping the action. Loading was through an opening in the magazine itself located between the fore-end and the receiver. The bolt unlocked via a button pressed through the ejection port though firing the gun automatically unlocked the bolt. The Model 14 was a takedown rifle that featured a single knurled screw on the left side of the receiver that was withdrawn allowing the trigger group and buttstock to be removed from the bottom of the gun.

Original prototypes were chambered for the .30-30 cartridge, but the gun was only offered for sale in the above-mentioned calibers. The 30 Remington was basically a rimless version of the .30-30 and load data from that cartridge is interchangeable.

U.S. patent 963,171 describes the basic operating mechanism of the Model 14 which was later used on the Model 14-1/2 and Model 141.
