= Remington Model 30 =

- Type: Bolt-action rifle
- Place of origin: United States

Production history
- Designer: C.C. Loomis, C.H. Barnes
- Manufacturer: Remington Arms
- Produced: 1921–1925 (Model 30); 1926–1940 (Model 30 Express)
- No. built: 3,000 (Model 30); 22,800 (Model 30 Express); 2,427 (Model 720)
- Variants: Model 30; Model 30 Express; Model 720

Specifications
- Cartridge: .30-06 Springfield; .25 Remington; .30 Remington; .32 Remington; .35 Remington; 7mm Mauser; .257 Roberts; .270 Winchester (Model 720 only)
- Action: Bolt-action
- Feed system: 5-round internal box magazine
- Sights: Open w/ bead front, Lyman #48 receiver sight w/ bead front

The Remington Model 30 is a US sporting rifle of the inter-war period based on the military P14/M1917 Enfield rifle action, which was manufactured for the British and US governments during World War I. Initial specimens used surplus military parts with some modifications in order to consume the stock of parts, though further modifications were made as production progressed and later rifles were produced from newly manufactured parts. Most early rifles were in the military .30-06 calibre used in the M1917 but it became available in a variety of chamberings. It was the first high-powered bolt-action sporting rifle produced by Remington. Some would beg to differ as Remington made the Remington Lee factory sporting rifle from 1899-1909, 1446 were built in a variety of calibers.

== Design ==
The action was a modified Mauser design with dual front locking lugs and a rear safety lug where the base of the bolt handle fitted into a recess in the receiver. The action was large, strong and robust, and therefore ideally suited to powerful sporting cartridges under development. The action used an internal box magazine and the Mauser-type claw extractor for controlled round feeding for excellent reliability. The barrel used on initial versions was of the same shape as the original military one, except it was polished and deep blued. The trigger mechanism was initially the same two-stage military type. Remington used the same steel and heat treatment as for the M1917 rifles, although improving the dimensional tolerances and the standard of finish. The actions were proof-tested to 70,000 psi (482.6 MPa) breech pressure.

== History ==
In 1918, after the end of World War I and termination of contracts for both the P14 and M1917, Remington was left with two factories (the main factory at Ilion and a subsidiary at Eddystone) tooled up to make the M1917, and was also left with a large inventory of stored spare parts. It was decided to make a sporting version of the P14-M1917 model rifles at the Ilion plant. In 1921, Remington introduced the Model 30 High Power sporting rifle in caliber 30-06 Springfield. Early models differed from the military rifles by deleting the prominent rear sight protection ears and machining the receiver bridge to the same diameter as the receiver ring, and straightening the floorplate. These changes made for a better-looking rifle but magazine capacity was reduced from 6 to 5 rounds. The barrel was of the military profile but shortened slightly to 24". The barreled action was placed into a sporter type stock of plain American black walnut with a schnabel fore-end and a steel buttplate grooved to prevent slipping. A simple receiver aperture sight was fitted to the receiver bridge by a dovetail. This sight was soon discontinued and replaced with one mounted further forward on the barrel band. The Enfield-type cock-on-closing feature, and the double-stage military-type trigger were retained. In 1926, the stock was refined with a higher and thicker comb. A crossbolt was added, and checkering of the pistol grip and fore-end became standard. There was a deluxe Model 30S made 1930–32 with a better designed and chequered stock, a Lyman 48 receiver type sight called Model 30 Express.

In 1932–33 some substantial changes were made. The action was changed to cock as the bolt handle was lifted, and the trigger was altered to a short, single-stage pull. The Enfield-type cock-on-closing feature used until that time had been carried over from the original P14 and M1917 rifles, and was originally intended to facilitate rapid fire as the action heated up. However, this was unnecessary on a sporting rifle and the Mauser M98 and M1903 Springfield type cock-on-opening bolt was preferred by American sportsmen, so the action was changed accordingly. Other changes for 1932 were that the designations changed for the Model 30A (ex-M30), the Model 30R (carbine) was added, and a floating barrel was introduced instead of the earlier bedding system where the barrel contacted the front end of the stock. By 1939 all receivers were drilled and tapped to accept a receiver sight. Production stopped in 1940 with the introduction of the Model 720.

== Model 720 ==
The Remington Model 720 was the final improvement of the original Enfield action by Remington, and was only produced for a few years. It was replaced in 1948 by the much-simplified Model 721 and 722 rifles, which were developed eventually into the widely used Model 700 rifles that are still in production today. It was chambered in .270 Winchester, .257 Roberts & .30-06 Springfield.

== Production ==
The Model 30 had a 24-inch barrel, and was available in .30-06 Springfield only (1921–1925)- S/N between 00001 and 30600. About 3000 units were manufactured. A carbine version with a 20-inch barrel was produced from 1924 to 1925, also available only in .30-06 Springfield. Both of these models were replaced in 1926 by the upgraded Model 30 Express version. The Model 30 Express version was available in several configurations - The basic 30A with its 22-inch barrel, was offered in calibers .30-06 Springfield, .25 Rem, .30 Rem, .32 Rem, .35 Rem, 7mm Mauser, .257 Roberts. On these guns, the aperture receiver sight was omitted and replaced with a more conventional rear sight mounted on the barrel. The rifles were also available in more expensive grades; The Deluxe or "Special" 30S which in 1930 became the Model 30SL, the 30SR with Redfield Optics sight, the 30SX, with a Lyman sight, and the 30SM with Marble-Goss aperture receiver sight. These "Special" models were available with 22 or 24 inches barrel, selected stock, One variation the Model 30R Carbine was introduced in 1927 with a 20 inches barrel, and was available in .25 Rem, .30 Rem, .32 Rem, .35 Rem and 30-06 caliber. The Express 30 family and its variant were manufactured in number of approximatively 22800 units, between 1926 and 1940. Serialization is from number 00001 to 30560.

The Federal Bureau of Investigation acquired some Model 30-S rifles chambered for .30-06 in response to the 1933 Kansas City Massacre.

- The Model 30 is now a prized collectible when found in very good condition. This is especially true in calibers other than .30-06, which will command a significant premium over the basic Model 30 rifles.

In 1934, Honduras procured a version of the rifle chambered for 7×57mm known as Model 1934.

== See also ==
- Remington Arms
