= Pedersen rifle =

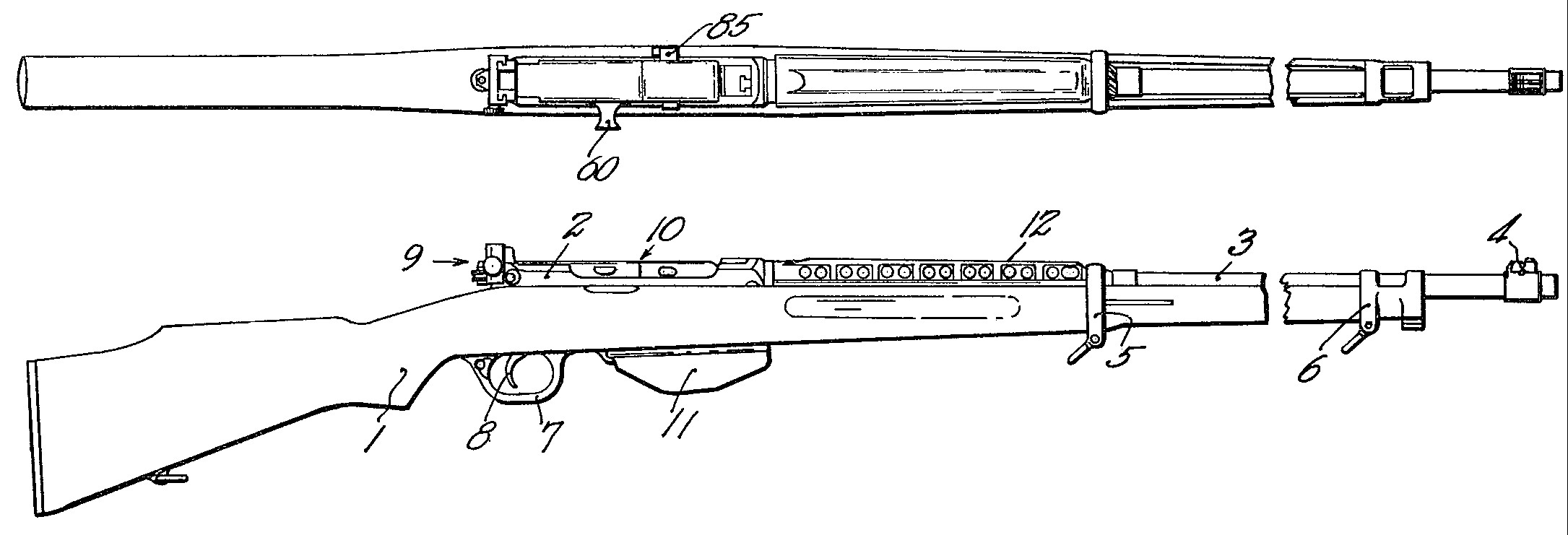
- Pedersen's toggle-delayed blowback rifle in caliber .276 Pedersen
- Type: Semi-automatic rifle
- Place of origin: United States

Service history
- Used by: United States Army (testing and field trials); Imperial Japan (prototype example encountered after Battle of Okinawa)

Production history
- Designer: John Pedersen
- Designed: 1920s
- No. built: Less Than 150 (conjecture)

Specifications
- Mass: 4.1 kg (9.0 lb)
- Length: 1,117 mm (44.0 in)
- Barrel length: 610 mm (24 in)
- Cartridge: .276 Pedersen
- Action: Toggle-delayed blowback
- Feed system: Fixed 10-round box magazine

The Pedersen Rifle, officially known in final form as the T1E3 rifle, was a United States semi-automatic rifle designed by John Pedersen that was made in small numbers for testing by the United States Army during the 1920s as part of a program to standardize and adopt a replacement for the M1903 Springfield.

Although the Pedersen was rated for a time as the most likely candidate for standardization and adoption, the .30 caliber M1 Garand was chosen instead.

== Background ==
The U.S. Army had shown interest in the idea of self-loading (semiautomatic) rifles before World War I. Combat experience during that war had made clear two general points: that the standard caliber .30-06 rifle cartridge was excessively powerful for the ranges (500 yards and less) where infantry combat was likely to take place, and that bolt-action rifles such as the M1903 Springfield were seriously lacking in firepower and second-shot hit capability. The U.S. Army Ordnance Bureau had no problem in soliciting designs and prototype weapons from inventors, and sought to facilitate their work by supplying barrels and other hardware that the inventors were likely not to be able to fabricate. However, such a traditional way of developing new weapons all too often saw potentially worthwhile designs wash out of the testing process due to a lack of engineering skills and experience both in the design and manufacturing phases.

Testing in the early 1920s led the Ordnance Bureau to identify three rifle designs - the Bang rifle, the Thompson Autorifle, and the primer-protrusion actuated Garand Model 1919 rifle - as promising candidates. However, all three designs were burdened with the high pressure and heat generating characteristics of the .30-06 ammunition, which looked likely to result in a weapon too heavy and too subject to overheating to be worthwhile. Trials with a small number of "militarized" .25 Remington autoloading rifles, despite their unsuitability for combat, provided a body of practical experience with semiautomatic rifles and an appreciation for the idea less powerful ammunition might be a critical part of the successful development of such weapons.

== Proposals ==
At this point in time, John Douglas Pedersen made an unsolicited proposal to the Army Ordnance Bureau which would have a profound impact on the entire effort to develop a serviceable semiautomatic rifle. In essence, he proposed to develop a rifle that would be neither recoil operated (which would involve excessive recoil and generate inaccuracy, due to the barrel moving within the rifle) nor gas operated (which would be complex, heavy, and potentially give undesirable operating characteristics). Additionally, he proposed to develop a new cartridge in the caliber .256 to .276 (6.5 mm to 7 mm) range that, while less powerful than the .30-06, would be effective out to 300 yards. Pedersen had gained a good reputation as both a firearms designer and production engineer at the Remington Arms Company. While at Remington, he designed four notable commercial firearms. Pedersen also designed the Pedersen Device during World War I. This was a sub-firearm intended to allow battlefield conversion of Springfield and M1917 Enfield rifles into semiautomatic rifles firing a pistol-sized cartridge.

The Bureau of Ordnance was sufficiently impressed that in 1923 it granted Mr. Pedersen a contract providing office space, a project budget, an annual salary, and in compensation for his departure from Remington the right to patent his work and collect royalties from the U.S. Government if his rifle was adopted.

== Development of the rifle and cartridge ==
Pedersen got to work in 1924, focusing first on the cartridge. The .276 Pedersen (7 x 51 mm) cartridge as finally standardized and manufactured at Frankford Arsenal was 1/2 in (13 mm) shorter than the .30-06, one quarter lighter, would generate nearly a third less heat and about half the recoil energy. Despite being smaller, it had a trajectory similar to the .30-06., with a muzzle velocity of 2,600 feet per second (792 m/s). The drawbacks of the design were diminished tracer performance, less effective armor piercing, plus anticipated logistical complications coming from the fact the .30-06 would remain in use for machine guns. The cartridge did, however, make a reasonably light yet effective semiautomatic rifle possible.

By early 1926, Pedersen had designed and built a prototype rifle. He had researched Army tactics and operational concepts, and had engineered the tooling for parts manufacture as an integral part of engineering the gun parts themselves. Such an application of sound research and development made a very strong impression on Army personnel when the rifle was presented for inspection and testing. The rifle was a solid, well-finished weapon, 44 inches (112 cm) long, weighing slightly over 8 pounds (3.6 kg). It utilized a disposable ten-round en bloc clip, a system favored at the time. Pedersen's rifle utilized a sophisticated up-breaking toggle-joint system like the Parabellum P.08 but improved by utilizing delayed blowback. This system was simple and free of both the fragility and severe kick of recoil operation, and the weight and complexity of gas operation (as in the Browning Automatic Rifle). To ease extraction, cartridge cases were coated in mineral wax. This left a thin film that was “hard, and durable, and was not sticky,”. The waxed cases solved the issue of difficult extraction, but hindered acceptance of the Pedersen rifle because officials feared that the wax would attract dirt and cause operating failures.

== Testing and evaluation ==
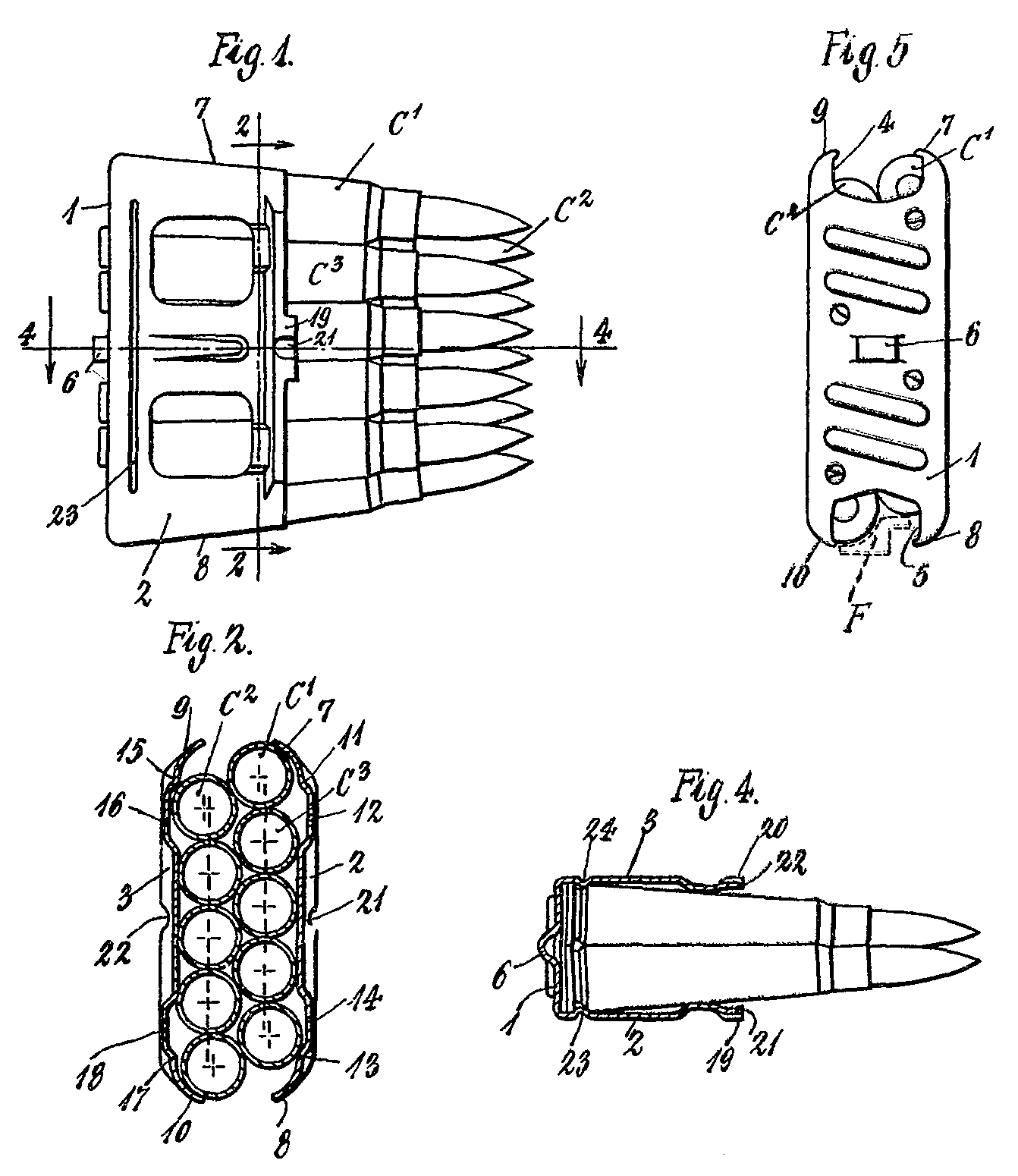
En-bloc clip loaded with 10 rounds of .276 Pedersen. Image from John Pedersen patent.

In February 1926, the new rifle and ammunition were tested in the presence of representatives of both the Army Chief of Infantry and the Chief of Cavalry. The results were “highly favorable” Production was authorized on May 20, 1926 of 20 rifles and 5 carbines. Following tests of reworked versions of the Thompson and primer-actuated Garand rifles, the Infantry Board in June, 1926 recommended further testing of all three rifles, but clearly indicated in its report the Pedersen rifle was the most developed of the three.

In April 1928 came the Infantry Board test report on the T1E3, and it was a solid endorsement of the rifle. The Board called for adoption of the T1E3 rifle to replace both the Model 1903 Springfield and the Browning Automatic Rifle. The Cavalry Board was also positive in its own evaluation of the T1E3. To soldiers used to the heavy recoil and exhausting manual operation of the Springfield rifle, the moderate recoil and self-loading functionality of the T1 rifle clearly must have made an impression. Due to problems with primer-actuation, John Garand gave up work on a .30-06 semiautomatic rifle and also focused exclusively on caliber .276.

Doubts about the lethal effect of the .276 round were strong enough to result in extensive tests in June and July 1928 by the “Pig Board” (so called because lethality tests were carried out on anaesthetized pigs). The Board found all three rounds (.256, .276, and .30) were wounding out to 1,200 yards (1100m). At 300 yards, the smaller .256 caliber round delivered "by far the most severe wounds in all parts of the animal." At 600 yards the results were similar for all three rounds. No compelling case could be made against the Pedersen round.

== Further tests and a final decision ==
In July 1928, the War Department created the Army, Navy, and Marine Corps Semiautomatic Rifle Board to further test and evaluate both existing and newly submitted rifles with an eye toward focusing on standardizing the most serviceable design. Unlike previous boards, this one would continue to function for three years, and would end up undertaking three series of tests. This Board displayed a strong interest in the development of a .30-06 semiautomatic rifle, but at the same time recognized the potential effectiveness of the .276 round at ranges up to 600 yards and that relatively light weight rifles that could be built around it; the Board remained consistent with the de facto Army policy of favoring adoption of the .276 round. Counting the Pedersen T1E3 rifle (by this time covered by U.S. patent 1,737,974), seven rifles were submitted for consideration. One of these rifles was John Garand's gas-operated .276 rifle, the T3, which had a 10-round magazine loaded with a symmetrical en bloc clip.

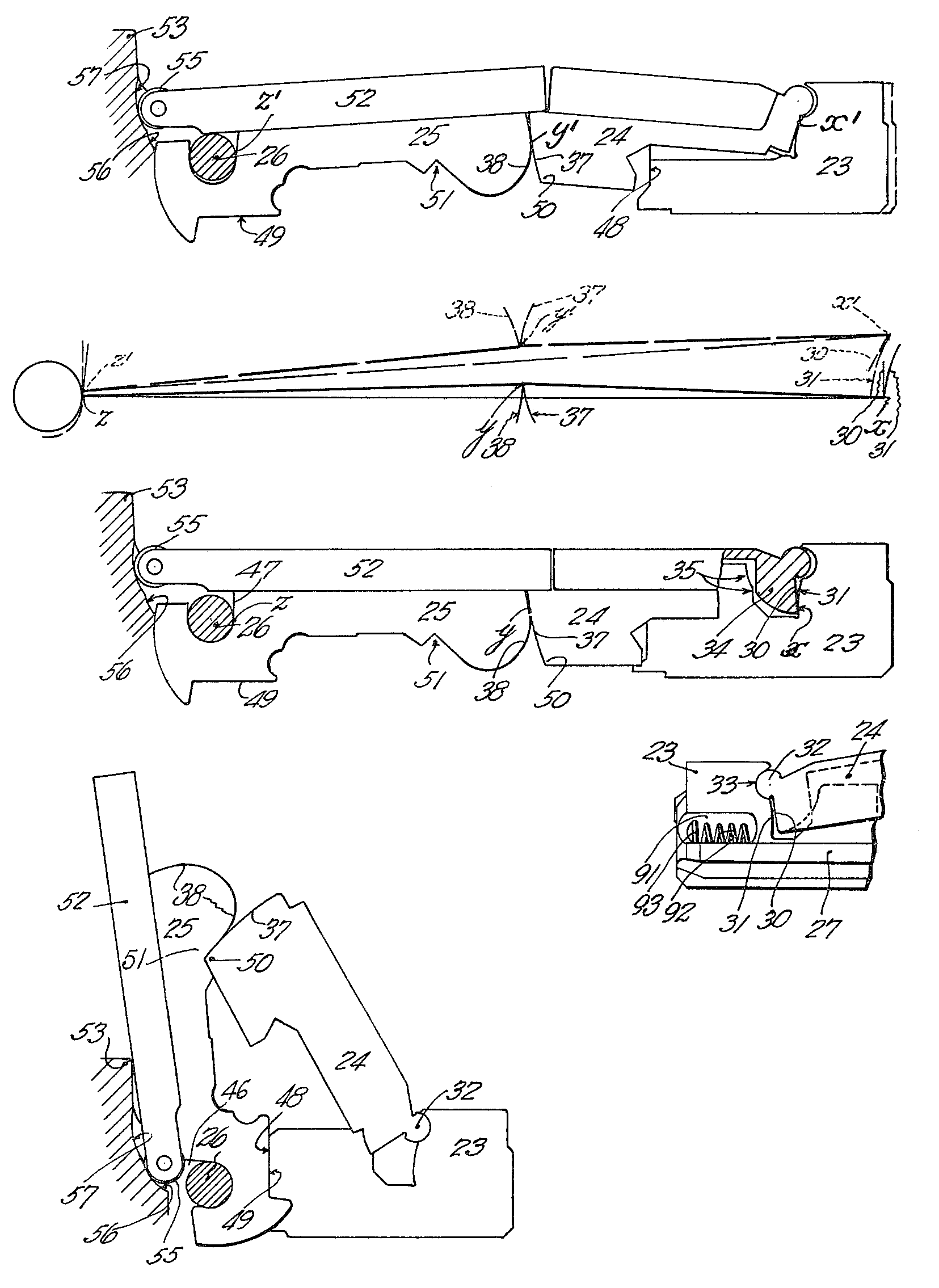
Pedersen toggle-delayed blowback action. Image from John Pedersen patent.

The conclusion of the tests, held in August 1929, saw the Board rate the T1E3 and the T3 as superior to all the others. Both rifles were found to be subject to excessive malfunctions, but the T3 was rated superior to the T1E3. Specific T1E3 defects were: failure of the breech mechanism to close, misfires, breech mechanism override (failure to feed), and breakage of a crank and a sear bar. The Board recommended manufacturing of 20 T3 rifles for service test, and in addition recommended building a caliber .30-06 version of the T3 for evaluation.

Cartridge lethality was again investigated by the “Goat Board”, this time with shooting tests on anaesthetized goats and careful measurement of entry and exit velocities. However, the test results again demonstrated no superiority of caliber .30 ammunition at normal combat ranges.

The year 1931 saw testing of the T1E3 and the twenty T3E2 rifles by the Infantry. The Infantry Board rated the T3E2 superior in effective firepower and simplicity of construction (the T3E2 had 60 parts, while the T1E3 had 99 parts). This Board, which three years earlier had recommended adoption of the T1, now favored the T3E2; it continued to favor the .276. However, the Chief of Infantry broke with the Infantry Board and stated a preference for .30 caliber.

The .30-06 Garand rifle (essentially an enlarged T3E2) was quickly built and, under the confusing designation T1E1, was tested along with the T3E2 and the Pedersen T1E3 during the remainder of 1931. The Semiautomatic Rifle Board now exhibited a notably critical attitude toward the T1E3. The Board found fault with the requirement for lubricated cartridge cases (seemingly regardless of the technical merits of Mr. Pedersen's case treatment concept), poor trigger pull, and the upward break of the breech mechanism. A more substantive complaint had to do with the complete exposure of the breech mechanism when held open—the Board correctly cited the vulnerability of the rifle to mud and dust while in this condition. The Board also reported slamfires (the Garand T3E2 was reported to dimple cartridge primers with its firing pin, but did not slamfire).

In the end, funding issues forced a decision. Faced with the possible loss of funds already authorized by Congress, the Board met for one more time in January 1932 and decided to recommend approval of the T3E2 (the .276 Garand) for limited procurement by the Army and to continue development of the T1E1 (the .30-06 Garand). With this action, the Pedersen rifle was effectively dropped from consideration. In four more years, almost to the day, an improved version of rifle T1E1 would be adopted as the M1.

As Springfield Armory tooled for and refined the Garand, Pedersen continued to work on another rifle. He developed a .30 caliber model with a conventional gas-trap piston and multi-piece operating rod system. He fought to have it tested by the U.S. Army prior to World War II. At around the same time, serious difficulties were being encountered with the Garand and questions had been raised. Both Pedersen and Melvin M. Johnson, Jr. attempted to capitalize on the troubles. Based on serial numbers, it is thought up to 12 prototype gas-trap Pedersen rifles were made. One example of the model G-Y resides at the Springfield Armory Museum.

== Foreign interest ==
Publicity of the U.S. Army's serious consideration of adopting the Pedersen rifle as standard issue generated similar interest in the rifle in the United Kingdom. Pedersen traveled to the UK in 1930 to oversee tooling up of a production facility by Vickers-Armstrong for manufacturing of rifles for test by the UK Government and for possible marketing to other countries. The UK tested the rifle in 1932 along with other prototype semiautomatic rifles, but decided not to take any further action. Vickers apparently both manufactured the rifle in small quantities and also further developed the design. A caliber .276 Vickers-Pedersen rifle offered for sale in March 2008 by the James D. Julia Auction firm was serial numbered 95, and the clip that accompanied the rifle was of a curved and symmetrical design (suitable for loading into the magazine either end up). The butt stock had a noticeably different shape than those of rifles made at Springfield Armory, but otherwise the rifle was identical to the U.S. production T1E3 and thus incorporated the design revisions covered by U.S. patent 1,866,722 to make his rifle more modular in construction and thus easier to disassemble and maintain.

=== Japanese Pedersen ===
Pedersen reportedly then went to Japan to encourage interest in his rifle by the Imperial Japanese Army, which appears to have led to the building of 12 rifles and 12 carbines for testing around 1935; the project reportedly was abandoned in 1936. These weapons were apparently made to fire the standard 6.5 mm Japanese service cartridge, and incorporated design changes which radically changed the appearance of this rifle when compared to the original T1E3 rifle. Most notable was the use of a spool-type Schoenauer magazine which formed a very pronounced swell in the stock just ahead of the trigger guard. A receiver-mounted safety lever and a stripper clip guide at the front of the breech block head are also noticeable features. A ventilated wooden handguard completely covers the barrel, while the stock furniture more resembles that of the later Type 99 rifle than the then-standard Type 38. The sights are offset to the left, although the cycling of the breech block mechanism would still momentarily interrupt the line of sight. The hinge pin was also made removable. Reportedly the Japanese Army did not really grasp the importance of case lubrication for this type of rifle, so the test rifles never really functioned satisfactorily. A carbine version, serial number 5, has been recently described in some detail. A photo of a field stripped rifle or carbine, reportedly of a specimen found in Japan at the end of World War II, has been reproduced in Hatcher's The Book of the Garand and some other gun books.

== Legacy ==
While the Pedersen rifle never achieved the status of a standard-issue weapon of the U.S. Army, the rifle did have an impact on the process by which the ultimate winner—the M1 Garand rifle—was selected. John Pedersen's work in creating and improving his rifle raised the bar for those trying to get a hearing from Army Ordnance regarding their designs. The only serious competition that the Pedersen rifle had in the end was the rifle created by John C. Garand, who like Pedersen, was a designer and engineer experienced in the particulars of production tooling.

The initial success and ultimate failure of the Pedersen rifle has sometimes been interpreted as the simple workings-out of biased or overly conservative decision-making in the face of technological innovation. However, there is little in the historical record to support such interpretations. Simply put, the Pedersen rifle had shortcomings. The rifle was complex, making concerns about mass production to an exacting standard of parts interchangeability quite legitimate. Issues revealed in Army tests were serious and inherent in the design. Certainly the concerns expressed by the Semiautomatic Rifle Board regarding the vulnerability of the operating mechanism to sand and mud when held open were very real. However, what the rifle did succeed in demonstrating was that a semiautomatic combat rifle was a realistic proposition. The initial enthusiasm of the Infantry Board for the adoption of this rifle is certainly strong testimony on this point. Bias is certainly visible in the negative attitude taken toward what was unquestionably the most innovative aspect of the rifle's development: the lubrication of the cartridge cases with Pedersen's dry wax process. The implicit equation of this process with the messy and contamination-vulnerable case oiling system used in the Thompson Rifle (also a hesitation blowback design) certainly shows a degree of obstinate conservatism. This concept may yet have potential application in firearms development even now, but it was certainly not appreciated or even liked back in the 1920s.

Some writers have implied that the Pedersen rifle was effectively killed by Chief of Staff Douglas MacArthur’s decision to require use of the .30-06 cartridge for the standard semiautomatic rifle. However, the record does not support such an interpretation. The Pedersen rifle was rejected a month before Gen. MacArthur pronounced on the subject, at a point in time when the caliber .276 T3E2 Garand rifle was the clear winner of the competition and ready for initial production. History shows MacArthur vetoed the .276 Pedersen cartridge for use in the Garand rifle.

== Description and operation ==
The Pedersen T1E3 rifle was made in two versions: an infantry rifle with a 24-inch barrel, full-length stock with an M1903-type front band, 44 inches long (twenty made); and a cavalry carbine with a 21-inch barrel and half-stocked like the Krag-Jørgensen cavalry carbine (five made). An unknown but larger number of infantry rifles were made by Vickers-Armstrong in Britain. The infantry rifle had a planned weight of 8 pounds, 2 ounces; weights of the rifles tested by the Infantry Board averaged out at 9 pounds, 2 ounces. The walnut stock had a semi pistol grip of rather shallow contour and a pronounced drop at the butt with a long cheek rest formed on top of the butt. A ventilated metal handguard covered the barrel only between the receiver and the lower band. Under the handguard was a thicken section of the barrel machined with 12 spiraling grooves, the whole design evidently intended to provide both heat sink and radiant air cooling effect. (The metal handguard was a point of criticism during Army tests due to it becoming too hot to the touch after moderate firing; the lack of uniform wood covering of the barrel was judged the cause of accuracy problems due to uneven expansion of the hot barrel). The built-in ten-round magazine included a steel lower body that protruded below the bottom of the stock approximately one inch ahead of a conventional milled steel trigger guard; this magazine body had smooth and distinctive contours that reflected both the shapes of the feed mechanism parts and the designer's evident concern for the soldier's ease of use and safety. The front sight was an unprotected M1903 blade; the rear sight, mounted at the extreme rear of the receiver, was a protected peep sight of original design adjustable for windage and elevation. The receiver was entirely open on top between the barrel ring and the rear sight mount. The stubby, flat operating handle for the toggle joint breech mechanism protruded to the right from the forward part of the crank (the rearmost part of the breech mechanism).

The breech block mechanism was made in three parts. From front to rear they were:

1. The breech block head; this part supported the cartridge base.
2. The body; this was linked to Number 1 and Number 3.
3. The crank; this was secured to the rear of the receiver with the hinge pin.

The Pedersen rifle operated on the hesitation blowback principle: energy released by firing a cartridge immediately caused the breech to start moving rearward, but mechanical leverage built into the mechanism caused the actual opening of the breech to be delayed long enough so that pressure within the barrel would fall to a safe level. This was achieved with a bearing surface machined onto the front end of the crank. As the case head pressed on the breech block head and forced it to move rearward (as guided by contact surfaces in the receiver), pressure was exerted on the body, which in turn exerted pressure on the crank. The crank had contact surfaces on its rear end which would transmit pressure to corresponding surfaces in the rear of the receiver, thus relieving the hinge pin of excessive stress. As the rear surface of the body continued to exert pressure on the bearing surface on the front of the crank, the leverage exerted would cause the crank to move about 95 degrees upward from the horizontal on the fulcrum formed by it being attached to the rear of the receiver by the hinge pin. The breech block mechanism thus operated in a manner resembling the operation of the Luger pistol, but unlike that pistol the Pedersen mechanism was at no time mechanically locked. The operating principle was the same as that used in the Model 07/12 Schwarzlose machine gun used by Austria-Hungary during the First World War.

As with all hesitation blowback weapons, the Pedersen rifle had to have some means to prevent cartridge cases from becoming stuck in the chamber due to the relatively high breech pressure and operating velocity existing at the moment of extraction. The measure adopted by the designer was the sophisticated case coating technique described earlier, which in combination with the taper of the cartridge case sides undoubtedly contributed to the high degree of reliability noted in all Army tests. Use of uncoated-case rounds (intentionally done in at least one test) caused the rifle to completely fail to function.

Starting with the rifle unloaded and the breech mechanism closed, the loading and operating cycle would be as follows.

1. Grasping the operating handle with the right hand, the operator would pull the crank up and back until vertical, at which point the hold open device would engage the underside of the breech block head. The breech return spring, entirely housed within the crank, would at this point be fully compressed.
2. An asymmetrical spring steel clip of ten rounds in a double-staggered column would then be inserted, feed end up, into the magazine against the spring pressure of the magazine follower; when fully inserted the clip would be caught and held by a catch. (Note: this clip, like the clip used in the Austrian Model 95 rifle, could only be inserted one way and thus could potentially cause confusion under the stress of combat). Unloading the magazine would be done by (if necessary) retracting and holding open the breech mechanism, then pushing the trigger forward from its neutral position; the clip and any remaining cartridges would be ejected upward.
3. By pulling back slightly on the operating handle, the operator would then free the breech block head from the hold open device and under pressure from the operating spring the breech block mechanism would straighten, driving the breech block head forward to push the topmost cartridge forward from under the feed lips of the clip, chambering the cartridge, and engaging the extraction groove around the base of the cartridge with the extractor. The extractor and the spring-loaded plunger type ejector were both built into breech block head. If the rifle was not immediately to be fired, the spring-loaded striker assembly (housed within the breech block head and body) could be locked by pushing the cross-bolt safety located in the breech body from right to left; this would also lock the breech block mechanism so that it could not be opened. (Army test reports identified the safety and the firing mechanism as weak areas of the T1 rifle: the safety, when applied, prevented clearing a loaded chamber and did not lock the trigger mechanism; the safety was also subject to damage. The striker was reported to have become stuck on some occasions, causing slam-fires).
4. With the rifle ready to fire, pressing the trigger would cause movement of a connector bar extending forward toward the magazine well; the connector bar movement would then cause the sear to move out of engagement with the striker and cause the chambered round to fire. (In common with bullpup rifles, which also separate the trigger from the firing mechanism, the T1 was reported to suffer from a relatively poor trigger pull feel; during at least one series of tests the connector bar broke). When the breech block mechanism cycled, the crank would momentarily block the line of sight (Army riflemen testing this rifle apparently got used to this effect quickly, but there were negative comments in the test reports regarding the crank striking the edge of the Brodie helmet then standard issue in the U.S. Army as well as damaging the brims of the felt campaign hats then worn as part of the field uniform).
5. When the last round in the clip was chambered and then fired, final upward movement of the magazine follower would engage the hold open device, which would catch and hold the breech block head in the open position; the empty clip would be ejected upward. The breech block mechanism could be released by depressing the follower and pulling back slightly on the operating handle. (The T1 and the Cal .276 Garand both had a tendency to hold open their actions and eject clips while one round still remained in the magazine).

Basic field stripping of the T1 rifle was simple: with the rifle unloaded and the mechanism held open, pressing on a stud on the underside of the crank would lock the breech return spring. The breech block head could then be guided up and out through inclined guide ways in the receiver and the crank then could be freed from the hinge pin, allowing the entire breech mechanism to be removed as a unit. The magazine housing would then be dismounted by pressing forward on the housing until the forward retaining lip would become free from the groove in the forward part of the receiver that it normally rested in and then rotating the housing downward. The entire trigger and feed mechanism group would then be removed by pressing a spring-loaded cross bolt at the rear of the trigger guard just below the stock; the entire assembly would then be freed to be pulled down and rearward to separate it from the receiver and stock. The general concept of the field stripping process is similar to that of the SKS carbine. The stock and barrel-receiver assembly would normally not be separated, following the pattern of rifles such as the German Model 98 Mauser or the Model 1903 Springfield.

== Serial numbers (U.S. rifles) ==
Much of the record keeping on the Pedersen and other rifles of this period is now long gone. What records the researchers at this Web site were able to find mostly appear to relate to the final period of competitive testing in 1931.

Table:

SA = Springfield Armory.

1. 2/11/31 SA
2. Carbine 2/11/31 SA
3. 2/11/31 SA; 4/11/31 SA to Ft. Benning
4. Carbine 2/11/31 SA; 4/11/31 SA to Ft. Riley
5. 2/11/31 SA; 4/11/31 SA to Ft. Benning
6. 2/11/31 SA
7. ?
8. Carbine 2/11/31 SA; 4/11/31 SA to Ft. Riley
9. 2/11/31 SA (deficient); 4/11/31 SA (being repaired)
10. 2/11/31 SA (deficient); 4/11/31 SA (being repaired)
11. 9/28/31 at Ordnance Office
12. ?
13. 8/30/27 SA to Ft. Benning
14. 2/11/31 SA; 4/11/31 SA to Ft. Benning
15. ?
16. 2/11/31 SA; 4/11/31 SA to Ft. Benning
17. 8/30/27 SA to Ft. Riley; 4/11/31 SA to Ft. Benning
18. 2/11/31 SA; 4/11/31 SA to Ft. Benning
19. 2/11/31 SA; 4/11/31 SA to Ft. Benning
20. Carbine 2/11/31 SA; 4/11/31 SA to Ft. Riley
21. 2/11/31 SA; 4/11/31 SA to Ft. Riley
22. 2/11/31 extra receiver
23. 2/11/31 sold to J D Pedersen
24. ?
25. ?

From the information in this table we apparently can identify four of the five carbines and 16 of the 20 rifles. Serial number 22 was apparently assigned to a receiver which was not in fact used for building a complete rifle; this would appear to indicate that only 19 of the 20 authorized rifles were built.

== See also ==
- Borchardt pistol
- Luger P08 pistol
- Johnson Rifle
- List of delayed-blowback firearms
- List of individual weapons of the U.S. Armed Forces
