= 7.65×20mm Long =

Type of ammunition

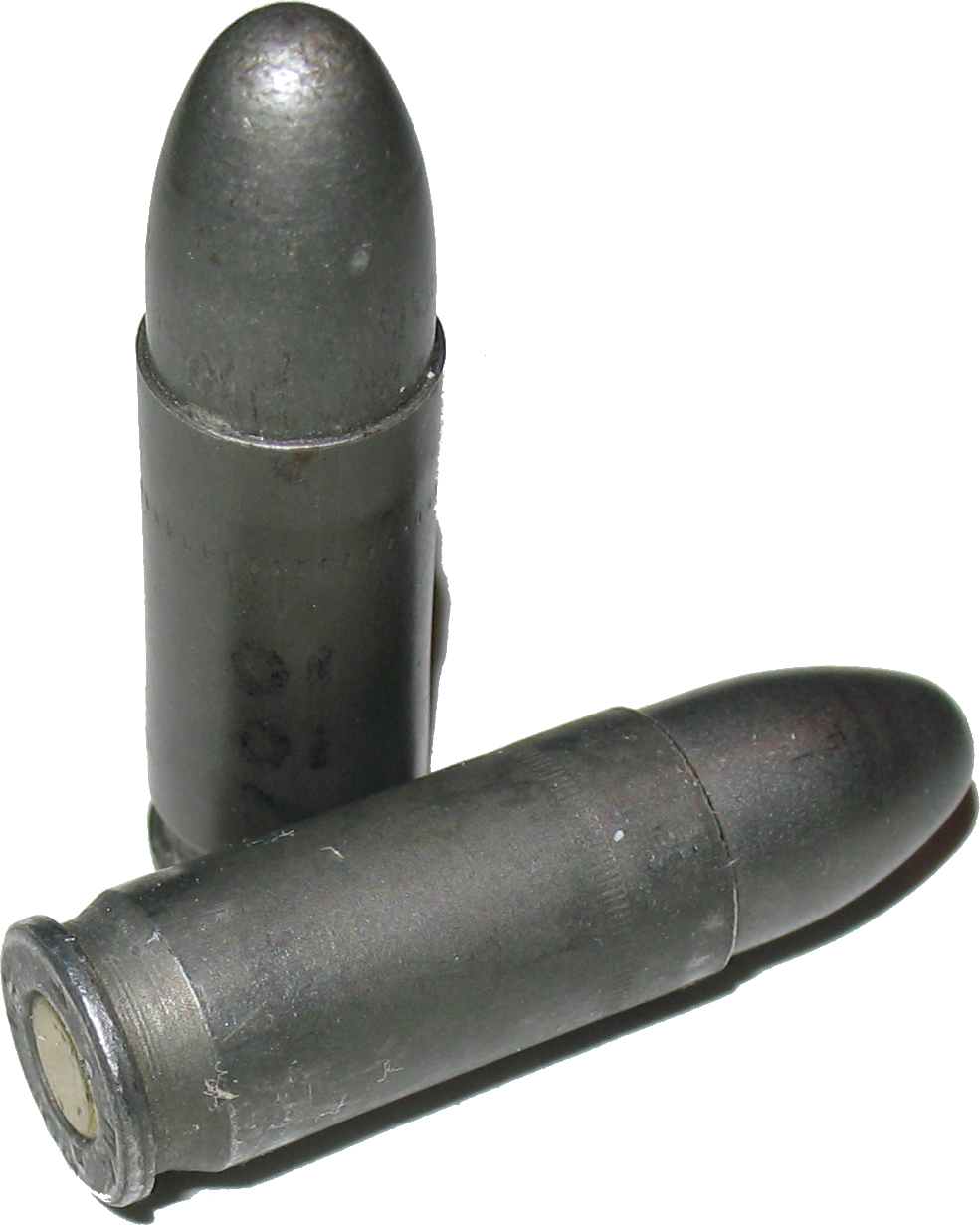
- 7.65×20mm cartridge (steel case and steel-jacketed bullet).
- Type: Rifle and pistol
- Place of origin: United States

Service history
- Used by: United States, France, Germany, Vietnam

Production history
- Designer: Remington Arms
- Designed: 1917
- Produced: 1918–1960

Specifications
- Case type: Rimless, straight
- Bullet diameter: 7.85 mm (0.309 in)
- Land diameter: 7.65 mm (0.301 in)
- Neck diameter: 8.50 mm (0.335 in)
- Base diameter: 8.53 mm (0.336 in)
- Rim diameter: 8.50 mm (0.335 in)
- Case length: 19.70 mm (0.776 in)
- Overall length: 30.24 mm (1.191 in)
- Primer type: Small pistol

Ballistic performance
| Bullet mass/type | Velocity | Energy |
|---|---|---|
| 77 gr (5 g) FMJ | 1,132 ft/s (345 m/s) | 219 ft⋅lbf (297 J) |

The 7.65×20mm Long (also known as 7.65mm French Long/Longue, 7.65mm MAS, 7.65×20mm, 7.65L, and .30-18 Auto for use in the Pedersen Device) was a straight, rimless cartridge used in the French Modèle 1935 pistol, as well as the MAS-38 submachine gun and the ETVS submachine gun.

== Description ==
The cartridge was developed for the United States and secretly produced in quantity too late for its intended use during World War I. The United States scrapped the weapons built for the cartridge between the world wars. France adopted weapons for the cartridge and those weapons saw combat use; so the cartridge is best known by its French name.

The French military were introduced to the cartridge when the US demonstrated the Pedersen device after the end of World War I in Le Mans and again when John Browning exhibited a carbine in the same caliber in 1920. The US .30 Pedersen cartridge (auto pistol ball cartridge caliber .30 Model of 1918 or .30-18 Automatic) used in the Pedersen device was the basis for the 7.65×20mm Long. The cartridge dimensions were identical, although Pedersen device cartridges were loaded with a slightly heavier 80 grains (5.2 g) bullet which achieved a velocity of 1,300 feet per second (400 m/s) in the longer barrel of M1903 Springfield rifles.

Remington Arms produced 65 million cartridges for the Pedersen device between 1918 and 1920. French 7.65×20mm Long ammunition was manufactured in quantity from approximately 1935 to 1960.

In 2019, Steinel Ammunition began producing new 7.65×20mm Long, making the ammunition available again.

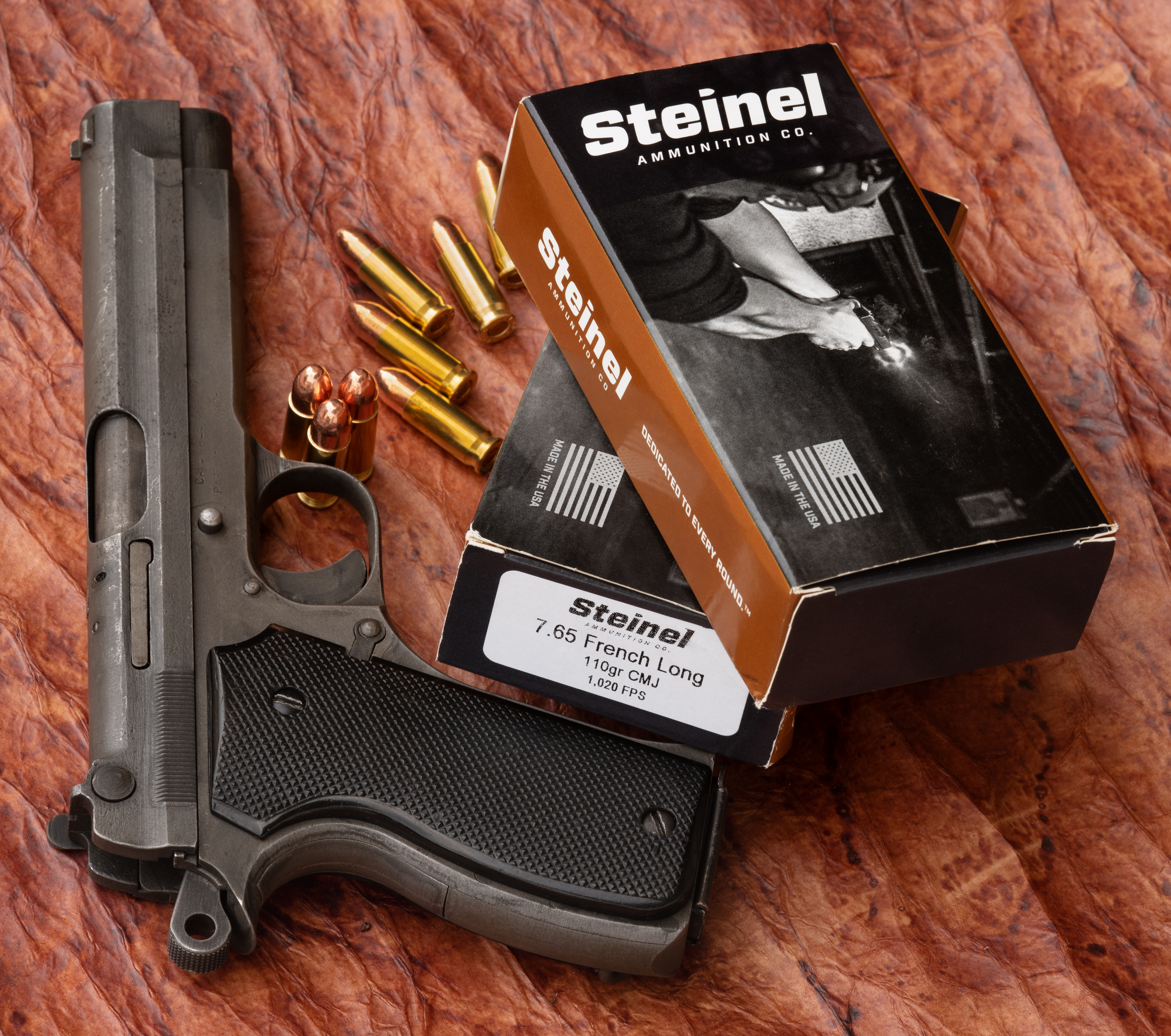
Current production FMJ 7.65×20mm Long ammunition

== Comparison with the .30 Super Carry ==
In 2022, Federal Ammunition introduced the .30 Super Carry cartridge for use in pistols as a competitor to the 9x19 Parabellum. While extremely similar in size, the .30 Super Carry is too large and too powerful to use in original French firearms.

== See also ==
- .30 Super Carry
- 7 mm caliber
- 7.65 mm caliber
- List of handgun cartridges
