= John Pedersen (arms designer) =

American firearms designer

John Douglas Pedersen
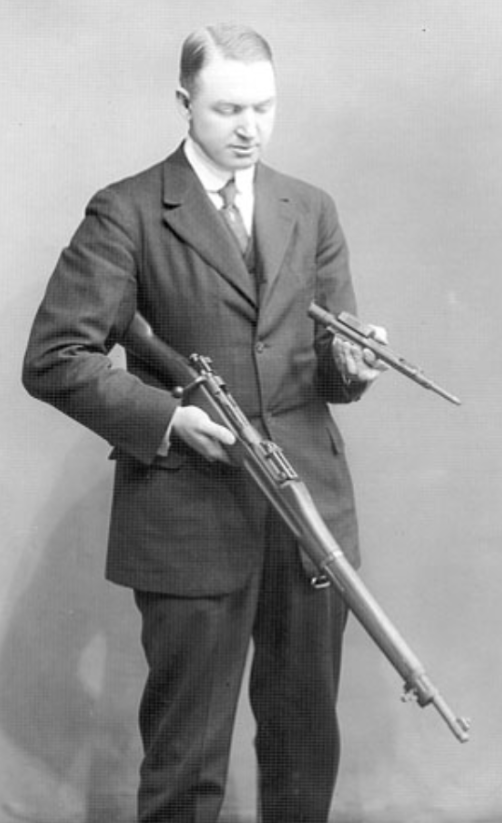
- Pedersen holding a modified Springfield M1903 with the Pedersen Device. c. 1917-1918
- Born: May 21, 1881; Grand Island, Nebraska
- Died: May 23, 1951 (aged 70); Cottonwood, Arizona
- Occupation: Arms designer
- Known for: Pedersen device

John Douglas Pedersen (May 21, 1881 – May 23, 1951) was a prolific arms designer who worked for Remington Arms, and later for the United States Government. Famed gun designer John Moses Browning told Maj. Gen. Julian S. Hatcher of U.S. Army Ordnance that Pedersen "was the greatest gun designer in the world".

== Early career ==
Pedersen is best known for the 1918 Pedersen device that converted a standard military Springfield 1903 rifle to a semi-automatic, pistol-caliber firearm.

He designed several successful sporting guns for Remington, including the novel Model 51 pistol, the Model 10 pump-action shotgun and the Models 12, 14, and 25 pump-action rifles. He collaborated with John Browning to design the Model 17 pump-action shotgun. The Model 17 was a trim, 20-gauge shotgun that was later redesigned and made in three highly successful forms: the Remington Model 31, Browning BPS, and the Ithaca 37.

Pedersen designed two well received U.S. military firearms from the 20th century. His .45 caliber automatic pistol, based on the same design as the Model 51, was accepted by the Navy Board for production, but the First World War intervened and Remington tooled to produce the M1911 instead. He also designed a competing design to the M1 Garand rifle. His design utilized a toggle-lock and patented waxed cartridges. The Garand was selected instead. His "Pedersen rifle" was also trial tested by the British and Japanese between World War I and World War II, but it was not adopted. The ammunition he developed, the .276 Pedersen (7×51mm) waxed round was an experimental 7 mm cartridge developed for the U.S. Army and used in the Pedersen rifle.

Pedersen was issued 69 patents listing his home as Wyoming, and others listing Colorado and New York State.

== World War II ==
During the early days of America's involvement in World War II, Pedersen formed a company with the Irwin family, who owned successful furniture manufacturing concerns in Grand Rapids, Michigan. The Irwin-Pedersen Arms Company in that city was capitalized for $1,000,000.00, by the brothers Robert and Earl Irwin. Primarily through Pedersen's contacts in the Ordnance Department, the Irwin-Pedersen Arms Company received a contract to manufacture over 100,000 M1 Carbines to be produced at the rate of 1,000 per day after the Grand Rapids factory was tooled up and in full production.

Unfortunately, due to faulty management and a host of other difficulties, the company failed to achieve mass production and produced slightly over 3,500 M1 Carbines. None of these carbines met Ordnance Department standards and thus none were accepted for the military. In March 1943, the Ordnance Department cancelled the contract it had with the Irwin-Pedersen Arms Company. The Irwin-Pedersen's production facilities were taken over by another contractor, Saginaw Steering Gear Division of General Motors, on April 1, 1943. Today, Irwin-Pedersen M-1 Carbines are among the rarest versions of the M1 Carbine and as such, I-P Carbines usually command premium prices in collector's circles.

At the start of the Korean War, his son Eric Pedersen joined the United States Marine Corps and served as a lieutenant in combat in Korea. He is memorialized in the book Reckless: Pride of the Marines. Lt. Pedersen led a recoilless rifle platoon and at his own expense purchased a racehorse for use as an ammunition carrier. The horse became famous in the 1st Marine Division. Reckless became the first horse to participate in a Marine amphibious landing, was promoted through the ranks from private to corporal to sergeant, and at the war's end was shipped to Camp Pendleton, California, where she lived out her retirement as a beloved mascot.

== Legacy ==
Pedersen's sporting designs for Remington are recognized by contemporary shooters and collectors.

Many of Pedersen's U.S. military efforts were stymied by fate. Although the Navy recommended adoption of his .45 pistol design, the outbreak of World War I led to the design being shelved in favor of the M1911 pistol already in production for the Army. His most famous invention, the Pedersen Device, never had a chance to significantly affect the battles on the Western Front during World War I: the war ended before it could be manufactured in quantity and sent to France to equip the American Army (only 65,000 were produced out of planned production of 500,000). In the 1920s U.S. Army Ordnance selected his .276 Pedersen cartridge to replace the .30-06 in the infantry rifle and tested Pedersen's unique toggle-linked semi-automatic rifle in competitions at Aberdeen Proving Ground. The Pedersen rifle lost out to the rifle designed by John C. Garand. General MacArthur later vetoed the adoption of .276 Pedersen as the new infantry cartridge. General George S. Patton owned a Remington Model 51 and was thought to favor the weapon and is seen in many photos of the era wearing it as his personal sidearm. During World War II, John Pedersen's attempts through the Irwin-Pedersen Arms Company to mass-produce M1 Carbines for the U.S. military failed.
