= .30 Remington =

American rifle cartridge

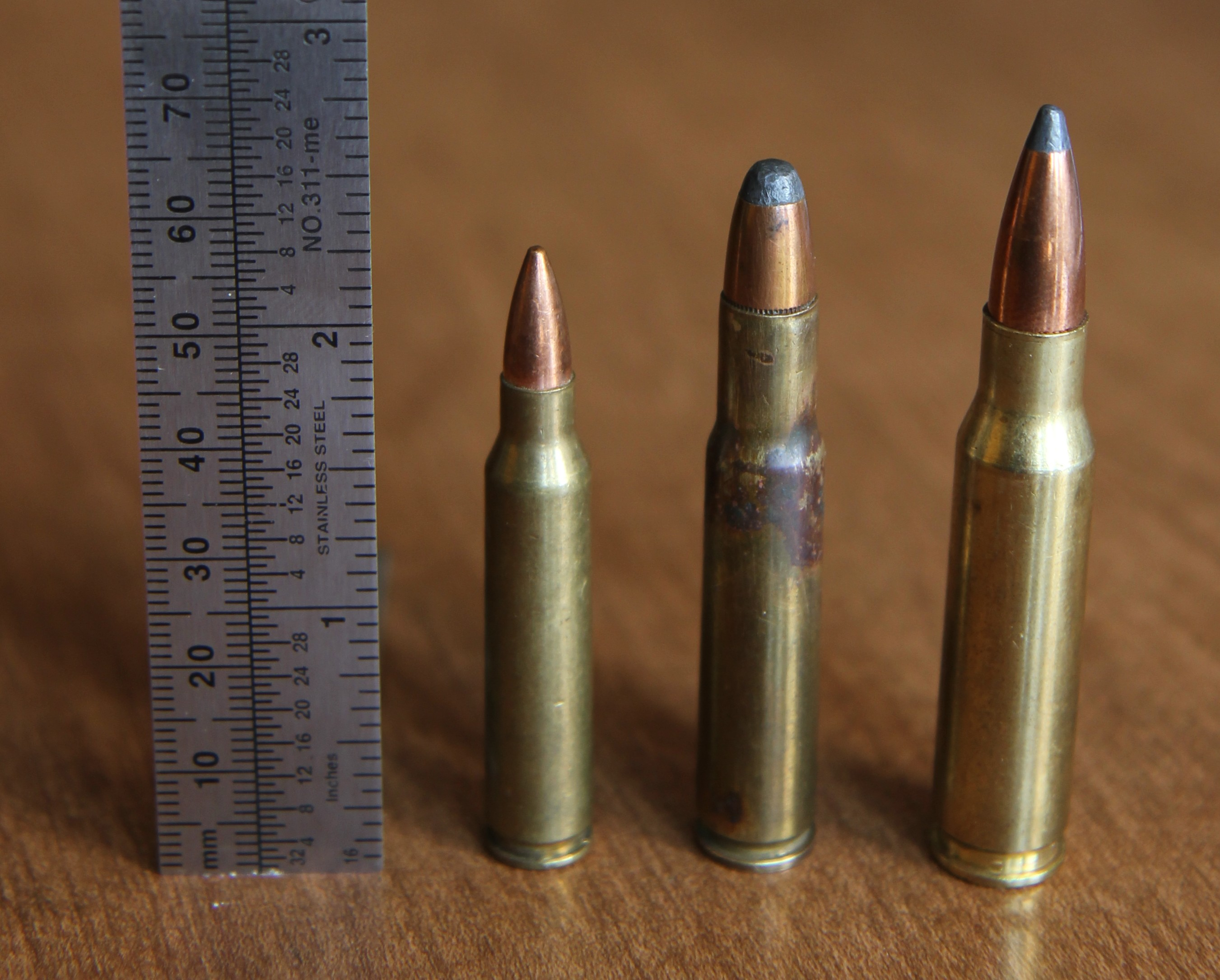
- .30 Remington (center) with .223 Rem (left) and .308 Win (right).
- Type: Rifle
- Place of origin: United States

Production history
- Designer: Remington Arms
- Designed: 1906
- Manufacturer: Remington Arms
- Produced: 1906–1980s

Specifications
- Case type: Rimless
- Bullet diameter: .308 in (7.8 mm)
- Base diameter: .421 in (10.7 mm)
- Rim diameter: .422 in (10.7 mm)
- Rim thickness: .045 in (1.1 mm)
- Case length: 2.06 in (52 mm)
- Overall length: 2.525 in (64.1 mm)
- Maximum CUP: 38,000 CUP

Ballistic performance
Bullet mass/type	Velocity	Energy
150 gr (10 g) Core-Lokt Round Nose	2,123 ft/s (647 m/s)	1,500 ft⋅lbf (2,000 J)
150 gr (10 g) Core-Lokt Round Nose	2,364 ft/s (721 m/s)	1,859 ft⋅lbf (2,520 J)
170 gr (11 g) Core-Lokt HP RN	1,893 ft/s (577 m/s)	1,350 ft⋅lbf (1,830 J)
170 gr (11 g) Core-Lokt HP RN	2,114 ft/s (644 m/s)	1,682 ft⋅lbf (2,280 J)
- Test barrel length: 22"; Source(s): http://www.chuckhawks.com/30_Rem.htm

The .30 Remington / 7.8x52mm cartridge was created in 1906 by Remington Arms. It was Remington's rimless answer to the popular .30-30 Winchester cartridge. Factory ammunition was produced until the late 1980s, but now it is a prospect for handloaders. It is the parent case for the 6.8mm Remington SPC, which is in turn the parent case for the .224 Valkyrie and the .22 PDK.

The .30 Remington, along with the 25 Remington, .32 Remington. and .35 Remington were created for use in the Remington Model 8 rifle, to compete against the .25-35 Winchester, .30-30 Winchester and .32 Winchester Special. The Remington Model 14 was also chambered for the four new Remington cartridges.

Unlike the .30-30, the .30 Remington can utilize standard pointed bullets rather than round nosed ones when used in rifles with box magazines (Remington Model 8) and ones with special tubular magazines (Remington Model 14). This gives it a possible advantage over the .30-30 cartridge which is most often chambered in lever-action rifles with standard tubular magazines (in which a conventional pointed bullet could lead to cartridges being ignited in the magazine tube by recoiling into a primer).

== See also ==
- List of rifle cartridges
