= ETVS submachine gun =

Pistolet Mitrailleur Modèle ETVS
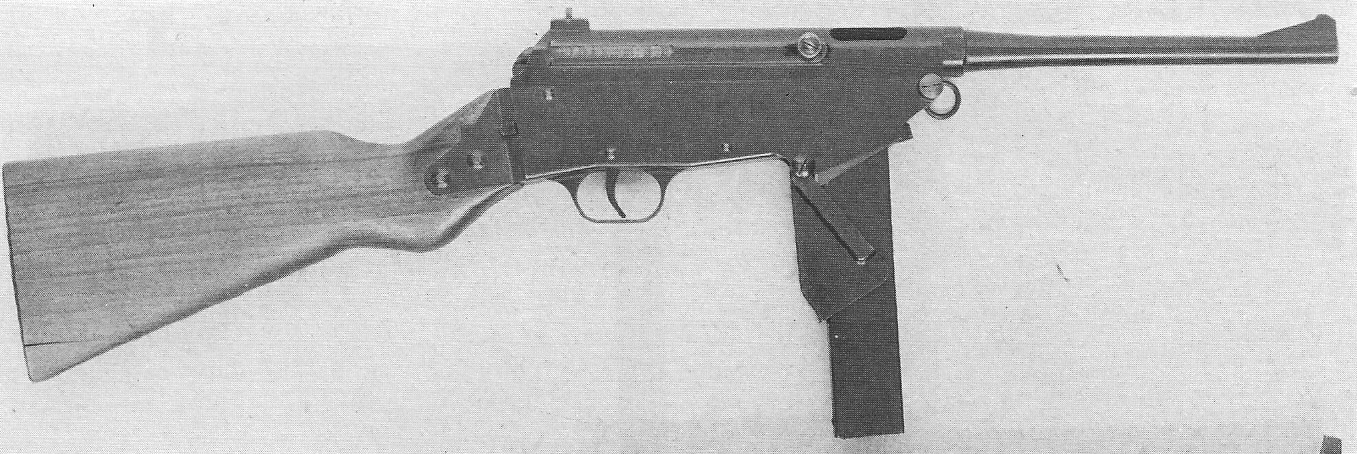
- Type: Submachine gun
- Place of origin: France

Service history
- Used by: France; Germany (Captured)
- Wars: World War II

Production history
- Designer: Captain Martin
- Designed: 1933
- Manufacturer: Établissement Technique de Versailles
- Produced: 1933–1939
- No. built: 100

Specifications
- Mass: 5.95 kilograms (13.1 pounds)
- Length: Stock extended: 26.4 inches (67 centimetres); Stock folded: 16.5 inches (42 centimetres)
- Barrel length: 8.27 inches (21.0 centimetres)
- Cartridge: 7.65×20mm Longue
- Caliber: 7.65
- Action: Blowback
- Rate of fire: 500rpm
- Muzzle velocity: 380 metres per second (1,200 feet per second)
- Feed system: 32-round detachable box magazine

The Pistolet Mitrailleur Modèle ETVS, also known as the Type ETVS or simply the ETVS, was a French prototype submachine gun designed by Captain Marlin and produced by the Établissement Technique de Versailles. It was used during World War II.

== History ==
The ETVS was developed in the 1930s in response to a commission from the French Army, who at that time were looking for a submachine gun for military service. It was trialed against other submachine gun designs, including the Petter Mle 39 and the MAS-38. The ETVS was considered inferior to these weapons and was rejected. Development of the ETVS gun ceased after its rejection from military trials.

When World War II broke out, neither the MAS-38 nor the Mle 39 had been produced in significant quantities to arm enough soldiers. The French Army was very short on submachine guns. The Army hurriedly brought Thompson submachine guns from the United States and pressed any available submachine guns they had into service. This included about 50–100 ETVS trial submachine guns. These guns were captured by the Wehrmacht after the Battle of France and pressed into German service as the Maschinenpistole 721(f). Due to its unique chambering, the Maschinenpistole 721(f) was mainly use by occupation divisions in occupied France.

== Design ==
The ETVS was a blowback-operated submachine gun chambered for the French 7.65×20mm Longue cartridge. It was designed to be compact and easy to carry, and featured a folding stock and folding magazine which wasn't a feature on the majority of submachine guns of the time.
