= 7.65 mm caliber =

7.65mm may refer to the following firearms cartridges:

- .32 ACP (7.65×17mm Browning)
- 7.65mm Roth–Sauer
- 7.65×20mm Longue
- 7.65×21mm Parabellum
- 7.65×21mm Mannlicher
- 7.65×25mm Borchardt
- 7.65×53mm Mauser
