= Pedersen index =

Measure of political volatility

The Pedersen index is a measure of political volatility in party systems. It was described by Mogens Pedersen in a paper published in 1979 entitled The Dynamics of European Party Systems: Changing Patterns of Electoral Volatility. Pedersen index can be used as an indicator of a change in the party system and to evaluate a change in voter preferences.

== What the index means ==
"The net change within the electoral party system resulting from individual vote transfers"

== Construction of the index ==
The Pedersen index is calculated as

$\mathrm{V} = \frac{1}{2} \sum_{i=1}^n | p_{i,t}-p_{i,t+1} |,$

where $p_{i,t}$ is the percentage of votes for political party $i$ at election $t$ and $p_{i,t+1}$ is the value for the next election. To calculate the index, the percentage gains of the winning parties must be determined. The resulting index will be between 0 (no parties gained, and thus no parties lost either) and 100 (all the parties from the last election were reduced to zero votes), because for every gain there is an equal (in terms of percentage of votes) loss. In other words, the index is equal to the net percentage of voters who changed their votes. ("Net percentage," because if the only change is a Party A voter switching to Party B, and a Party B voter switching to Party A, there is no net volatility.) The index can also be constructed by summing the absolute values of all gains and all losses, and dividing this total by two.

The political volatility measured by the Pedersen index differs from the political volatility when parliamentary seats are considered due to the differing seats-to-votes ratios. The Pedersen index can overestimate the political volatility for countries with newly formed parliamentary groups made of previously existing political parties. Other measures differ in their estimates of political volatility.

=== Example ===
Assume that in the first election the Blue Party won 65%, the Orange Party won 25%, and the Fuchsia Party won 10%. Furthermore, assume that in the second election the Blue Party won 65%, the Orange Party won 15%, and the Fuchsia Party won 20%.

Election\Party	Blue	Orange	Fuchsia
1st	65%	25%	10%
2nd	65%	15%	20%
Gain/Loss	0	-10	10

The index would be equal to Blue gains (none) plus Orange's loss (10% since we do not consider sign differences) plus Fuchsia gains (10%). We then multiply it by 1/2 or divide by 2 for a total volatility of 10%.

If all three parties had disappeared in the next election, and been replaced by the Red Party (75%) and the Black Party (25%), the volatility would have been 100%: The first three lose all (100%) + the Red Party gaining 75% and the Black Party 25% since the previous election (when they both received no votes.) 100+100 = 200 -> divide by 2 = 100

== Countries ==
The Pedersen indices for individual countries are listed below, only the last available index is shown. The Pedersen index tends to decrease for some countries with increasing number of consecutive elections.

Country	Year	Pedersen index
Argentina	2011	25.1
Austria	2010	7.3
Australia	2010	7.3
Bolivia	2009	35.9
Brazil	2010	18.2
Bulgaria	2009	39.9
Chile	2009	13.9
Colombia	2010	15.9
Costa Rica	2010	29.0
Czech Republic	2010	27.7
Dominican Republic	2010	32.3
Ecuador	2009	33.0
Estonia	2011	32.5
El Salvador	2012	15.5
Germany	2009	8.3
Honduras	2009	7.8
Hungary	2010	25.1
Israel	2009	20.9
India	2009	25.1
Italy	2008	15.2
Japan	2009	14.2
Latvia	2011	36.4
Lithuania	2012	39.7
Republic of Macedonia	2011	32.0
Malaysia	2008	13.7
Mexico	2009	21.0
Mongolia	2008	24.3
Netherlands	2010	13.4
Paraguay	2008	25.6
Romania	2008	36.9
Sweden	2009	8.4
Singapore	2011	10.8
South Korea	2012	29.3
Taiwan	2012	16.9
Thailand	2010	27.2
Trinidad and Tobago	2011	25.1
United Kingdom	2010	7.6
United States	2010	3.4
Uruguay	2009	14.6
Venezuela	2010	34.5

== Limitations ==
The "simple and straightforward" way of calculation defined by Pedersen can yield widely varying results in practical cases based on subtle assumptions made by different scholars for "inclusion, aggregation and linkage" due to judgments made on party continuity (or perceived lack thereof).

Both the original Pedersen's method of the 1970s and its improvements suggested in the 2000s (separation of party entry/exit) assume that the parties themselves are stable. Once the splits and mergers become predominant (as is the case, for example, in many countries of the Central Europe in the 21st century, the results provided by the Pedersen's formula will be choices made answering the question like "is the party B a successor to party A?"

== Sources ==
- Pedersen, Mogens N. (1979). "The Dynamics of European Party Systems: Changing Patterns of Electoral Volatility". European Journal of Political Research. 7 (1): 1–26.an excerpt from the original Pedersen's paper
- Casal Bértoa, Fernando; Deegan-Krause, Kevin; Haughton, Tim (October 2016). The Volatility of Volatility: Assessing Uses of the Pedersen Index to Measure Changes in Party Vote Shares (PDF). NICEP Working Paper. Nottingham: Nottingham Interdisciplinary Centre for Economic and Political Research. ISSN 2397-9771.
