= Political stability =

Smoothly functioning political system

Political stability is a situation characterized by the preservation of an intact and smoothly functioning government or political system, avoiding significant disruptions or changes over an extended duration. Political stability signifies a state of tranquility, organization, and sustained continuity within the political domain. It is marked by consistent institutions and policies, as well as a commitment to upholding the rule of law.

Societies with political stability experience a decreased probability of encountering major political upheavals, civil unrest, or sudden changes in leadership. Political stability is essential for a nation's development, economic growth, and social unity. It enables long-term planning, investment, and prosperity, as businesses and citizens can rely on consistent governance and policies.

== Measurement ==
The World Bank measures political stability within its Worldwide Governance Indicators developed by economist Daniel Kaufmann. The indicator also includes measurement of the absence of violence or terrorism.

This aims to capture perceptions of the likelihood that the government will be destabilized or overthrown by unconstitutional or violent means, including political violence or terrorism. This combines metrics from surveys and expert assessments from the World Bank and other institutions, such as NGOs, to produce a score by country and year. It does not measure the instability democracies may face with frequent elections or changes of government.

== Effect ==
A 2024 study examining Central Asia identified several factors that influence stability (using the WGI indicator). The research finds that rule of law, personalist rule, media freedom, freedom of assembly, political polarization, and gross domestic product (GDP) growth had positive effects on political stability. On the other hand, government accountability, exclusions by social group, and civil society participation were associated with negative effects on stability.

== See also ==
- Country risk – Risk of investing or lending in a country
- Economic stability – Absence of excessive fluctuations in the macroeconomy
- Hegemonic stability theory – Theory of international relations
- Legal risk – Type of operational risk
- Pedersen index – Measure of political volatility
- Political decay
- Political risk – Probability of adverse effects of political decisions
- Social cohesion – Bonding between members of a group
