= .276 Pedersen =

American experimental military rifle cartridge

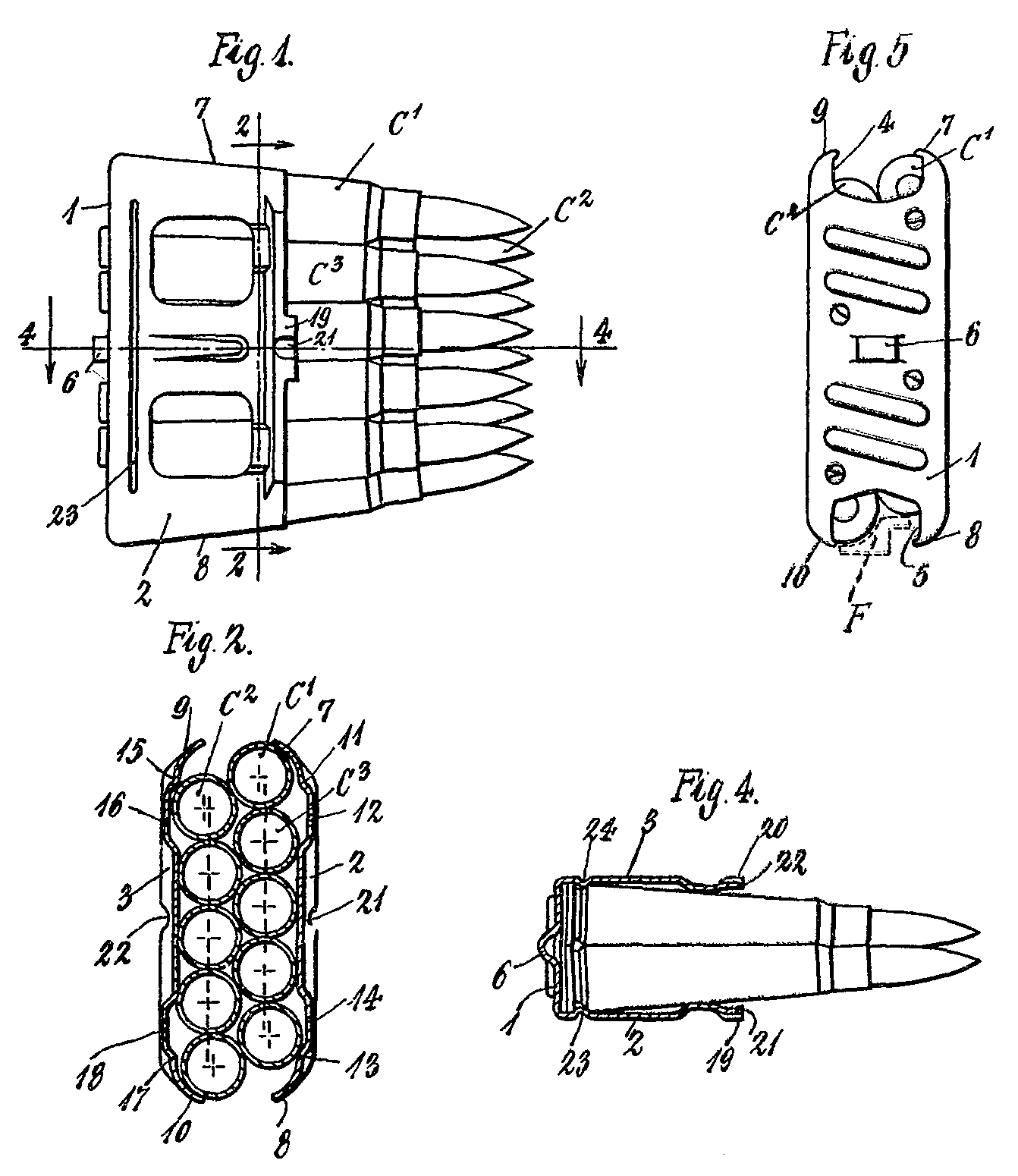
- En-bloc clip loaded with 10 rounds of .276 Pedersen. Image from John Pedersen patent.
- Type: Rifle
- Place of origin: United States

Service history
- In service: 1923–1932 (experimental)
- Used by: United States

Production history
- Designer: John Pedersen
- Designed: 1923

Specifications
- Case type: Rimless, bottleneck
- Bullet diameter: .2842 in (7.22 mm)
- Neck diameter: .313 in (8.0 mm)
- Shoulder diameter: .385 in (9.8 mm)
- Base diameter: .450 in (11.4 mm)
- Rim diameter: .450 in (11.4 mm)
- Case length: 2.023 in (51.4 mm)
- Overall length: 2.855 in (72.5 mm)
- Primer type: Large rifle

Ballistic performance
Bullet mass/type	Velocity	Energy
125 gr (8 g)	2,740 ft/s (840 m/s)	2,058 ft⋅lbf (2,790 J)

The .276 Pedersen (7×51mm) round was an experimental 7 mm cartridge developed for the United States Army. It was used in the Pedersen rifle, later versions of the Thompson Autorifle and early versions of what would become the M1 Garand.

== Summary ==
Developed in 1923 in the United States, it was intended to replace the .30-06 Springfield in new semi-automatic rifles and machine guns. When first recommended for adoption, M1 Garand rifles were chambered for the .276 Pedersen, which held ten rounds in its unique en-bloc clips. The .276 Pedersen was a shorter, lighter and lower pressure round than the .30-06, which made the design of an autoloading rifle easier than the long, powerful .30-06. The U.S. Army Chief of Staff Gen. Douglas MacArthur rejected the .276 Pedersen Garand in 1932 after verifying that a .30-06 version was feasible.

== History and technical notes ==
Pedersen's round fired a 0.284-inch (7.22mm) bullet. Comparable to the contemporary Italian 6.5×52mm (0.268 in) Carcano or the Japanese 6.5mm (0.264 in) Arisaka, it produced velocities of around 2,400 feet per second (730 m/s) with 140 or 150 grain (9.1 or 9.7 g) projectiles. The case was two inches (51 mm) long with significant taper. Tapered cases simplify the extraction, but require the use of highly curved magazines similar to the Kalashnikov, although for the short magazines of the Pedersen and Garand rifles, this was immaterial. Both waxed and bare cartridges were made for the Pedersen and Garand rifle respectively. An armor-piercing T1 cartridge was developed and presumably a tracer.

At the time of its introduction, the .276 Pedersen was a solution to a significant problem. The U.S. Army wanted a general issue autoloading rifle that would fire the .30-06 cartridge, but such a rifle was prohibitively large with existing designs such as the Browning Automatic Rifle and French Chauchat. A weapon of the same weight as the M1903 needed to fire a smaller cartridge. Pedersen's cartridge was viewed as a compromise as it was underpowered compared to most military rifle cartridges. This decreased recoil energy made possible a reliable, lightweight semi-automatic rifle with existing technology. Despite overcoming these early semi-automatic problems, the Garand was chosen because it did not require the use of lubricated cartridge cases for reliable function. The Garand was originally going to be chambered in the .276 Pedersen, but the logistics of changing all of the infantry's guns (including machine guns) to a new round was judged cost-prohibitive, so the Garand was chambered in .30-06, removing the need for the new cartridge.

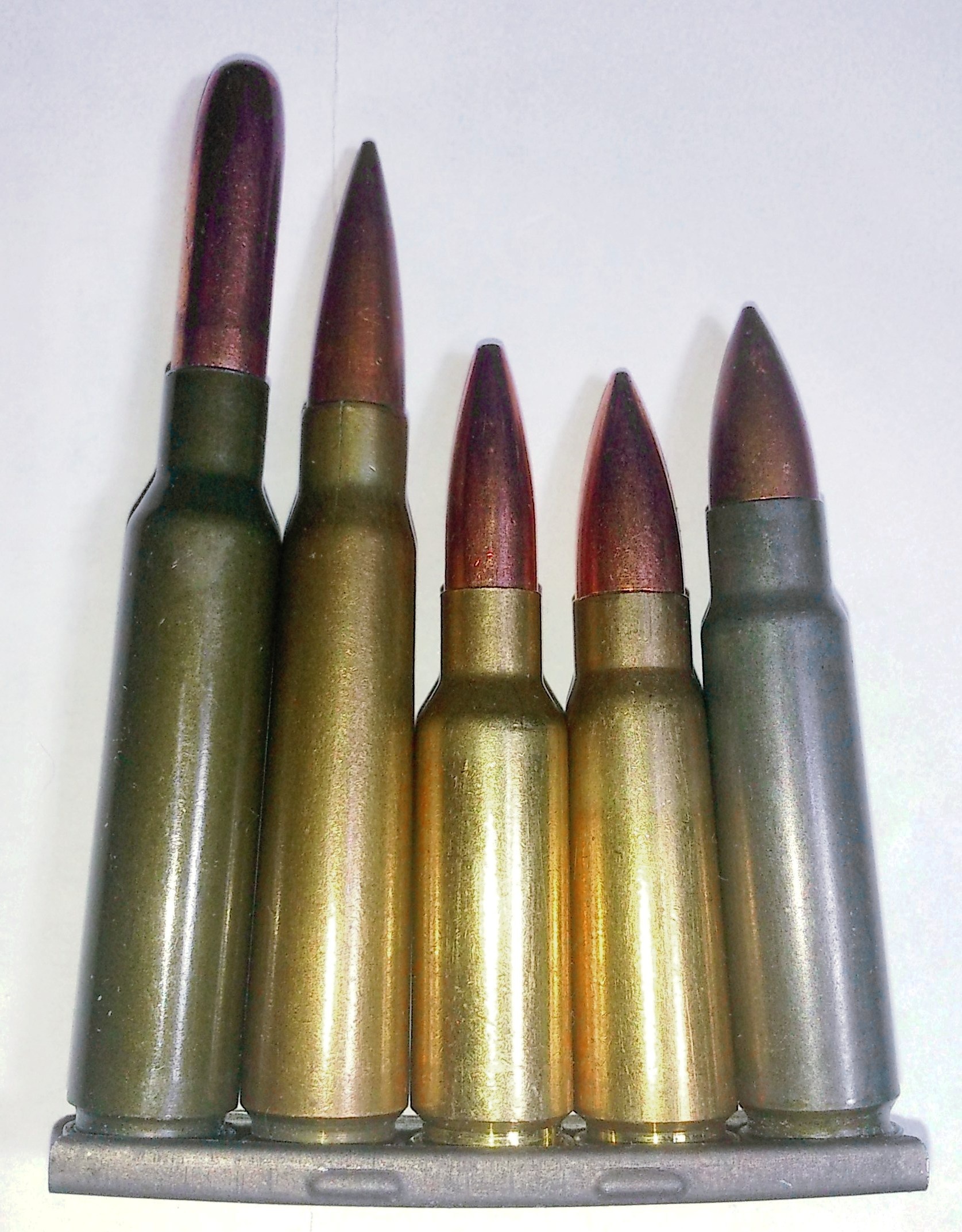
Visual comparison of: 6.5×52mm Mannlicher–Carcano; .276 Pedersen; 6.5mm Grendel; 7.62×39mm (Yugoslavian M67 load); Czech vz. 52 7.62×45mm; All developed over a 100+ year period. Note the similar base and rim diameters between all of these cartridges, and the much more pointed nose of the .276 Petersen round.

Immediately after World War II, British designers introduced a series of intermediate-power 7mm cartridges for a different reason than Pedersen. They sought an answer to the Germans' highly successful 7.92mm Kurz and various studies on the matter. The U.S. stuck with the .30 caliber mostly out of a desire to have a common cartridge between rifle and machine gun combined with the perceived necessity for effectiveness out to 2,000 yards and perforation of intermediate barriers. Development of a shorter .30 round specifically for use in an autoloading rifle began after the war, and resulted in the 7.62×51mm NATO, a shorter and slightly lighter round that gave slightly superior ballistics to the .30-06. The British studies on various cartridges culminated in the .280 British cartridge, which shared logistic similarities to the .276 Pedersen in caliber, bullet weight and velocity, but not in range, Ballistic Coefficient or wounding power.

Despite the failure to adopt either the .276 Pedersen or later .280 British, the concept of an intermediate power military cartridge of a 6.5 to 7mm diameter was far from dead. Shortly after the 7.62mm NATO cartridge was adopted, Armalite submitted their AR-10 for evaluation, the U.S. Army suggested they redesign the gun to fire a .256 caliber projectile. Although this suggestion was fruitless, the Army later engaged in many studies of a 6mm SAW cartridge. They, once again, sought to replace autoloading rifle and machine gun cartridges with one round.

Nearly 100 years after the .276 Pedersen introduced the concept of a 7mm infantry round for semi-automatic rifles, on April 19, 2022, the United States Army adopted the .277 Fury (6.8x51mm Common) as the United States Army's general-purpose cartridge, this cartridge features a 7.04 mm bullet in a two-part version of a necked down 7.62x51mm NATO case. It has a stainless steel head and a brass body to withstand the huge increase in pressure required to attain the perforation, wounding and flatness of trajectory to the required ranges. The adoption of this round repudiates the Army's 1923 conclusion about concerning the adoption of the .30 caliber standard (then signified by the rejection of the .276 Pedersen) compared to a .276 caliber round (7mm caliber), and finally returns ballistic performance in front of General Douglas MacArthur's cost-saving decision to scrap a 7mm bullet in favor of military surplus 30-06 ammunition left over from World War One as the primary cartridge to be used in the M1 Garand during World War Two. The new 7-mm .277 Fury round will be deployed both in an infantry battle rifle as well as in a dedicated machine gun and exemplifies the requirement of the much higher chamber pressure, 80-90,000 PSI Vs 55-60,000 PSI in the older ammunition required to attain the demanded ballistic performance with a 7-mm bullet in both weapon systems.

== See also ==
- 7 mm caliber
