= .25 Remington =

Rifle cartridge

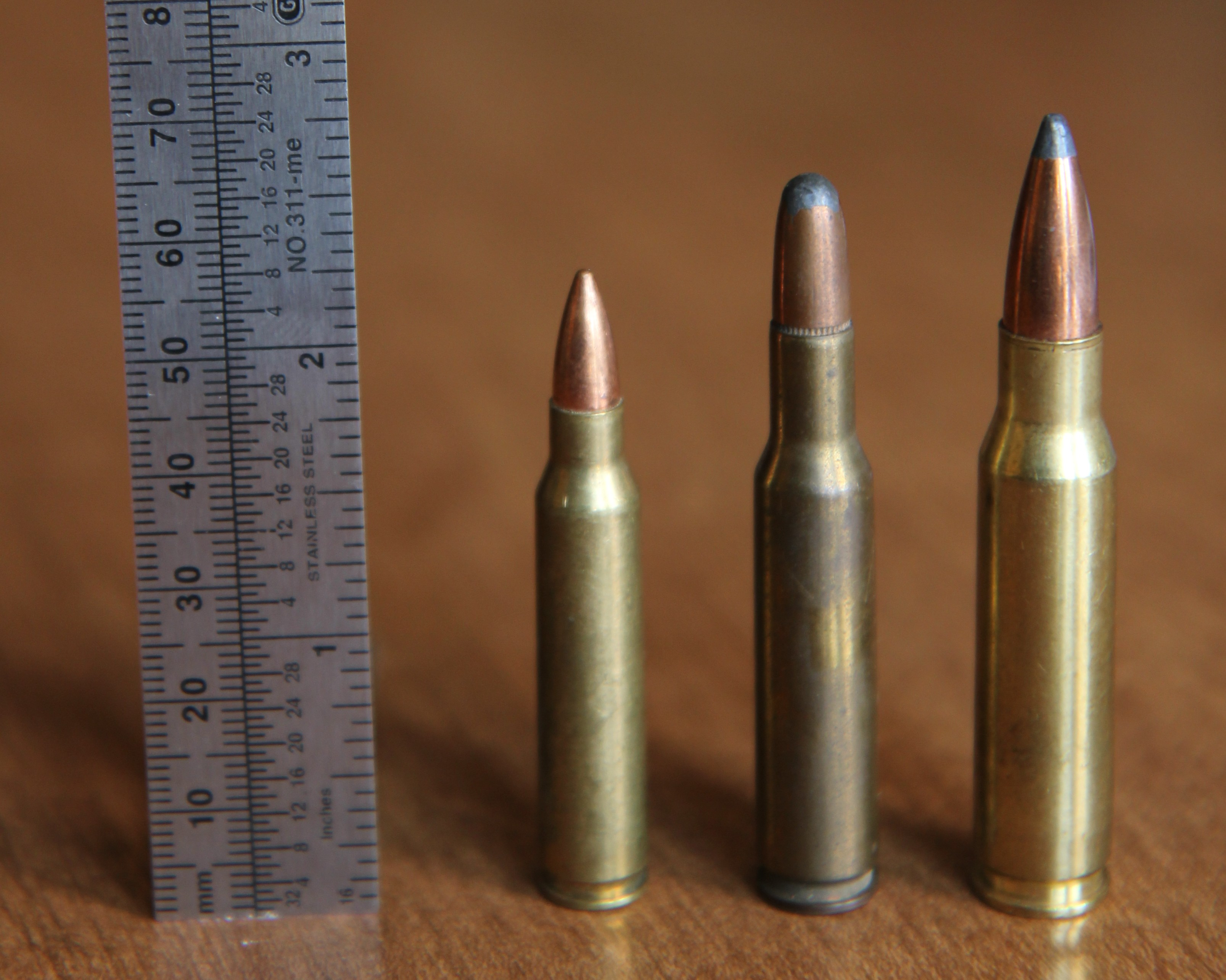
- (25 Remington) (center) with 223 Rem (left) and 308 Win (right).
- Type: Rifle
- Place of origin: United States

Production history
- Designer: Remington Arms

Specifications
- Case type: Rimless
- Bullet diameter: 0.2575 in (6.54 mm)
- Neck diameter: 0.286 in (7.3 mm)
- Shoulder diameter: 0.396 in (10.1 mm)
- Base diameter: 0.417 in (10.6 mm)
- Rim diameter: 0.419 in (10.6 mm)
- Case length: 2.05 in (52 mm)
- Overall length: 2.53 in (64 mm)
- Rifling twist: 1 turn in 8" or 1 turn in 10"
- Maximum pressure: 34000 to 36000 PSI

Ballistic performance
Bullet mass/type	Velocity	Energy
117 gr (8 g) RNSP	2,127 ft/s (648 m/s)	1,175 ft⋅lbf (1,593 J)
101 gr (7 g) FMJ	2,330 ft/s (710 m/s)	1,286 ft⋅lbf (1,744 J)
117 gr (8 g) Express Mushroom	2,350 ft/s (720 m/s)	1,435 ft⋅lbf (1,946 J)
87 gr (6 g) Express Mushroom	2,700 ft/s (820 m/s)	1,410 ft⋅lbf (1,910 J)
- Test barrel length: 22; Source(s): Whelen, Townsend. The American Rifle. The Century Co: 1918, p. 230-1.

The .25 Remington (also known as the .25 Remington Auto-Loading) is an American rifle cartridge. A rimless, smokeless powder design, this cartridge was considered to be very accurate by period firearm experts and suitable for game up to deer and black bear. It was based on the .30 Remington cartridge.

The .25 Remington cartridge dates to 1906 and its introduction by Remington in the Model 8 rifle. Other rifles chambered for the .25 Remington include the Remington 14 slide-action, Remington 30 bolt action, Stevens 425 lever-action, and Standard Arms rifles. Due to their similar dimensions, the .25 Remington, .30 Remington, and .32 Remington together were known as the Remington Rimless cartridge series. Firearm manufacturers generally offered all three of these cartridges as chamberings in a rifle model rather than just one of the series. The series was competitive with Winchester Repeating Arms Company's contemporary lever action offerings: .25-35 Winchester, .30-30, and .32 Winchester Special.

The .25 Remington case was shortened and necked down to .22 caliber to form Lysle Kilbourn's wildcat .22 Kilbourn Magnum Junior and the rimless version of Leslie Lindahl's wildcat .22 Chucker.

== See also ==
- List of cartridges by caliber
- List of rifle cartridges
- Remington Model 14
- 6 mm caliber
