= Net volatility =

Volatility implied by the price of an option spread trade involving two or more options

Net volatility refers to the volatility implied by the price of an option spread trade involving two or more options. Essentially, it is the volatility at which the theoretical value of the spread trade matches the price quoted in the market, or, in other words, the implied volatility of the spread.

== Formula ==
The net volatility for a two-legged spread (with one long leg, and one short) can be estimated, to a first order approximation, by the formula:

$$\sigma_N=\frac{\nu_L \sigma_L - \nu_S \sigma_S}{\nu_L - \nu_S}\,$$

where

$\sigma_N$ is the net volatility for the spread
$\sigma_L$ and $\nu_L$ are the implied volatility and vega for the long leg
$\sigma_S$ and $\nu_S$ are the implied volatility and vega for the short leg

== Example ==
It is now mid-April 2007, and you are considering going long a Sep07/May07 100 call spread, i.e. buy the Sep 100 call and sell the May 100 call. The Sep 100 call is offered at a 14.1% implied volatility and the May 100 call is bid at an 18.3% implied volatility. The vega of the Sep 100 call is 4.3 and the vega of the May 100 call is 2.3. Using the formula above, the net volatility of the spread is:

$$\frac{14.1\%\cdot4.3-18.3\%\cdot2.3}{4.3-2.3}=9.27\%$$

== Interpretation ==
In the example above, going short a May 100 call and long a Sep 100 call results in a synthetic forward option – i.e. an option struck at 100 that spans the period from May to September expirations. To see this, consider that the two options essentially offset each other from today until the expiration of the short May option.

Thus, the net volatility calculated above is, in fact, the implied volatility of this synthetic forward option. While it may seem counter-intuitive that one can create a synthetic option whose implied volatility is lower than the implied volatilities of its components, consider that the first implied volatility, 18.1%, corresponds to the period from today to May expiration, while the second implied volatility, 14.3% corresponds to the period from today to September expiration. Therefore, the implied volatility for the period May to September must be less than 14.3% to compensate for the higher implied volatility during the period to May.

In practice, one sees this type of situation often when the short leg is being bid up for a specific reason. For instance, the near option may include an upcoming event, such as an earnings announcement, that will, in all probability, cause the underlier price to move. After the event has passed, the market may expect the underlier to be relatively stable which results in a lower implied volatility for the subsequent period.

== See also ==
- Implied volatility
- Volatility arbitrage
- Option spread
- Volatility risk
