= Pedersen device =

Pedersen device, officially US Automatic Pistol, Caliber .30, Model of 1918
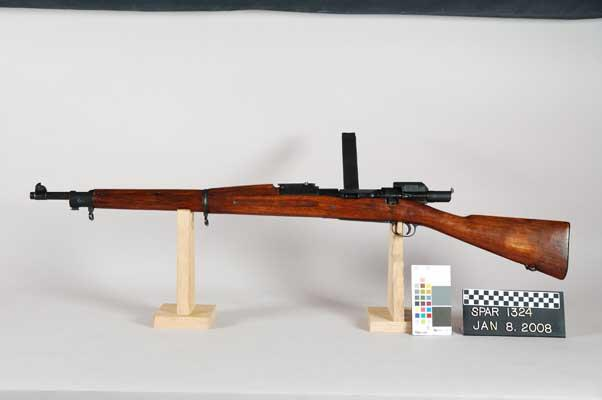
- Type: Semi-automatic rifle
- Place of origin: United States

Service history
- In service: 1918–1931
- Used by: United States Army

Production history
- Designer: John Pedersen
- Designed: 1917
- Manufacturer: Rock Island Arsenal (bolts); Mount Vernon Silversmiths (magazines)
- Produced: 1918–1920
- No. built: 65,000

Specifications
- Mass: 2 lb 2 oz (0.96 kg) empty 3 lb 2 oz (1.4 kg) loaded
- Length: 43.2 in (1,100 mm)
- Cartridge: .30-18 Auto (7.65×20mm Longue)
- Action: Simple blowback
- Feed system: 40-round box magazine
- Sights: Flip-up rear sight graduated to 2,700 yd (2,500 m), blade post-type front sight

The Pedersen device was an experimental weapon attachment for the M1903 Springfield bolt action rifle that allowed it to fire a .30 caliber (7.62 mm) pistol-type cartridge in semi-automatic fire mode. The attachment was developed to allow an infantryman to convert "their rifle to a form of submachine gun or automatic rifle" in approximately 15 seconds.

Production of the Pedersen device and modified M1903 rifles started in 1918. However, World War I ended before they could be fielded. The contract was cancelled on March 1, 1919, after production of 65,000 devices, 1.6 million magazines, 65 million cartridges, and 101,775 modified Springfield rifles.

The devices, magazines, ammunition and rifles were subsequently placed in storage, and declared surplus in 1931. When the United States Army decided they did not want to pay the cost of storing the devices, nearly all of the stored devices were destroyed except for a few examples kept by the Ordnance Department. Fewer than 100 Pedersen devices escaped ordered destruction to become extremely rare collector's items.

== History ==
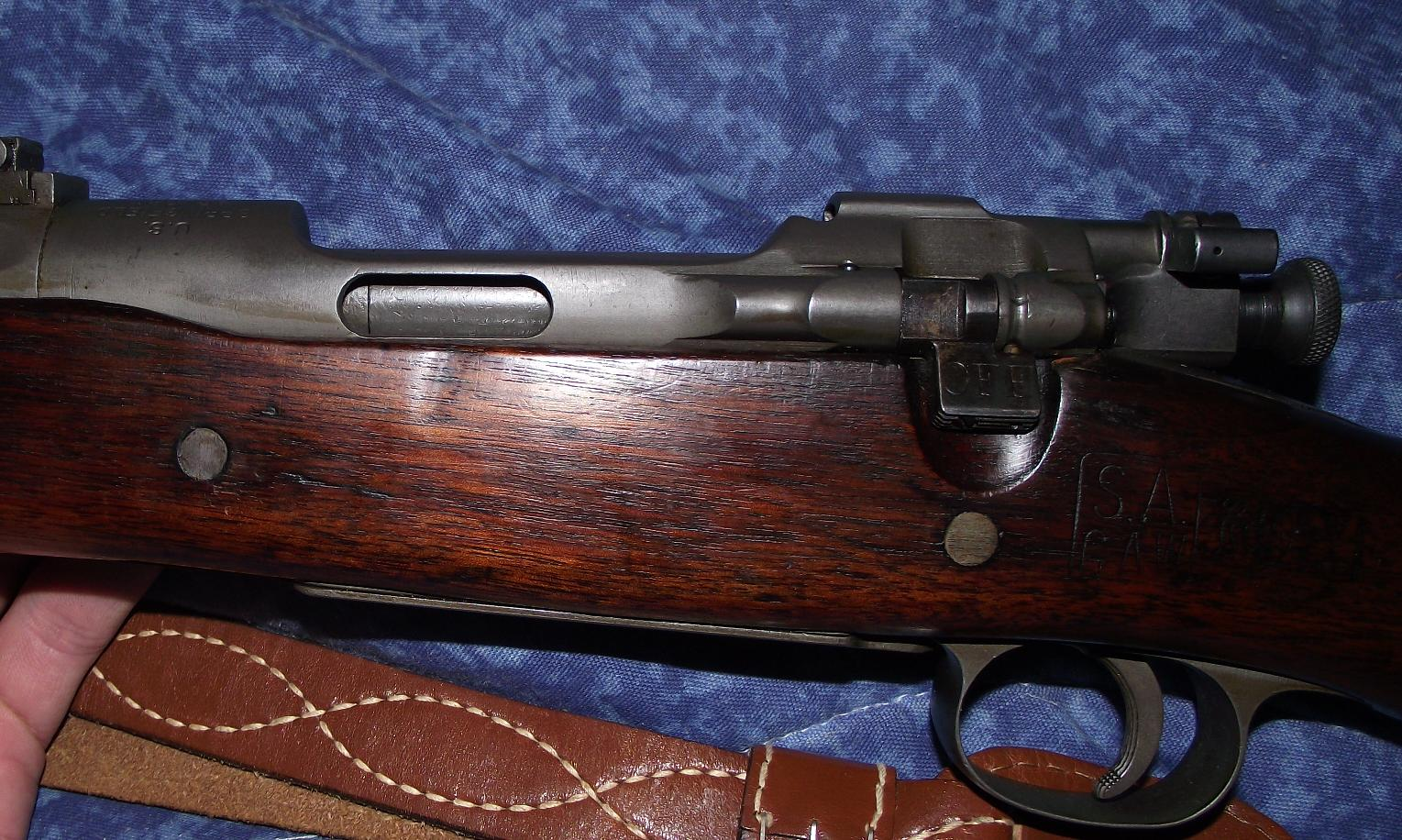
Modified M1903 Springfield with ejection port on the left side of the receiver to accommodate a Pedersen device

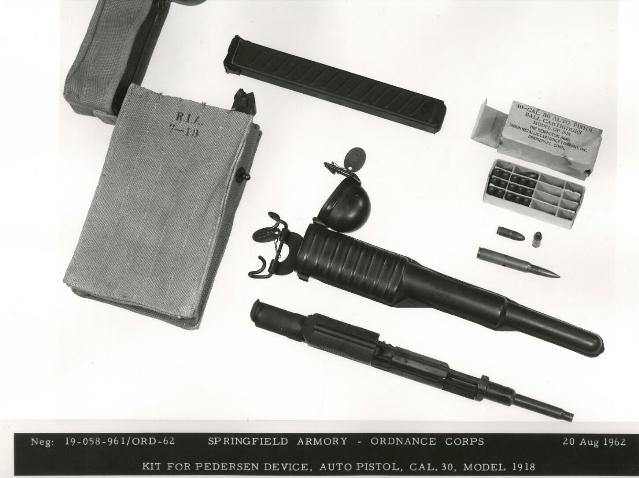
Kit for the Pedersen device, including bolt, scabbard, and magazine pouch

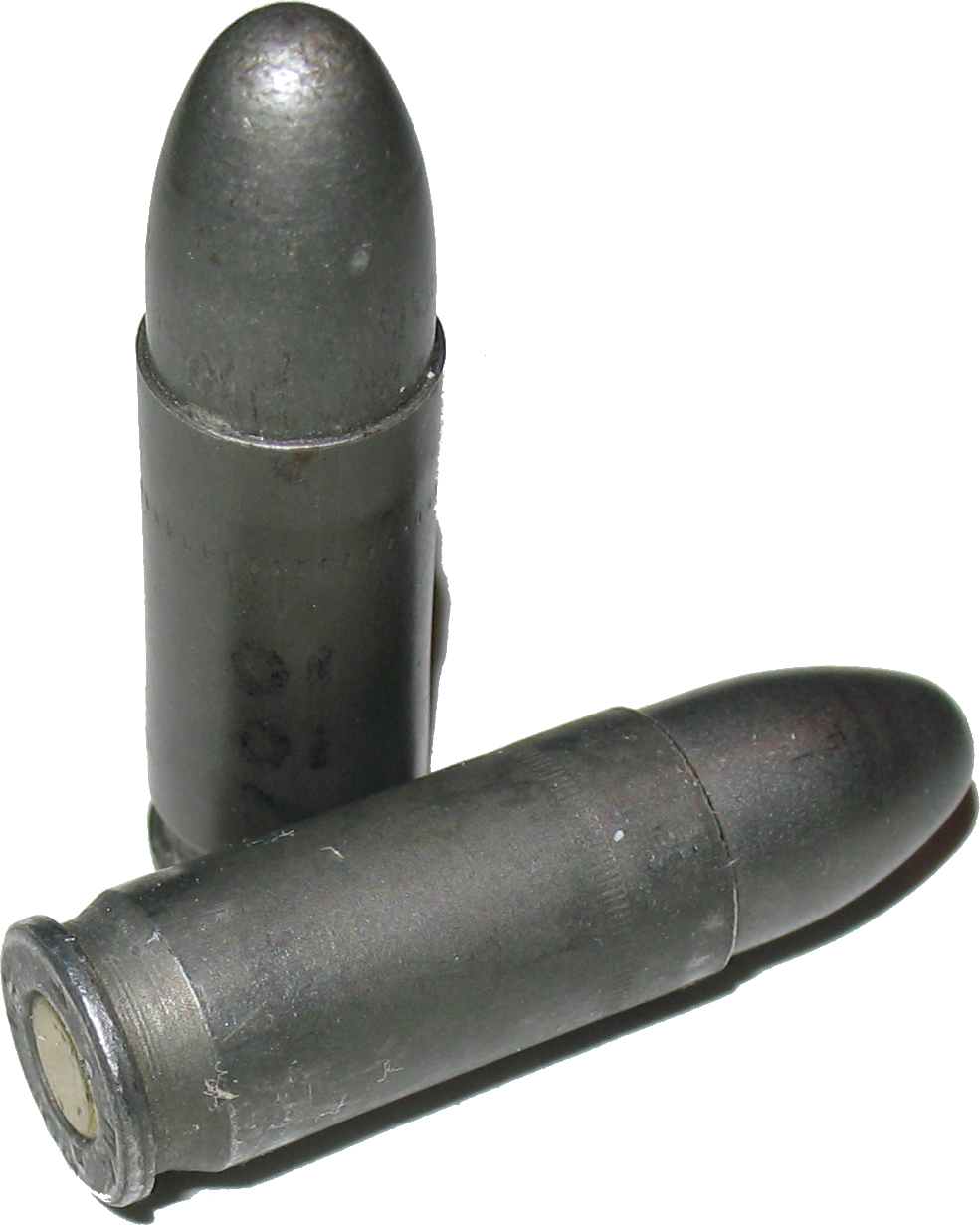
.30-18 Auto, also known as the 7.65mm Longue

Prior to the United States' entry into World War I, John Pedersen, a longtime employee of Remington Arms, developed the Pedersen device. His idea was to dramatically increase the firepower available to the average infantryman. His final design replaced the bolt of a modified Springfield M1903 rifle with a device consisting of a complete firing mechanism and a small "barrel" for a new .30 caliber pistol like cartridge.

In effect, the "device" was essentially a complete blowback pistol minus a receiver-grip using the short "barrel" of the device to fit into the longer chamber of the M1903 rifle. The mechanism was fed by a long 40-round magazine sticking perpendicularly out of the rifle at a 45-degree angle to the top right, and could be reloaded by inserting a new magazine. Each magazine had cut-out viewing slots facing aft so the rifleman could observe the number of unfired rounds remaining. The system required an ejection port to be cut into the left side of the M1903 rifle's receiver and the adjacent stock cut away to allow clearance for spent cartridges being thrown from the action. The sear, trigger, and magazine cut-off also required modifications which did not limit the ability of Mark I receivers to function in the normal bolt-action mode.

Pedersen traveled to Washington, D.C. on 8 October 1917 to conduct a secret demonstration for Chief of Ordnance General William Crozier and a selected group of army officers and congressmen. After firing several rounds from what appeared to be an unmodified Springfield, he removed the standard bolt, inserted the device, and fired several magazines at a very high rate of fire. The evaluation team was favorably impressed. To deceive the enemy, the Ordnance Department decided to call it the US Automatic Pistol, Caliber .30, Model of 1918. Plans were put into place to start production of modified Springfields, which became the US Rifle, Cal. .30, Model of M1903, Mark I. The Army placed orders for 133,450 devices and 800,000,000 cartridges for the 1919 Spring Offensive. General John J. Pershing requested 40 magazines and 5000 rounds of ammunition be shipped with each device and anticipated an average daily ammunition use of 100 rounds per device. The use of the Pedersen device in the 1919 spring offensive was to be in conjunction with the full combat introduction of the M1918 Browning Automatic Rifle (BAR.)

The US Patent Office issued U.S. patent 1,355,417, U.S. patent 1,355,418, U.S. patent 1,355,419, and U.S. patent 1,355,420 to Pedersen for his invention. The United States Army paid Pedersen $50,000 for rights to produce the device and a royalty of 50 cents for each device manufactured. The Army paid for all necessary machinery required to manufacture the device, and Remington received a net profit of two dollars for each device and 3 cents for each magazine.

A Mark II Pedersen Device was also designed for the M1917 "American Enfield" and a similar prototype was made for the Remington-produced Mosin–Nagant; neither of those were ever put into production.

== Production ==
Production of the device started in 1918, along with the modified rifle that December, after the war ended. The contract was cancelled on 1 March 1919 after production of 65,000 devices with 1.6 million magazines, 65 million cartridges and 101,775 modified Springfield rifles. Each device was to be issued with a belt including a stamped, sheet-steel scabbard for safely carrying the device when not in use, a canvas pouch to hold the M1903 rifle bolt when not in use, and canvas pouches holding five magazines. The device with two pouches of loaded magazines added 14 pounds to the infantryman's standard load.

Remington subcontracted magazine production to Mount Vernon Silversmiths, and the carrying scabbards were manufactured by Gorham Manufacturing Company. Canvas pouches for magazines and for the rifle bolt were manufactured at Rock Island Arsenal.

Ammunition was packaged in 40-round boxes sufficient to fill one magazine. Five boxes were packed in a carton corresponding to the five-magazine pouches, and three cartons were carried in a light canvas bandolier holding 600 cartridges. Five bandoliers were packed in a wooden crate. Ammunition produced by Remington is headstamped "RA" (or "RAH" for the Hoboken, New Jersey plant) with the years (19-) "18", "19", and "20".

== Post-war ==
After the war, the semi-automatic concept started to gain currency in the U.S. Army. By the late 1920s, the Army was experimenting with several new semi-automatic rifle designs, including the Pedersen rifle firing a new .276 (7 mm) rifle cartridge. However, the Pedersen rifle lost to a new semi-automatic rifle designed by John C. Garand. The Garand was originally developed for .30-06 cartridge and converted to the new .276 cartridge. After the .276 Garand rifle was selected over the Pedersen rifle, General Douglas MacArthur came out against changing rifle cartridges, since the Army had vast stockpiles of .30–06 ammunition left over from World War I, the .30-06 would have to be retained for machine gun use, and one cartridge simplified wartime logistics. Garand reverted his design back to the standard .30-06 Springfield cartridge in 1932; the result became the M1 Garand.

The Pedersen device was declared surplus in 1931, five years before the Garand had even started serial production. Mark I rifles were altered to M1903 standard in 1937 (except for, curiously, an ejection slot that remained in the receiver side wall) and were used alongside standard M1903 and M1903A1 Springfields. Nearly all of the stored devices were destroyed by the Army except for a few Ordnance Department examples, when it was decided they did not want to pay the cost of storing. They were burned in a large bonfire, though some were taken during the process. Following their destruction, noted writer Julian Hatcher wrote an authoritative article for the May 1932 issue of American Rifleman magazine describing the device in detail.

== See also ==
- 7.65mm Longue
- Remington Model 14
- Remington Model 51
