= Remington Model 8 =

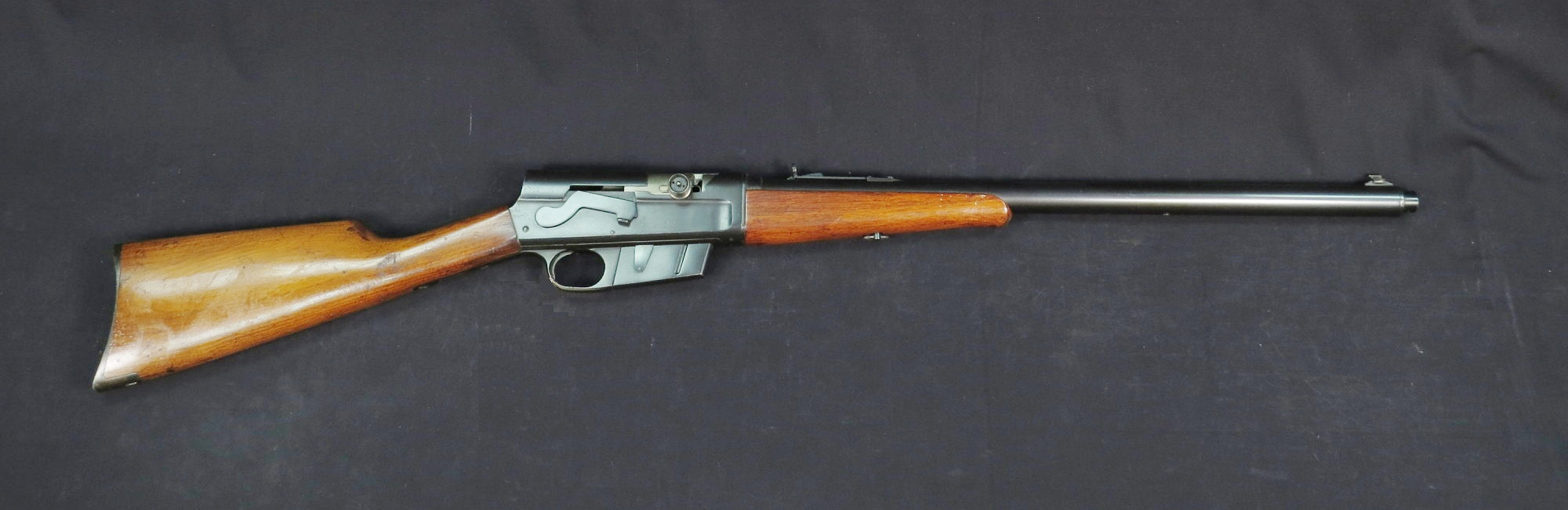
- Side view of a Remington Model 8
- Type: Semi-automatic rifle
- Place of origin: United States

Service history
- Used by: Federal Bureau of Investigation; Texas Rangers - same model .35 killing Bonnie and Clyde

Production history
- Designer: John Browning; C.C. Loomis
- Manufacturer: Remington Arms
- Produced: 1905–1911 (Remington Autoloading Rifle) 1910–1929 (FN Model 1900); 1911–1936 (Model 8) 1936–1950 (Model 81)
- No. built: 26,000 (Remington Autoloading Rifle); 4,913 (FN Model 1900); 80,600 (Model 8); 55,581 (Model 81)

Specifications
- Mass: 8 lb (3.6 kg)
- Length: 41.1 in (104 cm)
- Barrel length: 22 in (56 cm)
- Cartridge: .25 Remington.30 Remington.32 Remington.35 Remington.300 Savage
- Action: Recoil-operated
- Feed system: Fixed 5 round box magazine,(5-,10-,15-round box magazine)

The Remington Model 8 is a semi-automatic rifle designed by John Browning and produced by Remington Arms, introduced as the Remington Autoloading Rifle in 1905, though the name was changed to the Remington Model 8 in 1911.

== History ==
On October 16, 1900, John Browning was granted U.S. patent 659,786 for the rifle, which he then sold to Remington. Outside the U.S., this rifle was made by Fabrique Nationale of Liege, Belgium, and marketed as the FN Browning 1900.

Under an agreement between Remington and FN, the Model 8 would be sold in the US while the FN 1900 were sold primarily in Canada and Western Europe. Only 4,913 Model 1900s were ever produced compared to the over 80,000 Model 8s produced.

== Design and features ==
The Remington Model 8 rifle was the first commercially successful semiautomatic rifle offered for civilian sale in the United States.

It is long recoil-operated and uses a rotating bolt head. After firing, the barrel and bolt, still locked together, move rearward inside the receiver and compress two recoil springs. Then the bolt is held back while the barrel is returned forward by one of the springs permitting extraction and ejection. Once the barrel is returned, the bolt is returned forward by the second spring; in so doing it picks up a fresh cartridge from the magazine and chambers it. The Remington Model 8 has a fixed 5-shot magazine and bolt hold-open device which engages after the magazine is empty. It is a take-down design, meaning that the barrel and receiver are easily separated with no tools, allowing for a smaller package for transport.

Remington created four new calibers for the Model 8 rifle: .25 Remington, .30 Remington, .32 Remington and .35 Remington. These cartridges were rimless designs to allow reliable feeding from box magazines. The Model 8 was offered in five grades of finish (Standard, Special, Peerless, Expert and Premier) and was the first truly reliable high power semiautomatic rifle ever commercialized (1906).

== Use ==
The primary market for the Model 8 was sport hunting. The Model 8 was used as a police gun, modified to use detachable extended capacity magazines, among other changes. It saw limited use in World War I, 100 FN Model 1900s were being used by the French Aéronautique Militaire until about 1916, a further Acquisition of 400 Model 8s was discussed however this doesn't seem to have happened. It is noted as the rifle of choice by famed Texas Ranger Frank Hamer. Hamer's rifle was a customized .35 Remington Model 8 with a special-order 15-round magazine from Petmeckey's Sporting Goods store in Austin, Texas. He was shipped serial number 10045, and this was just one of at least two Model 8s used in the ambush of Clyde Barrow and Bonnie Parker. The rifle was modified to accept a "police only" 20-round magazine obtained through the Peace Officers Equipment Company in St. Joseph, Missouri.

== Variants ==
=== Model 81 Woodsmaster ===
In 1936, Remington dropped the Model 8 and introduced the Model 81 Woodsmaster with improvements by C.C. Loomis. The Model 81 was offered in .300 Savage and the .25 Remington chambering was dropped after a limited number of 81s were chambered in this round. It was additionally offered in Standard (81A), Special (81B), Peerless (81D), Expert (81E) and Premier (81F) grades. The Federal Bureau of Investigation acquired some Model 81 rifles chambered for .30 Remington and .35 Remington in response to the 1933 Kansas City Massacre. Production of the Model 81 ceased in 1950.
