= .35 Remington =

Firearm cartridge from the Remington's lineup

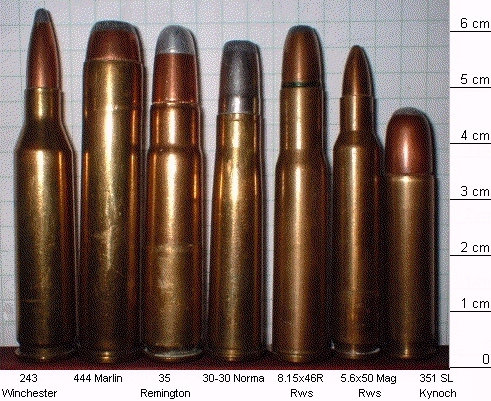
- Type: Rifle
- Place of origin: United States

Production history
- Designer: Remington
- Designed: 1906
- Manufacturer: Remington
- Produced: 1906–present

Specifications
- Case type: Rimless, bottleneck
- Bullet diameter: .358 in (9.1 mm)
- Neck diameter: .384 in (9.8 mm)
- Shoulder diameter: .405 in (10.3 mm)
- Base diameter: .458 in (11.6 mm)
- Rim diameter: .460 in (11.7 mm)
- Case length: 1.920 in (48.8 mm)
- Overall length: 2.525 in (64.1 mm)
- Primer type: Large rifle
- Maximum pressure (CIP): 39,900 psi (275 MPa)
- Maximum pressure (SAAMI): 33,500 psi (231 MPa)
- Maximum CUP: 33,500 CUP

Ballistic performance
Bullet mass/type	Velocity	Energy
200 gr (13 g) Lead FN	2,084 ft/s (635 m/s)	1,929 ft⋅lbf (2,615 J)
180 gr (12 g) FN	2,122 ft/s (647 m/s)	1,800 ft⋅lbf (2,400 J)
200 gr (13 g) RN	2,071 ft/s (631 m/s)	1,905 ft⋅lbf (2,583 J)
200 gr (13 g) FTX (Hornady Flex Tip Expanding)	2,225 ft/s (678 m/s)	2,198 ft⋅lbf (2,980 J)
- Test barrel length: 24; Source: Accurate Powder

The .35 Remington (9.1×49 mm) is the only cartridge from Remington's lineup of medium-power rimless cartridges still in commercial production. Introduced in 1906, it was originally chambered for the Remington Model 8 semi-automatic rifle in 1908.

It is also known as 9 x 49 mm Browning, 9 x 48 mm Browning, and 9 mm Don Gonzalo.

== History ==
Over the years, the .35 Remington has been chambered in a variety of rifles by most firearms manufacturers, and continues in popularity today in the Marlin Model 336 lever-action and Henry Side Gate Lever Action. It is also a popular cartridge for single-shot hunting pistols like the Thompson/Center Contender and the Remington XP-100. For hunters looking for a medium-power rifle with moderate recoil, for short to medium ranges, the .35 Remington is popular alongside the .30-30 Winchester. It has a small but loyal following in the northeast and areas of the southern United States.

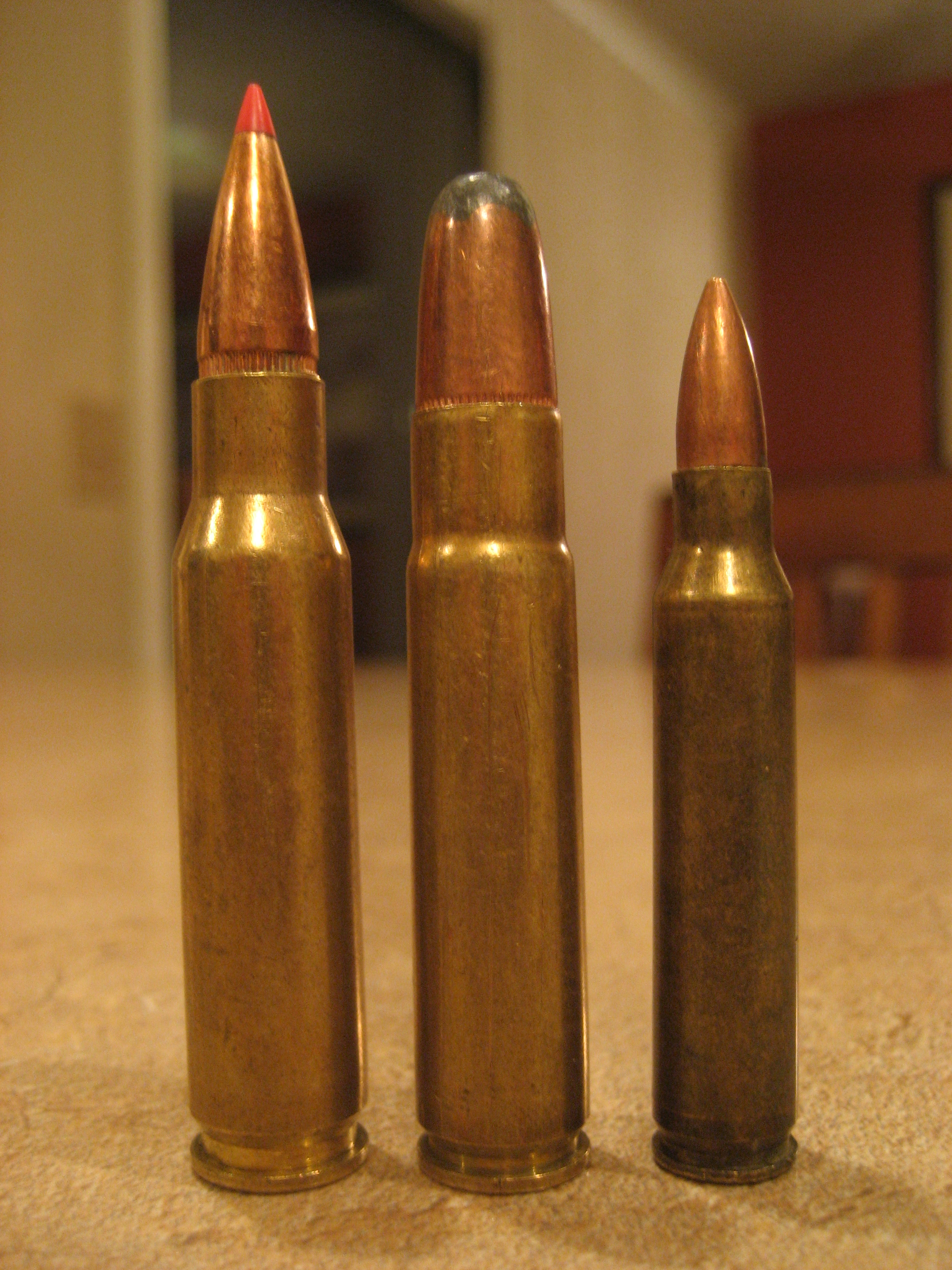
(Left to right) .308 Winchester, .35 Remington Soft Point, and .223 Remington.

The cartridge uses a medium to heavy bullet and has moderate recoil based on a moderate pressure level of 33,500 CUP as set by SAAMI. The normal factory load consists of a 200 grain round-nosed bullet with a muzzle velocity of 2080 feet per second. This 200 grain bullet is nearly 18% heavier than the .30-30's 170 grain bullet, and has a 16% larger frontal area. This gives it a substantial increase in power over the .30-30, especially when used on larger game species.

Remington helped promote the advantage in power that the .35 Remington had over the .30-30 through a series of advertising campaigns in the early 1900s. One of their advertisements even publicized the ability of the .35 Remington to penetrate a 5/16-inch (7.9 mm) steel plate, which the .30-30 Winchester could not do.

The .35 Remington is considered a fine round for deer, elk, black bear, and other medium and large game as long as ranges are reasonable. Hornady currently produces a .35 Remington load in their LEVERevolution line that features a rubber-tipped spitzer bullet which is safe to use in lever-action or pump-action firearms with tubular magazines.

== Dimensions ==
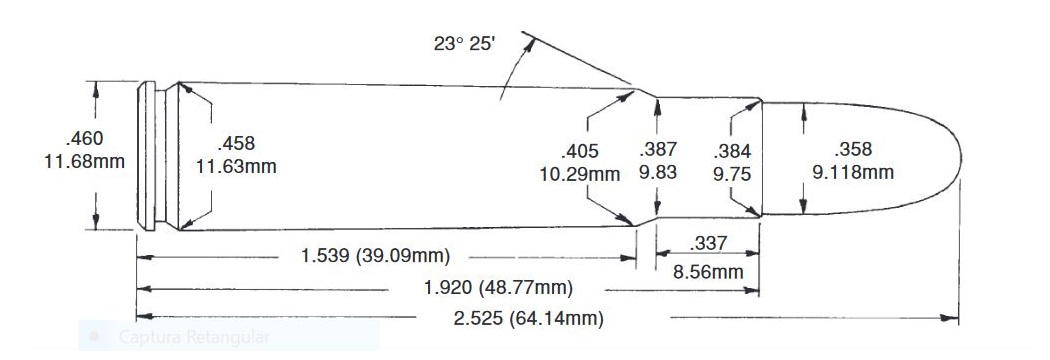

== See also ==
- .30-30 Winchester
- .360 Buckhammer
- 9 mm caliber
- List of rifle cartridges
- Table of handgun and rifle cartridges
