= Remington Model Four =

Model Four
- Type: Rifle
- Place of origin: United States

Production history
- Manufacturer: Remington Arms
- Produced: 1981–1988
- Variants: Model Four Collectors Edition

Specifications
- Mass: 7.5 lb (3.4 kg)
- Length: 42 in (110 cm)
- Barrel length: 22 in (56 cm)
- Cartridge: .243 Winchester; 6mm Remington.270 Winchester.280 Remington.30-06 Springfield.308 Winchester
- Action: Semi-auto, gas-operated
- Feed system: 4-round box mag
- Sights: Ramped front, adjustable rear

The Remington Model Four is a semi-automatic rifle manufactured by Remington Arms from 1981 to 1987. It features a gas-operated action with a gloss-finished walnut stock. Unlike most Remington rifles, the Model Four spells out the number and is marketed as the Model Four not the Model 4.

The Model Four, like the Model 7400, is similar to the Model 742; according to an article in Popular Mechanics, the Model Four has a "smoother action and stronger lockup".

== Variants ==
Model Four Collectors Edition
1500 Collectors Editions were made by the company in 1982. They used the .30-06 cartidges and has an etched receiver, 24K gold inlays, and a shiny finish.
