= Remington Model 700 =

Remington 700
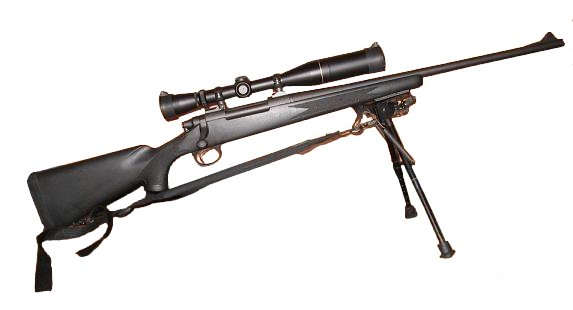
- Remington Model 700 ADL with Leupold scope and Harris bipod
- Type: Bolt action rifle
- Place of origin: United States

Service history
- Used by: See Users
- Wars: Lebanese Civil War; Nicaraguan Revolution

Production history
- Designer: Mike Walker
- Manufacturer: Remington Arms
- Produced: 1962–present
- No. built: over 5 million

Specifications
- Mass: 8.99 lb (4.08 kg)
- Length: 41.5 in (1,050 mm)
- Barrel length: 16.5 to 26 in (420 to 660 mm)
- Cartridge: 6mm Remington; 6.5mm Creedmoor; 6.5×47mm Lapua; 7mm-08 Remington; 7mm Remington Magnum; 7mm Shooting Times Westerner; 8mm Remington Magnum; 8.6mm Blackout; .17 Remington Fireball; .220 Swift; .221 Remington Fireball; .222 Remington; .223 Remington; .22-250 Remington; .243 Winchester; .25-06 Remington; .257 Roberts; .257 Weatherby Magnum; .260 Remington; .270 Winchester; .280 Remington; .30-06 Springfield; .300 Remington Ultra Magnum; .300 Weatherby Magnum; .300 Winchester Magnum; .300 Winchester Short Magnum; .308 Winchester; .338 Lapua Magnum; .416 Remington Magnum; .458 Winchester Magnum
- Action: Bolt action, rotating bolt with 2 lugs
- Feed system: 3- to 6-round internal magazine or a detachable 10-round magazine
- Sights: Scope, Rail interface system

The Remington Model 700 is part of a series of bolt-action (later semi-automatic 7400 series) centerfire rifles manufactured by Remington Arms since 1962. It is a progressive variant of the Remington Model 721 and Model 722 rifles series, which was introduced in 1948. The M24 and M40 military sniper rifles, which are both based on the Model 700 design, are in use by the United States Army and United States Marine Corps, respectively.

The Remington 700 series rifles feature a 3, 4, or 5-round internal magazine depending on the caliber. Some models include a hinged floor plate for quick unloading and can also be configured with a detachable box magazine. The Model 700 is available in many different stock, barrel, and caliber combinations, with many third-party and aftermarket variants built on the same action footprint. From 1984 to 1988, Remington offered the Sportsman 78, which had the same Model 700 ADL action but with lower-cost features, such as a plain, non-knurled bolt knob and hardwood stock instead of walnut.

== Development ==
After World War II, Remington Arms engineer Merle "Mike" Walker designed lower-cost alternatives to the Model 30, resulting in the Model 721. These used a cylindrical receiver produced from cylindrical bar stock that could be turned on a lathe rather than machined in a series of milling operations which significantly reduced production costs. Additionally, small metal parts, such as the bottom metal, were stamped, and the stocks were finished to a lower standard than previous models. The Model 721 saw further development under the direction of Walker, which resulted in the Model 722, 725 and ultimately the Model 700 in 1962.

Walker sought to increase the rifles' accuracy by utilizing tight tolerances in the chamber and bore, a short leade, and a much faster lock time. Like the earlier Model 721, the Model 700 was designed for mass production. Remington initially produced two variants of the Model 700, the ADL and BDL, in both long-action and short-action rifles that allowed for the chambering of different cartridges.

In 1969, Remington introduced several upgrades to the rifle, including a more extended rear bolt shroud, a jeweled bolt, and improved stock finishing. Four years later, the production of left-handed versions of the rifle began to compete with the Savage Model 110, the only primary rifle manufactured with a left-handed variant. Since then, various versions of the gun have been introduced, including the titanium receiver 700 Ti, the 700 SPS (which replaced the ADL in 2005), and the CDL. In addition to it being catered as a hunting rifle, the Model 700 also provided the basis for military and police sniper rifles, starting with the M40 rifle in 1966, which the U.S. Marine Corps initially ordered. The U.S. Army adopted the M24 Sniper Weapon System in 1986.

=== Design ===
The Remington 700 is a manually operated bolt-action rifle with two forward dual-opposed lugs. The bolt face is recessed, fully enclosing the base of the cartridge. The extractor is a C-clip sitting within the bolt face. The ejector is a plunger on the bolt face actuated by a coil spring. The bolt is of three-piece construction (head, body, and bolt handle), brazed together. The receiver is milled from round cross-section steel.

The Remington 700 is available in numerous variants.

- The symmetrical two-lug bolt body has a .695 in (17.65 mm) diameter.
- The long-action — designed for full-length cartridges up to 3.340 inches (84.84 mm) in overall length, such as the .30-06 Springfield, and magnum cartridges, such as the 7mm Remington Magnum and .300 Winchester Magnum — has a lock time of 3.0 to 3.2 milliseconds.
- The short-action designed for cartridges having an overall length of 2.750 inches (69.85 mm) or less, such as the .308 Winchester/7.62×51mm NATO, has a lock time of 2.6 milliseconds.

The rifles are designed to accept different magazine configurations — a blind magazine without a floor-plate, a conventional magazine with a detachable floor-plate, and a detachable box magazine. There are standard consumer versions as well as versions designed for military and police use. Some variants also have bipods, slings and other accessories.

=== Standard versions ===
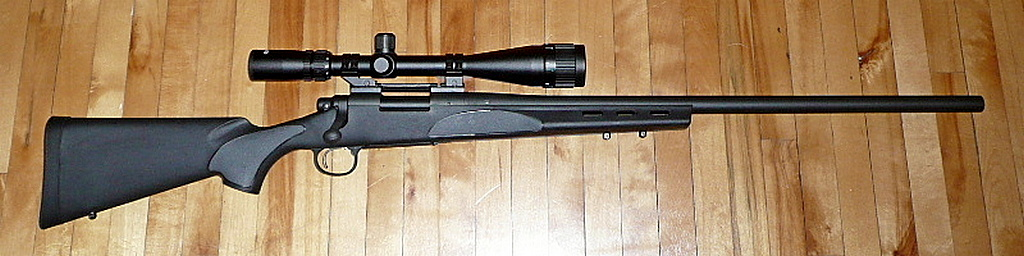
Remington 700 SPS Varmint with Tasco scope

Remington produces the Mountain LSS model with a stainless steel barrel and laminated stock. Heavy barrel versions with laminated stocks like the Model 700 SPS Varmint are available for varmint hunting. The Model 700 ADL was replaced as the most economical Model 700 by the Model 700 SPS (Special Purpose Synthetic) in newer production.

Remington also produced a 700 ML (muzzleloader) rifle from 1996-2004.

The EtronX electronic primer ignition system was implemented in the Model 700 EtronX introduced in 2000, though this model was a commercial failure and ceased production in 2003 along with the EtronX primers.

=== Police version ===
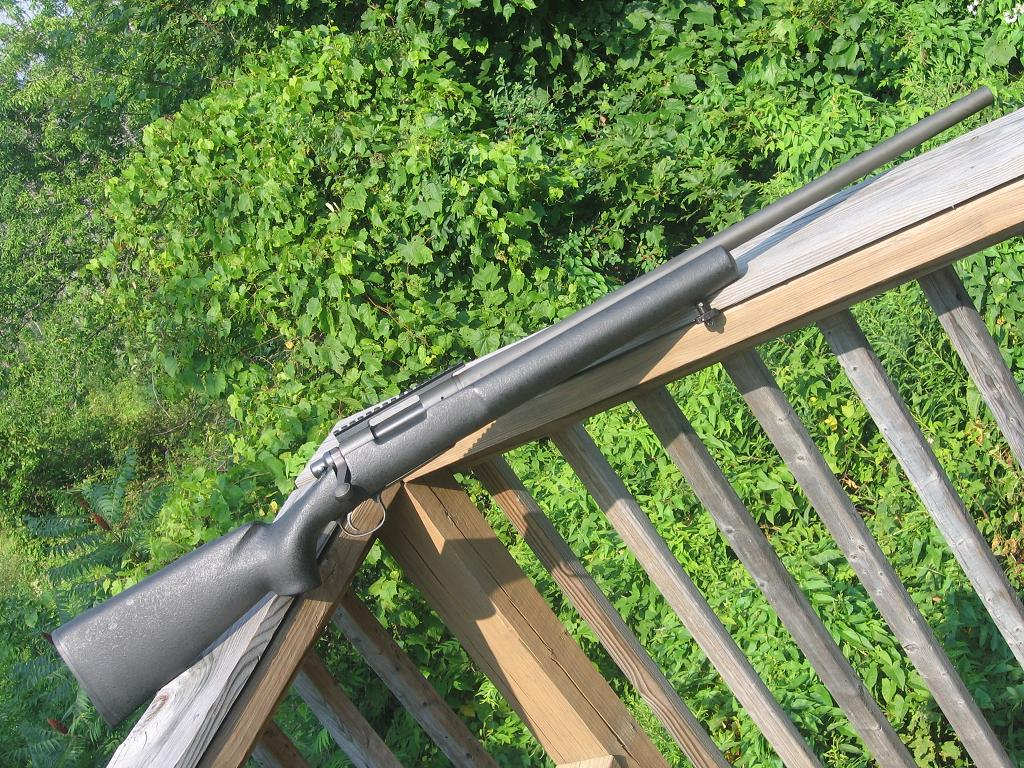
Remington Model 700P

Remington markets the 700 to military forces and civilian law-enforcement agencies under the "Remington Law Enforcement" and "Remington Military" banners, with the military/law enforcement 700s referred to as the Model 700P ("Police").

The 700P series was influenced by the designs, features and success of the M24 Sniper Weapon System and the M40 series; for instance, the Model 700P series features a heavier and thicker barrel for increased accuracy and reduced recoil.

The rifle is chambered for the .308 Winchester cartridge as well as the .223 Remington, .243 Winchester, 7mm Remington Magnum, .300 Winchester Magnum, .300 Remington Ultra Magnum and .338 Lapua Magnum. The 700P has a 26" barrel and aluminum block bedding in its stock made by HS Precision.

Remington also sells the standard U.S. Army-issue Leupold Mark IV M3 10x40mm telescopic sight used by the Army's M24 as an optional feature.

Remington offers similarly styled, less expensive versions under the Special Purpose Synthetic (SPS) name.

=== Military version ===
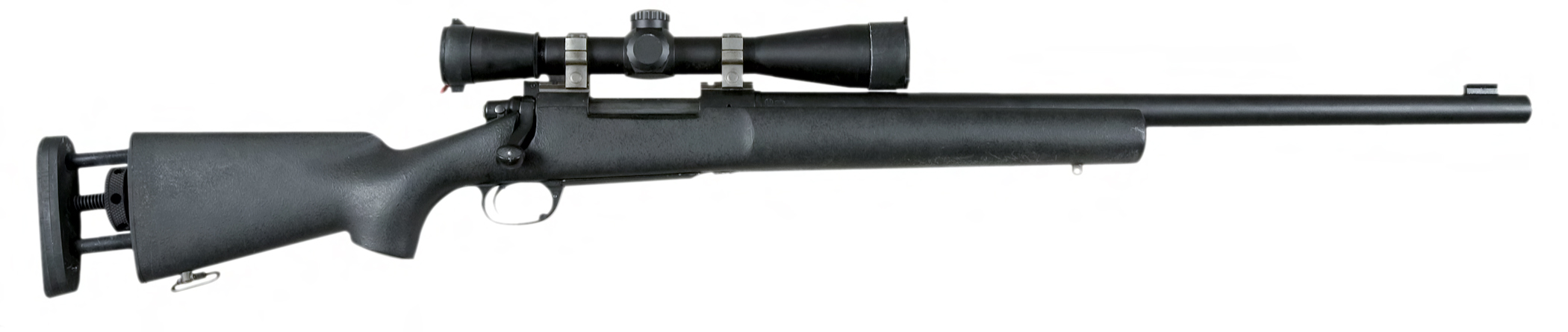
M24 SWS (right view)

Both the U.S. Army's M24 Sniper Weapon System and U.S. Marine Corps' M40 sniper rifles are built from the Remington Model 700 rifle with different degrees of modification, the main difference being the custom fitted heavy contour barrel and action length. The M24 utilizes the long-action and the M40 employs the short-action bolt-face, as the M24 was originally intended to chamber the longer .300 Winchester Magnum round. The M40, however, was not intended to chamber the more powerful .300 Winchester Magnum round, yet the Marine Corps' intention was to migrate to that cartridge. The Marine Corps' delay led to a change in the migratory direction. The goal was for the M40 to become a rifle chambered in .338 Lapua Magnum.

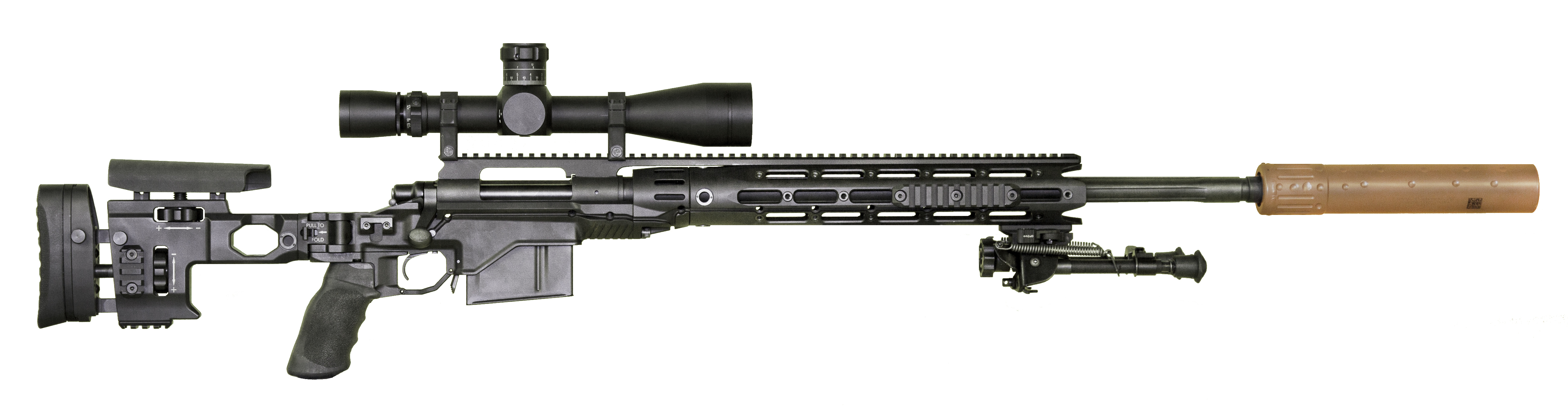
The U.S. Army M2010 rifle (right view)

The United States Army's Joint Munitions and Lethality Contracting Center awarded Remington a Firm Fixed Price (FFP) Indefinite Delivery/ Indefinite Quantity (IDIQ) contract (W15QKN-10-R-0403) for the upgrade of up to 3,600 M24 Sniper Weapon Systems (SWS) fielded to the Army, pending type classification as the “M24E1”. The major configuration change for this system was the caliber conversion from 7.62mm NATO (.308 Winchester) to .300 Winchester Magnum to provide soldiers with additional precision engagement capability and range. The contract was for a five-year period with a guaranteed minimum value of $192K and a potential value of up to $28.2 million. This award followed a full and open competitive evaluation lasting nine months, which began with the release of the Army's Request for Proposal (RFP) on January 13, 2010. The program was executed under the authority of Project Manager Soldier Weapons, Picatinny Arsenal, New Jersey, and managed by its subordinate unit, Product Manager Individual Weapons.

In 2009, the U.S. Army changed the weapon name from M24E1 to XM2010 Enhanced Sniper Rifle.

=== Model Seven version ===
The Remington Model Seven carbine is a compact version of the Remington 700 built around a short-action and chambered in the .223 Rem and .308 Win class cartridges. Introduced in 1983, the stock is shorter than the standard version with the barrel being only 18.5".

== Users ==
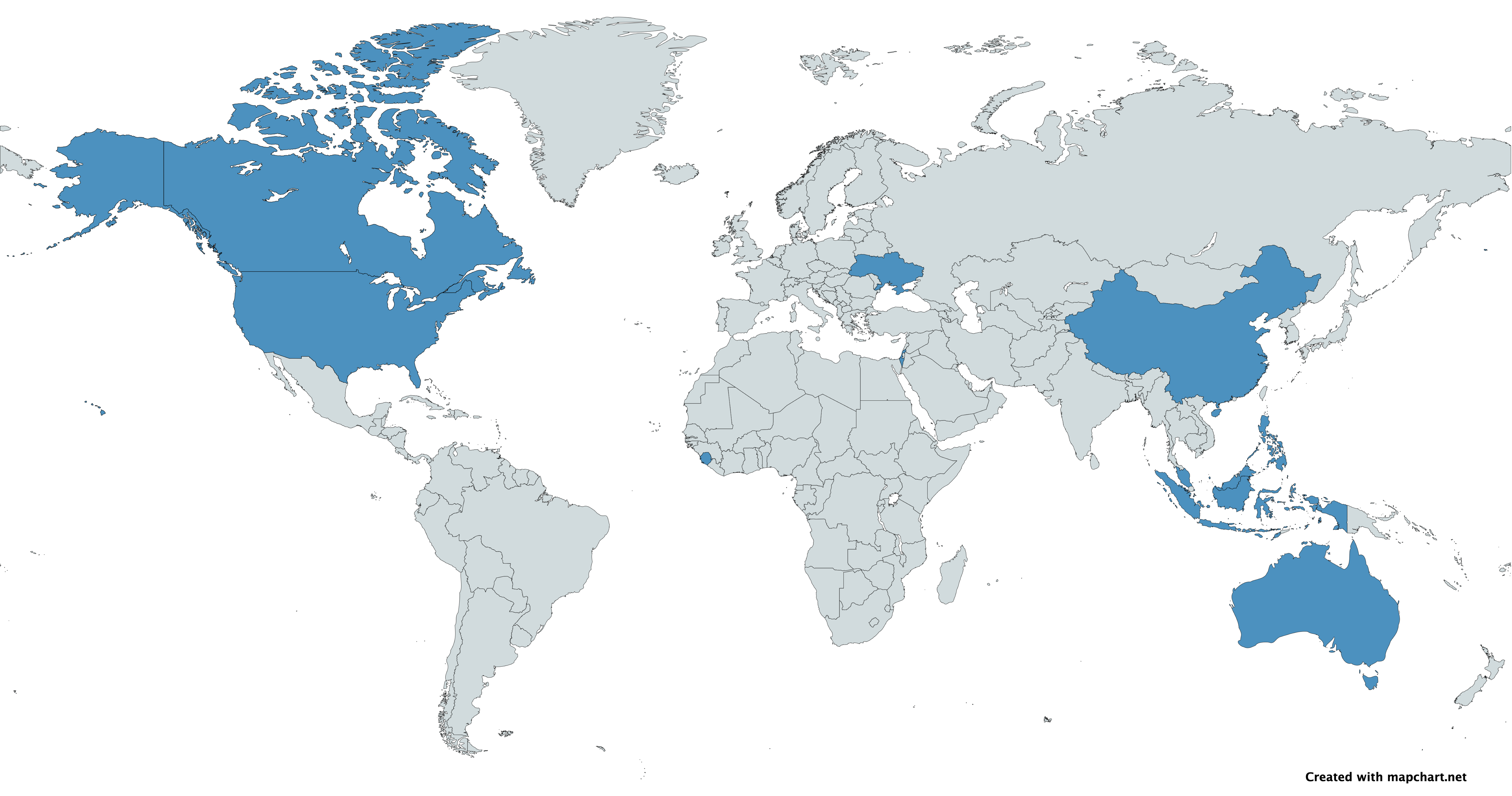
Map with Remington Model 700 users in blue

- Australia: New South Wales Police Force State Protection Group
- Canada: Royal Canadian Mounted Police (RCMP).
- China: Remington 700 PSS used by People's Armed Police
- Indonesia: Komando Pasukan Katak (Kopaska) tactical diver group and Komando Pasukan Khusus (Kopassus) special forces group.
- Israel: Israel Police and Israel Defense Forces special forces, replaced by Mauser 86 SR and M24 SWS
- Malaysia: Pasukan Gerakan Khas (PGK).
- Philippines: Philippine Marine Corps (PMC).
- Sierra Leone: Sierra Leone Police
- Ukraine: Ukrainian Army
- United States: United States Border Patrol, United States Marine Corps, United States Navy, United States Army, Cambridge Police Department (Massachusetts).

== Controversy ==
Thousands of Remington Model 700 customers have complained to Remington that a defect in the trigger mechanism could cause the gun to be fired without the trigger being squeezed. Remington received nearly 2,000 complaints from 2013 through 2016 and 150 lawsuits had been filed against Remington alleging injury or death related to the trigger. Lawsuits have alleged that Remington covered up a design flaw in the trigger mechanism, resulting in dozens of deaths and hundreds of serious injuries. A class-action lawsuit alleges Remington knowingly sold a defective product. The Attorneys general from nine states and the District of Columbia objected to the proposed settlement in the class action, saying that Remington has "long known" of the defect and that the proposed settlement "fails to adequately protect public safety."

On October 20, 2010, CNBC televised the first in an ongoing investigative series, Remington Under Fire: a CNBC Investigation, reporting that the trigger mechanism used prior to 2007 on the Model 700 could fire without the trigger being squeezed. The report stated that Remington has received thousands of customer complaints since the firing mechanism was introduced in the 1940s and that nearly two dozen deaths and hundreds of injuries had been attributed to inadvertent discharges of 700 series rifles. Through internal Remington documents, the program showed that on multiple occasions the company considered recalling the product.

The inventor of the firing mechanism, Mike Walker, 98 years old at the time of the documentary, told CNBC he proposed what he called a "safer trigger" back in 1948 while the product was still in the testing stage. Walker said his enhanced design was rejected because of the added cost, 5.5 cents per gun (adjusted for inflation: $0.74). Critics of the documentary countered that every incident featured on the program involving loss of life was the result of firearms mishandling, where owners pointed their rifles at other human beings. Remington responded with the Remington Model 700 Network, which gave direct rebuttals to the program, and their perspective on the incidents the program described. Remington dismisses the allegations, pointing out that in every case either trigger mechanisms of the rifles were adjusted or altered beyond recommended specifications, with rifles being poorly maintained and left to rust, or due to the misuse of the rifles. Those involved admitted to police they might have "possibly" pulled the trigger.

Though Remington has since changed to a new, cheaper, trigger mechanism design, the original Walker trigger is still produced for the U.S. military and buyers of custom rifles.

On December 6, 2014, Remington announced that as a part of actions put into place to settle multiple lawsuits and to avoid future legal actions, they are replacing all triggers in the Model 700s. Approximately 7.85 million rifles were included in this agreement, making all of them eligible for replacements.

On February 19, 2017, CBS News' 60 Minutes aired a segment on the Remington 700 trigger mechanism safety. The episode highlighted incidents of accidental deaths as a result of Remington 700s firing without the trigger being initiated, problems with Remington's trigger mechanism replacement program, and a class-action lawsuit filed by Remington owners.

On October 23, 2018, the wrongful death class-action lawsuit originally filed in 2000 was settled for an undisclosed amount, however part of the settlement involved Remington agreeing to replace the trigger assembly on even more rifle models than previous recalls covered, the new agreement covers over 7.5 million rifles equipped with the X-Mark Pro trigger; besides the Model 700 the replacement agreement also includes replacements for the model Seven, Sportsman 78, 673, 710, 715, 770, 600, 660, 721, 722, 725, and the XP-100 bolt action pistol. Owners of qualifying models had 18 months to file for a free trigger replacement. Earlier that year Remington filed for Chapter 11 Bankruptcy due the large amount of settlements from lawsuits, but by May of 2018 had been bailed out by their creditors, who took control of the company and by 2020 the company had shredded over $775 million in debt. This was done by selling off various Remington assets, including selling the rights to the Marlin Firearms brand name, which was purchased by Ruger for $28.3 million. After Remington was bought out by its creditors in May 2018, one (or more) of them anonymously sent over 80,000 pages of documents dating back more than five decades to the law firm and original plaintiff in the lawsuit, the documents revealed that Remington had known about the faulty trigger assembly as far back as the 1960's, and had settled its first lawsuit out-of-court regarding the issue over 50 years ago. The documents showed that Remington actively covered up this fact, and settled dozens of lawsuits quietly out-of-court, getting the records sealed.

In April 2020 CNBC News published a story featuring updates about the trigger replacements, and also reports on their investigation regarding claims of faulty replacement triggers. The deadline for the free trigger replacement was April 23, 2020, but the COVID-19 shutdown created complications for Remington's offer to replace the triggers as the shutdown had caused many gunsmiths and repair shops nation wide to close. About a dozen people who had their rifle's triggers replaced claimed that they continued to experience malfunctions of the gun firing when the bolt was closed, or the safety being disengaged, without the trigger being pulled. Remington examined several of the rifles alleged to have malfunctioned after they were repaired. They confirmed that the guns had not been altered by the customers, but were unable to duplicate the reported malfunctions. The lead attorney for the plaintiffs stated he had not personally received any complaints of malfunctioning rifles after they were repaired.
