= Remington Model 760 =

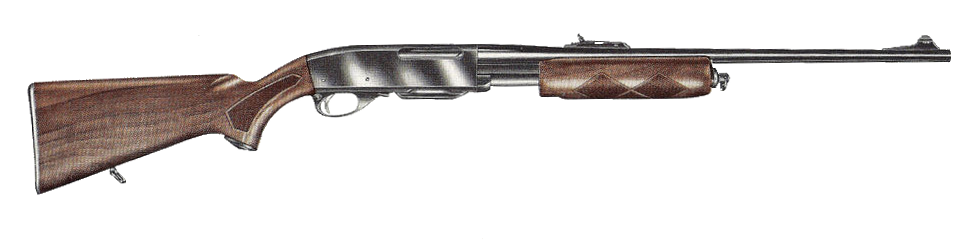
- Remington Model 760 ADL Gamemaster
- Type: Pump action rifle
- Place of origin: United States

Production history
- Designer: L. Ray Crittendon, William Gail Jr.
- Manufacturer: Remington Arms
- Produced: 1951–1981
- No. built: 1,034,462
- Variants: see variants

Specifications
- Mass: 7 lb (3.2 kg)
- Length: 42.6 in (108 cm)
- Barrel length: 22 in (56 cm)
- Cartridge: .30-06 Springfield (1951–1981); .300 Savage (1952–1960); .35 Remington (1952–1967, 1979); .270 Winchester (1952–1981); .257 Roberts (1954–1961); .244 Remington (1957–1960); .308 Winchester (1955–1981); .222 Remington (1958–1960); .280 Remington (1958–1967); .223 Remington (1964–1968); .243 Winchester (1955–1981); 6mm Remington (1968–1981)
- Action: Pump action, rotating bolt with interrupted thread
- Feed system: 4-round detachable box magazine

The Remington Model 760 Gamemaster is a pump-action, centerfire rifle made by Remington Arms from 1952 to 1981. The Model 760 replaced the Model 141 in the product lineup. Being fed by a box magazine freed the design to use more powerful rounds with spitzer bullets. It was succeeded by the Remington Model 7600 series.

== Design ==
Following World War II, many of Remington's pre-war firearms resumed production. This created a dilemma for the company as it had produced martial arms during the war. Production of military arms had forced manufacturers to streamline production and use more economical methods and materials that were not adaptable to most earlier designs. Remington set about creating families of firearms that shared a common design and parts. This trend began with the Model 11-48 and continues to this day. The Model 870 and 1100 shotguns share a similar construction, styling, and many parts with the Model 760 and 740 rifles.

The 760 featured a detachable box magazine, dual action bars, and a removable aluminum trigger group. The bolt featured 14 locking lugs laid out in an interrupted-thread pattern. These lugs are locked into corresponding lugs in a barrel extension by means of a cam-rotated bolt. This bolt arrangement was problematic and the interrupted thread lugs were replaced with more conventional lugs on the Model 7600 that replaced it.

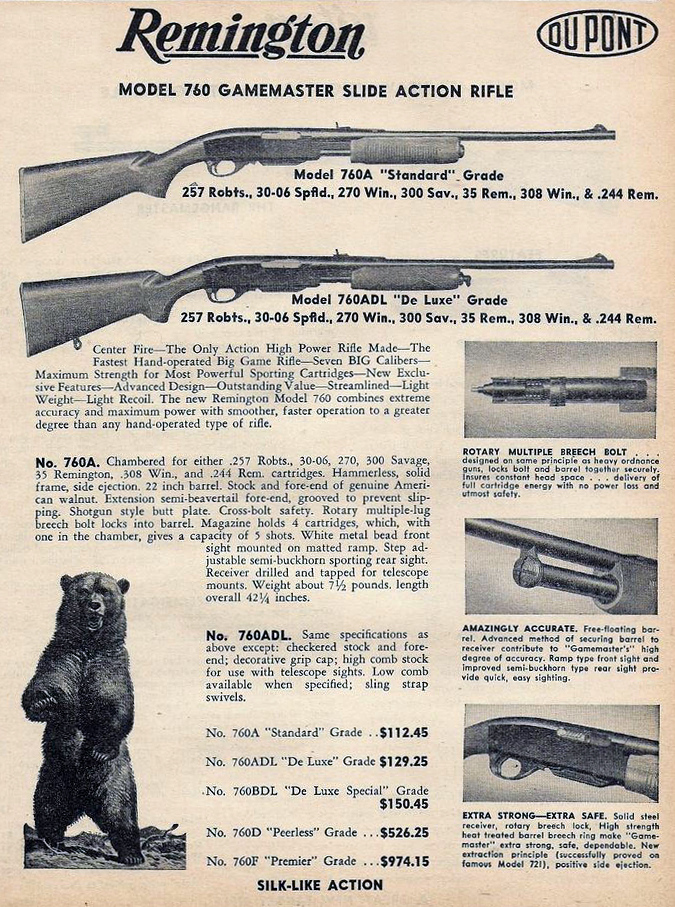
DuPont ad for the Remington 760, c. 1954

== Variants ==
A number of variants were manufactured mostly differing in the finish, stock style and grade, sights, and other small details. One version, the 760C, featured an 18.5" barrel.

== Criminal uses ==
James Earl Ray used a .30-06 Model 760 Gamemaster to assassinate Martin Luther King Jr., at the Lorraine Motel in Memphis, Tennessee, on April 4, 1968. The killing sparked riots across the country and was a factor in the passage of the Gun Control Act of 1968.

A .30-06 Model 760 was used in the 1999 OC Transpo shooting in which the gunman killed four other people and injured two before killing himself in an OC Transpo garage in Ottawa.
