= Remington Model 750 =

- Type: Rifle
- Place of origin: United States

Production history
- Designer: Remington R&D
- Manufacturer: Remington Arms
- Produced: 2006–2015
- Variants: See variants: Model 750 Synthetic; Model 750 Woodsmaster

Specifications
- Mass: 7.5 lb (3.4 kg)
- Length: 39.1 in (99 cm); 42.6 in (108 cm)
- Barrel length: 18.5 in (47 cm); 22 in (56 cm)
- Cartridge: .243 Winchester; .270 Winchester; .308 Winchester; .30-06 Springfield; .35 Whelen
- Action: Semi-automatic
- Sights: Iron, drilled & tapped for scope

The Remington Model 750 was a semi-automatic rifle and successor to earlier semi-automatic rifles Remington Model 740, Remington Model 742 and Remington Model 7400. Production began in 2006 and discontinued in 2015.

Standard magazine capacity was for rounds. Magazines up to 10-rounds are available. Barrel lengths were 22 or 18 inches.

== Variants ==
Since its introduction in 2006, the Model 750 has been offered in two main variants.

Model 750 Woodsmaster
Introduced in 2006, the Woodsmaster features a gas-operated action , a walnut stock and fore-end, and swivel studs for mounting a sling.
Model 750 Synthetic
The Synthetic model, introduced in 2007, is identical to the Woodsmaster except that it features a synthetic stock and for-end. And some of the synthetic variants have attached magazines.
