= Caliber change =

Modifying a firearm for a different cartridge

The term caliber change in firearms refers to the process of permanently altering a firearm to allow it to fire a different cartridge than the one it previously fired. With a bolt action rifle, this is mostly done by reshaping the current chamber through machining it with a new reamer, or by replacing the barrel with a new barrel, which has a new cartridge chamber machined into it.

The new barrel and chamber can be for a new cartridge with the same caliber bore as the previous, or a completely new caliber as well. It is usually preferred and easier to change to a cartridge with the same rim diameter as the previous cartridge, so the same bolt-face diameter can be used and no alteration to the bolt action or receiver is necessary.

Caliber changes become more prevalent in the past few years with the popularity of wildcatting, which has consistently introduced newer and often ballistically superior cartridges offering more efficiency.

Caliber changes to a firearm is mostly done by professional gunsmiths, for bot safety and accuracy, but with the advent of pre-fit barrels, some advanced firearm collectors and shooters have done their own caliber changes at home.

== See also ==
- Ackley Improved
- Obturation
- Wildcat cartridge
