= Mike Walker (engineer) =

Engineer (1911–2013)

Merle "Mike" H. Walker (December 5, 1911 - March 6, 2013) was a designer of firearms and cartridges, an engineer employed with Remington Arms for 37 years, and a leader in promoting the sport of benchrest shooting.

== Design and engineering ==
He is noted as the designer of the Remington Model 721, Model 722 and Model 700. The Model 700 has been called "the world's most popular bolt-action rifle."

Walker developed various cartridges while at Remington including .222 Remington, .244 Remington (later renamed 6mm Remington), and 6mm BR.

Walker also held patents, including one in 1950 for the trigger which went into the Remington Model 700. That trigger has been associated with misfiring for which he proposed a solution. He was also involved in inventing button rifling.

== Benchrest ==
Walker played a role in founding the International Bench Shooters and was its first president.
