= Remington Model 721 =

Remington 721, 722, & 725
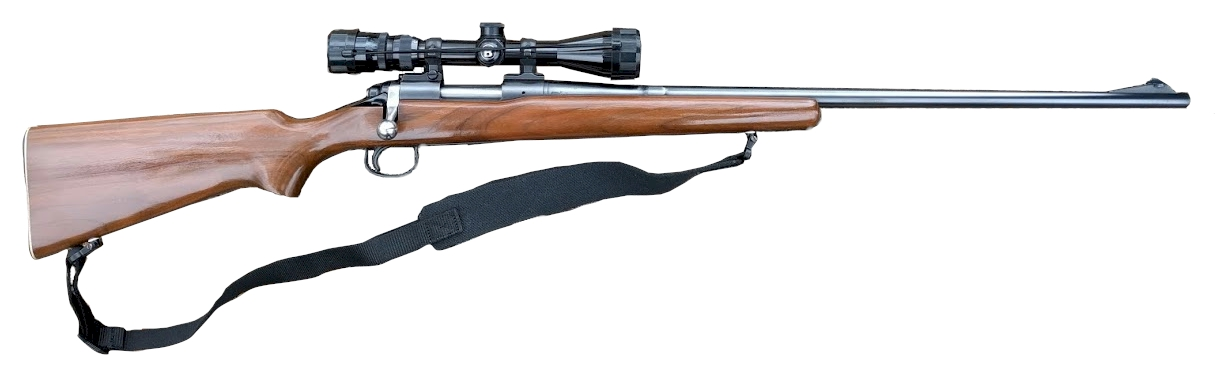
- Remington Model 722A with rifle scope and sling
- Type: Rifle
- Place of origin: United States

Production history
- Designer: Mike Walker & Homer W. Young
- Manufacturer: Remington Arms
- Produced: 1948–1962
- No. built: Model 721 & 722 - ~118,000; Model 725 - ~17,000
- Variants: 722, 725

Specifications
- Cartridge: 721 Calibers: .264 Winchester Magnum; .270 Winchester; .280 Remington; .30-06 Springfield; .300 H&H Magnum; 722 Calibers: .222 Remington; .222 Remington Magnum; .243 Winchester; .244 Remington; .257 Roberts; .300 Savage; .308 Winchester; 725 Calibers: .270 Winchester; .280 Remington; .30-06 Springfield; .222 Remington; .243 Winchester; .244 Remington; .375 H&H Magnum; .458 Winchester Magnum
- Action: Bolt action, rotating bolt with 2 lugs
- Feed system: Internal box magazine
- Sights: Iron Sights with scope mount holes

The Model 721 and Model 722 along with the later Model 725 variant are bolt-action sporting rifles manufactured by Remington Arms from 1948 until 1961. The 721/722 replaced the short-lived Model 720. The Model 721/722 is considered to be one of the first modern, economically produced sporting rifles whose design largely continued with the subsequent and highly successful Model 700. Manufactured with high precision, it is known for exceptional accuracy. The bolt and receiver design, based on the Mauser action, is considered one of the strongest ever produced. Samples in excellent condition have become collectible.

== History ==
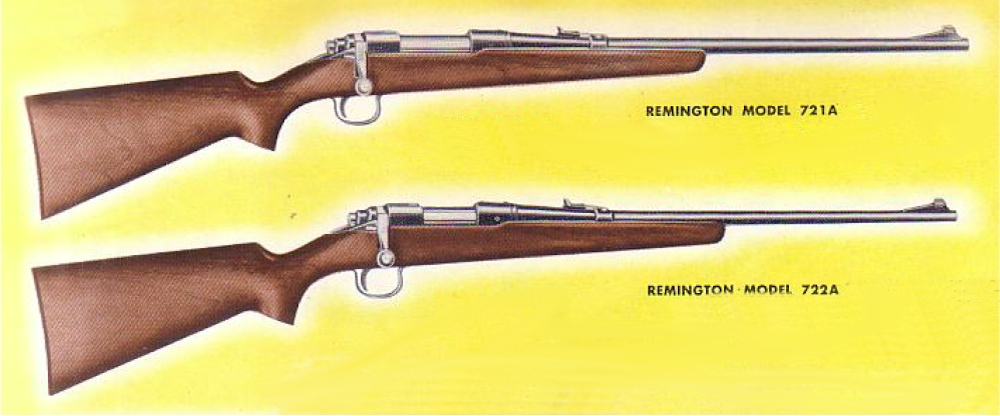
Remington Model 721A and 722A as shown in 1948

Prior to World War II, the Remington Model 30, had been the standard Remington bolt action sporting rifle. However production had halted during World War II.

During the war, Remington gained experience manufacturing large quantities of martial firearms more efficiently. By the end of the war, manufacturing technology had advanced significantly. By these standards, older designs like the Model 30 (and the Model 720 variant) were laborious and expensive to produce and could not take advantage of manufacturing advancements.

The Mauser M 98 action was popularly recognized as being well suited to sporting rifle applications but was complex and would require design changes to better take advantage of modern production techniques.

Rather than continue manufacturing older rifles that had become expensive to produce, Remington chose to develop an altogether new and modern rifle design with Mike Walker and Homer Young playing key roles. These factors converged in the development of the Remington Model 721 / 722.

The new Model 721/722 was introduced in 1948. Deluxe versions became available in 1955. The Model 725 variant was later introduced in 1958. These models all share a common design differing only by features and may be collectively referred to within this article as the Model 721 unless otherwise noted. Model 721 production ended in 1961 with the replacement Model 700 taking over in 1962. The Model 700 was also designed by Mike Walker and largely continues the 721 design with modern aesthetic improvements.

== Design details ==
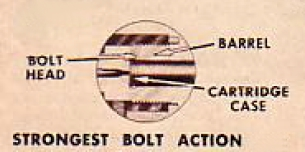
Remington described the bolt action as the strongest ever developed when introduced with enclosed bolt head encased in barrel

When compared to the Mauser 98 action, the Remington introduced several features meant to decrease production time and cost as well as increase the accuracy potential. The first was a redesign of the receiver from a billet-machined structure to a round profile. The round receiver can be produced on a lathe rather than requiring a mill. The recoil lug was a simple plate of steel sandwiched between the barrel and receiver (like on Savage Model 1920, but even simpler).

Remington advertised the rifle as having the "strongest bolt action ever developed." with a new encased bolt head. The bolt was redesigned and made from multiple pieces. The large claw extractor was eliminated in favor of a small, but effective part mounted in a newly recessed bolt face. The ejector was now a plunger on the bolt face rather than a blade mounted in the receiver.

A new adjustable trigger mechanism was fitted allowing for a sharper, crisp let off. A new safety design was also introduced. The same trigger and safety were used in the subsequent Model 700 and eventually came under criticism due to safety concerns.

Standard factory features included tapered barrel, American walnut sporting stock, polished bolt and action, drilled and tapped for scope mounts, four cartridge magazine, adjustable rear sight, matted ramp front sight, metal butt plate. Additional options included select figured walnut stocks, hand checkering and sling swivels.

=== Safety flaw in the firing mechanism design ===
Even before the rifle was released for the public, a potentially fatal flaw in the design was discovered: a defect in the firing mechanism could fire the gun without the trigger being squeezed; Mike Walker's proposed fix was declined because of an additional 5.5 cents (adjusted for inflation: $0.74) per rifle in production costs. Despite thousands of complaints both from civilian customers as well as the military and quite a few deaths, the issue was left not mitigated even past the Model 721's end of production and inherited by the Model 700.

== Production ==
Remington manufactured the Model 721 in Ilion, New York. Production estimates are:

- Model 721 and Model 722: ~118,000
- Model 725: ~17,000

== Model variants ==
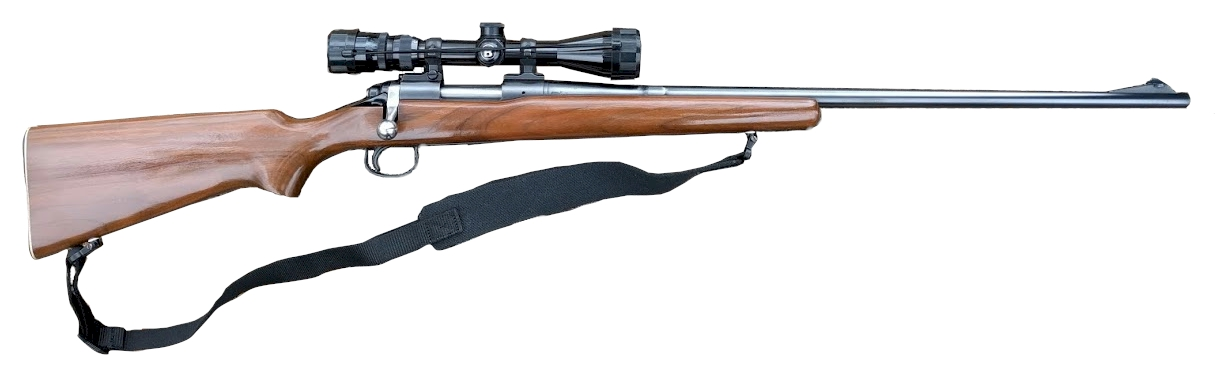
Remington Model 722A from 1955 Chambered in .244

- Model 721A Standard grade
- Model 721BDL Deluxe grade
- Model 722A Standard grade
- Model 722BDL Deluxe grade
- Model 725ADL Deluxe grade

Most rifle magazines had a capacity for 4 cartridges. The .222 Remington version could hold 5 cartridges and the larger .300 H&H Magnum and other similarly large cartridges were limited to 3 cartridges in the magazine. Barrels were tapered with lengths, depending on year and caliber, ranging from 22 to 26 inches.

=== Model 721 ===
The Model 721 was the long-action version designed for longer cartridges.

The 721A Standard grade was available during all years of production. Standard grade features included American walnut sporting stock, polished bolt and action, drilled and tapped for scope mounts, four cartridge magazine, adjustable rear sight, matted ramp front sight, metal butt plate.

The 721BDL Deluxe grade was available from 1955 until 1957 and ultimately replaced by the 725. In addition to the standard features, the BDL version featured select figured American walnut stock, hand checkering and sling swivels.

The .300 H&H Magnum version included a rubber butt pad. The box magazine could only contain three rounds instead of the usual four.

=== Model 722 ===
The Model 722 was the short-action version designed for shorter cartridges.

The 722A Standard grade was available during all years of production. Standard grade features included American walnut sporting stock, polished bolt and action, drilled and tapped for scope mounts, four cartridge magazine, adjustable rear sight, matted ramp front sight, metal butt plate.

The 722BDL Deluxe grade was available from 1955 until 1957 and ultimately replaced by the 725. In addition to the standard features, the BDL version featured select figured American walnut stock, hand checkering and sling swivels.

The .222 Remington version was often singled out from other 722s and marketed as a varmint rifle often featuring a 26-inch barrel.

=== Model 725 ===
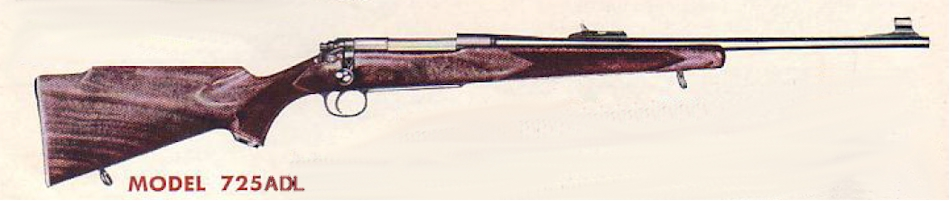
Remington 725ADL as shown in 1960

The Model 725ADL was introduced in 1958 replacing the 721BDL and 722BDL as the deluxe offering in the 721 line. The 725ADL was produced from 1958 until 1961. Unlike the 721/722, the 725 was only produced in a long action despite being chambered for a variety of both short and long cartridges. The 725ADL included a walnut Monte Carlo stock rather than the sporting stock of the 721/722. A hinged floor plate was included to facilitate unloading. Most of these features continued in the later Model 700, underscoring the 725ADL as a transitional model. The 725ADL did however uniquely use an older safety design rather than the safety used by the 721/722 as well as the later 700. A rare 725 Kodiak model was made in 1961 with limited availability. This variant was uniquely chambered for .375 H&H Magnum and .458 Winchester Magnum.

=== Models by year ===
Year	Standard	Deluxe
1948	721A, 722A	
1949	721A, 722A	
1950	721A, 722A	
1951	721A, 722A	
1952	721A, 722A	
1953	721A, 722A	
1954	721A, 722A	
1955	721A, 722A	721BDL, 722BDL
1956	721A, 722A	721BDL, 722BDL
1957	721A, 722A	721BDL, 722BDL
1958	721A, 722A	725ADL
1959	721A, 722A	725ADL
1960	721A, 722A	725ADL
1961	721A, 722A	725ADL

=== Calibers Chambered ===
Depending on year and model variant, Remington chambered the rifles for a variety of cartridges.

Year	Model 721			
1948	270 Win		300 Mag	30-06
1949	270 Win		300 Mag	30-06
1950	270 Win		300 Mag	30-06
1951	270 Win		300 Mag	30-06
1952	270 Win		300 Mag	30-06
1953	270 Win		300 Mag	30-06
1954	270 Win		300 Mag	30-06
1955	270 Win		300 Mag	30-06
1956	270 Win		300 Mag	30-06
1957	270 Win		300 Mag	30-06
1958	270 Win		300 Mag	30-06
1959	270 Win		300 Mag	30-06
1960	270 Win	280 Rem	300 Mag	30-06
1961	270 Win	280 Rem	300 Mag	30-06

Year	Model 722						
1948					257 Roberts	300 Sav	
1949					257 Roberts	300 Sav	
1950	222 Rem				257 Roberts	300 Sav	
1951	222 Rem				257 Roberts	300 Sav	
1952	222 Rem				257 Roberts	300 Sav	
1953	222 Rem				257 Roberts	300 Sav	
1954	222 Rem				257 Roberts	300 Sav	
1955	222 Rem			244 Rem	257 Roberts	300 Sav	308 Win
1956	222 Rem			244 Rem	257 Roberts	300 Sav	308 Win
1957	222 Rem			244 Rem	257 Roberts	300 Sav	308 Win
1958	222 Rem	222 Mag		244 Rem	257 Roberts	300 Sav	308 Win
1959	222 Rem	222 Mag		244 Rem	257 Roberts	300 Sav	308 Win
1960	222 Rem	222 Mag	243 Win	244 Rem	257 Roberts		308 Win
1961	222 Rem	222 Mag	243 Win	244 Rem	257 Roberts		308 Win

Year	Model 725							
1958				270 Win	280 Rem	30-06		
1959	222 Rem		244 Rem	270 Win	280 Rem	30-06		
1960	222 Rem	243 Win	244 Rem	270 Win	280 Rem	30-06		
1961	222 Rem	243 Win	244 Rem	270 Win	280 Rem	30-06	.375 H&H	.458 Win Mag

== Legacy ==
Originally offered at less than 90 USD (about 1206 USD today), the rifles were affordable and well received by the public at the time of introduction. The rifles developed a reputation for accuracy unmatched by other mass-produced sporting rifles of the era. While prices were affordable, the standard grade version have been criticized for plain aesthetics and stamped steel trigger guard.

Larry Potterfield, Founder and CEO of MidWayUSA identified the Model 721 as earning "a spot in the firearms hall of fame". He described it as a strong, accurate, economically produced and well received rifle at the time of its introduction.

Perhaps the most enduring legacy of the Model 721 is the Remington Model 700, the best-selling bolt-action rifle in history and considered to be one of the greatest centerfire hunting rifles ever produced. The Model 700 replaced the 721 in 1962 but largely continued the 721 design while incorporating modern aesthetic improvements (many of which were previewed in the 725). Today many appreciate and collect samples from the 721 family particularly those in excellent condition or with rare features or uncommon calibers.

== See also ==
- Remington Model 700 Development
- Mauser M 98
