= Remington Model 742 =

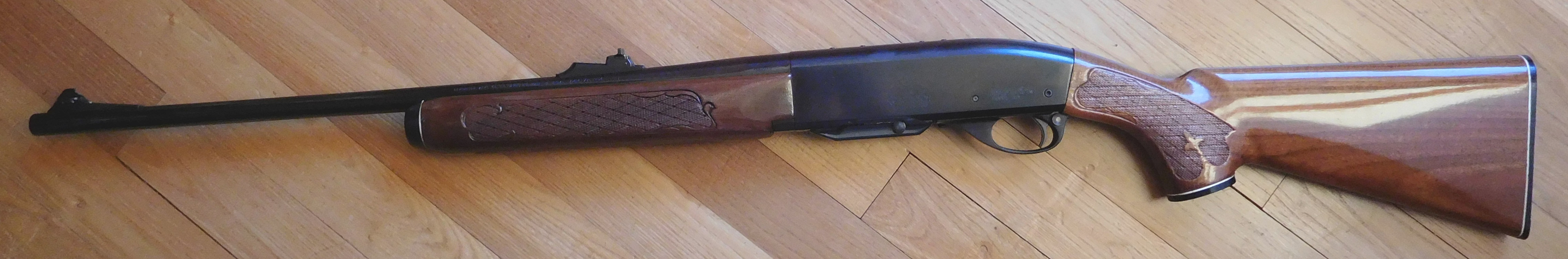
- A Remington Model 742 Woodsmaster
- Type: Semi-automatic rifle
- Place of origin: United States

Service history
- Used by: Provisional IRA
- Wars: The Troubles

Production history
- Designer: Remington R&D
- Manufacturer: Remington Arms
- Produced: 1960–1980
- No. built: 1,433,269

Specifications
- Mass: 7.5 lb (3.4 kg)
- Barrel length: 22 in (56 cm)
- Cartridge: .243 Winchester; 6mm Remington; .280 Remington; .30-06 Springfield; .308 Winchester
- Action: Gas operated, Semi-auto
- Feed system: 4-round magazine

The Remington Model 742, also known as the Woodsmaster, is a semi-automatic rifle that was produced by Remington Arms from 1960 until 1980.

== Design ==
It uses a straight 4-round magazine, a 10-round magazine, and a rare 20-round magazine. Features include a side ejection port and a free-floating barrel. It uses the same action as the Remington 1100 series shotguns, with both having the venerable 870 series as the parent gun. In 1981, the Model 742 was replaced by the Model 7400, followed by the Remington Model 750.

The Model 742 was available in different grades; ADL Deluxe, DBL Deluxe, CDL, Peerless and Premier Grade. The C model was a carbine version with an 18-inch barrel.
