= Remington Model 7400 =

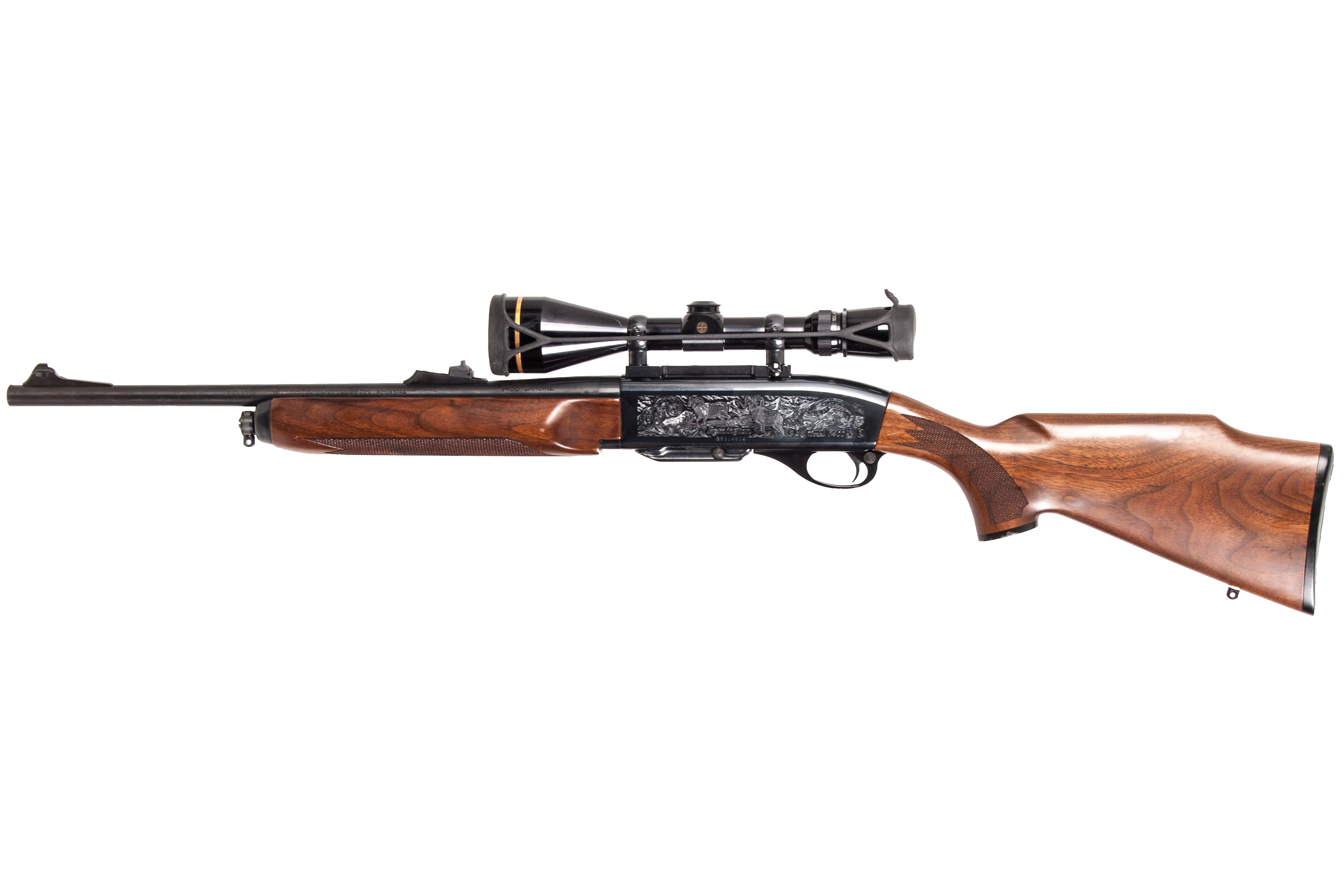
- Remington Model 7400 in .270 Win. with factory etching.
- Type: Semi automatic rifle
- Place of origin: United States

Production history
- Designer: Remington R&D
- Manufacturer: Remington Arms
- Produced: 1981–2004

Specifications
- Mass: 7.5 lb (3.4 kg)
- Length: 42 in (110 cm)
- Barrel length: 18 in (46 cm); 22 in (56 cm)
- Cartridge: 6mm Remington.243 Winchester.270 Winchester; 7mm Remington Express.280 Remington.30-06 Springfield.308 Winchester.35 Whelen
- Sights: Iron sights (rear sight adjustable for windage and elevation); receiver drilled and tapped for scope mounts

The Remington Model 7400 is a series of semi-automatic rifles manufactured by Remington Arms. The Model 7400 was a replacement of the Model 740 rifle which Remington produced from 1952 to 1981. The 7400 model was ultimately replaced by the Model 750 in 2006.

== History ==
The Model 7400 was first sold in 1981. It is similar to the Model Four, but has a checkered pistol-grip and a straight comb style stock. There are two varieties of barrels: a 22 in (56 cm) version and a 18 in (46 cm) version (introduced in 1988 as the Carbine).

== Variants ==
Model 7400 Carbine
Manufactured from 1988 to 2004, the carbine version featured a shortened 18 in (46 cm) barrel.
Model 7400 Special Purpose
Sold in 1993 and 1993, the Special Purpose Model was non-reflective and had sling swivels.
Model 7400 Synthetic
Introduced in 1998, the synthetic model has a non-reflctive finish. The stock is reinforced with fiberglass.

=== Model 7400 Weathermaster ===
Introduced in 2003, the Weathermaster model features a synthetic black stock and a matte nickel finish.
