= .280 Ackley Improved =

US rifle cartridge

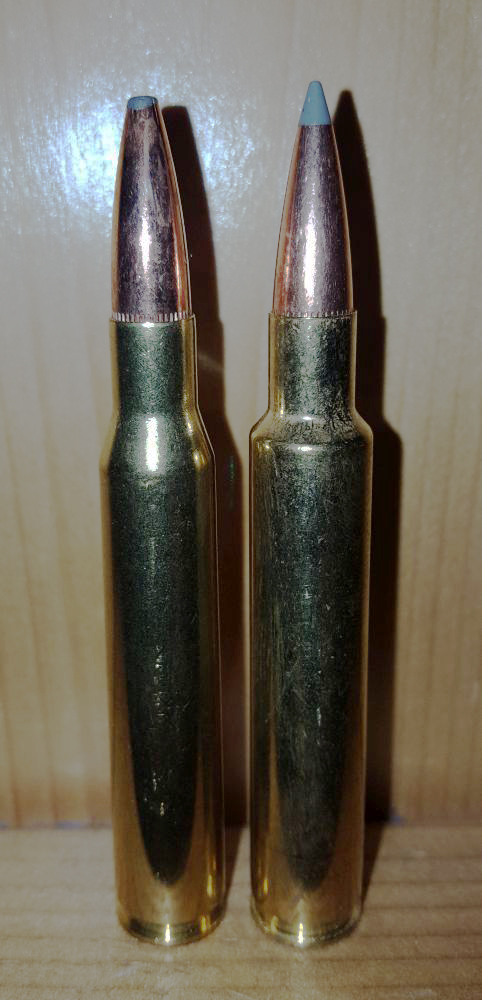
- .280 Ackley Improved on the right, with .280 Remington
- Type: Rifle
- Place of origin: United States

Production history
- Designer: P.O. Ackley
- Manufacturer: Nosler

Specifications
- Parent case: .280 Remington
- Case type: Rimmed, bottleneck
- Bullet diameter: .284 in (7.2 mm)
- Neck diameter: .315 in (8.0 mm)
- Shoulder diameter: .454 in (11.5 mm)
- Base diameter: .471 in (12.0 mm)
- Rim diameter: .473 in (12.0 mm)
- Case length: 2.525 in (64.1 mm)
- Overall length: 3.330 in (84.6 mm)
- Rifling twist: 1-9
- Primer type: large rifle
- Maximum pressure (SAAMI): 65,000 psi (448 MPa)

The .280 Ackley Improved (.280 AI) was the result of the .280 Remington case modification by P.O Ackley, who pushed out the sidewalls at the shoulder to near parallel and steepened the shoulder angle to 40 degrees in order to increase powder capacity, thus along with increasing the allowable pressure, resulted in increasing the bullet initial velocity by approximately 100 fps.

== History ==
In 1957 Remington introduced the .280 Remington, which was based on the .30-06 Springfield case necked down to 7mm. The cartridge was intended to compete with the .30-06 and the .270 Winchester.

Although the .280 Remington is considered to be a very balanced cartridge combining the best attributes of both cartridges due to the high ballistic coefficient and sectional density characteristic of 7mm calibers, it did not reach the popularity achieved by the .30-06 and .270 Win.

The famous wildcatter P.O Ackley worked on the .280 Remington case in order to add it to the line of "Ackley Improved" cartridges and named it the .280 Ackley Improved 40 degrees. By 2008, Nosler standardized it and SAAMI accepted it. Ever since, the .280 Ackley Improved has earned great popularity in the US market. Several different companies manufacture rifles chambered in .280 AI, including the Ruger M77 Hawkeye, Savage 110, Browning X-Bolt and Weatherby Mark V.

== Design ==
The .280 AI is basically the .280 Remington redesigned by steepening its case shoulder and straightening the sidewalls to near parallel, thus resulting in an increased powder capacity giving 100 fps greater muzzle velocity, comparable to the 7mm Remington Magnum. A .280 Remington cartridge fired from a rifle chambered in .280 Ackley Improved will result in a case formed for the latter, which may be used for reloading.

== Performance ==
=== 280 Ackley Improved vs. 280 Remington ===
Loaded with a 150 grain bullet, the .280 AI shot from a 24" barrel gives a muzzle velocity of approximately 3,060 fps, which is about 100 fps faster than a .280 Remington loaded with a bullet of similar weight. Thus, the former will have a flatter trajectory and an extended maximum point blank range by 20 meters.

=== 280 Ackley Improved vs. 270 Winchester ===
A 150 grain bullet shot from a .280 AI generates a muzzle velocity similar to the .270 Winchester firing a 130 grain bullet. Being a heavier projectile, the .280 AI carries 15% more energy than the 130 grain bullet, and with flatter trajectory & further maximum point blank range. If both cartridges are fired with bullets of the same weight, the .280 AI bullet travels faster with a flatter trajectory but the .270 Win offers 5% higher sectional density.

=== 280 Ackley Improved vs. 7mm Remington Magnum ===
According to Nosler reloading data, although the 7mm Remington Magnum does not provide more than 50 fps over the .280 AI with similar projectiles, the latter cartridge holds less powder in its case, thus it is considered more efficient. However, the published data is provided from a .280 AI tested with a 26" barrel rifle, while the 7mm Rem Mag was tested with a 24" barrel, which suggests that the velocity advantage should increase in favor of the 7mm Remington Magnum if both cartridges were tested from rifles with similar barrel lengths, and especially from reloads. An advantage to the 280 AI vs 7mm RM is an additional round capacity in typical internal rifle magazines with a minor penalty in performance and reduced recoil.

== Sporting use ==
For practical purposes, the .280 Ackley Improved is similar to the .270 Winchester, 30-06 Springfield and .280 Remingon. In other words, energy and maximum point blank range for this line of cartridges is similar, making them suitable for mid size big game such as white tail deer and Dall ram. With the correct bullets, any of these cartridges is suitable for larger game such as elk and red stag.
