= P. O. Ackley =

Gunsmith, author and columnist (1903–1989)

Parker Otto Ackley
- Born: May 25, 1903; Granville, New York, U.S.
- Died: August 23, 1989 (aged 86); Salt Lake City, Utah, U.S.
- Education: Syracuse University
- Occupations: Gunsmith, author
- Known for: Ammunition designs

Parker Otto Ackley (May 25, 1903 – August 23, 1989) was an American gunsmith, barrel maker, author, columnist, and wildcat cartridge developer. The Ackley Improved family of wildcat cartridges are designed to be easily made by rechambering existing firearms, and fireforming the ammunition to decrease body taper and increase shoulder angle, resulting in a higher case capacity. Ackley improved not only standard cartridges, but also other popular wildcats, and was the first to create a .17 caliber (4.5 mm) centerfire cartridge.

== Biography ==
Ackley began gunsmithing full-time in Oregon in 1936, but was interrupted by World War II. In 1945, he established a new shop in Trinidad, Colorado, and soon became one of the largest custom gunmakers in the United States. He was also on the staff of the magazines Guns&Ammo and Shooting Times, and was an instructor at the Trinidad State Junior College from 1946 to 1951, where he did much experimentation in the field of firearms.

== Wildcats and Ackley Improved Cartridges ==
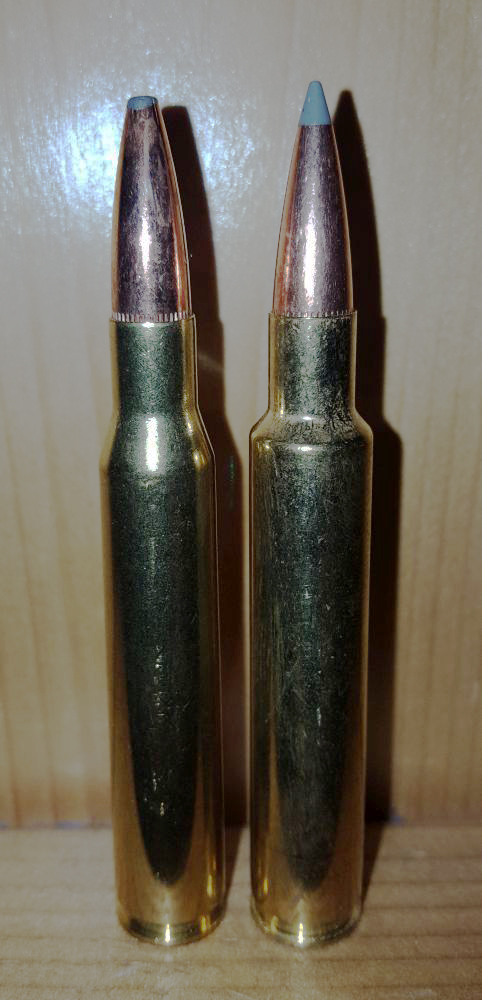
.280 Remington and its Ackley Improved variant

The following is a list of Ackley cartridges, both "Improved" versions (requiring only fireforming) and more complex versions involving case length reductions or caliber changes. In addition to being easy to form, firearms chambered for the "Improved" cartridges could fire standard factory loaded ammunition as well, allowing a shooter to use commonly available ammunition if the wildcat loads were not available.

- .17 Ackley Hornet, a .22 Ackley Hornet necked down to .17 caliber (4.5 mm)
- .17 Ackley Bee, a .218 Improved Bee necked down to .17 caliber (4.5 mm)
- .22 Ackley Improved Hornet, an improved .22 Hornet
- .218 Ackley Improved Bee, an improved .218 Bee
- .219 Zipper Improved, an improved .219 Zipper
- .22/.30-30 Ackley Improved, a .30-30 Ackley Improved necked down to .22 caliber (5.56 mm)
- .22-250 Ackley Improved, an improved .22-250 Remington
- .223 Ackley Improved, an improved .223 Remington
- .224 Belted Express, formed from .30-06 brass; very few die sets were made by RCBS
- .228 Ackley Magnum, an improved 7×57mm Mauser necked down to .228 caliber (5.8 mm); bullets in this size are hard to find but provide greater weight than .223 caliber bullets, up to 100 grains (6.5g), without excessively quick twist rate.
- 6 mm/.30-30 Improved, a .30-30 Ackley Improved necked down to 6 mm (.243)
- .243 Ackley Improved, an improved .243 Winchester
- .25 Ackley Krag, a .30-40 Krag necked down to .25 caliber (6.2 mm)
- .25-06 Ackley improved, an improved .25-06 Remington with a 40 degree angled shoulder
- .25 Ackley Krag Short, a slightly shortened .25 Ackley Krag
- .250-3000 Ackley Improved, an improved .250-3000 Savage
- .257 Ackley Improved, an improved .257 Roberts
- .260 Ackley Improved, an improved .260 Remington
- .270 Winchester Ackley Improved, an improved .270 Winchester
- 7×57mm Mauser Ackley Improved, an improved version of the 7×57mm Mauser cartridge with 40 degree shoulder, dies readily available.
- .280 Ackley Improved, an improved version of the .280 Remington cartridge with 40 degree shoulder, dies readily available. It duplicates the ballistics of the vaunted 7mm Remington Mag, with 30% less propellant used and less barrel erosion. Registered with SAAMI by Nosler.
- .30-30 Ackley Improved, an improved .30-30 Winchester

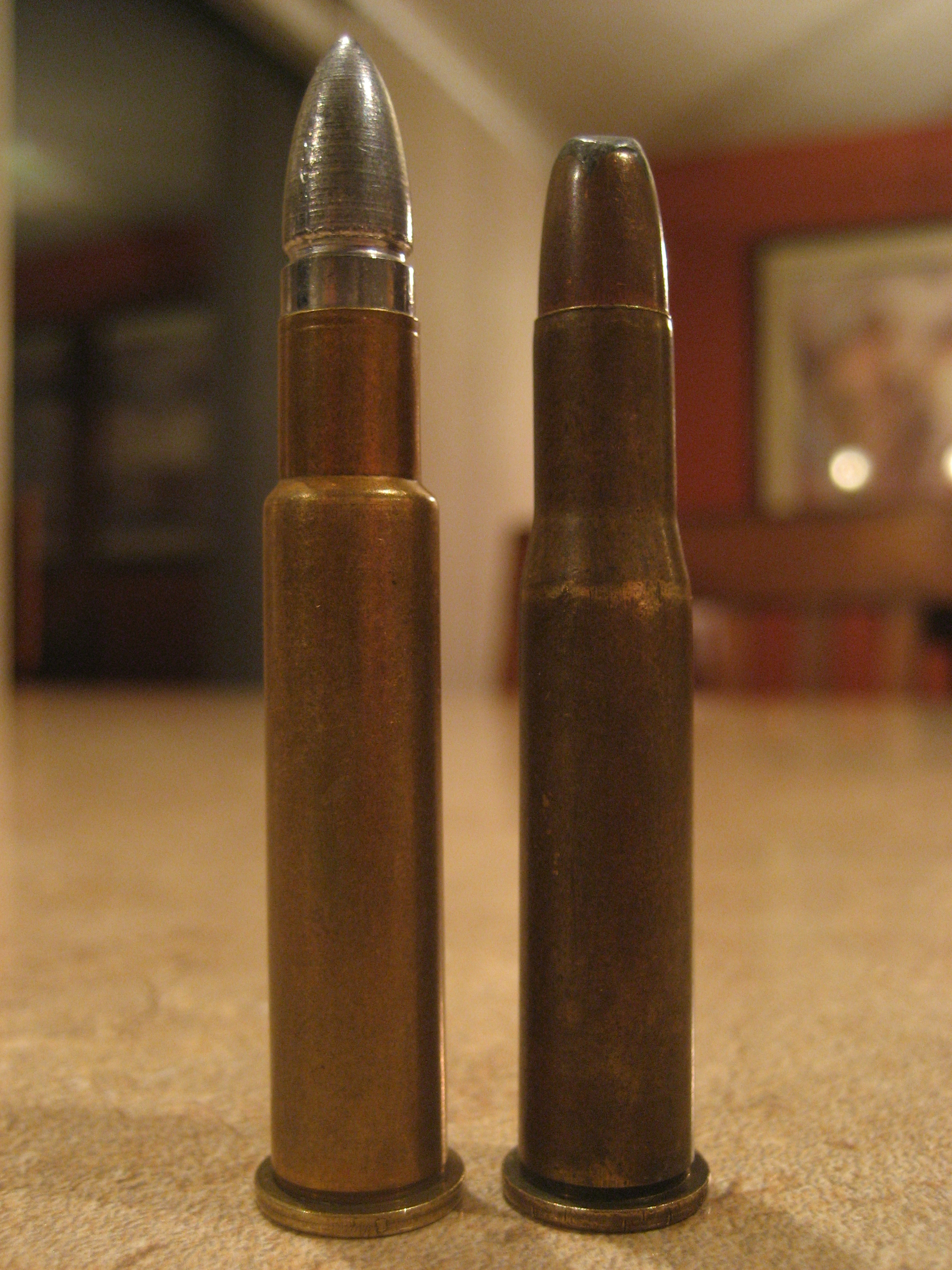
.30-30 Ackley Improved (Left) .30-30 Winchester (Right)

- .30-06 Ackley Improved, an improved .30-06 Springfield
- .30 Ackley Magnum No. 1 and No. 2 short, based on the Holland & Holland belted magnum, the No. 2 version designed to fit in standard length actions (.30-06 class)
- .303 Ackley Improved, an improved version of the .303 British Mark VII service cartridge
- .338-06 Ackley Improved, an improved .338-06 A-Square (which is a .30-06 necked up to .338 caliber)
- .348 Ackley improved, an improved .348 Winchester which gets about 200 feet a second more velocity over the standard.
- .35 Ackley Magnum No. 1 and No. 2 short, based on the .30 Ackley Magnum cases; there is also an Improved version of the No. 2.
- .450 Ackley Magnum, based on .375 H&H Magnum necked up to .458
- .475 Ackley Magnum, based on a .375 H&H Magnum necked up to .475 (12 mm)

== Other research ==
Ackley was not just a wildcatter but a researcher as well, often testing firearms to destruction in the search for information. He also produced a number of experimental cartridges, not intended to be practical, but rather to test the limits of firearms. One of these experimental cartridges was the .22 Eargesplitten Loudenboomer. This humorously named cartridge was developed by Ackley for Bob Hutton of Guns & Ammo magazine, and was intended solely to exceed 5,000 ft/s (1,500 m/s) muzzle velocity. Ackley's loads only managed 4,600 ft/s (1,400 m/s)(Mach 4.2), firing a 50-grain (3.2 g) bullet. Based on a .378 Weatherby Magnum case, the case is impractically over-capacity for the bore diameter, and so the cartridge remains a curiosity. The advent of new slower-burning smokeless powders may have changed the equation.

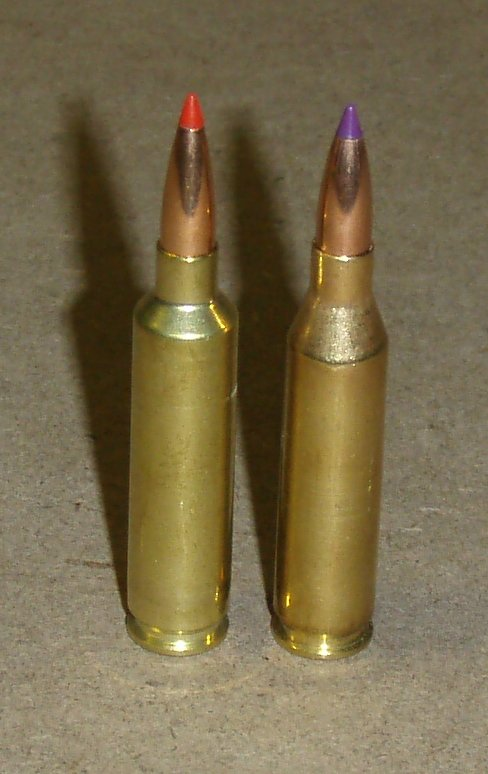
A .243 Winchester (right) beside the Ackley Improved version; only the shoulder angle is changed to the sharper shoulder angle typical of the Ackley Improved cartridges. In this instance the shoulder diameter of the Improved normally remains the same as the original case at .456"-.457" with no significant change in body taper. However, minor variations exist with some drawings showing a slightly larger .460" shoulder diameter.
