= Remington Model 740 =

Remington Woodsmaster 740
- Type: Rifle
- Place of origin: United States

Production history
- Designer: Remington R&D
- Manufacturer: Remington Arms
- Produced: 1955–1960
- No. built: 251,398

Specifications
- Mass: 7.5 lb (3.4 kg)
- Length: 42.5 in (108 cm)
- Barrel length: 22 in (56 cm)
- Cartridge: .244 Remington; .280 Remington; .308 Winchester; .30-06 Springfield
- Action: Semi-automatic
- Feed system: 4-round magazine, 10-round magazine (common, aftermarket)
- Sights: White metal bead ramp front Step-adjustable semi-buckhorn rear

The Remington Woodsmaster Model 740 is a semi-automatic rifle manufactured by Remington Arms between 1955 and 1959. The rifle had a 22-inch barrel and a four-round magazine. The original calibers were .30-06 and .308, but calibers .244 and .280 were made available subsequently. The blued metal barreled action was mounted in a walnut stock. The stock was a plain, straight comb with a semi-beavertail forend with finger grooves. This model was succeeded by the Remington Model 742 in 1960 and the Remington Model 7400 in 1980.
