= 6mm Remington =

Rifle cartridge

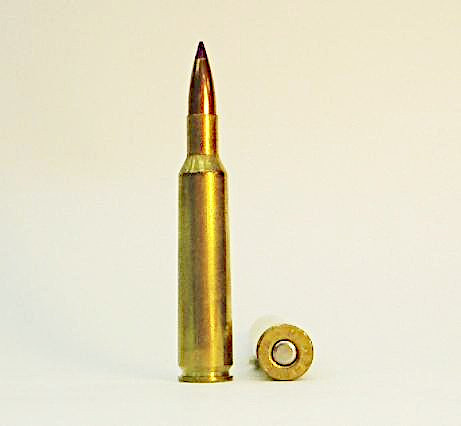
- Type: Rifle
- Place of origin: United States

Production history
- Designer: Fred Huntington & Mike Walker
- Designed: 1955
- Manufacturer: Remington
- Produced: 1955–present
- Variants: .244 Remington

Specifications
- Parent case: 7×57mm Mauser
- Case type: Rimless, bottleneck
- Bullet diameter: .2435 in (6.18 mm)
- Neck diameter: .276 in (7.0 mm)
- Shoulder diameter: .429 in (10.9 mm)
- Base diameter: .471 in (12.0 mm)
- Rim diameter: .473 in (12.0 mm)
- Case length: 2.233 in (56.7 mm)
- Overall length: 2.825 in (71.8 mm)
- Rifling twist: 1-9"
- Primer type: Large rifle
- Maximum pressure (SAAMI): 65,000 psi (450 MPa)

Ballistic performance
Bullet mass/type	Velocity	Energy
55 gr (4 g) BT	4,031 ft/s (1,229 m/s)	1,985 ft⋅lbf (2,691 J)
65 gr (4 g) VMax	3,739 ft/s (1,140 m/s)	2,018 ft⋅lbf (2,736 J)
80 gr (5 g) SP	3,485 ft/s (1,062 m/s)	2,158 ft⋅lbf (2,926 J)
95 gr (6 g) BT	3,156 ft/s (962 m/s)	2,102 ft⋅lbf (2,850 J)
105 gr (7 g) RNSP	2,969 ft/s (905 m/s)	2,056 ft⋅lbf (2,788 J)
- Test barrel length: 24"; Source: Accurate Powder

The 6mm Remington rifle cartridge, originally introduced in 1955 by Remington Arms Company as the .244 Remington, is based on a necked down .257 Roberts cartridge (itself a necked-down 7×57mm Mauser) using a .24/6mm bullet. Known for a combination of high velocity, long range, flat trajectory, and accuracy, it is suitable as a dual use hunting cartridge for both medium-sized big game and varmints. When used in the less common earlier slow twist barrels, it offers exceptional range for varmint applications. While not as commercially popular today as the .243 Winchester, the 6mm Remington enjoys a slight ballistic advantage and continues to be popular with handloaders and custom rifle builders.

== Developmental history ==
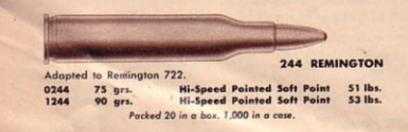

By the early 1950s, there had been a significant amount of experimentation and 'wildcatting' in developing the .24 caliber bullet as a dual purpose hunting round. Popular cartridges necked down for this purpose included the .257 Roberts (based on the 7x57mm Mauser) and .308 Winchester.

The existing Remington Model 722 was chambered for the new .244 Remington cartridge with a 1 in 12-inch twist. Remington originally offered this cartridge with 75 grain bullets for varmints and 90 grain bullets for medium-sized big game such as deer and antelope.

Remington determined that a 90 grain soft point .244 hunting bullet was well suited for medium-sized big game hunting purposes. For the length and weight of its 90 grain soft point hunting bullet, Remington selected a 1 in 12-inch twist. By selecting the slowest twist possible, Remington was seeking to avoid excessive spin. By avoiding excessive spin they were able to maximize velocity, range and accuracy of their 90 grain big game hunting bullet as well as lighter varmint loads.

== Performance ==
=== Recoil ===
The 6mm Remington has the advantage of a relatively low recoil of about 10 ft/lbs depending on load. Some gun writers, including Chuck Hawks of Guns and Shooting Online believe that this has the advantage of allowing shooters to be comfortable with the rifle without developing a flinch, allowing them to focus on accurate shot placement.

=== Comparison ===
Inevitably the 6mm Remington cartridge is highly comparable to the 243 Winchester. Both were intended for the same purposes, both developed out of wildcat loads and both were introduced in the same year. In 1963 Remington produced both cartridges using their own sourced brass, primers, powder and bullets. This allows for comparative data from a single manufacturer and in the case of the 100 grain bullet, identical bullets were even used. The following table summarizes performance data published in Remington's 1963 catalog:

Cartridge	Application	No.	Grain	Bullet	Velocity - Feet Per Second				Energy - Foot Pounds			
Cartridge	Application	No.	Grain	Bullet	Muzzle	100	200	300	Muzzle	100	200	300
244 Rem	varmint	0244	75	Rem Pointed Soft Point	3,500	3,070	2,660	2,290	2,040	1,570	1,180	875
243 Win	varmint	0243	80	Rem Pointed Soft Point	3,500	3,080	2,720	2,410	2,180	1,690	1,320	1,030
244 Rem	big game	1244	90	Rem Pointed Soft Point	3,200	2,850	2,530	2,230	2,050	1,630	1,280	995
6mm Rem	big game	1066	100	Rem Pointed Soft Point Core-Lokt	3,190	2,920	2,660	2,420	2,260	1,890	1,570	1,300
243 Win	big game	1243	100	Rem Pointed Soft Point Core-Lokt	3,070	2,790	2,540	2,320	2,090	1,730	1,430	1,190

The following summarizes comparative trajectory data between the 6mm Remington and .243 Winchester using the same 100 grain bullet:

Cartridge	Bullet	Velocity	in @ 100 yds	in @ 200 yds	3-inch mid-range trajectory	Maximum Point Blank Range (yds)
6mm Rem	100 gr Spitzer	3,100	2.5	2.2	150	296
243 Win	100 gr Spitzer	2,960	2.6	1.9	140	283

== Market acceptance ==
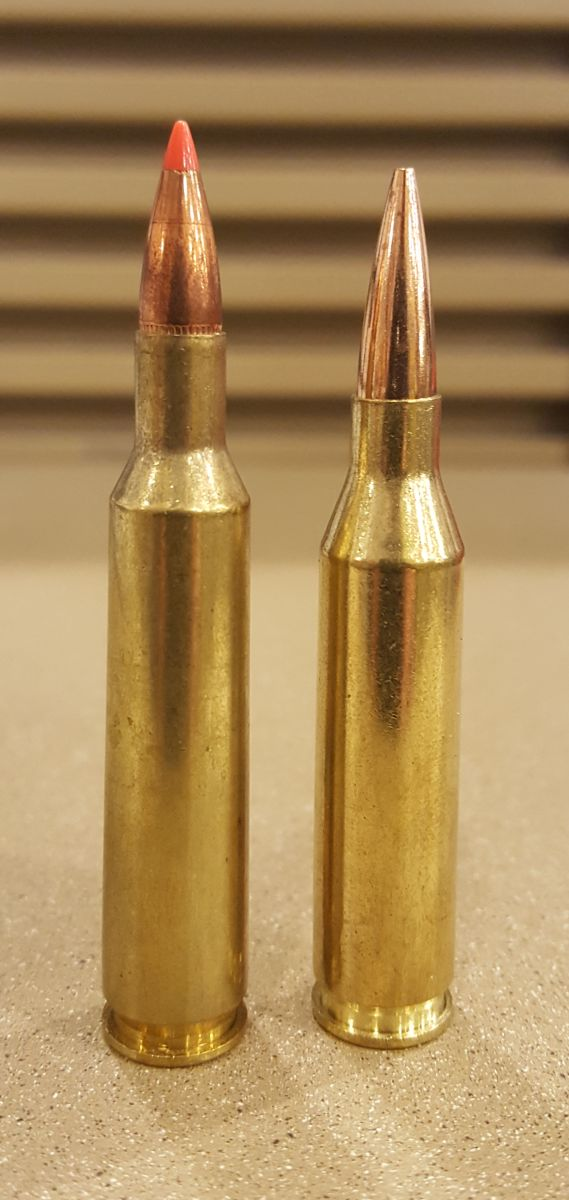
6mm Remington (left), .243 Winchester (right)

The .244 Remington lagged behind the .243 Winchester in the marketplace of the mid-1950s. Winchester also introduced a similar dual purpose cartridge of the same caliber with greater success in 1955, the .243 Winchester, but with 80 and 100 grain bullet options for its Model 70 with a 1 in 10-inch twist to allow for the slightly heavier bullet. Two common myths have been attributed to this difference in the marketplace: (A) The .244 being erroneously considered a varmint only cartridge and not suitable for deer and (B) the perceived 'plainness' of the original 722 Remington rifle it was offered in.

=== Varmint vs Big Game cartridge ===
In the mid 1950s, Remington singled out and marketed the .222 Remington, not the .244 Remington for varmint applications in catalogs and flyers. In present times, many mistakenly believe Remington originally developed and marketed the Model 722 in .244 primarily as a varmint rifle. By the 1990s, even Remington itself sometimes promoted its 6mm rifles specifically for varmint applications thus further propagating the perception.

While this lingering perception is not accurate, it does serve to underscore contributing factors to beliefs held since the mid-1950s. As noted earlier, Remington developed two .244 loads, one using the heavier 90 grain bullet specifically designed, marketed and intended for medium-sized big game such as deer and antelope. As Remington saw the 90 grain bullet to be well suited for big game hunting, they elected to match the slowest twist to that length of bullet specifically and avoid excessive projectile spin in favor of velocity. A 1 in 12-inch twist was selected and used initially.

Since the newly introduced .243 with its 100 grain bullet was also available, it is thought many consumers believed that to be the minimum mass needed to hunt deer. Likewise, the early Remington 722s often would not consistently gyroscopically stabilize 100 grain Spitzer bullets depending on their length and the original slower twist. While the rifles are now known to be inherently accurate with appropriate bullets, early misguided attempts to shoot longer 100 grain bullets that might not stabilize, gave the cartridge a bad, if inaccurate, reputation.

In December 1955, Guns Magazine writer, H. Jay Erfurth in an article titled Two Varmint-Big Game Rifles discussing the .244 Remington and .243 Winchester wrote "the Winchester bullet of 100 grains is the better one for deer and medium game than the 90-grain Remington pointed soft-point, though the differences seem mostly splitting hairs." He went on to write "With the 90 grain load, the 244 is a good deer cartridge and certainly effective on antelope and any lighter game."

Ultimately 90 grain hunting bullets such as the soft pointed Spitzer used by Remington are known to be well suited to medium-sized big game and the 722 to be an inherently accurate rifle.

=== Plain vs Deluxe Rifle ===
Some opine that the perceived plain nature of the Remington 722 caused the .244 to not be as successful as Winchesters .243. However Remington also offered a more upscale 722BDL Deluxe Grade chambered for .244 with more features including figured walnut stock, sling swivels mounts and checkered stock making it more directly comparable to the Model 70. The 722BDL list price was $120.95, still less than any of Winchester’s .243 rifle offerings. Three years later Remington offered the 725ADL in .244, a feature rich model akin to the modern Model 700. Had the early rifles chambered for .244 been more successful initially, critics could have just as easily pointed to Winchesters lack of value priced rifles in .243.

Erfurth went on to write about the Model 722 in .244 Remington, describing it this way: "Remington's [.244] offering comes in the M722 which is one of the least expensive, yet most modernly designed, bolt guns on the market."

The 721/722 rifle line was an overall success for Remington in various other calibers and competitively priced as a value offering for the market.

== Specifications ==
- Bullet diameter: .243 inches / 6mm / .244 inches
- Casing: 7x57mm
- Cartridge length: 2.825 inches
- Maximum case length: 2.233 inches
- MAP: 52,000 cup

== Firearms ==
Remington chambered at least twelve rifles for the 6mm cartridge.

Bolt-action Rifles

- Remington Model 722
- Remington Model 700
- Remington Model 725
- Remington Model 788
- Remington Model 600
- Remington Model 660

 Remington Model Seven

Semi-automatic Rifles

- Remington Model 740
- Remington Model 742
- Remington Model 7400
- Remington Model Four

Pump-action Rifles

- Remington Model 760
- Remington Model 7600

Other manufacturers including Marlin, Savage, and Ruger have also chambered rifles for 6mm Remington over the years.

== Legacy ==
Ultimately the buying public of the 1950s responded more favorably to the .243 Winchester while the .244 struggled to gain greater market acceptance early on. Whether this was due to Winchester’s slightly heavier big game bullet option or the differences in the aesthetic features of the initial rifles themselves or other factors altogether, it is difficult to say in retrospect. Remington was quick to respond to early criticism by changing the twist rate by 1958 to allow for heavier bullets, as well as replacing the 722BDL with the even more upscale Model 725ADL rifle in 1958 and ultimately transitioning to the highly successful Model 700. Remington even re-branded the cartridge name itself for a fresh start with a 100-grain factory load as the 6mm Remington. While the 6mm Remington cartridge never took over the .24 caliber dual purpose market lead from .243 Winchester, it was successfully sustained in production for nearly six decades.

As compared to the 1950s, there is broader public insight and knowledge of ballistic information today. This has led to a greater appreciation of the 6mm Remington. Hunters and long range shooters appreciate the cartridge capacity and ballistic capacity the 6mm Remington cartridge offers. Handloaders benefit from a long cartridge neck which facilitates loading operations and one of the widest selections of bullets available in any caliber. Prized among some are the earlier slow twist version .244 rifles for their ability to push higher velocities with lighter loads due to a lack of excessive spin.

== See also ==
- List of rifle cartridges
- Table of handgun and rifle cartridges
- 6 mm caliber
- .243 Winchester
- Rifling twist rate
- Ballistics
- Ballistic coefficient
- Delta L problem
- Miller twist rule
