= .222 Remington =

Centerfire rifle cartridge

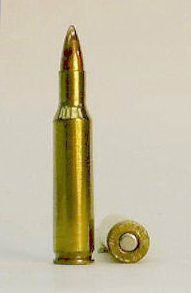
- Type: Rifle
- Place of origin: United States

Service history
- In service: 1950

Production history
- Manufacturer: Remington

Specifications
- Case type: Rimless, bottleneck
- Bullet diameter: .224 in (5.7 mm)
- Neck diameter: .253 in (6.4 mm)
- Shoulder diameter: .357 in (9.1 mm)
- Base diameter: .376 in (9.6 mm)
- Rim diameter: .378 in (9.6 mm)
- Rim thickness: .045 in (1.1 mm)
- Case length: 1.700 in (43.2 mm)
- Overall length: 2.130 in (54.1 mm)
- Case capacity: 26.9 gr H_{2}O (1.74 cm^{3})
- Rifling twist: 1 in 14 in (360 mm)
- Primer type: Small rifle
- Maximum pressure: 50,000 psi (340 MPa)

Ballistic performance
| Bullet mass/type | Velocity | Energy |
|---|---|---|
| 40 gr (3 g) HP | 3,583 ft/s (1,092 m/s) | 1,141 ft⋅lbf (1,547 J) |
| 50 gr (3 g) SP | 3,168 ft/s (966 m/s) | 1,115 ft⋅lbf (1,512 J) |
| 55 gr (4 g) SP | 3,095 ft/s (943 m/s) | 1,170 ft⋅lbf (1,590 J) |
| 60 gr (4 g) VMax | 2,937 ft/s (895 m/s) | 1,150 ft⋅lbf (1,560 J) |
- Test barrel length: 24"; Source: Hodgdon

.222 Remington maximum C.I.P. cartridge dimensions. All sizes in millimeters (mm) plus Imperial (inches).

The .222 Remington, also known as the triple deuce, triple two, and treble two, is a centerfire rifle cartridge. Introduced in 1950, it was the first commercial rimless .22 (5.56 mm) cartridge made in the United States. As such, it was an entirely new design, without a parent case. The .222 Remington was a popular target cartridge from its introduction until the mid-1970s and still enjoys a reputation for accuracy. It remains a popular vermin or "varmint" cartridge at short and medium ranges with preferred bullet weights of 40–55 grains and muzzle velocities from 3,000 to 3,500 ft/s (915–1,067 m/s).

== Introduction ==
The .222 Remington was developed by Mike Walker, an engineer at Remington, who shot it in a benchrest competition in 1950 at the Johnstown, New York, gun club. It was introduced with the Remington Model 722 bolt-action rifle. The accuracy and flat trajectory of the bullet resulted in the adoption of the round for varmint and benchrest rifles. The faster .220 Swift and .22-250 Remington provided more reach than the .222 Remington. These larger cartridges have roughly 50% more power than the .222, but also cause more muzzle blast and barrel erosion.

== Legacy ==
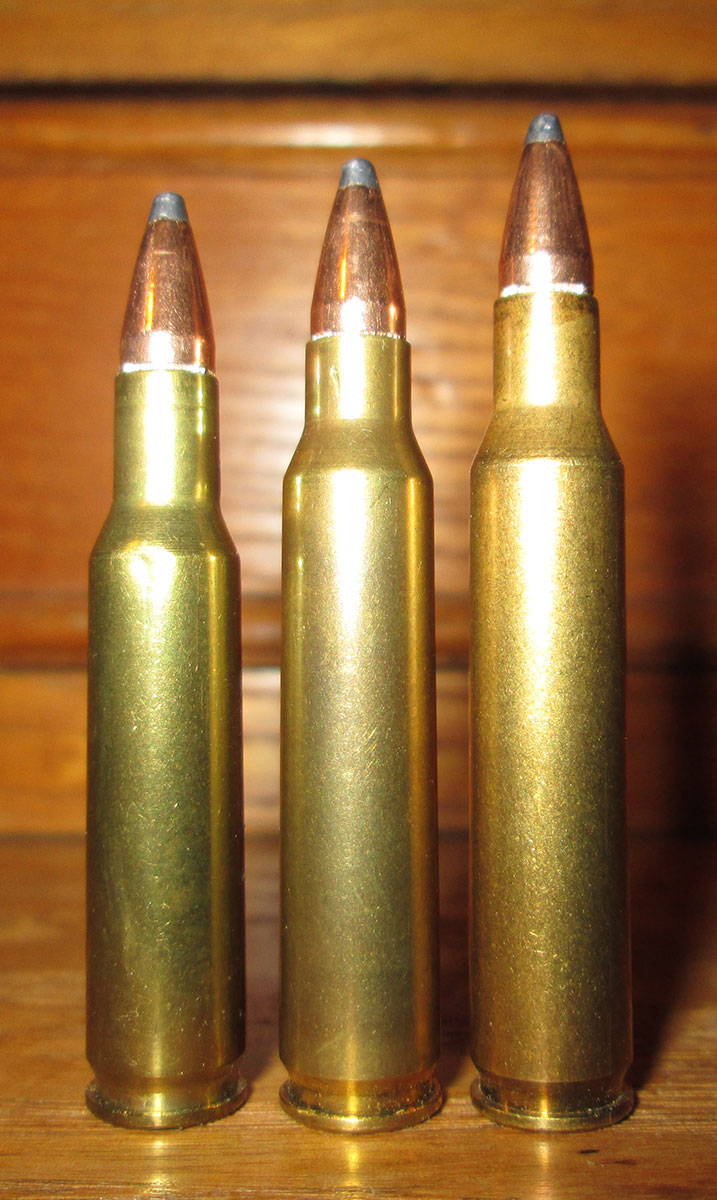
Size comparison between .222 (left), .223 (center) and .222 Magnum (right)

The .222 Remington was eventually eclipsed in benchrest competition by the 6mm PPC.

When the US military was looking for a new smallbore rifle cartridge, Remington started with the .222 Remington, and stretched it to increase powder capacity by about 20% in 1958 to make the .222 Remington Magnum. The greater powder capacity put the velocities between the standard .222 Remington and the .22-250. The cartridge was not accepted by the military, but it was introduced commercially. In 1963, the .222 Remington Special, also based on a stretched .222 case, was adopted along with the new M16 rifle as the .223 Remington / 5.56mm NATO. The NATO cartridge had a capacity only 5% less than the Magnum. Given the close performance to other cartridges and military acceptance, both the .222 Remington and the .222 Magnum faded quickly into obsolescence, being replaced by the .223 Remington.

While the .222 Remington is rarely found in current production in America, its derivative cartridges are among the most popular in the world. In addition to the .222 Magnum and .223 Remington, the .222 has also served as the parent case for the .221 Fireball, the fastest production handgun cartridge.

The .222 Remington is still fairly popular in Europe, where producers like Anschütz, Sako & Tikka, Steyr, Sauer and Weihrauch chamber rifles for this caliber. Firearms that are usually chambered for the .223 Remington/5.56×45mm NATO caliber are often rechambered for the .222 Remington for sale in countries where regulations restrict or forbid civilian ownership of "military calibers". Examples of countries with such legislation include Spain and France.

== See also ==
- 5 mm caliber
- Delta L problem
- List of rifle cartridges
- Table of handgun and rifle cartridges
