= .280 Remington =

US rifle cartridge

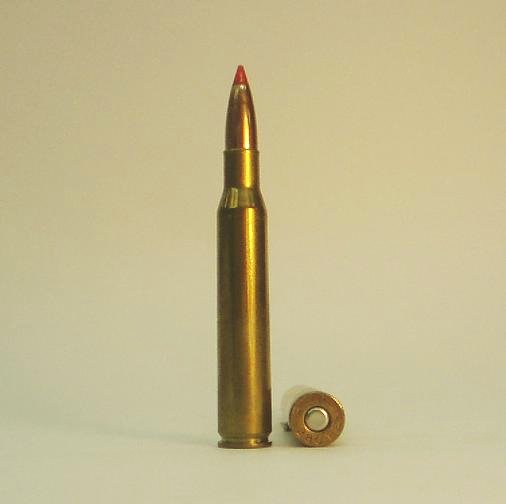
- Type: Rifle
- Place of origin: USA

Production history
- Designer: Remington
- Designed: 1957
- Manufacturer: Remington
- Produced: 1957–present
- Variants: .280 Ackley Improved

Specifications
- Parent case: .30-06 Springfield
- Case type: Rimless, bottleneck
- Bullet diameter: .284 in (7.2 mm)
- Neck diameter: .315 in (8.0 mm)
- Shoulder diameter: .441 in (11.2 mm)
- Base diameter: .470 in (11.9 mm)
- Rim diameter: .473 in (12.0 mm)
- Case length: 2.540 in (64.5 mm)
- Overall length: 3.330 in (84.6 mm)
- Case capacity: 67.9 gr H_{2}O (4.40 cm^{3})
- Rifling twist: 1 in 10 in (250 mm)
- Primer type: Large rifle
- Maximum pressure (C.I.P.): 58,740 psi (405.0 MPa)
- Maximum pressure (SAAMI): 60,000 psi (410 MPa)
- Maximum CUP: 50,000 CUP

Ballistic performance
Bullet mass/type	Velocity	Energy
120 gr (8 g) SP	3,112 ft/s (949 m/s)	2,581 ft⋅lbf (3,499 J)
140 gr (9 g) HP	2,839 ft/s (865 m/s)	2,506 ft⋅lbf (3,398 J)
154 gr (10 g) SP	2,825 ft/s (861 m/s)	2,730 ft⋅lbf (3,700 J)
168 gr (11 g) HPBT	2,723 ft/s (830 m/s)	2,767 ft⋅lbf (3,752 J)
175 gr (11 g) SP	2,681 ft/s (817 m/s)	2,794 ft⋅lbf (3,788 J)
- Test barrel length: 24 in (610 mm); Source: Accurate Powder

The .280 Remington, also known as the 7mm-06 Remington and 7mm Express Remington, was introduced in 1957 for the Remington model 740, 760, 721, and 725 rifles.

== History ==
Having been released 32 years after the .270 Winchester, it had somewhat unspectacular sales. Remington renamed the cartridge in late 1978 to 7mm-06 Remington. but just before the end of the year, they renamed it again, calling it the 7 mm Express in an attempt to increase sales. This resulted in people confusing it with the 7 mm Remington Magnum, and Remington changed the name back to .280 in 1981. (a true necked down 7mm-30-06 wildcat neck location is 2.149" & the 280 is 2.2")

== Specifications ==
The .280 is based on the 30-06's parent 30-03 (or .270 Winchester - compare at the SAAMI datum line, and identical case length of 2.54 in) case "necked" (wildcat cartridge) to support 7 mm (.284 in) bullets. The shoulder was deliberately moved forward to prevent chambering in a .270 Winchester rifle, as firing a .280 round in a .270 rifle could cause the projectile to get stuck in the barrel or rupture the barrel due to excessive pressure.

== .280 Remington vs .270 Winchester ==
The .280 Remington is capable of generating slightly higher velocities in heavier bullet weights (150 grains and above) than the .270 Winchester due to a marginally greater case capacity. However, the ballistic coefficient of equal-weight bullets favors 6.8mm (.277) caliber bullets over 7mm (.284) bullets of similar design. In the heavier bullets (150 grains and above) of similar design, the .280 Remington has a slight edge in muzzle energy.

With equal-weight bullets of similar design, the .270 Winchester surpasses the .280 Remington's long-range velocity and energy due to the 270's higher ballistic coefficient according to Federal's ammunition catalog. There are also many more factory loads available for the .270 Winchester over the .280 Remington at a lower price point due to the .270's much greater popularity.

Renowned for being a strong advocate of the .270 Winchester, gun writer Jack O'Connor's last rifle was a Ruger M77 restocked by Alvin Biesen but this time chambered in .280 Remington, an example of the regard O'Connor had for the cartridge.

== .280 vs .30-06 ==
The .280 Remington is capable of developing energy nearly equal to the .30-06 Springfield, but with lighter bullets having a better ballistic coefficient. The .30-06 produces more energy than the .280 with bullets heavier than 180 grains, though .284" 175-grain bullets have a high sectional density of .310, compared to the 30-06 180-grain bullet with a moderate sectional density of .271. The .280 is suitable for hunting any game in North America with good shot placement.

SAAMI pressure limit for the .280 Remington is set at 60,000 PSI, 50,000 CUP.

Most American rifle and ammunition manufacturers catalogue the .280 Remington.

The .30-06 is substantially more popular and manufacturers thus offer a much greater selection of loads at a substantially lower price point.

While it is true that a .280 Remington case can be formed from a .30-06 Springfield case, the case length of a .30-06 is 63.3 millimetres (2.494 in) while the case length of a .280 is 64.5 millimetres (2.540 in), the same as a .30-03 Springfield. However, resized cases often stretch making up the difference in length and "The slight difference in length of reformed cases doesn't make any practical difference."

== .280 Ackley Improved ==
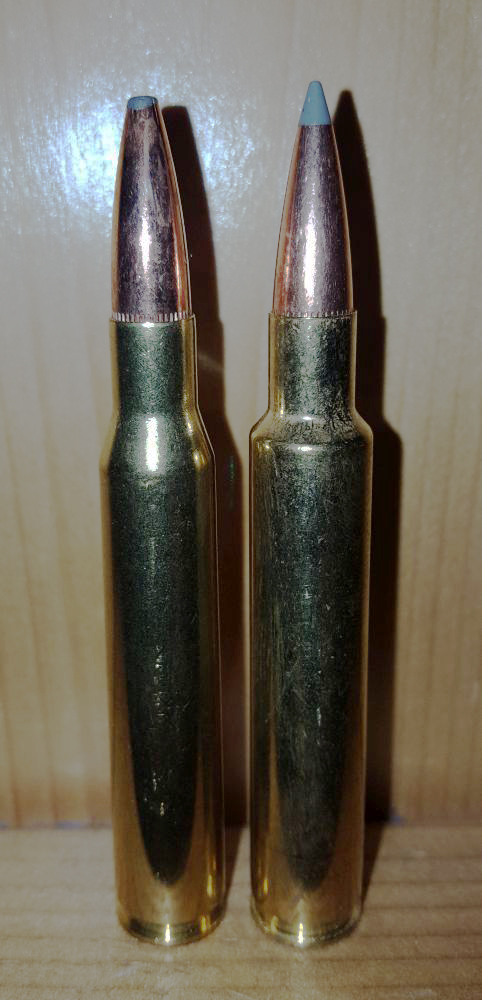
.280 Ackley Improved on the right, with .280 Remington

The .280 Ackley Improved (.280 AI) was the result of the .280 Remington case modification by P.O Ackley, who pushed out the sidewalls at the shoulder to near parallel and steepened the shoulder angle to 40 degrees in order to increase powder capacity, thus along with increasing the allowable pressure, resulted in increasing the bullet initial velocity by approximately 100 fps.

== See also ==
- 7mm Weatherby Magnum
- 7mm-08 Remington
- 7×57mm Mauser
- 7mm Remington Magnum
- 7×64mm
- 7 mm caliber
- List of rifle cartridges
- Table of handgun and rifle cartridges
- Delta L problem
- Sectional density
- Ballistic coefficient
- 7mm-06
- .280 British
- .280 Ackley Improved
