= .243 Winchester =

Rifle cartridge

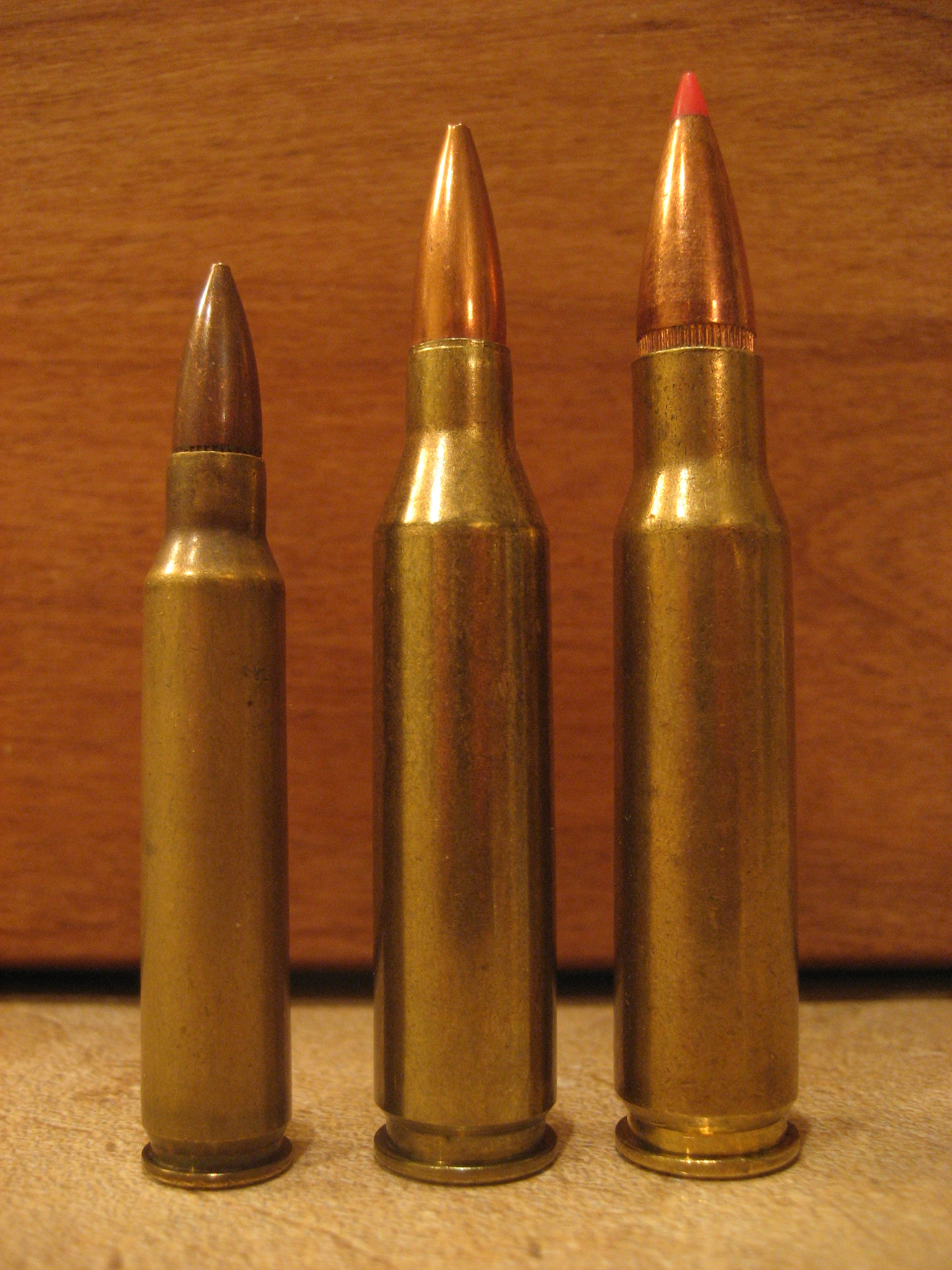
- A .243 Winchester cartridge (middle) next to a .223 Remington (left) and .308 Winchester (right)
- Type: Rifle
- Place of origin: United States

Production history
- Designer: Winchester
- Designed: 1952–1955
- Manufacturer: Winchester
- Produced: 1955–present
- Variants: .243 Winchester Improved (Ackley)

Specifications
- Parent case: .308 Winchester
- Case type: Bottlenecked
- Bullet diameter: .243 in (6.2 mm)
- Land diameter: .237 in (6.0 mm)
- Neck diameter: .276 in (7.0 mm)
- Shoulder diameter: .454 in (11.5 mm)
- Base diameter: .471 in (12.0 mm)
- Rim diameter: .473 in (12.0 mm)
- Case length: 2.045 in (51.9 mm)
- Overall length: 2.7098 in (68.83 mm)
- Case capacity: 53.7–54.8
- Rifling twist: 1-10 in (250 mm) to 1-8 in (200 mm)
- Primer type: Large Rifle
- Maximum pressure (C.I.P.): 60,191 psi (415.00 MPa)
- Maximum pressure (SAAMI): 60,000 psi (410 MPa)

Ballistic performance
Bullet mass/type	Velocity	Energy
58 gr (4 g) V-MAX	3,925 ft/s (1,196 m/s)	1,984 ft⋅lbf (2,690 J)
80 gr (5 g) TTSX	3,350 ft/s (1,020 m/s)	1,994 ft⋅lbf (2,704 J)
85 gr (6 g) TSX	3,200 ft/s (980 m/s)	1,933 ft⋅lbf (2,621 J)
95 gr (6 g) SP	2,980 ft/s (910 m/s)	1,873 ft⋅lbf (2,539 J)
100 gr (6 g) BTSP	2,960 ft/s (900 m/s)	1,945 ft⋅lbf (2,637 J)
- Test barrel length: 24 in (610 mm); Sources: Barnes, Federal, Hornady factory specifications, AccurateShooter.com

The .243 Winchester (6×52mm) is a popular sporting rifle cartridge. Developed as a versatile short action cartridge to hunt both medium game and small game alike, it "took whitetail hunting by storm" when introduced in 1955, and remains one of the most popular whitetail deer cartridges. It is also commonly used for harvesting blacktail deer, pronghorns and mule deer with heavier rounds, and is equally suited to varmint hunting with lighter rounds. The .243 is based on a necked down .308 Winchester, introduced only three years earlier. Expanding monolithic copper bullets of approximately 80 to 85 grains or traditional lead rounds of 90 to 105 grains with controlled expansion designs are best suited for hunting medium game, while lighter rounds are intended for varmints.

In at least ten U.S. states and the United Kingdom, the .243 or similar cartridges are the smallest bore cartridges that are legal for hunting deer; this has been revised in the UK to allow Muntjac and Chinese Water Deer to be taken with .22 (5.56mm) chambered weapons. The cartridge can be extremely accurate to 300 yards (270 m) and beyond, but may not retain enough terminal energy to reliably drop medium game at that distance. Highly experienced hunters use the .243 Winchester to routinely drop bucks up to 250 pounds (110 kg), while less experienced hunters can be just as capable with the .243 because of its very low recoil yet high velocity. Besides hunting applications, the cartridge is popular with target and metallic silhouette shooters for those same recoil and velocity properties, with superb accuracy.

The .243 Winchester has regularly made the top five of rankings for "Best Whitetail Deer Hunting Cartridges" from sources such as Field and Stream and Outdoor Life, and its widespread popularity (called the "whitetail hunter's favorite" by the Browning Arms Company and "American favorite" by American Rifleman) assures chamberings in newly manufactured offerings of not only bolt-action rifles, but also semiautomatic rifles (e.g., Browning BAR and AR-10 platforms), lever action rifles (e.g., Henry Long Ranger and Browning BLR), and even pump action rifles (e.g., Remington 7600). Gun Digest estimates that (as of the end of 2018) the .243 Winchester is the second-most popular of all hunting rifle chamberings (after the long action .30-06).

== History ==
Field and Stream editor and Harvard-educated technical gun enthusiast Warren Page began experimenting with wildcatting a .243 caliber (6.2mm) round in the 1940s sometime after the 6mm Lee Navy was discontinued. When the .308 Winchester was introduced in 1952, Page started necking down the .308 design into a new .243 wildcat cartridge. After Page's hunting success with and much writing about this new version, Winchester developed a factory loaded .243 soon thereafter. It was first introduced in 1955 for the Winchester Model 70 bolt-action and Model 88 lever-action sporting rifles and quickly gained popularity among sportsmen worldwide.

It was a ground-breaking development with at first only two factory loads, combining a versatile and effective combination of 80-grain bullets optimized for high-velocity, long-range performance for varmint hunters (e.g., groundhogs, coyotes, prairie dogs) and 100-grain bullets suitable for game up to the size of deer and pronghorn antelope. Its predecessor in the Winchester lineup, the very similar .257 Roberts, could have easily been selected to accomplish the same tasks, but was not available factory loaded with either lighter, varmint-weight bullets or pointed, long range spitzer bullets, so it never achieved the popularity of the newer round.

Remington also saw the 6 mm (.243 in) family as suitable for this dual-purpose use and introduced their version, the .244 Remington, in the same year (1955) based upon the .257 Roberts necked down to accept .243 bullets up to 90 grains in weight. The Winchester round remains available today whereas the .244 Remington, later renamed the 6mm Remington with the introduction of 100-grain bullets, is far less popular even though it can push all bullet weights slightly faster with maximum loads due to the larger capacity case. The fact that the .243 Win was originally offered in a 1 in 10 inch rifling twist rate, a rate better able to stabilize heavier, 100- and 105-grain bullets, versus the .244 Remington's 1 in 12 inch twist (hence the 90-grain factory offering) was also a factor in their popularity.

Since the enactment of the Deer Act 1963 in the United Kingdom, which stipulates a minimum bullet diameter of .240 inches, together with minimum levels of muzzle velocity and bullet energy, the .243 has long been perceived as the entry-level caliber for legal deer-stalking. Firearms that would normally be chambered in .308 Winchester/7.62×51mm NATO are sometimes available in .243 in countries–such as Spain–whose regulations restrict or forbid private ownership of so-called military calibers (restricted to bolt action-repeating rifles). No military is known to currently designate this round for service.

In a non-sporting context, bolt-action rifles chambered for the .243 were utilized by the Los Angeles Police Department's special weapons and tactics (SWAT) unit during its early years. A specialist 115-grain projectile can move up to 3,150 fps from a 28-inch barrel, or over 3,000 fps from a 26-inch barrel.

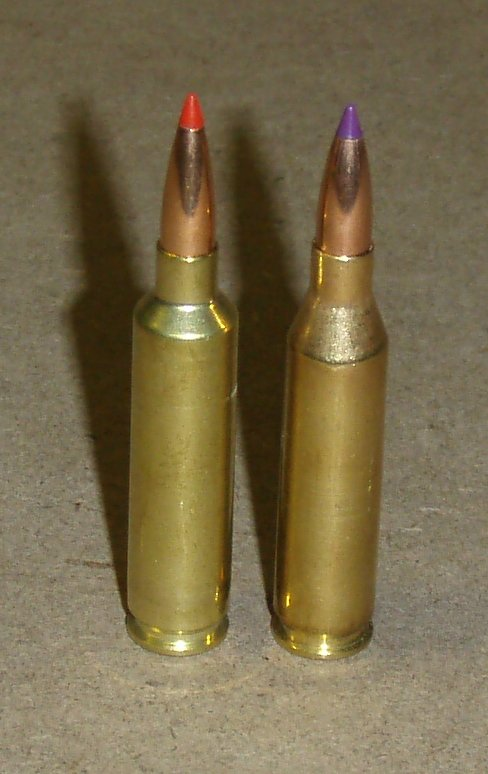
.243 Ackley Improved (left) and .243 Win

P. O. Ackley created an improved version of this cartridge called the .243 Winchester Improved (Ackley). Like other improved cartridges, this created a steeper shoulder and blew the sides out, giving about 10% more powder capacity, and some small improvement in velocity.

== Performance ==
Performance-wise, the .243 Winchester closely matches the 6mm Creedmoor but the .243 Win has more bullet and casing options, as well as more factory loadings and firearm options available. The .243 Win also has slightly more powder room, while the 6mm Creedmoor is usually loaded to slightly higher pressures.

With very little recoil, even less than that of the .30-30 Winchester cartridge introduced sixty years earlier, the .243 brought higher chamber pressures, larger powder volumes, and sharply tipped bullets, which all combine to lend the .243 more muzzle energy and far greater downrange energy than the .30-30 is able to achieve. The .243 Winchester has also been found to shoot flatter and more accurately than the 7mm-08 Remington out to 500 yards, with less recoil yet also less terminal energy.

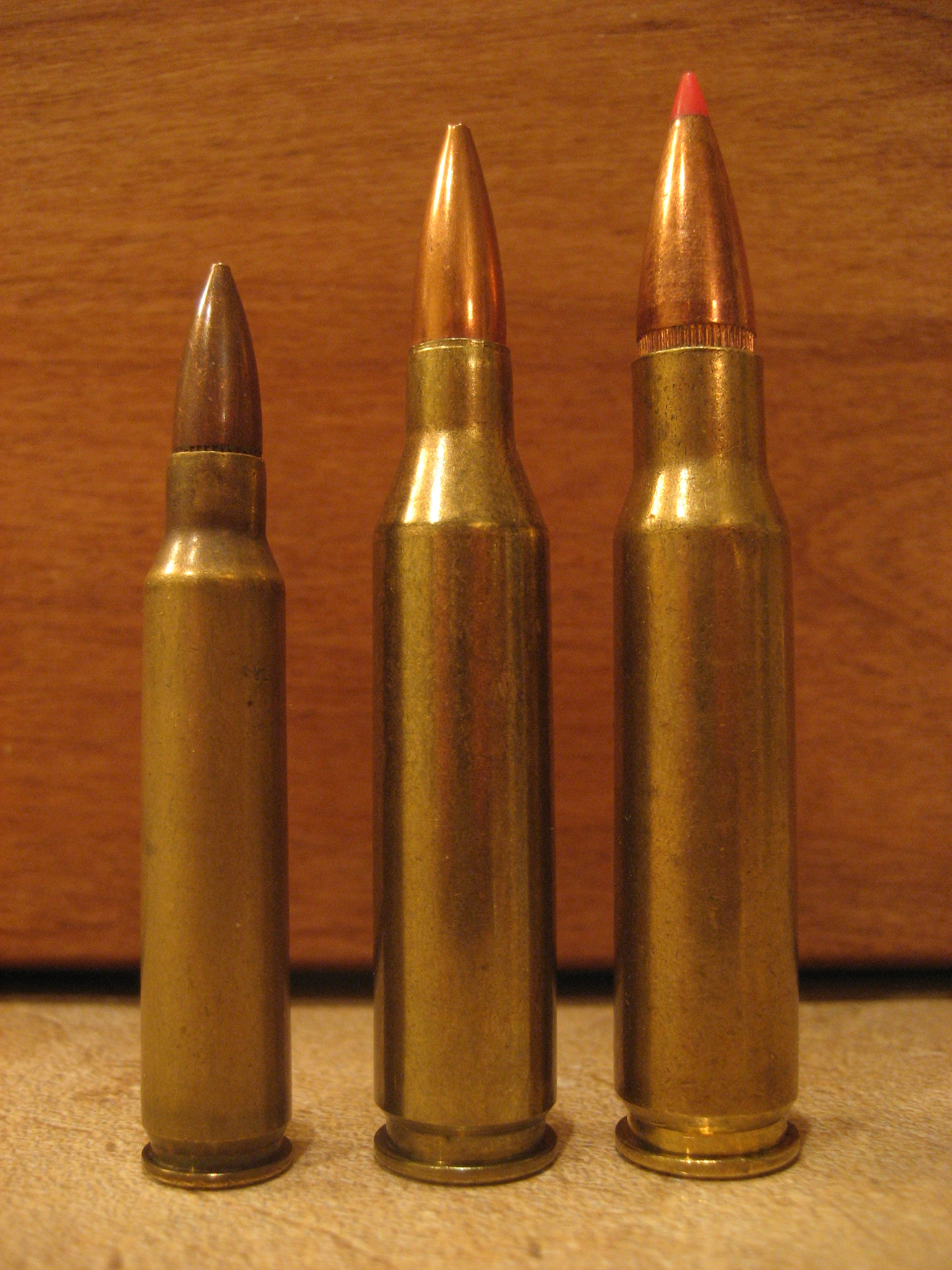
(Left to right) .223 Rem, .243 Win, .308 Win

The recoil has been measured to be so light that it "can be shot by anyone that can handle a rifle." Among popular small-bore rifle ammunition the .243 does have approximately three times the recoil factor of the .223 Remington and twice the recoil factor of the .22-250 Remington, but only half the recoil factor of the more powerful long action .25-06 Remington (without muzzle brakes). As the .223 and .22-250 are not recommended for deer hunting, the .243 has the lowest recoil factor among small bore deer hunting cartridges.

Lack of overpenetration on medium game has traditionally been perceived either as a problem (lack of exit wounds and blood trails) or as a feature ("uses up all the energy in the deer") of traditional lead .243 cartridges versus larger and heavier rounds, but monolithic copper .243 ammunition weighing as little as 80 grains (5.2 g) negates this characteristic and causes adequate penetration and blood trails through even larger-bodied medium game like wild hogs.

The .243 produces a velocity of 3,200 feet (980 m) per second from factory-loaded expanding monolithic copper projectiles weighing 85 grains (5.5 g) fired from a 24-inch (610 mm) barrel. Other variations of commercially loaded .243 ammunition are available with bullet weights ranging from 55 grains (3.6 g) up to 115 grains (6.8 g). Twist rate of the barrel can sometimes be a factor in deciding which bullets to use, 1:10 being the most popular as it is sufficient to stabilize up to 100 gr bullets. However, for very low drag-profile or bullets heavier than 100 gr, a 1:8 or 1:7 (for 115 gr VLD bullets) is necessary.

Some 243 Winchester cartridges (circle size proportional to recoil)
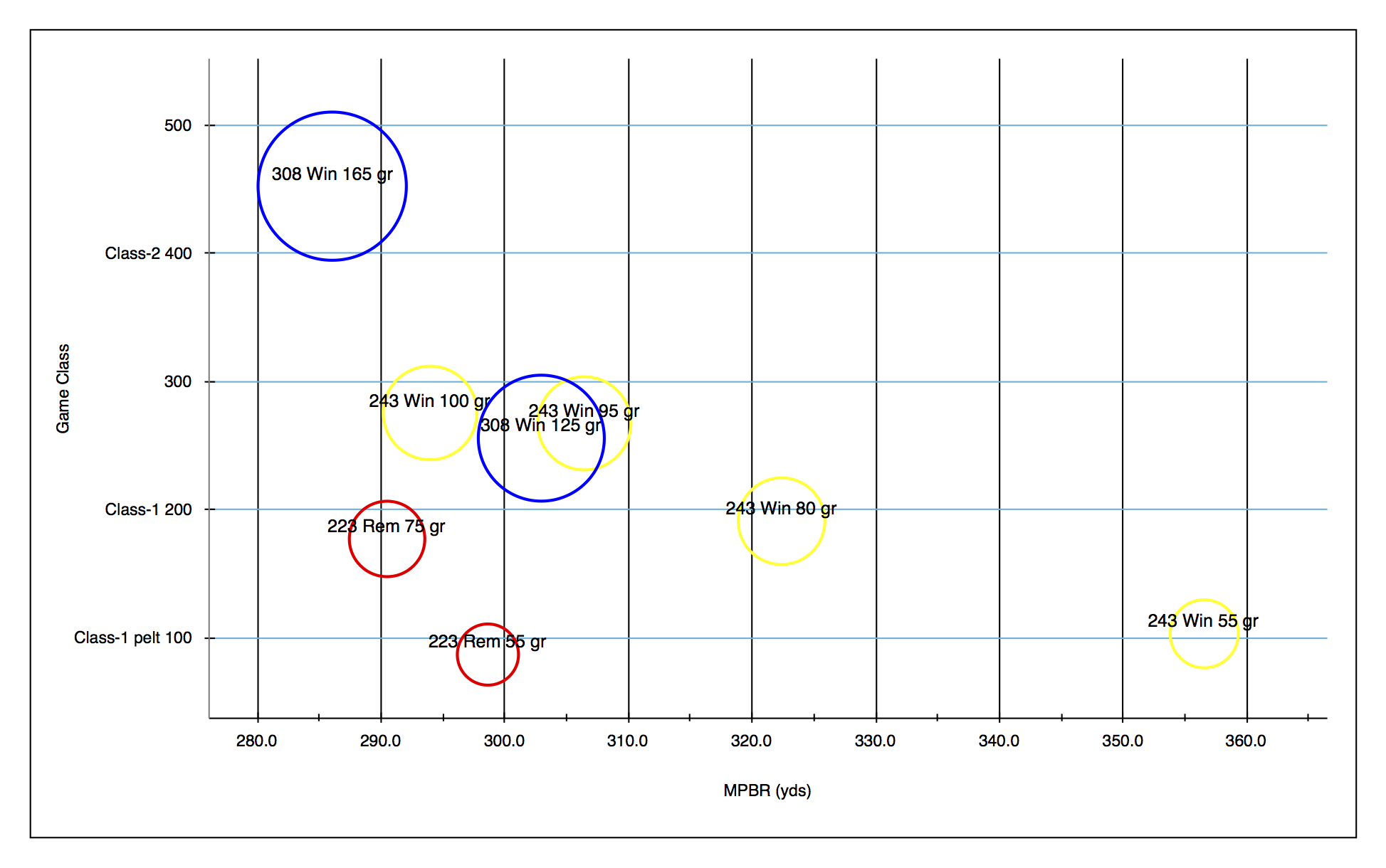
Game class vs 6 in maximum point blank range

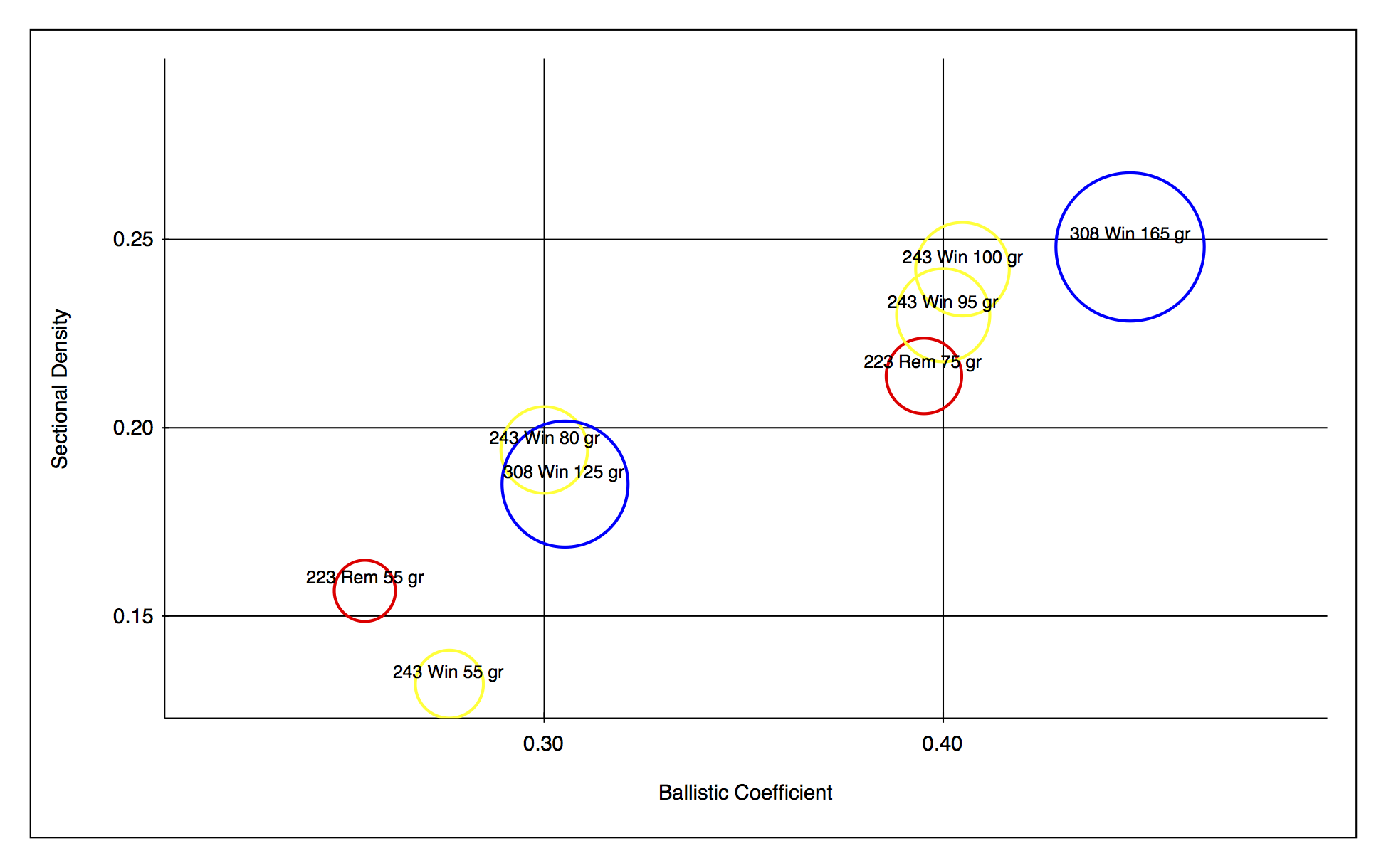
Sectional density vs ballistic coefficient

== Platforms ==
Manufacturer	Model	Type	Country
Chattahoochee Munitions	CM10	Semi-automatic rifle	United States

== See also ==
- .22 CHeetah
- .243 Winchester Super Short Magnum
- .308 Winchester
- 6 mm caliber
- 6mm Remington
- Delta L problem
- List of firearms
- List of rifle cartridges
- Sectional density
- Table of handgun and rifle cartridges
