= ROF Radway Green =

Arms factory in the UK

Coordinates: 53.086473°N 2.326934°W

BAE Systems Radway Green previously known as Royal Ordnance Factory (ROF), Radway Green manufactures small arms ammunition for the British armed forces. It is located in the hamlet of Radway Green near Alsager in Cheshire in the UK.

== History ==
The Royal Ordnance Factory was established in 1940 to produce ammunition, and was acquired by BAE Systems Global Combat Systems in 1987.

On the 20 August 2008 the Ministry of Defence announced a £2bn contract with BAE Systems to supply British forces with small arms and medium calibre ammunition, guaranteeing production at the Radway Green site until at least 2023.

The plant was redeveloped in 2011 by BAE Systems at a cost of £83m. The manufacturing facility, then owned by Crewe Assets, was let to BAE Systems until 2036.

In 2017, Crewe Assets sold the site to a consortium of Korean institutional investors for £56m.

In July 2020, plans were submitted to build new warehouses on land adjacent to the manufacturing facility.

=== Thefts from factory ===
On 21 January 1985 a former quality controller at the factory was sentenced to six years imprisonment after pleading guilty to conspiracy to steal, three charges of theft and asking for eight other offences to be taken into consideration. After the thefts were discovered, it took a team of four Ministry of Defence Police officers a fortnight to recover around £26,000 worth of goods stolen from the factory (which included a rocket launcher) from the man's house in nearby Alsager. The man's son, an apprentice at the factory, "resigned in disgrace", but charges were left on file, and he was not prosecuted. The thefts were believed to date back at least ten years, and the prosecution stated that there was some evidence that the man had also stolen from ROF Chorley when he was based there. In the wake of the thefts, security was tightened across all Royal Ordnance Factories.

== Manufacturing operations ==
The facility has manufactured a wide range of ammunition, including:

- .38 S&W - (Mk IIz ball) - [production ended in 1960s]
- .303 British - (ball, blank, tracer, incendiary, armour piercing and proof testing) - [production ended in 1973]
- .280 British - ('7 mm Mk 1z' - small amounts for developmental purposes of the Enfield EM2 and Taden gun in the 1950s) - [production ended circa 1956]
- 4.85×49mm - (small amounts for developmental purposes of the L64/65 in the 1970s)
- 9×19mm NATO - (standard FMJ, starting in the Second World War and still in production). 9mm 1Z ammunition was superseded in March 1944 by the more powerful 2Z cartridge.
- 5.56×45mm NATO - (standard FMJ, tracer and blank ammunition)
- 7.62×51mm NATO - (standard L44A1 FMJ [plus "Green Spot" and L42A1 for sniper use], tracer and blank ammunition) - [production of 7.62mm started in late 1953]
- 4.6×30mm - (standard FMJ) for the Heckler & Koch MP7

All ammunition currently produced at Radway Green is NATO certified i.e. bears the NATO roundel as part of the headstamp on the cartridge case surrounding the primer. Additionally, headstamps bear the ammunition type ID, the initials "RG" plus the year of production e.g. "L18A1 RG 11" for 5.56×45mm blank cartridges manufactured at Radway Green in 2011. Headstamps on cartridges manufactured during the Second World War and in pre-NATO years bear the initials "RG", the ammunition type, plus the year of production and the broad arrow to signify Ministry of Defence property. For example, 9mm ammunition manufactured at Radway Green in 1943 would be stamped "RG 43 9M/M 1Z" plus the broad arrow.

The ordnance factory has its own firing range on-site, where batches of ammunition are periodically test-fired from a variety of different weapons. The intention of test-firing is to check for proper function and performance within contract requirements such as reliability, consistency (e.g. velocity tested via gun chronograph) and accuracy at various distances from the muzzle etc.

A private, dedicated spur once led off the main former London, Midland and Scottish Railway railway line to facilitate transfer of coal and other raw materials inwards and the final product outbound.
