= BSA 28P =

British assault rifle

- Type: Assault rifle
- Place of origin: United Kingdom

Production history
- Designer: Claude Perry; Roger Wackrow
- Designed: 1949–50
- Manufacturer: Birmingham Small Arms Company
- No. built: 12/15

Specifications
- Mass: 9.4 lb (4.3 kg)
- Length: 42 in (1,100 mm)
- Barrel length: 20 in (510 mm)
- Cartridge: .280 British
- Action: Gas-operated
- Feed system: 15-round detachable box magazine
- Sights: Optical

The BSA Model 28P is an assault rifle of British origin. The weapon was considered to replace the .303 Lee–Enfield after 1945. However, the BSA 28P was outdated compared to its rival, the EM-2 and the L1A1 SLR asides the 7.62 NATO calibre. The 28P rifle was tested during the summer of 1950 at Enfield but was not particularly accurate. An explosion in the breech showed a fault and although a revised variant subsequently performed well, the project was abandoned.

One unit of the Model 28P is present at the Imperial War Museum.

== Overview ==
The Model 28P is gas operated, locked placing breech block into the left of the receiver. It has a squared receiver with an integral optical sight and pistol gripped half stock. The trigger section with a rack and pinion and weight device to slow its rate of fire with its radial lever selector marked A for full auto, R for single shot and S for safety, on the left side of the stock alongside the receiver. Rifling came with 5 grooves right hand. The flash hider came as a grenade launcher and could use a bayonet No5 Pattern.

== See also ==
- British military rifles
- List of assault rifles
