= L64 =

L64 may refer to:

- The tactical numbering of the Zeppelin LZ 109
- The L64/65 British assault rifle
- The FAA identifier for Desert Center Airport
