= EM4 =

EM4 may refer to:

- EM4 Electric Trainset, a Russian multiple unit train carriage
- EM-4 rifle, an experimental British rifle
- ARC EM4, a model of ARC embedded microprocessor manufactured by the US company Synopsis
- EM-4, a model of farm tractor manufactured by the Greek company Malkotsis
- EM-4, a model of electric mandolin manufactured by the Mid-Missouri Mandolin Company
- EM4 (tube), a designation for a vacuum tube, of dual-sensitivity, Magic Eye type
