= British military rifles =

Rifles used by the British Armed Forces

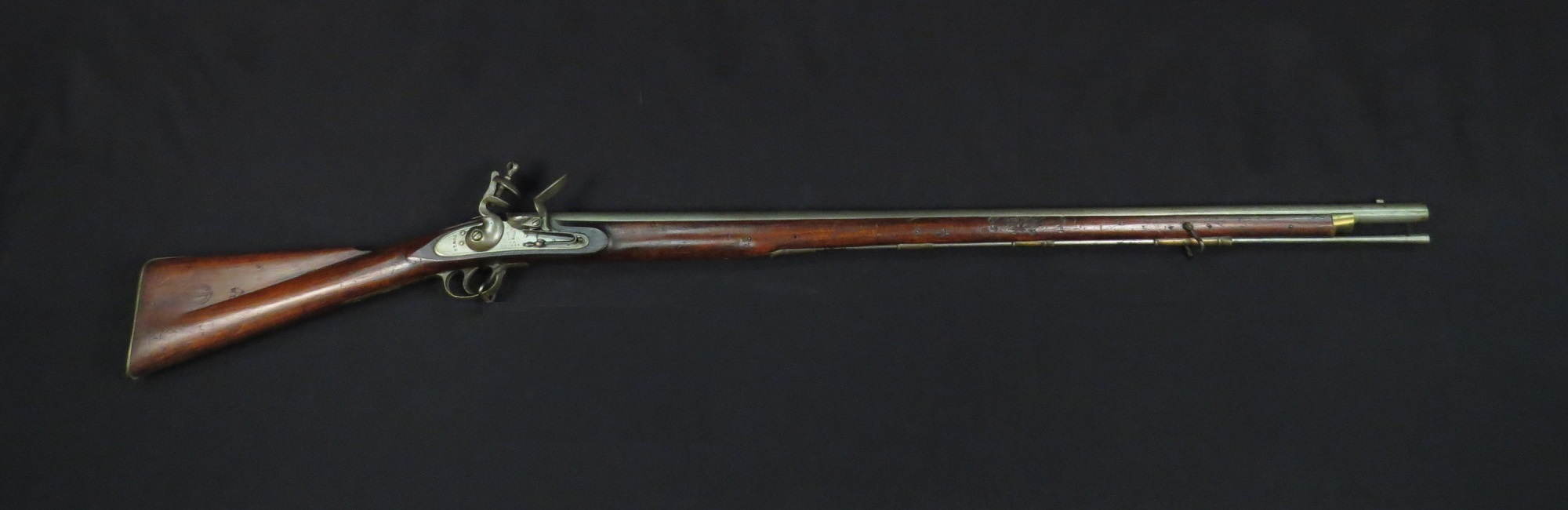
Brown Bess musket – precursor to the early British rifles

The origins of the modern British military rifle are within its predecessor, the Brown Bess musket. While a musket was largely inaccurate over 100 yards (91 m), due to a lack of rifling and a generous tolerance to allow for muzzle-loading, it was cheap to produce and could be loaded quickly. The use of volley or mass firing by troops meant that the rate of fire took precedence over accuracy.

Beginning in the late 1830s, the superior performance of the new rifles led the British military to phase out the venerable .75 calibre Brown Bess musket in favour of smaller-calibre muzzle-loading rifles. Early rifles were non-standard and often used components from the Brown Bess, including locks and stocks adapted to new rifled barrels. It was not until the late 19th century that the rifle fully supplanted the musket as the weapon of the infantryman.

== Rifles before 1800 ==
Civilian rifles had on rare occasions been used by marksmen during the English Civil War (1642–51). In the 1750s, a few German rifles were used by British light infantry regiments in the Seven Years' War.

=== Pattern 1776 infantry rifle ===
Pattern 1776 rifle

In January 1776, 1,000 rifles were ordered to be built for the British Army. A pattern by gunsmith William Grice, based on German rifles in use by the British Army, was approved for official issue as the Pattern 1776 Infantry Rifle. This weapon was issued to the light company of each regiment in the British Army during the American Revolution; these were probably present at most battles in the conflict in the American Revolution.

=== Ferguson rifle ===
Ferguson rifle

Also in 1776, Major Patrick Ferguson patented his breech-loading Ferguson rifle, based on old French and Dutch designs of the 1720s and 1730s. One hundred of these, of the two hundred or so made, were issued to a special rifle corps in 1777, but the cost, production difficulties and fragility of the guns, coupled with the death of Ferguson at the Battle of Kings Mountain meant the experiment was short-lived.

== Baker rifle ==
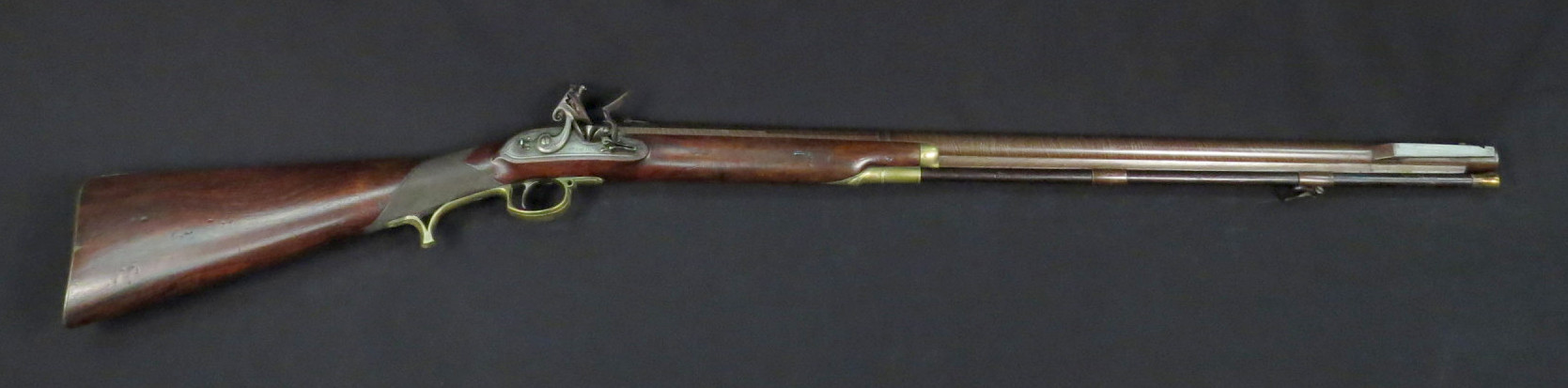
Baker rifle

The Baker rifle was a muzzle-loading flintlock weapon used by the British Army in the Napoleonic Wars, notably by the 95th Rifles and the 5th Battalion, 60th Regiment of Foot. This rifle was an accurate weapon for its day, with reported kills being made at 100 to 300 yards (90 to 270 m) away. At Cacabelos, in 1809, Rifleman Tom Plunkett, of the 95th, shot the French General Colbert-Chabanais at a range allegedly of 400 yards (370 m). The rifle was in service in the British Army until the 1840s. The Mexican Army, under Santa Anna, used British Baker Rifles during the 1836 Texas-Mexican War.

== Brunswick rifle ==
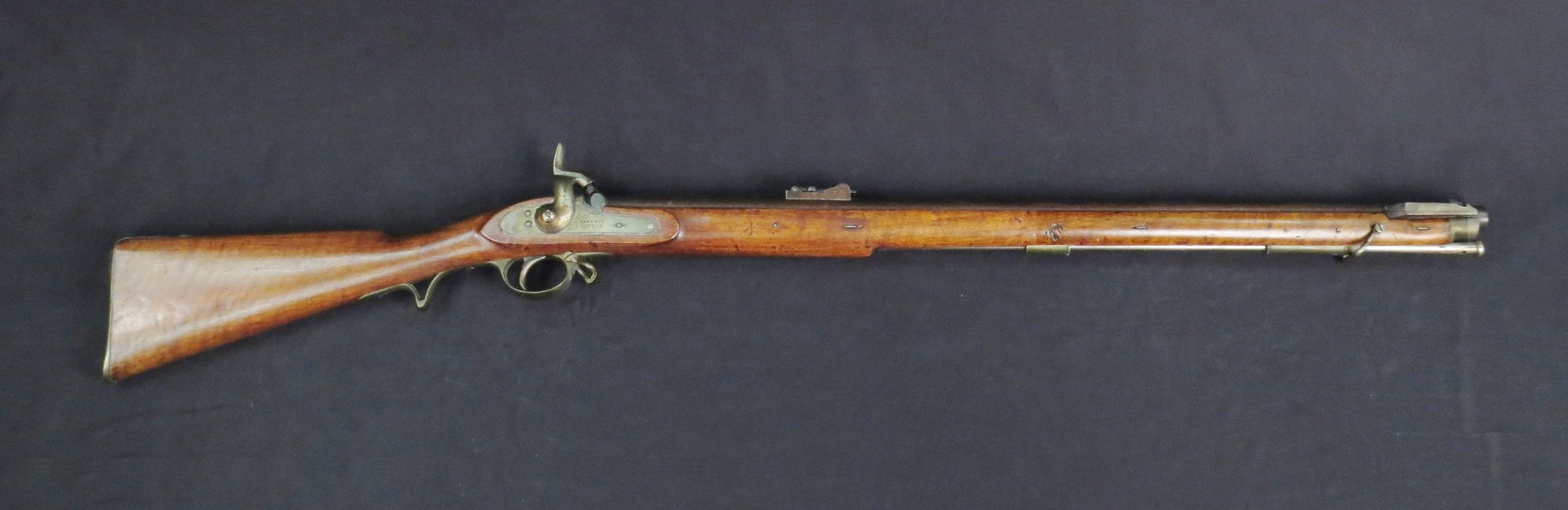
Barnett London Brunswick-style Percussion Rifle

The Brunswick rifle was a .704 calibre muzzle-loading percussion rifle manufactured for the British Army at the Royal Small Arms Factory at Enfield in the early 19th century. The weapon was introduced to replace the Baker rifle and weighed from over 9 and 10 pounds (4.1 and 4.5 kg) without its bayonet attached, depending on the pattern. The weapon was difficult to load but remained in production for about 50 years (1836 to 1885) and was used in both the United Kingdom and assorted colonies and outposts throughout the world.

The Brunswick had a two-groove barrel designed to accept a "belted" round ball. There are four basic variants of the British Brunswick Rifle (produced in .654 and .704 calibre, both oval-bore rifled and smoothbore). They are the Pattern 1836, the Pattern 1841, the Pattern 1848 and the Pattern 1840 Variant.

== Early Enfield rifles ==
Throughout the evolution of the British rifle, the name Enfield is prevalent; this refers to the Royal Small Arms Factory in the town (now suburb) of Enfield, north of London, where the British Government produced various patterns of muskets from components manufactured elsewhere beginning in 1804. The first rifle produced in whole to a set pattern at Enfield was the Baker rifle. Brunswick rifles were also produced there, but, prior to 1851, rifles were considered speciality weapons and served alongside the muskets, which were issued to regular troops.

=== Pattern 1851 ===
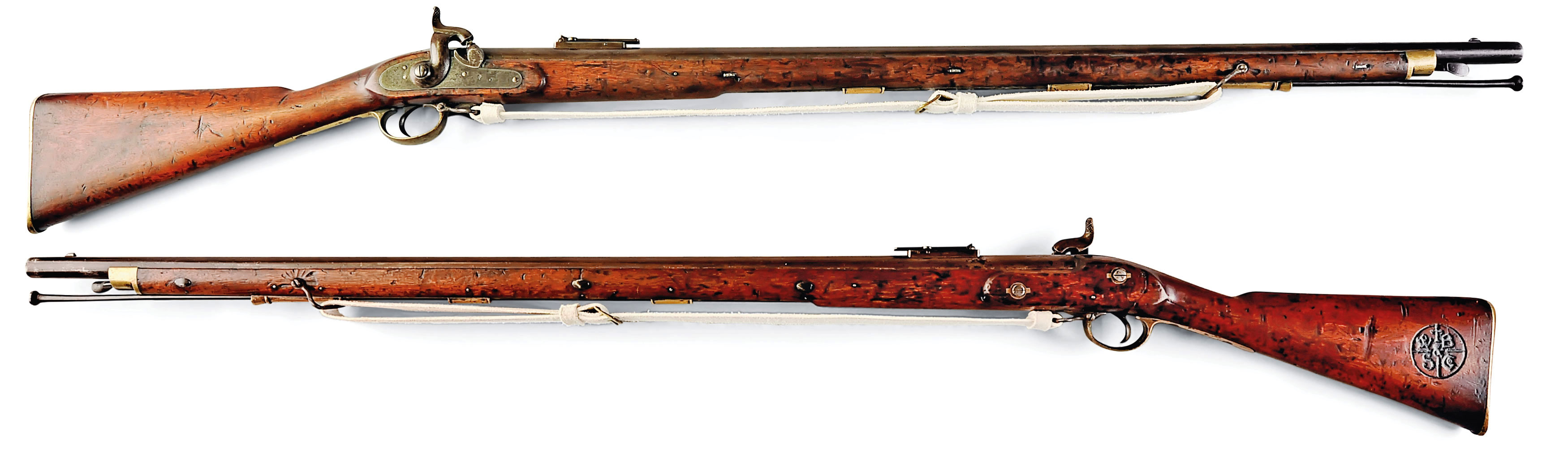
Pattern 1851 Enfield

In 1851, the Enfield factory embarked upon production of the .702-inch [17.8 mm] Pattern 1851 Minié rifle using the conical Minie bullet, which replaced the Pattern 1842 .753 calibre smoothbore musket as the primary weapon issued to regular troops. The Pattern 1851 was referred to as a rifled musket and was longer than previous production rifles, conforming to the length of prior muskets, which allowed for consistency in standards for firing in ranks and bayonet combat. Relatively few of these were produced since a new design was adopted within two years. The rifle used the lock and bayonet mount from the Pattern 1842, with a 39-inch (990 mm) barrel.

The new Minie ammunition allowed much faster loading, so that rifles were no longer slower to load than smoothbore muskets. Previous rifles, such as the Baker and the Brunswick, were designated for special troops, such as skirmishers or snipers, while the majority of shoulder-arms remained smoothbore muskets.

=== Pattern 1853 ===
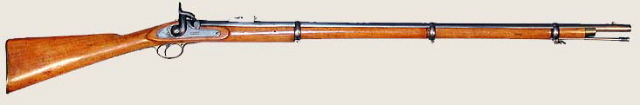
Pattern 1853 Enfield

The Pattern 1853 Enfield used a smaller .577 calibre Minie bullet. Several variations were made, including infantry, navy and artillery versions, along with shorter carbines for cavalry use. The Pattern 1851 and Pattern 1853 were both used in the Crimean War, with some logistical confusion caused by the need for different ammunition. The Pattern 1853 was popular with both sides of the American Civil War; the Confederacy and the Union imported these through agents who contracted with private companies in Britain for production.

=== Pattern 1858 ===
The Pattern 1858 naval rifle was developed for the British Admiralty in the late 1850s with a heavier 5-grooved barrel. The heavier barrel was designed to withstand the leverage from the naval cutlass bayonet but may have contributed to accuracy.

=== Pattern 1858 Indian Service ===
There is also the very short-lived Pattern 1858 developed from the Pattern 1853 for Indian service. A consequence of the rebellion, based on British fears, was to modify the native infantry long arms by reaming out the rifling of the Pattern 1853 which greatly reduced the effectiveness, as was replacing the variable distance rear sight with a fixed sight. This became the Pattern 1858, with an increased bore of 0.656" from 0.577" and a thinner barrel wall. Bulging and bursting of the barrel became an issue, as well as excessive flexing when the bayonet was fitted. To remedy this, new barrels were made with a thicker wall and became the Pattern 1859.

=== Pattern 1859 Indian Service (modified) ===
The Indian Service variant became the new standard issue and, when comparing the P1859 with the P1853, side-by-side, the difference would only become apparent if one was to feel just inside the muzzle for the presence of rifling or not. The British retained the superior earlier pattern for their own use.

=== Pattern 1860 ===
The Enfield "Short Rifle" was a percussion rifle used extensively by the North and South in the US Civil War. It was generally well regarded for its accuracy, even with its short barrel. It was also used by the British Army.

=== Pattern 1861 Enfield Musketoon ===
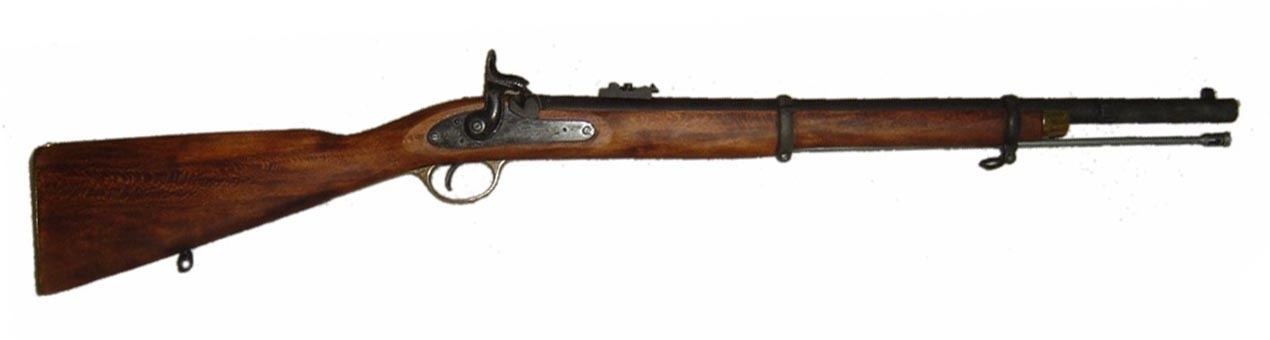
Pattern 1861 Enfield Musketoon

The Pattern 1861 Enfield Musketoon was an alteration to the Pattern 1853 Enfield Musketoon. The alteration gave the Pattern 1861 a faster twist, which gave it more accuracy than the longer Pattern 1853 Enfield rifle. In Britain, it was issued to artillery units, who required a weapon for personal defence. It was imported by the Confederacy and issued to artillery and cavalry units.

== Snider–Enfield rifles ==
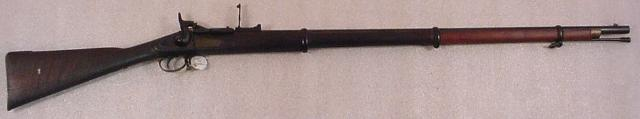
Snider-Enfield rifle

In 1866, the Snider–Enfield was produced as a conversion of Enfield Pattern 1853 with a hinged breechblock and barrel designed for a .577 cartridge. Later Sniders were newly manufactured on the same design.

The action was invented by an American, Jacob Snider, and adopted by Britain as a conversion system for the 1853 Enfield. The conversions proved both more accurate than original muzzle-loading Enfields and much faster firing as well. Converted rifles retained the original iron barrel, furniture, locks and cap-style hammers. The rifles were converted in large numbers, or assembled new with surplus pattern 53 iron barrels and hardware. The Mark III rifles were made from all new parts with steel barrels, flat-nosed hammers and are the version equipped with a latch-locking breech block. The Snider was the subject of substantial imitation, approved and otherwise, including: Nepalese Sniders, the Dutch Sniders, Danish Naval Sniders, and the "unauthorized" adaptations resulting in the French Tabatiere and Russian Krnka rifles.

The Snider–Enfield Infantry rifle was particularly long at over 54 inches (1,400 mm). The breech block housed a diagonally downward-sloping firing pin which was struck with a front-action side-mounted hammer. The firer cocked the hammer, flipped the block out of the receiver with a breech block lever, and then pulled the block back to extract the spent case. There was no ejector, the case had to be pulled out, or more usually, the rifle rolled onto its back to allow the case to fall out. The Snider saw service throughout the British Empire, until it was gradually phased out of front line service in favour of the Martini–Henry, in the mid-1870s. The design continued in use with colonial troops into the 20th century.

== Martini–Henry rifles ==
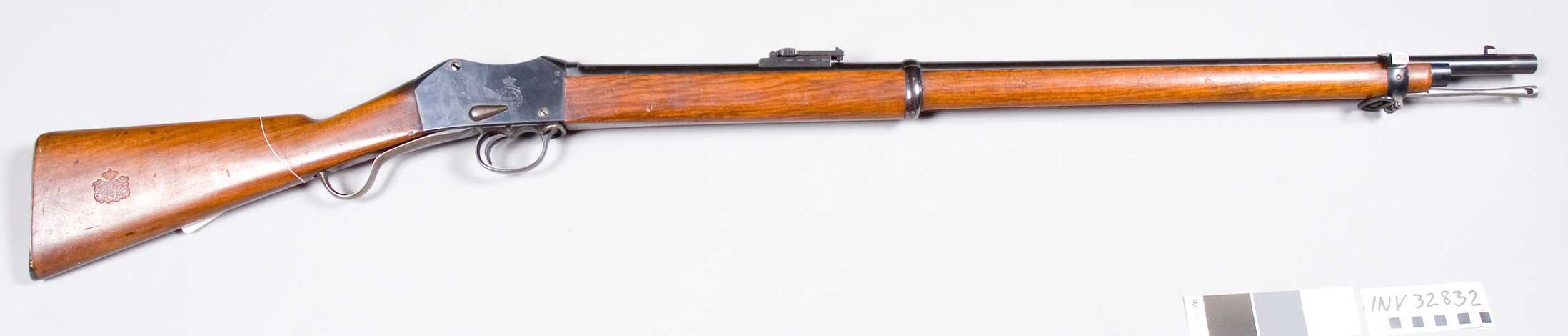
Martini-Henry Model 1879

The Martini–Henry rifle was adopted in 1871, featuring a tilting-block single-shot breech-loading action, actuated by a lever beneath the wrist of the buttstock. The Martini–Henry evolved as the standard service rifle for almost 20 years, with variants including carbines.

Unlike the Snider it replaced, the Martini–Henry was designed from the ground up as a breech-loading metallic cartridge firearm. This robust weapon uses a tilting-block, with a self-cocking, lever operated, single-shot action designed by a Swiss, Friedrich von Martini, as modified from the Peabody design. The rifling system was designed by a Scotsman, Alexander Henry.

The Mark I was adopted for service in 1871. There were three further main variations of the Martini–Henry rifle, the Marks II, III and IV, with sub-variations of these, called patterns. In 1877, a carbine version entered service with five main variations including cavalry and artillery versions. Initially, Martinis used the short chamber Boxer-Henry .45 calibre black powder cartridge made of a thin sheet of brass rolled around a mandrel, which was then soldered to an iron base. Later, the rolled brass case was replaced by a solid brass version which remedied a myriad of problems.

=== Martini–Metford and Martini–Enfield ===
Martini–Enfield rifles were mostly conversions of the Zulu War era .577/450 Martini–Henry, rechambered to the .303 British calibre, although a number were newly manufactured. Early Martini–Henry conversions, began in 1889, using Metford rifled barrels (Martini–Metford rifles), which were more than suitable for the first black powder .303 cartridges, but they wore out very quickly when fired with the more powerful smokeless ammunition introduced in 1895, so that year the Enfield rifled barrel was introduced, which was suitable for smokeless ammunition. The Martini–Enfield was in service from 1895 to 1918 (Lawrence of Arabia's Arab Irregulars were known to have used them during the Arab Revolt of 1916–1918), and it remained a reserve arm in places like India and New Zealand well into World War II.

== Lee–Metford rifles ==
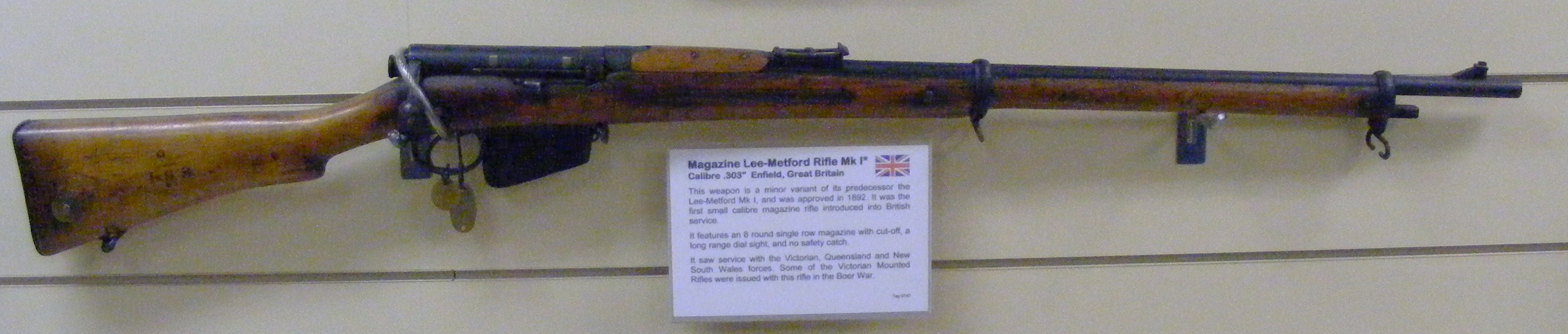
Lee–Metford rifle

The first British repeating rifle incorporated a bolt-action and a box-magazine; this was developed through trials beginning in 1879, and adopted as the Magazine Rifle Mark I in 1888. This rifle is commonly referred to as the Lee–Metford or MLM (Magazine Lee–Metford).

The "Lee" comes from James Paris Lee (1831–1904), a Scottish-born Canadian-American inventor who designed an easy-to-operate turnbolt and a high-capacity box magazine to work with it. The box magazine, either Lee or Mannlicher designed, proved superior in combat to the Kropatschek-style tube magazine used by the French in their Lebel rifle, or the Krag–Jørgensen rotary magazine used in the first US bolt-action rifle (M1892). The initial Lee magazine was a straight stack, eight-round box, which was superseded by the staggered, ten-round box in later versions, in each case more than were accommodated by Mannlicher box magazine designs. The "Metford" comes from William Ellis Metford (1824–1899), an English engineer who was instrumental in perfecting the .303 calibre jacketed bullet and rifling to accommodate the smaller diameter.

During the development of the Lee–Metford, smokeless powder was invented. The French and Germans were already implementing their second-generation bolt-action rifles, the 8 mm Lebel in 1886 and 7.92 mm Gewehr 88 in 1888 respectively, using smokeless powder to propel smaller diameter bullets. The British followed the trend of using smaller diameter bullets, but the Lee–Metford design process overlapped the invention of smokeless powder, and was not adapted for its use. However, in 1895, the design was modified to work with smokeless powder resulting in the Lee–Enfield.

A contrast between this design and other successful bolt actions of the time, such as the Mausers and US Springfield, are the rear locking lugs. This puts the lugs close to the bolt handle, where the pressure is applied by the operator; in essence the force is close to the fulcrum point. Without great explanation, this results in an easier and swifter operation versus the Mauser design, resulting in a greater rate of fire. However, this compromises strength as the fulcrum point has moved away from the force of the explosion, thus making the length of the bolt a lever working against the holding power of the rear lugs. This was a limiting factor in the ballistics capacity of this design.

Another difference between the Lee and the Mauser designs was the use of "cock-on-closing", which also helped to speed cycling by making the initial opening of the breech very easy. The closing stroke, which is generally more forceful than the opening stroke, cocks the rifle, adding to the ease of use. The Lee design also featured a shorter bolt travel and a 60-degree rotation of the bolt; these attributes also led to faster cycle times.

Over the service life of the design, proponents and opponents would stress rate-of-fire versus ballistics respectively. The basic Lee design with some tinkering was the basis for most British front-line rifles until after World War II.

== Lee–Enfield rifles ==
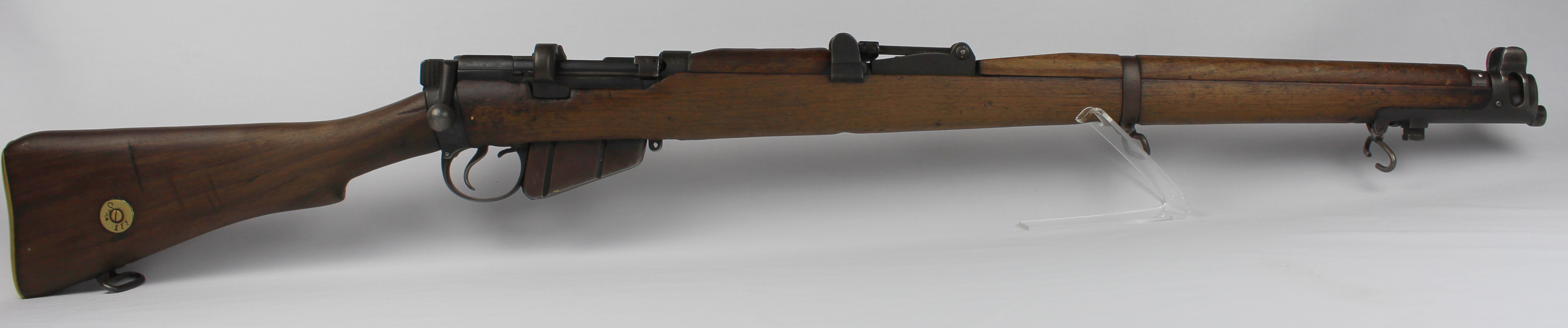
Lee-Enfield rifle

In 1895, the Lee–Metford design was reinforced to accommodate the higher chamber pressures of smokeless powder; more critically, the barrel rifling was changed to one developed by the Enfield factory owing to the incompatibility of the Metford barrel design with smokeless powder (the barrels becoming unusable after fewer than 5,000 rounds). The designation was changed to Rifle, Magazine, Lee–Enfield Mark I or MLE (magazine Lee–Enfield). The sights also had to be changed to reflect the flatter trajectory and longer ranges of the improved cartridge.

The Martini–Henry, Lee–Metford, and Lee–Enfield rifles have an overall length just under 50 inches (1,300 mm). In each case, several variants of carbines were offered in the under 40-inch (1,000 mm) range for uses by cavalry, artillery, constabularies and special troops.

Starting in 1909, MLE and MLM rifles were converted to use charger loading, which was accomplished by modifying the bolt, modifying the front and rear sights, and adding a charger guide bridge to the action body, thereby allowing the use of chargers to more rapidly load the magazines. Upgraded to a more modern standard, these rifles served in combat in the First World War.

=== The Short Magazine Lee–Enfield (SMLE) – also known as rifle No. 1 ===
Before World War I, the Rifle, Short, Magazine Lee–Enfield, or SMLE, was developed to provide a single rifle to offer a compromise length between rifles and carbines, and to incorporate improvements deemed necessary from experience in the Boer War. With a length of 44.5 inches (1,130 mm), the new weapon was referred to as a "short rifle"; the word "short" refers to the length of the rifle, not the length of the magazine. From 1903 to 1909, many Metford and Enfield rifles were converted to the SMLE configuration with shorter barrels and modified furniture. Production of the improved SMLE Mk III began in 1907. Earlier Mk I and Mk II rifles were upgraded to include several of the improvements of the Mk III. The compromise length was consistent with military trends as the US Springfield M1903 was only produced in the compromise length and the Germans adopted the kurz (short) rifle concept between the world wars for the Mauser 98k (model 1898 short).

=== Training Rifle – Rifle, Number 2 ===
To conserve resources in training, the British Army converted many .303 rifles to .22 calibre for target practice and training purposes after the First World War. In 1926, the British government changed the nomenclature of its rifles, designating the .303 calibre SMLE as No. 1 Rifles and the .22 calibre training rifles as No. 2 Rifles. For practical purposes "SMLE" and "No. 1 Rifle" are alternate names for the same weapon, but a purist would define a No. 1 as post-1926 production only.

=== Rifle No. 4 aka the Lee–Enfield rifle ===
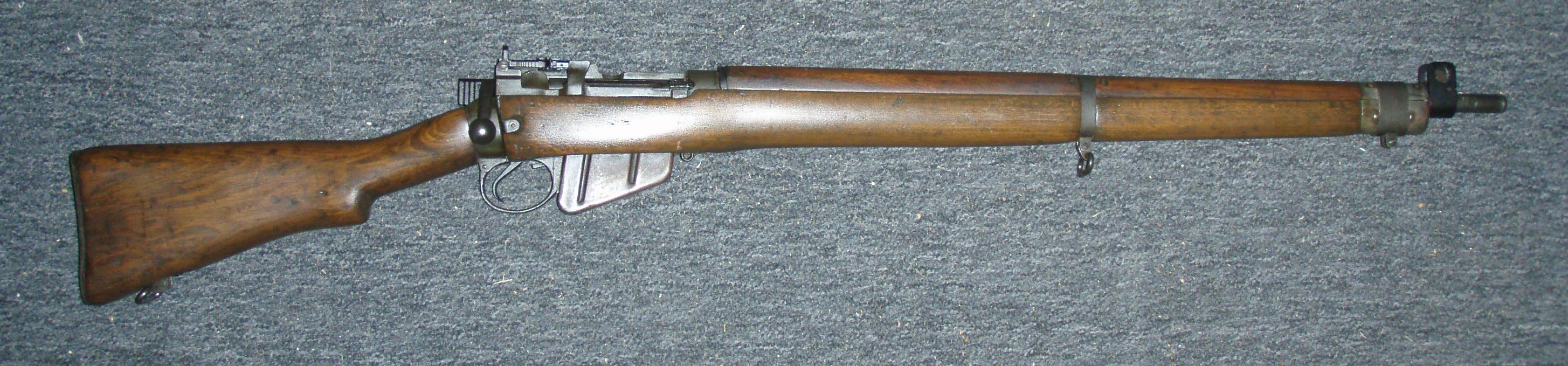
Lee–Enfield No. 4 Mk I*

Beginning shortly after the First World War, the SMLE went through a series of experimental changes that resulted in the Rifle, No. 4 Mk I, which was adopted in 1939, just after the beginning of the Second World War. The changes included receiver-mounted aperture rear sights, similar to that of the Pattern 1914 rifle and changed screw threads, making nearly all threaded components incompatible with those of the SMLE (No. 1) rifle. The No. 4 rifle had a heavier barrel, stronger steel in the action body and bolt body and a short "grip-less" (or "spike") bayonet that mounted directly to the barrel, rather than to a separate nose cap. The latter was the most prominent visual change. Later several models of bladed bayonets were created.

During the Second World War, the British government also contracted with Canadian and US manufacturers (notably Small Arms Limited and Savage) to produce the No. 4 Mk I* rifle. US-manufactured rifles supplied under the Lend Lease program were marked US PROPERTY on the left side of the receiver. Canada's Small Arms Limited at Long Branch made over 900,000. Many of these equipped the Canadian Army and many were supplied to the UK and New Zealand. Over a million No. 4 rifles were built by Stevens-Savage in the United States for the UK between 1941 and 1944 and all were originally marked "U.S. PROPERTY". Canada and the United States manufactured both the No. 4 MK. I and the simplified No. 4 MK. I*. The UK and Canada converted about 26,000 No. 4 rifles to sniper equipment.

The No. 4 rifle has remained on issue until at least 2016 with the Canadian Rangers, still in .303. Some rifles were converted to the NATO 7.62mm calibre for sniping (L42A1) and several versions for target use. L42A1 sniper rifles were used in the 1982 Falklands War.

=== Rifle No. 5 and further variants ===
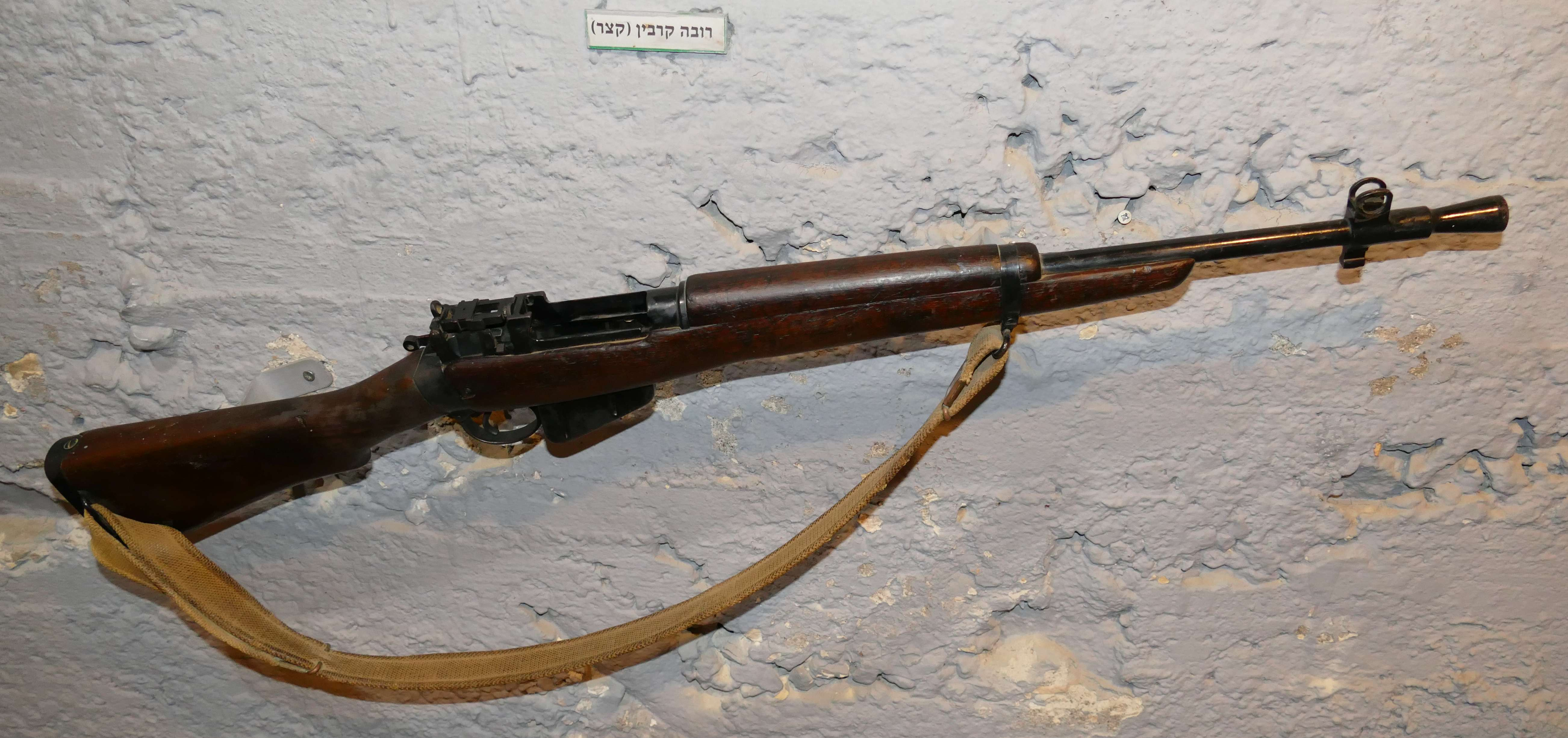
Lee-Enfield No. 5 rifle*

In 1943, trials began on a shortened and lightened No. 4 rifle, leading to the adoption in 1944 of the No. 5 Mk I rifle, or "jungle carbine", as it is commonly known. The No. 5 rifle was manufactured from 1944 until 1947.

The end of the Second World War saw the production of the rifle No. 6, an experimental Australian version of the No. 5, and later the No. 7, No. 8, and No. 9, all of which were .22 rimfire trainers.

Production of SMLE variants continued until circa 1956 and in small quantities for speciality use until circa 1974. In the mid-1960s, a version was produced for the 7.62×51mm NATO cartridge by installing new barrels and new extractors, enlarging the magazine wells slightly, and installing new magazines. This was also done by the Indian rifle factory at Ishapore, which produced a strengthened SMLE in 7.62 mm NATO, as well as .303 SMLEs into the 1980s.

Although Mausers and Springfields were being replaced by semi-automatic rifles during the Second World War, the British did not feel the need to replace the faster firing SMLE weapons with the new technology.

The No. 5 rifle was a favorite among troops serving in the jungles of Malaysia during the Malayan Emergency (1948–1960) due to its handy size, short length and powerful cartridge that was well suited for penetrating barriers and foliage in jungle warfare. The No. 5's extensive use in the Malayan Emergency is where the rifle gained its "jungle carbine" title.

== Pattern 1913 Enfield ==
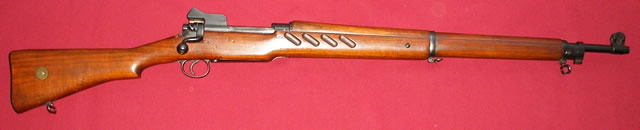
Pattern 1913 Enfield experimental rifle

The Pattern 1913 Enfield (P13) was an experimental rifle developed by the British Army ordnance department to serve as a replacement for the Short Magazine Lee–Enfield (SMLE). Although a completely different design from the Lee–Enfield, the Pattern 1913 rifle was designed by the Enfield engineers. In 1910, the British War Office considered replacing the SMLE based on its inferior performance compared to the Mauser rifles used by the enemy in the Boer War. The major shortcoming was long range performance and accuracy due to the ballistics of the .303 round, but the bolt system of the SMLE was not believed to have the strength to chamber more potent ammunition. A rimless .276 cartridge, which was comparable to the 7 mm Mauser, was developed.

== Pattern 1914 – also known as Rifle, Number 3 ==
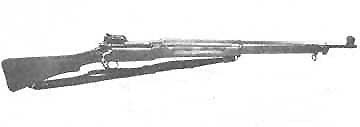
Pattern 14 rifle (derivative)

With the outbreak of the First World War, the change to the ammunition for the Pattern 1913 was abandoned; however, to supplement SMLE production the new design was to be produced chambered for .303. In 1914, the Pattern 1914 rifle (Pattern 13 chambered for .303) was approved for production by British companies, but production was superseded by other war priorities, and three US firms Winchester, Eddystone, and Remington began production in 1916.

The Pattern 14 rifle did not gain widespread acceptance with the British since it was larger and heavier, held fewer rounds and was slower to cycle than the SMLE. The P14 was well regarded as a sniper rifle (with telescopic and fine adjustment iron sights), but largely disregarded outside of emergency use.

=== US M1917 "Enfield" ===
To minimise retooling, the US Army contracted with Winchester and Remington to continue producing a simplified Pattern 14 rifle chambered for the US .30-06 ammunition. This weapon was known as the US .30 cal. Model of 1917 (M1917 Enfield rifle). More of these were produced and used by the US Army during the First World War than the official US battle rifle, the Springfield M1903. The M1917 continued in use during World War II as second line and training rifles as the semi-automatic M1 Garands and carbines were phased-in. Many M1917s were sent to Britain under Lend-Lease, where they equipped Home Guard units; these .30-06 rifles had a prominent red stripe painted on the stock to distinguish them from .303 P-14s. Model 1917 rifles were also acquired by Canada and issued in Canada for training, guard duty and home defence.

== Rifle Magazine .256 inch Pattern 1900 ==
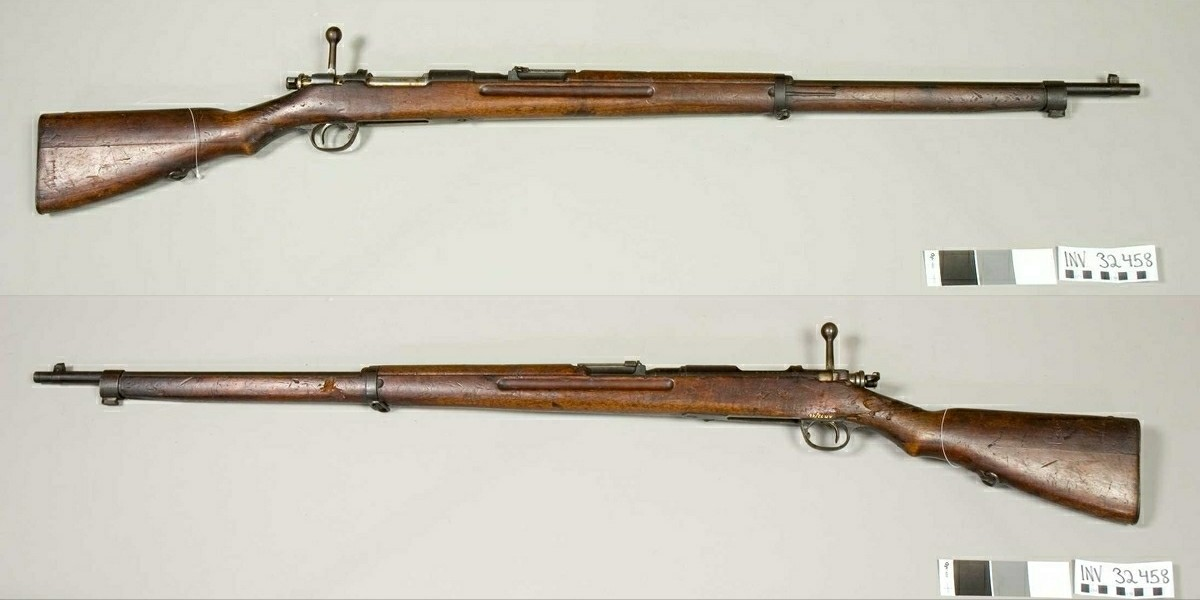
Type 30 rifle

Early in World War I Britain ordered around 150,000 Type 30, and Type 38 rifles and carbines from Japan as a stopgap until the manufacture of their own Lee–Enfield rifles caught up with demand. Some of these rifles were handed over to the Royal Navy and to Arab forces fighting with Lawrence of Arabia. The majority of these weapons (Type 30s and Type 38s) were handed over to Russia in 1916, who were far more desperate for arms. Russia in turn also bought many more thousands of Type 30s rifles and carbines, Type 35 rifles and Type 38 rifles and carbines from Japan. A number of these rifles ended up being left behind in Finland or captured from Red Finns in the Finnish Civil War as the Soviets armed them with Arisakas. Later on Finland gave some of these rifles to Estonia who also received them from other sources. Estonia later converted some or all to take .303 British as Britain had also supplied Estonia with Vickers machine guns and P14 rifles. The Czechoslovak Legion fighting in the Russian Civil War was also armed with Japanese Arisakas, including the Type 30.

== Ross rifle ==
Ross rifle c. WW I

The Ross rifle was a straight-pull bolt-action .303 calibre rifle produced in Canada from 1903 until the middle of the First World War, when it was withdrawn from service in Europe due to its unreliability under wartime conditions, and its widespread unpopularity among the soldiers. Since the Ross .303 was a superior marksman's rifle, its components were machined to extremely fine tolerances which resulted in the weapon clogging too easily in the adverse environment imposed by trench warfare in the First World War. Additionally, British ammunition was too variable in its manufacturing tolerances to be used without careful selection, which was not possible in trench conditions. It was also possible for a careless user to disassemble the bolt for cleaning and then reassemble it with the bolt-head on back to front, resulting in a highly dangerous and sometimes fatal failure of the bolt to lock in the forward position on firing. Snipers, who were able to maintain their weapons carefully, and hand select and measure every round with which they were equipped, were able to use them to maximum effect and retained a considerable fondness for the weapon.

Ross rifles were also used by Training units, 2nd and 3rd line units and Home Guard units in the Second World War and many weapons were shipped to Britain after Dunkirk in the face of serious shortages of small arms.

== Remington Model 1901 ==
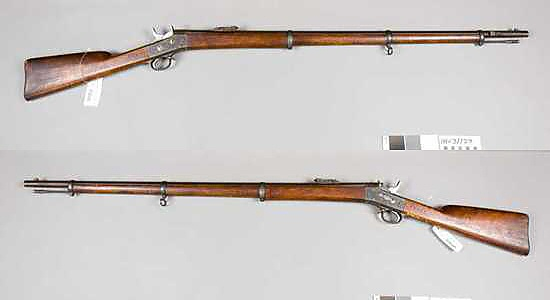
Remington Rolling Block rifle

During World War I, the Royal Navy purchased 4,500 Remington Rolling Block rifles in 7mm Mauser from Remington's leftover stock after production had ended, issuing them to the crews of minesweepers and Q-ships.

== Winchester Model 1894 ==
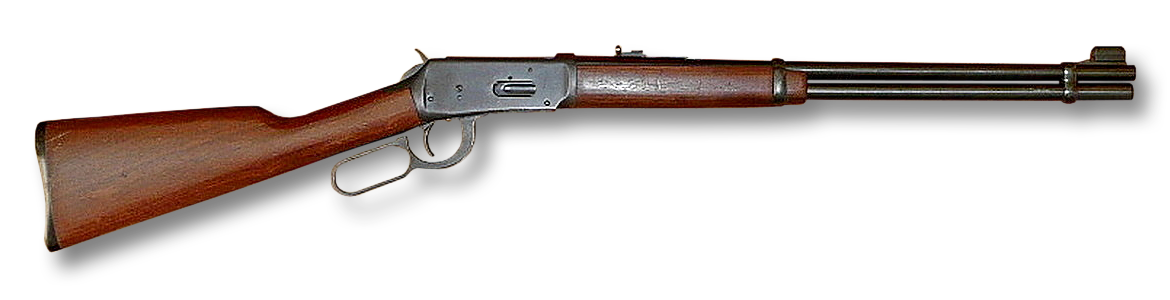
Winchester Model 1894

To release Lee–Enfield rifles for infantry use, the Royal Navy purchased approximately 5,000 .30-30 caliber Model 94 rifles in 1914 for shipboard guard duty and mine-clearing. Winchester '94s were also provided to the British Home Guard in the early years of WWII.

== Remington Model 14 ==
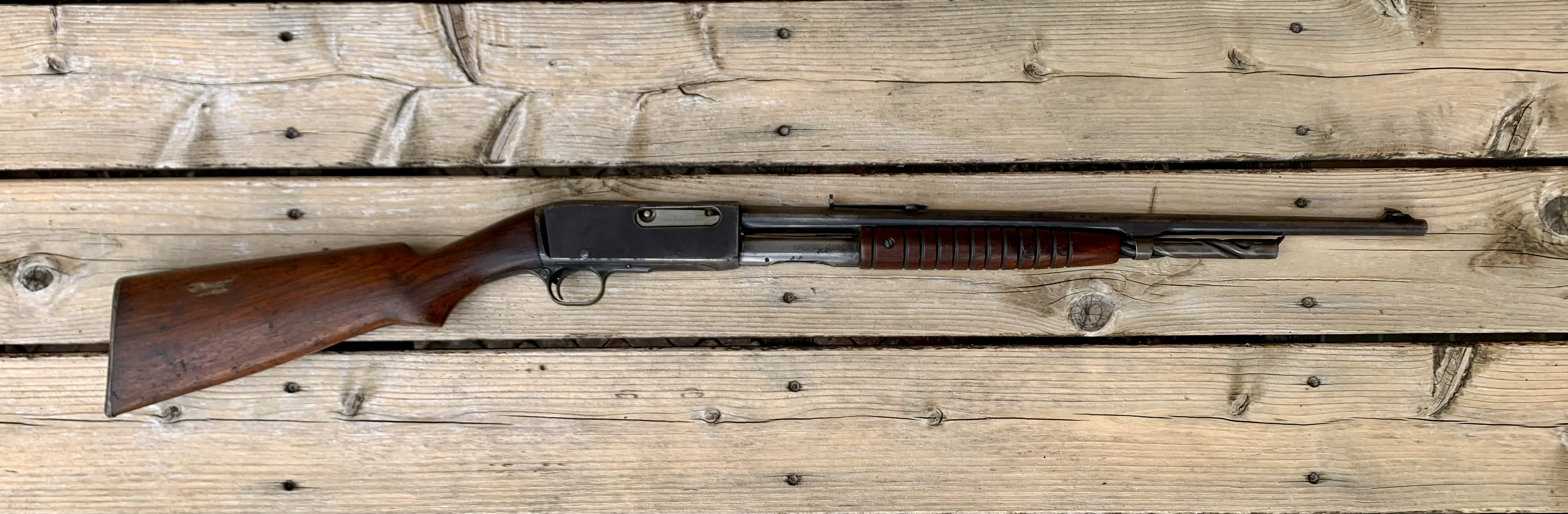
Remington Model 14

4,000 Remington Model 14 1/2 pump action rifles in .44 Winchester calibre were bought for the Royal Naval Air Service.

== Mossberg Model 42MB ==
The Mossberg Model 42MB was a .22 calibre rimfire bolt-action training rifle supplied to Britain during WWII (primarily via Lend-Lease from 1941) to address shortages in training weapons. Over 38,000 were produced, featuring a full-length stock, American-style target sights (often S100), and a 7-round magazine, used by the Home Guard and cadets.

== M1 carbine ==
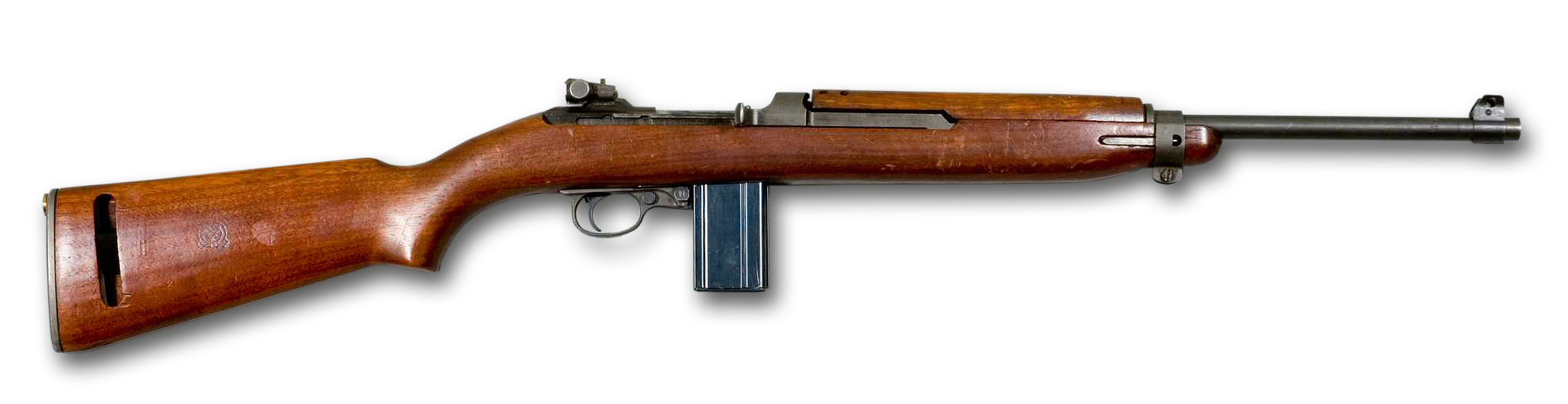
M1 carbine

During World War II, the British SAS used the M1 and M1A1 carbines after 1943. The weapon was taken into use simply because a decision had been taken by Allied authorities to supply .30 caliber weapons from U.S. stocks in the weapons containers dropped to Resistance groups sponsored by an SOE, or later also Office of Strategic Services (OSS), organizer, on the assumption the groups so supplied would be operating in areas within the operational boundaries of U.S. forces committed to Operation Overlord. They were found to be suited to the kind of operation the two British, two French, and one Belgian Regiment carried out. It was handy enough to parachute with, and, in addition, could be easily stowed in an operational Jeep. Other specialist intelligence collection units, such as 30 Assault Unit sponsored by the Naval Intelligence Division of the British Admiralty, which operated across the entire Allied area of operations, also made use of this weapon.. The carbine continued to be utilized as late as the Malayan Emergency, by the Police Field Force of the Royal Malaysian Police, along with other units of the British Army, were issued the M2 carbine for both jungle patrols and outpost defense. The Royal Ulster Constabulary also used the M1 carbine.

== Rifle, Number 8 ==
A .22 subcalibred No. 8 used for cadet training and match shooting. It used a Parker Hale sight, which is no longer in use with the UK cadet forces, replaced with the L144A1.

== Rifle, Number 9 (Enfield EM2) ==
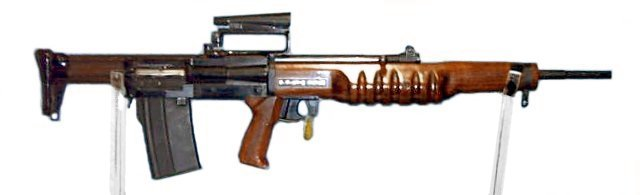
EM-2 bullpup rifle

The EM-2 Bullpup Rifle, or "Janson rifle", was an experimental British assault rifle. It was designed to fire the experimental .280 British round that was being considered to replace the venerable .303 British, re-arming the British and allied forces with their first assault rifles and new machine guns. The EM-2 never entered production due to the United States refusing to standardise on the .280 as "lacking power", but the bullpup layout was used later in the SA80.

A somewhat similar Australian concept was the KAL1 General Purpose Infantry Rifle.

== L1A1 SLR ==
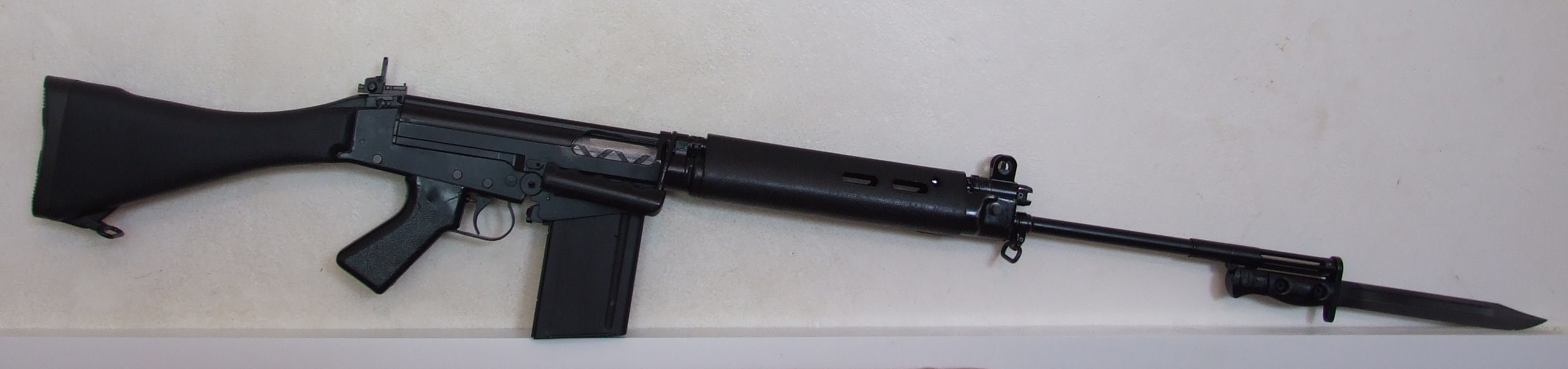
L1A1 rifle with bayonet attached

The L1A1 SLR (Self Loading Rifle) is the British version of the FN FAL (Fusil Automatique Leger) – Light Automatic Rifle, one of the most famous and widespread military rifle designs of the late 20th century. Developed by the Belgian Fabrique Nationale Company (FN), it was used by some 70 or more countries, and was manufactured in at least 10 countries. The FAL type rifle is no longer in front line service in the developed world, but is still in use in poorer parts of the world.

The history of the FAL began circa 1946, when FN began to develop a new assault rifle, chambered for the German 7.92×33mm Kurz intermediate cartridge. In the late 1940s, the Belgians joined with Britain and selected a British .280 (7×43mm) intermediate cartridge for further development. In 1950, both the Belgian FAL prototype and the British EM-2 bullpup assault rifles were tested by the US Army against other rifle designs. The EM-2 performed well and the FAL prototype greatly impressed the Americans, but the idea of the intermediate cartridge was at that moment incomprehensible to them, and the United States insisted on a "reduced full-size" cartridge, the 7.62 NATO, as a standard in 1953–1954. Despite the British Defence minister announcing the intention to adopt the EM-2 and the intermediate cartridge, Winston Churchill personally opposed the EM-2 and .280 cartridge in the belief that a split in NATO should be avoided, and that the US would adopt the FAL in 7.62 as the T48. The first 7.62 mm FALs were ready in 1953. Britain adopted the FAL in 1957 designating it the L1A1 SLR, and produced their own rifles at the RSAF Enfield and BSA factories.

Canada also used the FN, designated the FN C1 and FN C1A1, and like Britain, retained the semi-automatic-only battle rifle well after other countries forces turned to full automatic assault rifles such as the M16 and AK-47. Australia still uses the L1A1 for ceremonial use.

== Colt AR-15, M16 and C7 ==
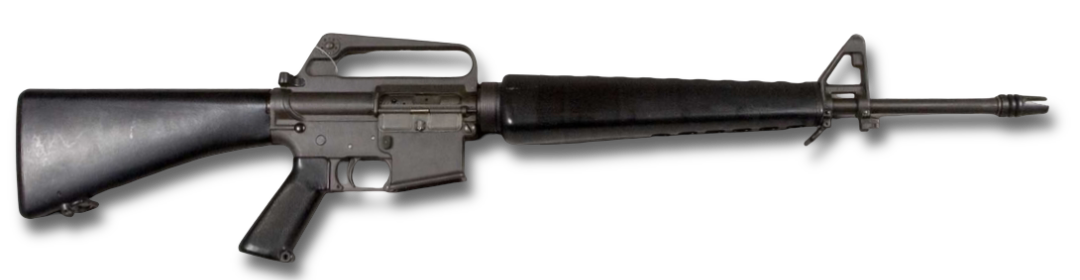
Colt AR-15

The purchase of 6,056 Armalite AR-15 rifles (the precursor to the M16) beginning in 1964 for use by the Far East Land Forces during the Indonesia–Malaysia confrontation was a key development in the jungle warfare campaign. These rifles were primarily used by SAS, Royal Marines, and some Commonwealth units (including Gurkhas) operating along the Borneo border.

== L64/65 ==
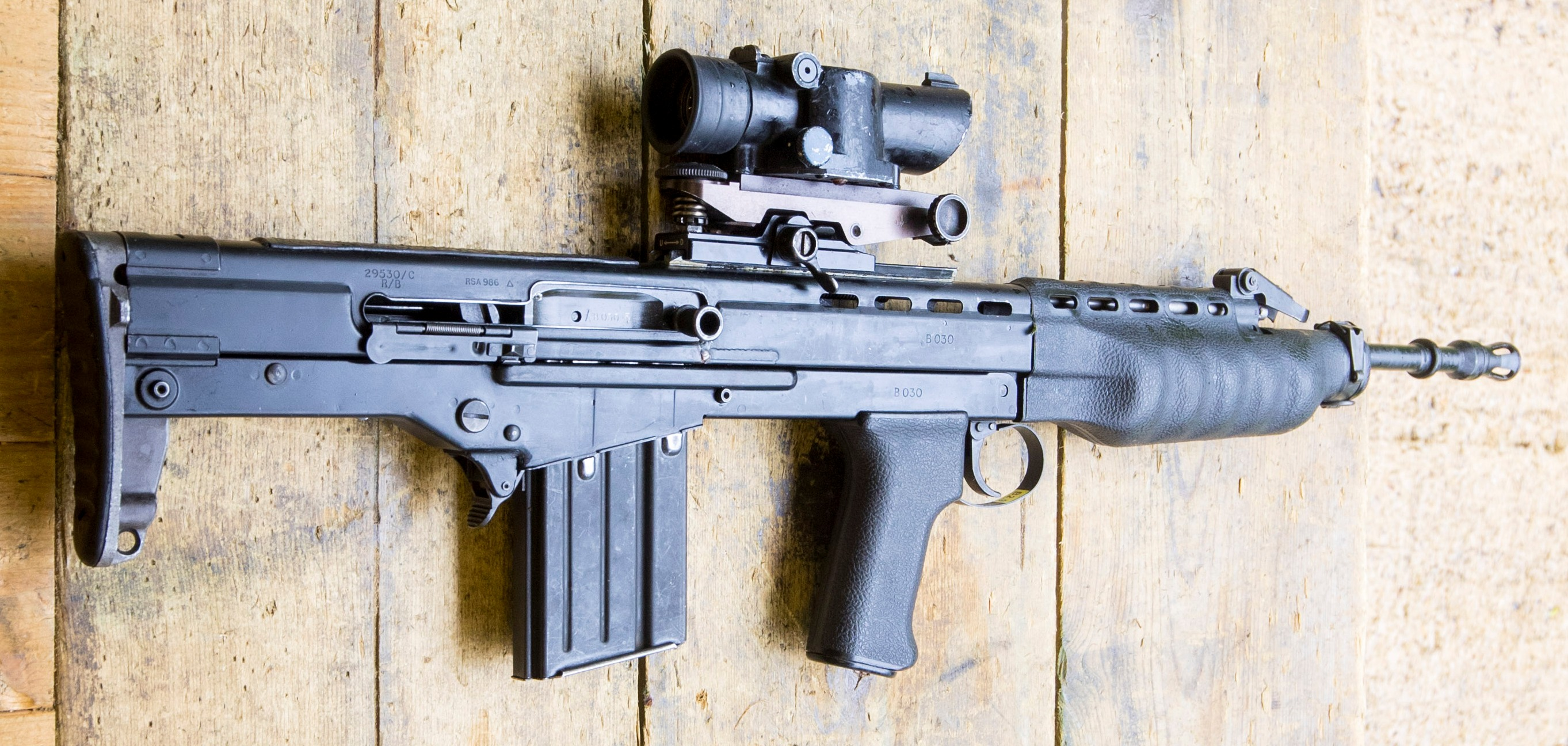
XL64E5 Individual Weapon

During the 1970s, Enfield engineers designed an assault rifle to replace the L1A1 in the Bullpup configuration but chambered in the .190 calibre (4.85 mm). This rifle had better range and ballistics than the 5.56×45mm NATO, although it retained the same cartridge, necked-down for the new calibre. Like the previous EM-2, It was a bullpup and also cancelled due to NATO standardisation. However, the L64 was later chambered in 5.56×45mm NATO as the XL70 and is the main rifle that formed the basis of the SA80.

== Heckler & Koch G3 ==
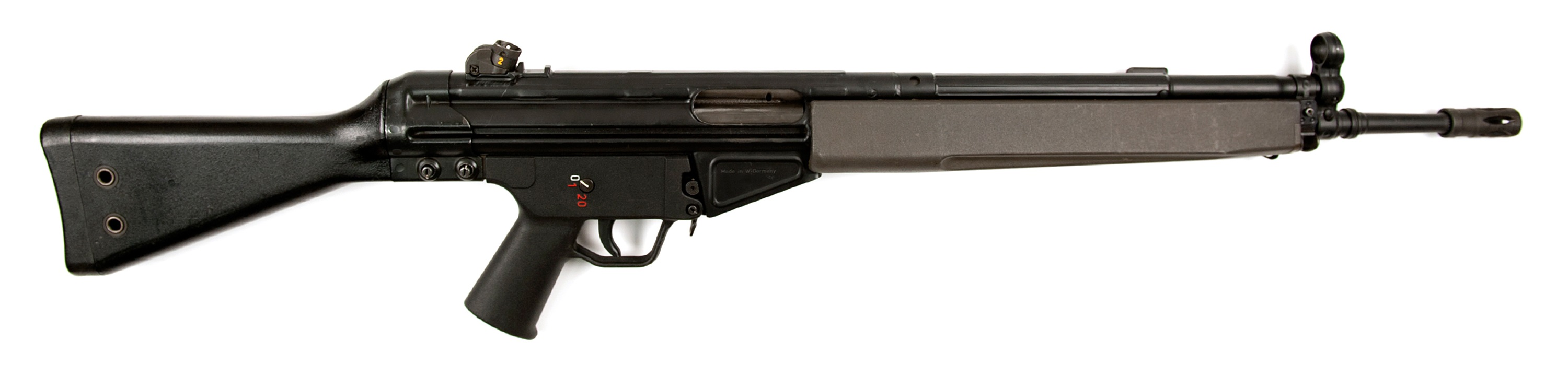
Heckler & Koch G3

Many versions of the G3 were used by the SAS and UKSF like the G3K and MC51. The G3KA4 was designated L100A1 by the British Army.

== Rifle 5.56mm L85 (SA80) ==
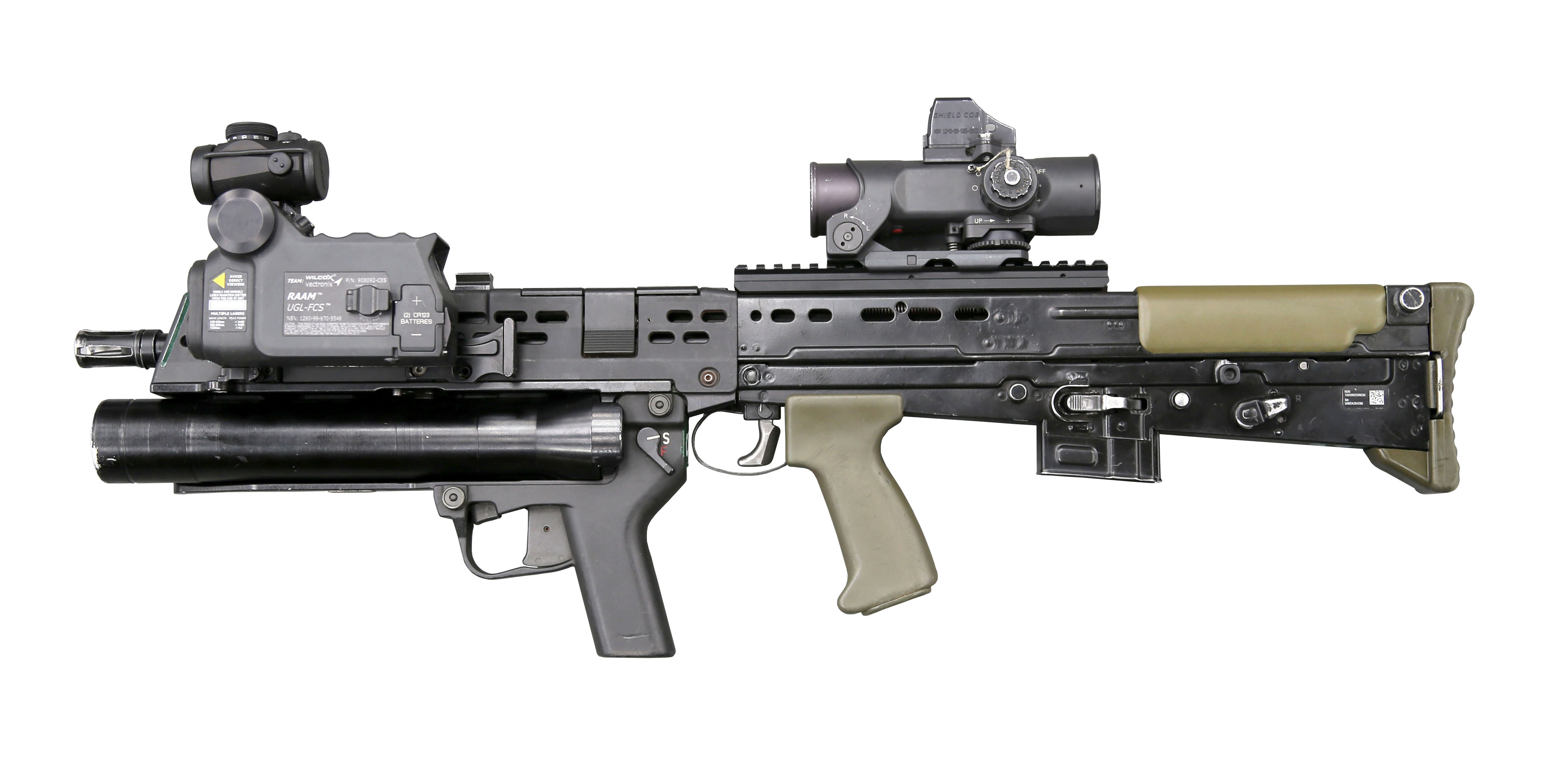
L85A2 IW (SA80) "bullpup"

Bullpup design creatively decreases total weapon length compared with standard assault rifles. It is easy to use not only on the battlefield, but also in areas with limited space, such as armoured personnel carriers. In 1951, the British officially adopted the EM-2 bullpup design as the "Rifle, Automatic, No.9 Mk.1". However, American insistence on the use of 7.62×51 NATO cartridges as the NATO standard meant that the rifle, which used 7 mm rounds, was shelved and the Belgian FN FAL rifle adopted. It was expected that the US would also adopt the FAL then under trial as the T48 but they selected the M14. Another Enfield attempt in the 1970s was the L64/65.

Britain started a programme to find a family of related weapons to replace the L1A1 battle rifle and the Bren gun titled "Small Arms for the 1980s" or SA80. The L85 is designed for the 5.56×45mm NATO cartridge. The gas operated action has a short stroke gas piston, located above the barrel with its own return spring. The gas system has a three position gas regulator, one position for a normal firing, second for a firing in adverse conditions, and the third for launching rifle grenades (gas port is shut off).

The L85A1 was improved in 1997 after constant complaints from the troops. The main problems were difficult maintenance and low reliability. These problems led British troops to nickname the weapon the "civil servant", as, in their estimation, you could not make it work and could not fire it. Improvements were made during 2000–2002 when 200,000 of the existing 320,000 L85A1 Automatic Rifles were upgraded. Improvements were made to the working parts (cocking handle, firing pin etc.), gas parts and magazines.

The improved rifle is named L85A2. During active service, the A2 can be fitted with a 40 mm grenade launcher, a light attachment and a laser sighting device. Sighting systems include the SUSAT with 4× magnification and a trilux gas-filled conical reticule or iron sight consisting of a foresight and rear sight with adjustable rear sight for low light conditions.

In light of operational experience gained during Operation Herrick in Afghanistan and Operation Telic in Iraq, a number of additions to the L85A2 entered service as Urgent Operational Requirements, which ultimately became standard fit. The most noticeable addition has been that of a Picatinny Rail Interface System designed and manufactured by US company Daniel Defense, which replaces the original green plastic front furniture. The RIS system often sports rubber rail covers in coyote brown colour and a GripPod vertical down grip/bipod unit. The Oerlikon Contraves LLM-01 laser and sight combo has been standard for some time but a new laser/light unit by Rheinmetall has been recently cleared for service. Two ×4 optical infantry sights have seen service in addition to the SUSAT. The Trijicon TA-31 ACoG with a red dot CQB sight was purchased as a UOR and latterly a replacement for the SUSAT has entered service namely the Elcan Specter OS4X (pictured) also with a red dot CQB sight mounted on it. An alternative flash eliminator can be fitted, an open ended four pronged design by Surefire. The Surefire flash eliminator gives improved flash elimination, can accept the standard bayonet and also accommodate a Surefire sound suppressor. The Surefire flash eliminator is only for operational use, being incompatible with the standard L85A2 Blank Firing Attachment. Polymer magazines manufactured by Magpul called the EMAG have also been purchased to replace steel magazines in operational environments slightly easing the infantryman's weight burden. It is anticipated that the SA80 will remain in front-line service well into the 2020s.

== Heckler & Koch HK53 ==
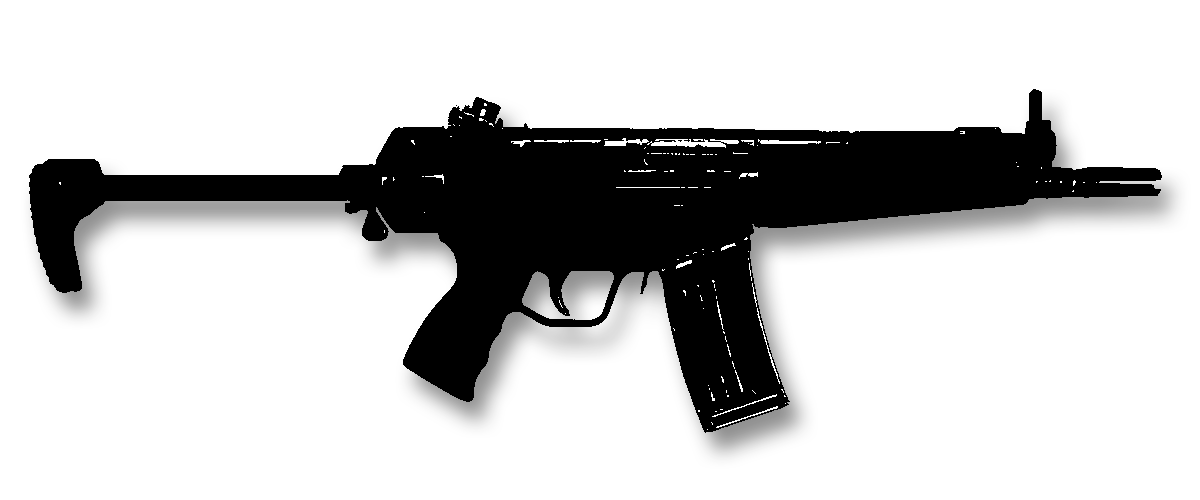
Heckler & Koch HK53

HK53 variant was used by Royal Military Police Close Protection Units (RMP CPU), 14 Intelligence Company, Close Observation Platoons (COP), Royal Marines Police Troop and is known to have been used by the SAS in Northern Ireland. Designated L101A1 in British military service, upgraded in 1996 at the request of the Army Technical Support Agency. Replaced in the early 2000s by C8 SFW and C8 CQB rifles.

== Heckler & Koch HK417 ==
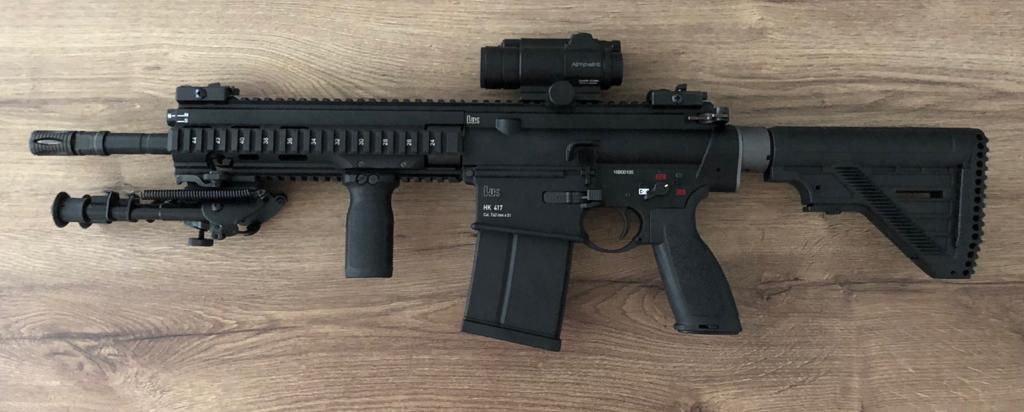
Heckler & Koch HK417

Designated as L2A1 in British service.

== Rifle, 5.56mm L119A1 and L119A2 ==
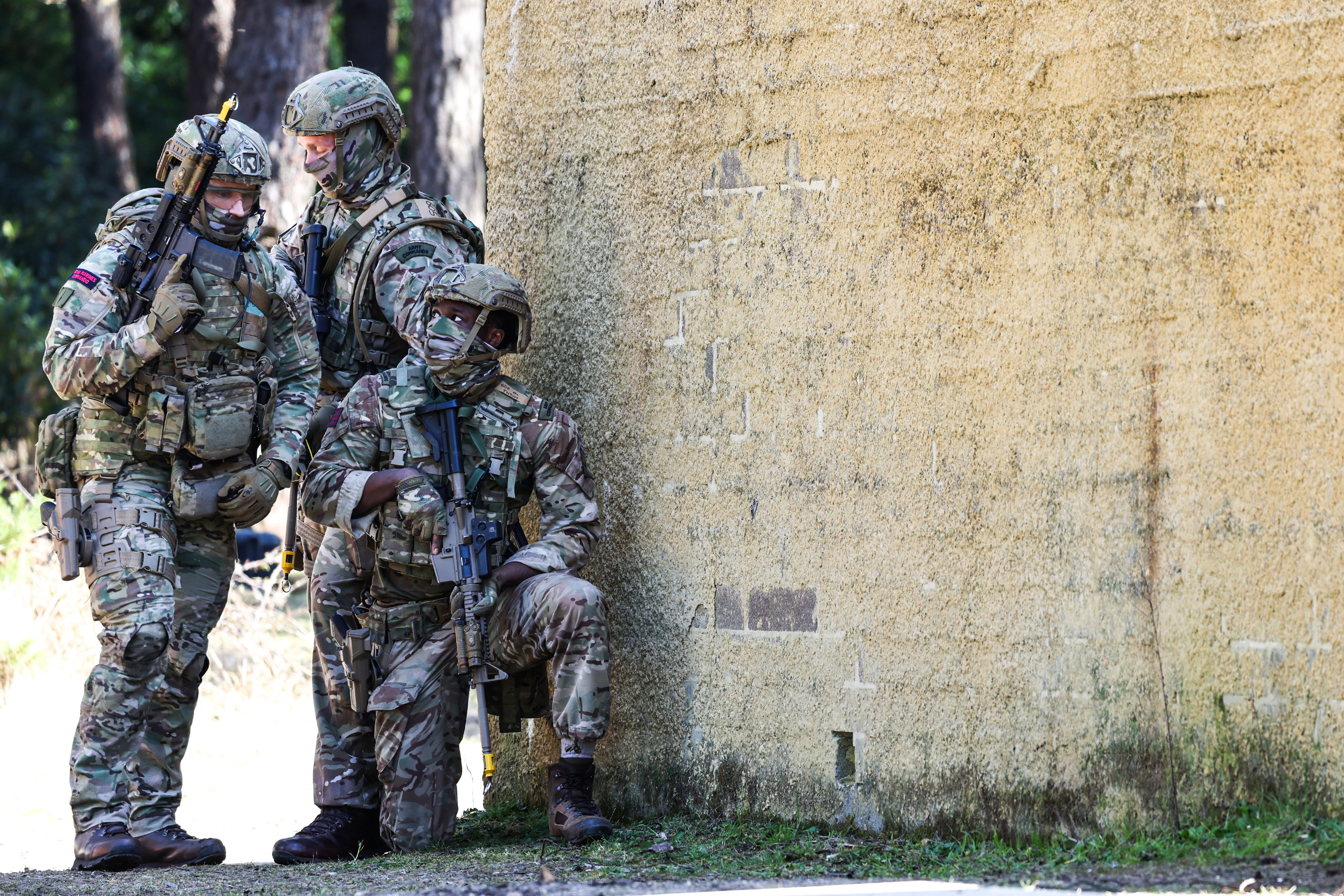
British Commandos with full-length and CQB L119A1 rifles in 2021

The Colt Canada (formerly Diemaco) manufactured C8SFW, a variant of the Canadian Forces C8 carbine, is used by UK Special Forces, elements of the Parachute Regiment and the Royal Military Police. In 2019, it was announced that the carbine would completely replace the L85 in service with the Royal Marines. In 2014, UKSF upgraded to the "L119A2", which features the Integrated Upper Receiver (IUR).

== Rifle, 7.62mm L129A1 ==
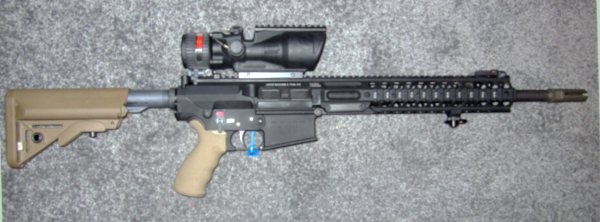
Sharpshooter Rifle L129A1

Lewis Machine & Tool's LM308MWS, was chosen by the MoD in 2010 to meet a £1.5 million urgent operational requirement in the Afghanistan conflict for a semi-automatic 7.62mm rifle with excellent accuracy, whose rate of fire and robustness made them usable within infantry squads, not just by specialised sniper teams. It had to demonstrate lethality in the 500–800-metre range, which was not uncommon in Afghanistan. More than 400 of the semi-automatic Sharpshooter rifles have been bought. It is the first new Infantry combat rifle to be issued to troops for more than 20 years.

== Rifle, 5.56mm L403A1 ==
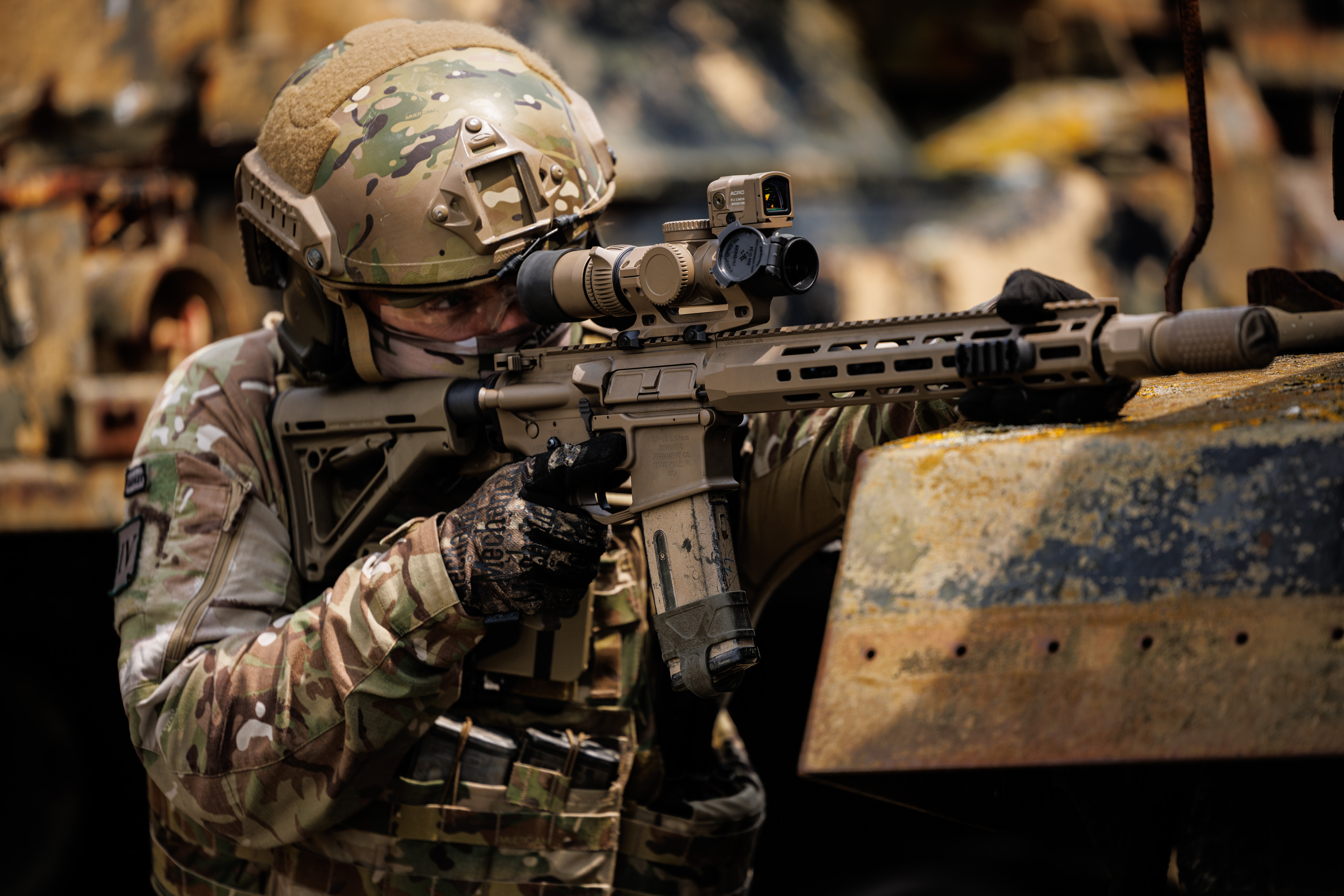
British Ranger Regiment soldier with KS-1 (L403A1)

In 2021 the MoD put out a requirement for an Armalite Rifle (AR) platform based rifle to equip the new special operations-capable forces Army Special Operations Brigade. In September 2023, the Knight's Stoner 13.7" KS-1 rifle designated the L403A1, known as the Alternative Individual Weapon (AIW) System, was selected to replace the L85A2-A3 and L119A1-A2 rifles used by British Army and Royal Marines special operations-capable forces.

== Sig Sauer MCX ==
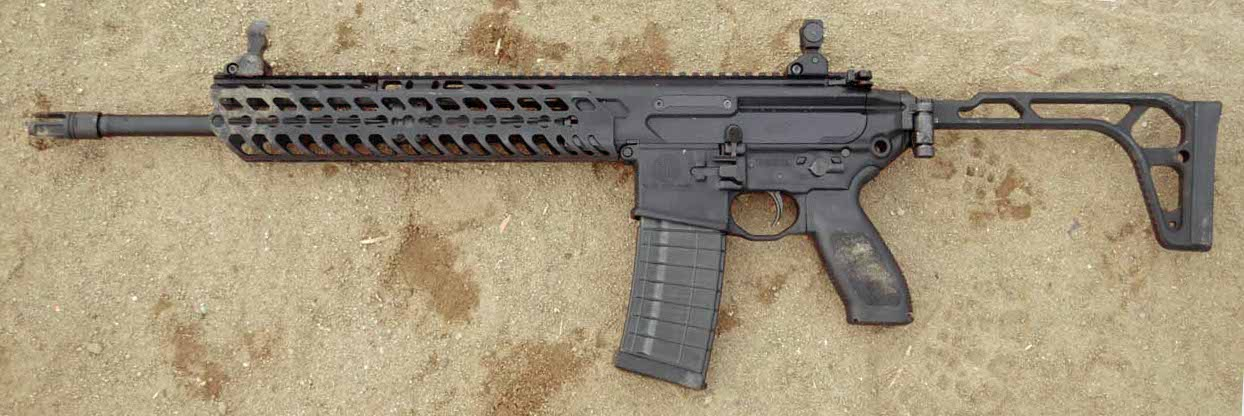
SIG MCX

In 2025 1,500 Sig Sauer MCX rifles were purchased for the Royal Marines 42 Cdo and 47 Cdo Raiding Group.

== L96, L115 and L121A1 Sniper Rifles ==
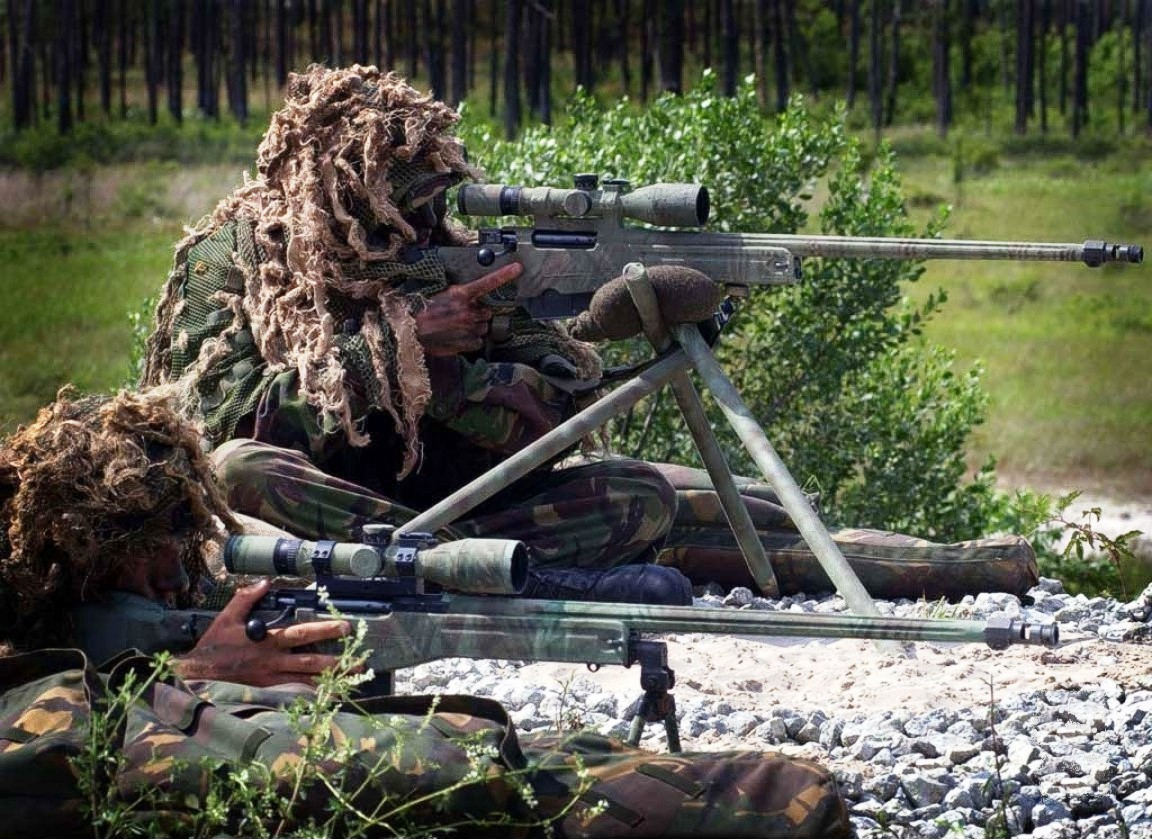
Royal Marines snipers displaying their L115A1 rifles

The L96 is a sniper rifle produced by Accuracy International derived from their PMR (Precision Marksman Rifle), which was designed in conjunction with double Olympic champion Malcolm Cooper. This weapon was adopted into British Service in the early 1980s as a replacement for the Lee–Enfield L42. The L96 in turn was replaced by the Accuracy International L115A3 rifle chambered in .338 Lapua Magnum. L121A1 is used in limited quantities by EOD units, UKSF and Royal Marine Maritime Sniper Teams.

== See also ==
- Bolt action
- Cartridge (firearms)
- Musket
- German military rifles
- List of assault rifles
- List of battle rifles
