= .270 British =

Cartridge

.270 British (.270 Enfield)
- Type: Rifle
- Place of origin: United Kingdom

Production history
- Designed: October 1947

Specifications
- Parent case: Custom
- Case type: Rimless, bottleneck
- Bullet diameter: 7.04 mm (0.277 in)
- Neck diameter: 7.73 mm (0.304 in)
- Shoulder diameter: 10.7 mm (0.42 in)
- Base diameter: 11.3 mm (0.44 in)
- Rim diameter: 10.9 mm (0.43 in)
- Case length: 46 mm (1.8 in)
- Overall length: 62.3 mm (2.45 in)

Ballistic performance
Bullet mass/type	Velocity	Energy
6.48 g (100 gr) FMJ	840 m/s (2,800 ft/s)	2,286 J (1,686 ft⋅lbf)

The .270 British (.270 Enfield) was an experimental intermediate rifle cartridge developed in 1947 and introduced in October of that year, slightly later than the similar .280 British, as a potential successor to the .303 British cartridge. The rimless case had a base diameter of 11.3 mm, and a length of 46 mm. It fired a light-for-caliber 100-grain (6.48 g) bullet .277 (7 mm) in diameter, at a muzzle velocity of approximately 840 m/s (2,800 ft/s), similar in performance to the later 6.8mm Remington SPC. Due to the bullet's light weight and low cross-sectional density, it had poor velocity retention at longer ranges. It had the potential to fire a heavier projectile with superior ballistic coefficient, albeit at a somewhat reduced velocity. This option was pursued with the .280 British, which fired a projectile around 40 grains (2.6 g) heavier, and roughly 400 ft/s (120 m/s) slower, to satisfy U.S. range requirements. The .270 was considered an alternative to the .280, optimized for shorter ranges.

The cartridge was briefly tested alongside the .280 British, although it was dropped in favor of the .280 after 17 months of testing. Ultimately neither design would be adopted, as the United States pushed heavily for its 7.62×51mm to become the NATO-standard infantry cartridge.
