= L64/65 =

Enfield Individual Weapon
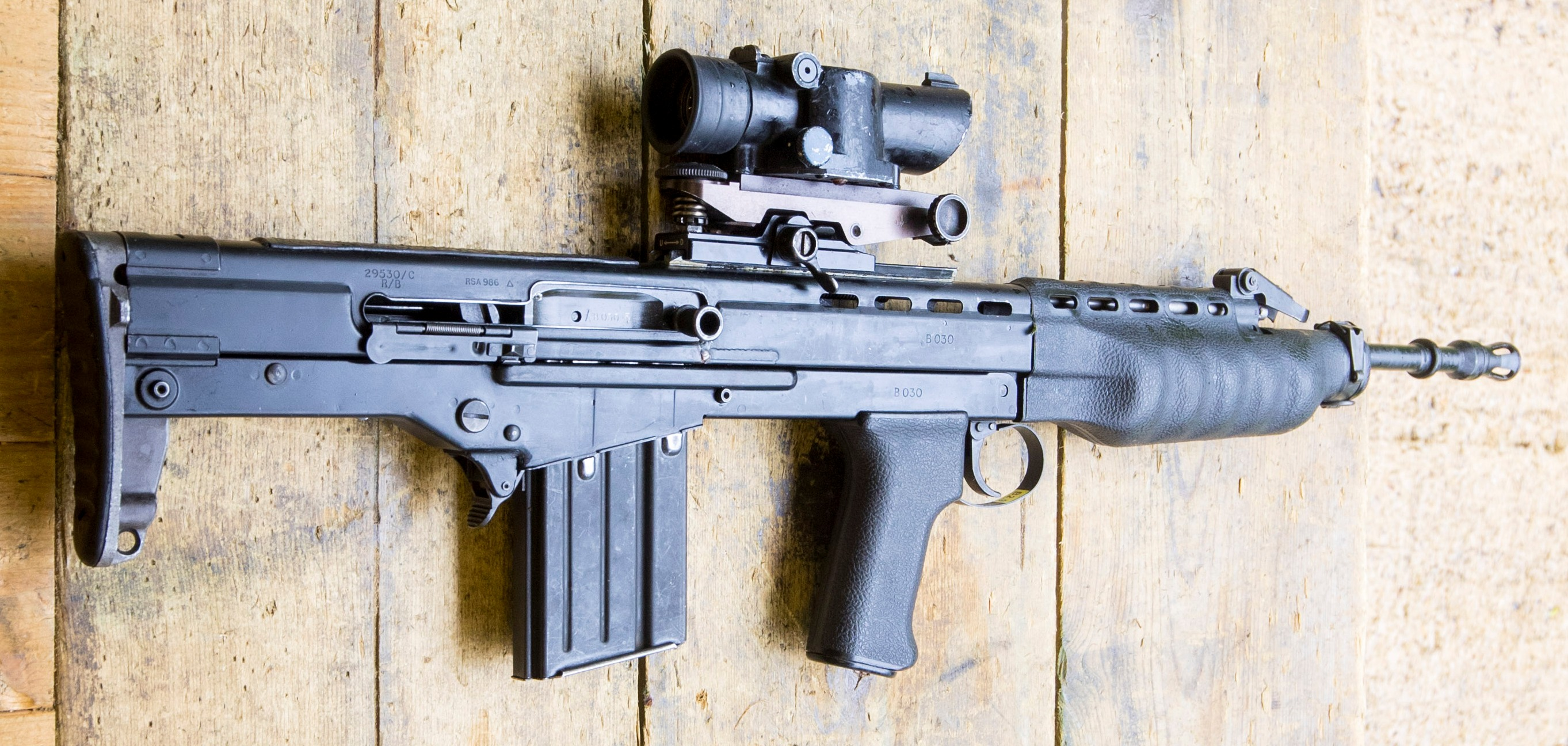
- XL64E5 Individual Weapon
- Type: Bullpup assault rifle
- Place of origin: United Kingdom

Service history
- In service: Experimental
- Used by: British Army
- Wars: See Conflicts

Production history
- Designed: 1972–74
- Manufacturer: Royal Small Arms Factory
- Produced: 1976–78
- Variants: XL64, XL65, XL70

Specifications
- Mass: 7.2lbs (3.72kg) (unloaded, including SUSAT sight)
- Length: 762 millimetres (30.0 in)
- Barrel length: 533 millimetres (21.0 in) (with flash suppressor)
- Cartridge: 4.85×49mm
- Caliber: 4.85mm
- Barrels: 20.4 in (518 mm) 4 grooves, right-hand twist
- Action: Gas-operated, Rotating bolt with short stroke piston
- Muzzle velocity: 900 m/s
- Feed system: 20-round detachable box magazine
- Sights: SUSAT (SUIT)

== Overview ==
The L64 (also called the Enfield Individual Weapon) was an experimental intermediate calibre British bullpup prototype assault rifle developed in the 1970s. At one time it was known as the 4.85 Individual Weapon, a reference to the calibre of the bullet it fired. It used an operating system similar to the AR18 rifle, with a gas piston similar to the Soviet made SVT-40.

== Development ==
The British Army had considered bullpup designs with intermediate calibre rounds in the 1950s, and officially adopted one of these as .280 British in 1951 in the EM-2 and Taden gun. However, US intransigence during NATO standardization efforts, and Winston Churchill's interest in standards above all, led to the adoption of the 7.62×51mm NATO round. This was significantly more powerful than the .280, and could not be easily adapted to the existing weapons. Instead, the British and Canadian armies adopted the L1A1 SLR, a licensed version of the FN FAL, itself originally designed for the .280.

During the 1960s the US found that, as the British had suggested, the 7.62 NATO round was far too powerful to be used in a fully automatic rifle. After considerable wrangling, the US Army eventually adopted the M16 rifle, firing the .223 Remington cartridge of much lower power than even the .280. With standardization broken, the British Army once again started researching lighter rounds in the 1970s. These efforts suggested that a round of similar weight as the M16s, but firing a smaller diameter bullet, would offer the same recoil patterns while having much better penetration and ballistics. The result was the .190-inch (4.85 mm) bullet fitted in necked down but otherwise standard 5.56 mm cases.

The Royal Small Arms Factory developed a rifle to fire the new round. The new L64/65 Individual Weapon was outwardly similar to the earlier EM-2, but adopted a firing mechanism very similar to ArmaLite's latest AR-18 design, which was manufactured in Britain under license by the Sterling Armaments Company from 1975 to 1983. The first examples were available in 1972.

By 1976, NATO was ready to standardize on a small calibre round, and testing of the various rounds head-to-head started in 1977. As designed, the British round performed well, but NATO concluded that the Fabrique Nationale's entry based on the 5.56 mm, the SS-109 gave the best all-round performance and was selected.

The L64 pattern was later developed into the SA80 family of weapons, which entered service with the UK in the mid-1980s.

== See also ==
- EM-2 rifle
- Sterling SAR-87
- SA80
- Leader Dynamics Series T2 MK5
- SR 88
- List of bullpup firearms
- List of assault rifles

== Bibliography ==
- Ferguson, Jonathan S. (2021). Thorneycroft to SA80: British Bullpup Firearms 1901–2020. Nashville, Tennessee: Headstamp Publishing. ISBN 978-1-7334246-2-2.
- Ian V. Hogg and John Weeks – Military Small Arms of the 20th Century – Arms & Armour Press/Hippocrene – 1977 – ISBN 0-85368-301-8
- Falklands Aftermath: Forces '85, Marshall Cavendish (1984), ISBN 0-86307-334-4
