= .280 British =

Rimless bottlenecked intermediate rifle cartridge

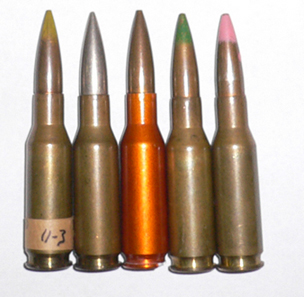
- Various .280 ball cartridges. The orange-cased cartridge is made out of aluminium.
- Type: Rifle
- Place of origin: United Kingdom

Service history
- Used by: British

Production history
- Designer: British Army
- Designed: 1945

Specifications
- Case type: rimless, bottlenecked
- Bullet diameter: .284 in (7.2 mm)
- Neck diameter: .313 in (8.0 mm)
- Shoulder diameter: .448 in (11.4 mm)
- Base diameter: .470 in (11.9 mm)
- Rim diameter: .473 in (12.0 mm)
- Rim thickness: .049 in (1.2 mm)
- Case length: 1.71 in (43 mm)
- Overall length: 2.54 in (65 mm)
- Rifling twist: 1:8.66 in (220 mm)
- Maximum pressure: 45,000 psi (310 MPa)

Ballistic performance
Bullet mass/type	Velocity	Energy
139 gr (9 g) Ball	2,270 ft/s (690 m/s)	1,595 ft⋅lbf (2,163 J)
140 gr (9 g) Ball; 7 mm Mk 1Z	2,549 ft/s (777 m/s)	2,019 ft⋅lbf (2,737 J)
- Source: Cartridges of the World

The .280 British was an experimental rimless bottlenecked intermediate rifle cartridge. It was later designated 7 mm MK1Z, and has also been known alternatively as .280/30, .280 Enfield, 7 mm FN Short and 7×43mm.

Like most armed forces in the immediate post-World War II era, the British Army began experimenting with intermediate rounds after combat experiences with StG 44-equipped German units. The Army began development in the late 1940s, with subsequent help from Fabrique Nationale in Belgium and the Canadian Army. The .280 British was tested in a variety of rifles and machine guns including the EM-2, Lee–Enfield, FN FAL, Bren, M1 Garand and Taden gun.

Despite its success as an intermediate cartridge, the .280 British was not considered powerful enough by the US Army and several variants of the .280 British were created in an attempt to appease the US Army. However, the US Army continued to reject these variants, ultimately adopting the cartridge that was then designated the 7.62×51mm NATO.

== History ==
=== Impetus ===
During World War II the standard British rifle and machine gun round was the venerable .303 British. Efforts to replace the .303 with a more modern round predated even World War I, but a series of events kept it in service in spite of its rimmed design causing a number of alleged problems.

During the war the Allies encountered the new 7.92 "Kurz" cartridge on the battlefield and noted its effectiveness. The Kurz was an "intermediate power" round, less than a conventional rifle round like the .303, but more than pistol rounds like the 9mm Parabellum. This gave the Kurz rifle-like performance in close-range encounters, while still having a small enough recoil that it could be fired in fully automatic fire. This led British small arms designers to begin the development of their own intermediate round, but increased the range requirement so as to be effective out to 400 yards.

To the end of achieving the best cartridge, the "Ideal Cartridge Panel," under the direction of Dr. Beeching, started work in 1945, and by 1947 released their findings. They suggested that the ideal cartridge would be .276 to .280 inch (6.8 to 7 mm) in diameter, weigh between 130 and 140 grains (8.4 to 9 g) and have a muzzle velocity of approximately 2,400 fps (730 m/s). The .280 cartridge was developed under the direction of Brigadier Aubrey Dixon, and approved for testing in mid-1947, a similar design, the .270, was released in October of the same year. Both designations reflect the groove diameter of the rifling; the .276 bullet's actual diameter was .284 inches (7.2 mm). Work of the .270 was ceased the next year in order to concentrate efforts on the .280.

The .280 cartridge at this stage had a rim diameter of .458 inch (11.6 mm), was 1.70 inches long (43 mm), and fired a 130 grain (8.4 g) bullet at 2,270 fps (692 m/s). In 1949 the rim diameter was increased to .473 inch (12 mm), the same as the United States' standard Caliber .30 ammunition, and redesignated .280/30, the bullet was changed to a heavier 139 gr (9.0 g), with a mild steel core still at 2270 fps. In addition to the ball cartridge there was armor piercing and armor piercing-incendiary both with a 130 gr projectiles at 2,200 fps, tracer, with a 115 gr projectile at 2,250 fps, and an observing and a grenade firing cartridges.

=== NATO Competition ===
In early 1950, the .280 cartridge was tested by the Development and Proof Services at Aberdeen Proving Grounds, Maryland, and the results were disappointing in comparison with the American-developed T65 round in 7.62 mm. The demonstrated accuracy from a Mann barrel was very poor, with an extreme spread of 43.6 in (110.7 cm) at 600 yd (548.6 m), compared to the 16 in (40.6 cm) of the T65, the armor piercing (AP) round would have trouble reliably penetrating a standard US M12 protective vest at 800 yards (something the T65 Ball round could reliably achieve), and the AP performance against hardened armor plate was about half that of the T65 AP round. And, the low muzzle velocity gave a very arcing trajectory, with a maximum ordinate of over 19 inches at 400 yards, and 10 inches at 300 yards, giving an unacceptably wide "safe zone". The accuracy performance with the steel core ball was so bad, the United Kingdom representative requested that a lot of 130 gr lead core and a lot of 140 gr lead core ball ammunition be used to evaluate accuracy. These two additional lots did better with extreme spreads of 21.0 inches and 21.6 inches respectively, but were still behind the T65. This was not particularly surprising as the T65 had a three-year head start, development beginning in 1944.

Concurrently with the Aberdeen tests, the US Army Field Forces Board No, 3 (dealing with Infantry equipment) was holding their own tests at Fort Benning, Georgia. Performance at Fort Benning was better using the lead core ammunition, but still lagged behind the T65, with extreme spreads of 12 inches at 600 yards versus 9 inches, and poor AP performance.

In spite of these poor showings, in October 1950, Board No. 3 recommended "that development of small arms ammunition, lightweight rifles and machine guns be carried out in US .276 caliber (British .280 caliber)." This recommendation was strongly objected to by three prominent members of the Board, Colonels Burton L. Lucas, C.W. Pence, and Edward A. Chazal, as well as the entire Field Forces Board No. 1 (Engineers). The Engineering Research and Development Laboratories went even further, stating that in their opinion, the British and Canadians should adopt the M1 and the US Caliber .30 ammunition. In the end, the recommendation was not acted upon, and development of the T65 continued.

The British attempted to improve the performance by seating the bullet less deep in the case allowing for a larger propellant charge, and substituting a lower drag flat based bullet of FN design. These changes brought the velocity up to 2,595 fps, this was what was adopted as 7mm Mark 1z in 1951. However, by this time the T65 cartridge had also been improved going from a 135 gr projectile at 2750 fps, to a 150 gr projectile launched at the same velocity, thus maintaining the performance gap.

In mid-1951, a joint meeting between the US, the UK, Canada and France was held to discuss small arms standardization. The US maintained the position that the .280 fell short of requirements, the French preferred the T65, as did Canada, however was willing to accept the .280 if the US did. The British began to back pedal, suggesting that both be adopted. By September 1951, the NATO Standing Group agreed on a set of military characteristics of required performance for new small arms ammunition. Testing of the British 7mm, Mk 1z fell well short.

A change of government meant that the 7 mm, EM-2 and Taden gun projects were abandoned soon afterwards by Winston Churchill, who returned as the prime minister who desired commonality between the NATO countries. Small amounts of .280 British ammunition were later produced during the 1960s for various small arms trials.

=== After .280 ===
In the late 1960s, a version of the .280 British was created using a 6.25 mm bullet in a necked-down .280 British case. It was designed in response to experiments in the U.K. trying to find an ideal military small-arms round. Large caliber bullets were calculated to need more energy to penetrate various levels of body armor to inflict disabling wounds on soldiers. Out of several "optimum solutions" ranging from 4.5 mm to 7 mm, the 6.25 mm was the preferred solution. The 100 gr (6.5 g) bullet had a muzzle velocity of 2,680 ft/s (820 m/s) and 2,160 J (1,590 ft⋅lb) of muzzle energy. While the 7.62×51mm NATO required 700 joules (520 ft⋅lb) of force on impact to penetrate helmets and heavy body armor, the 6.25 mm required only 580 joules (430 ft⋅lb) of impact force to deliver the same penetration effects out to 600 m. It remained effective for a longer distance and produced recoil closer to that of the 5.56×45mm NATO. However, it was not designed for very long range and its bullet was relatively light. Testing of the 6.25×43mm was conducted from 1969 to 1971, when development ceased in favor of the smaller 4.85×49mm.

== Specifications ==
Name	Bullet Diameter	Case Length	Rim	Base	Shoulder	Neck	OAL	MV	Bullet Weight
.280 British	7.214 mm (0.2840 in)	43.434 mm (1.7100 in)	12.01 mm (0.473 in) for the .280/30; 11.633 mm (0.4580 in) for the .280 British	-	-	-	64.516 mm (2.5400 in)	Approx. 2,500 ft/s (760 m/s) with 140-grain (9.1 g) bullet	130–140 gr (8.4–9.1 g)

Types of bullets and colours of tips:

- AP (130 gr or 8.4 g)
- API (130 gr or 8.4 g): black
- Ball (130–140 gr or 8.4–9.1 g): plain (unmarked), green, pink, yellow, brown
- Observation (130 gr or 8.4 g) (6 gr or 0.39 g WP): red
- Tracer (130 gr or 8.4 g): white

Note: Most cartridges have been observed with a purple annulus. Several experimental cartridge cases were made out of aluminium, in various colors including orange.

Known manufacturers:

- Radway Green
- Fabrique Nationale
- Kynoch

== Performance ==
The following comparisons are excerpts from a manual published by the "Small Arms Group Armament Design Establishment" from the Ministry of Supply:

	.280 British	.303 British Mark VII	.30-06 Springfield
Bullet weight	139 gr or 9.0 g	174 gr or 11.3 g	166 gr or 10.8 g
Muzzle velocity	2,500 ft/s or 760 m/s	2,456 ft/s or 749 m/s	2,770 ft/s or 840 m/s
Timber penetration at 2,000 yards (1,829 m)	2.9 in or 74 mm	2.4 in or 61 mm	1.6 in or 41 mm
Timber penetration at 100 yards (91 m)	45 in or 114 cm	42 in or 107 cm	47 in or 119 cm
Range for penetration of airborne type steel helmet	1,000 yd or 914 m	900 yd or 823 m	1,600 yd or 1,463 m
Vertex height for 600-yard (549 m) range	3.3 ft or 101 cm	3.1 ft or 94 cm	3 ft or 91 cm
Recoil energy per round	7.4 ft⋅lbf or 10.0 J with EM-2 rifle	11 ft⋅lbf or 15 J with No. 4 Rifle	14.4 ft⋅lbf or 19.5 J with M1 Garand

== Variants ==
- .270 British: Designed at the same time as the .280 British . It has a slightly smaller bullet diameter of .279 in (7.1 mm) (versus .284 in or 7.2 mm for the .280) but a lighter bullet (93 to 100 gr or 6.0 to 6.5 g) with a greater muzzle velocity (2,750–2,800 ft/s or 840–850 m/s), longer case (1.8 in or 46 mm) and shorter overall length (2.45 in or 62 mm). Research was abandoned in 1948.
- 7 mm "Optimum": The original .280 British round with the bullet seated less deeply, giving an overall length of 2.6 in (66 mm).
- 7 mm "High Velocity": Longer case (1.95 in or 50 mm), with an overall length of 2.79 in (71 mm). Similar 140-grain (9.1 g) bullet fired at 2,750 ft/s (838 m/s).
- 7 mm "Compromise" (aka T65/7 mm): Necked down T65 (7.62×51mm NATO) to 7 mm. Case length 2 in (51 mm), overall length 2.8 in (71 mm), similar 140-grain (9.1 g) bullet fired at 2,800 ft/s (850 m/s).
- 7 mm "Second Optimum" (7×49mm): Designed by FN. Also known as the 7 mm "Medium" and the 7 mm "Liviano". FN would later sell FAL rifles chambered in this calibre along with a sizeable amount of ammunition to Venezuela. Longer case (1.935 in or 49.1 mm) with an overall length of 2.78 in (71 mm). 140-grain (9.1 g) bullet fired at 2,755 ft/s (839.7 m/s).
- 6.25 mm (6.25×43mm): A British experimental cartridge designed during the early 1970s, using the .280/30 as a parent case, which was necked down to fit a smaller bullet.

== Comparable cartridges ==
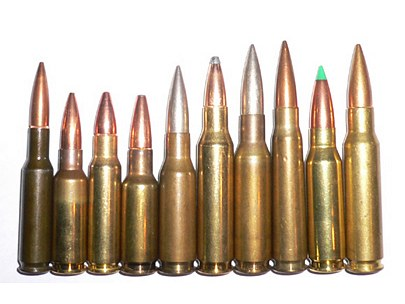
From left to right: 6mm SAW, 6.5mm Grendel, 6.8mm SPC, 7mm Benchrest Remington, .280/30 British, 7 mm-08, 7mm Second Optimum (Liviano), .276 Pedersen, .308×1.75", 7.62×51mm NATO.

For .280 British:

- 7×44mm Danish, a Danish experimental cartridge fired by the Weibel M/1932 tested in 1936.
- 7mm BR Remington, a wildcat cartridge, at one time produced by Remington Arms)
- .308×1.5-inch Barnes and its necked-down 7 mm variant

For 7 mm HV, 7 mm Compromise, 7 mm Second Optimum:

- 7mm-08 Remington

== See also ==
- EM-2 rifle
- BSA 28P rifle
- Taden gun
- 7 mm caliber - other 7 mm cartridges
- Table of handgun and rifle cartridges
