= EM-2 rifle =

British bullpup assault rifle

EM-2
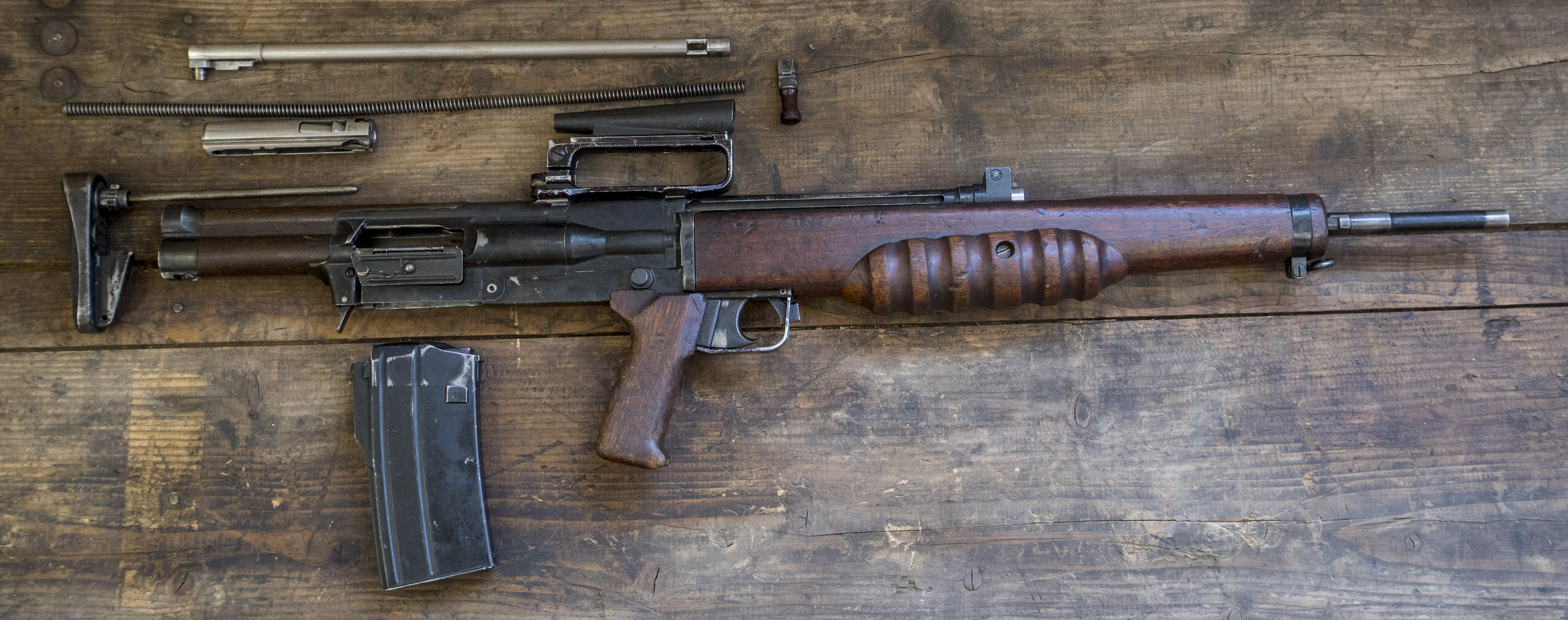
- A field-stripped EM-2
- Type: Bullpup assault rifle
- Place of origin: United Kingdom

Service history
- In service: 1951
- Used by: United Kingdom
- Wars: Malayan Emergency

Production history
- Designer: Stefan Kenneth Janson
- Designed: 1948–1950
- Manufacturer: RSAF Enfield; Chambons; Birmingham Small Arms Company
- No. built: 59
- Variants: 6.25×43mm, 7×49mm, 7×51mm, 7.62×51mm NATO, .30-06 Springfield, Carbine, HBAR, Winter trigger variant

Specifications
- Mass: 3.49 kg (7.7 lb)
- Length: 889 mm (35.0 in)
- Barrel length: 623 mm (24.5 in)
- Cartridge: .280 British
- Action: Gas-operated, flapper-locked
- Rate of fire: 450–600 round/min (7.5 to 10 /s)
- Muzzle velocity: 771m/s (2,545 ft/s)
- Effective firing range: 700 m (770 yd)
- Feed system: 20-round detachable box magazine
- Sights: Optical

The EM-2, also known as Rifle, No.9, Mk.1 or Janson rifle, is a British assault rifle. It was briefly adopted by the British Army in 1951, but the decision was overturned very shortly thereafter by Winston Churchill's incoming government in an effort to secure NATO standardisation of small arms and ammunition. It was an innovative weapon with the compact bullpup layout, built-in carrying handle and an optical sight.

The EM-2 was designed to fire the new .280 British round, one of the first purpose-designed entirely intermediate cartridges, designed to replace the .303 round to a 1945 requirement as a result of combat experience and German advances in weapons design during World War II. It was intended to replace the Lee-Enfield bolt-action rifles and various submachine guns, while the TADEN would replace the Bren gun and Vickers machine gun.

The EM-2 was discontinued by the United Kingdom when the United States claimed the .280 British round was too weak for use in rifles and machine guns, and favoured the much more powerful 7.62×51mm NATO round, leading the British Army to adopt the FN FAL. A bullpup layout for a British service rifle was finally adopted some years later in form of the SA80 assault rifle, which remains in service today.

== Development ==
=== Post-war weapons ===
The British Army entered World War II with infantry weapons based on the .303 British round, including the Lee-Enfield bolt-action rifle, Vickers machine gun and the Bren gun. The .303 had been developed near the end of the 19th century, and had several problems when used in modern designs, notably, the rimmed cartridge design that made it more difficult to use in a magazine. Although the Army had intended to replace the .303 on several occasions dating from before World War I, these efforts were repeatedly put off due to one crisis after another. There had been some consideration of a less powerful cartridge just prior to the start of WWII, using a 7.92 mm bullet, but in the aftermath of the Dunkirk evacuation, any interest in this development ended.

In the immediate post-war period the Armament Design Establishment (ADE) began the development of a series of designs firing German rounds. After the Second World War, Britain was looking for a very light support weapon to replace the service rifle (Lee–Enfield No. 4), the submachine gun (STEN) and the light machine gun (Bren light machine gun). Inspired by the captured German Fallschirmjäger rifles 42 (FG 42), the aim was to develop a multifunctional weapon, called Light Automatic Gun (L.A.G.). Three designers Korsak, Jeziorański and Metcalf developed with their teams different models. Jeziorański was designing an infantry weapon firing the StG 44's 7.92×33mm Kurz, the EM-2. A second infantry weapon was developed by Metcalf, the EM-3. The most promising design was the Light Automatic Gun (L.A.G.) Experimental Model 1 (EM-1) developed by Roman Korsak. The weapons were manufactured in the prototype workshops of the Royal Small Arms Factory Enfield.

=== Intermediate cartridge ===
In 1945, as the war ran down, the Army formed the Small Arms Calibre Panel (SACP) to develop a new standard calibre for future weapons. Military intelligence suggested that it would be ten years before the Soviets would be ready for another major war, so the time frame for re-equipping was the mid-to-late 1950s. This gave the Panel ample time to test a number of options.

Experience during the war led to demands for a smaller intermediate sized cartridge that would allow fully automatic fire from a rifle-sized weapon. The Army demanded a high degree of accuracy due to the emphasis on marksmanship, so the new round was designed to meet the performance of the .303 (7.7 mm) at 1,000 yards (910 m) but at the reduced range of 600 yards (550 m). After testing a variety of designs, they selected a bullet of about .270 in (6.9 mm) calibre and 1 inch (2.5 cm) long, with a mass of 130 grains (8.4 g).

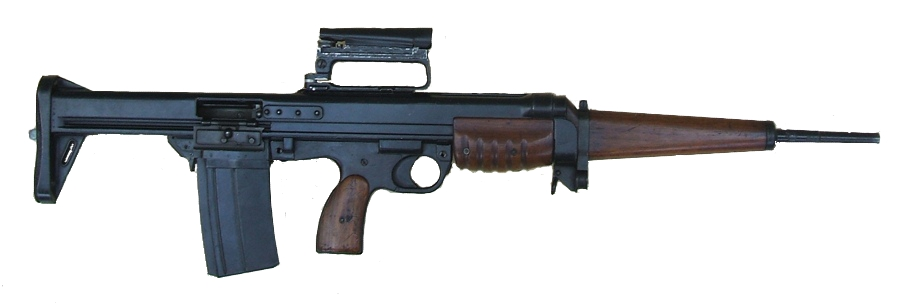
Thorpe EM-1 rifle.

With the release of the SACP reports, interest in the original series of EM weapons ended and a call for weapons based on the new round went out in September 1947. By this time, Korsak had left the original EM-1 program and Kazimierz Januszewski had replaced him and had adopted the anglicized name Stefan Kenneth Janson. Janson's new design was given the name EM-2, in spite of being more closely related to the original EM-1. A new EM-1 was developed by Stanley Thorpe while Eric Hall developed an EM-3. Perhaps due to the confusing re-use of the names, these weapons are often referred to by their designer's names, becoming the Thorpe EM-1, Janson EM-2 and Hall EM-3. Code names were also assigned, the EM-1 "Cobra", EM-2 "Mamba", while the EM-3 did not proceed and did not receive a name, as was the case for an entry from Dennis Burney as the EM-4.

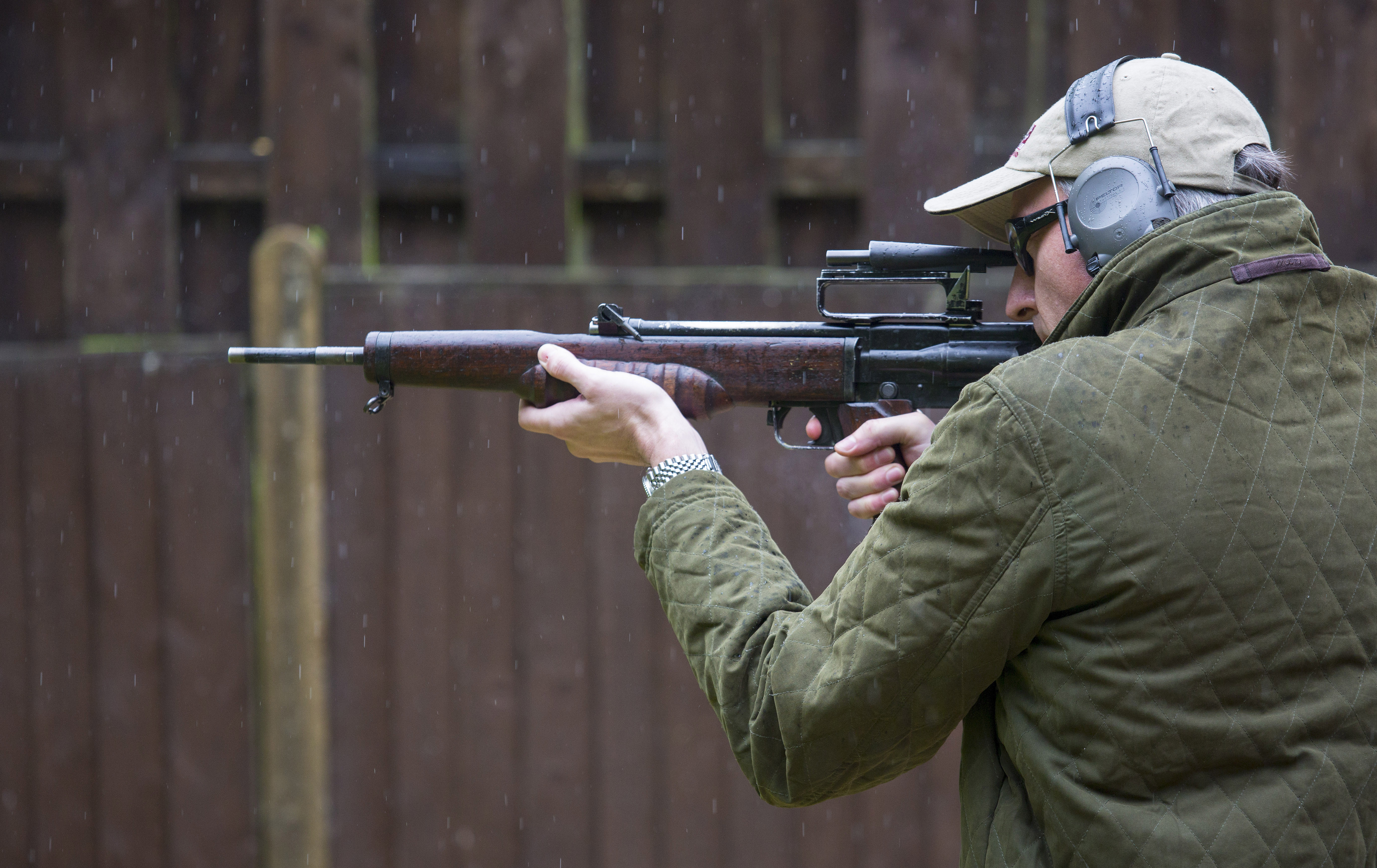
EM-2 being fired

Both the EM-1 and EM-2 were bullpup-style weapons; the magazine and chamber are placed behind the trigger and pistol grip, leading to a shorter overall length (by about 20%) and a better ratio between barrel length and weapon length. The overall length of the EM-2 is 9.5 inches (24 cm) less than the US M14 in spite of its barrel being 2.5 inches (6.4 cm) longer. Both the EM-1 and EM-2 used 20-round magazines with provision for stripper clip reloads (the charger guide was later omitted from the magazines on EM-2s), included the Universal Optical Sight (unit sight) to improve rapid target acquisition, hit probability and target distance estimation, had a carrying handle built into the top, could fire semi-automatic or fully automatic and the .280 (7 mm) round was accurate to about 800 yards (730 metres). The optical sight was fitted with a basic, emergency backup sight on the left hand sight of the scope's body. This was introduced to allow the shooter to take aim even if the glass of the sight was damaged.

The two designs were superficially similar but were internally very different in design and construction, with no parts in common other than sights. The EM-1 used 0.04 in (1.02 mm) thick steel plate pressings for simpler manufacture, a roller locked short recoil mechanism, and was somewhat heavier at about 10 pounds (4.5 kg) with an empty magazine. With uncommon flapper locking and a gas piston above the barrel, EM-2 was similar to Gewehr 43 in its mechanics, although it used a long stroke instead of a short stroke. A fifth design was commissioned from the BSA company, who built prototypes of a more conventional rifle using the same round, the BSA 28P.

The EM-2 was eventually selected as the better design, and was adopted as the British Army's new rifle on 25 April 1951 as the Rifle, Automatic, Calibre .280, Number 9, the designation by which it had been known in the War Office since the American weapons tests of 1950.

In common with other 20th century British designs such as the P14 and SA80, the EM-2 was designed to achieve a high degree of accuracy due to the tradition of British Army emphasis on marksmanship.

== Operational history ==
The EM-2 Rifle saw very limited use, however a number of them were sent to British Army units in British Malaya during the Malayan Emergency, where they were taken on anti-communist insurgency patrols in the jungles.

== NATO standardisation ==
With the creation of NATO in 1949, there was a clear preference that NATO forces would have commonality of weapons and ammunition, so weapons designs had to meet with the approval of more than one government, and it was hoped, would be adopted by the organisation as a whole. It was at this point that the US put forth its own designs for NATO standardisation, using the 7.62×51mm NATO round in their prototype T25 and T44 rifles. Matters came to a head in 1951 in a shoot-off conducted at the Aberdeen Proving Grounds, with the US claiming the British round was underpowered, and the British claiming the US round was too powerful to be used in a rifle in full-automatic mode. At the same trials the Belgian .280 FN FAL was also tested.

A series of lengthy debates followed, which were finally settled in an unlikely fashion when Canada stated they would use the British .280 round, but only if the US did as well. It was clear this would never happen. Winston Churchill felt a NATO standard was more important than any qualities of the weapon itself and overturned the decision by the previous Labour Minister of Defence, Manny Shinwell, who had already announced an intention to move to the .280 and the EM-2. During this time, prototype EM-2s were built in several different calibres: Chambons built two for the 7×49mm Second Optimum cartridge and another two for the 7.62×51mm NATO. One of the Chambon prototypes was even rebuilt for the US .30-06 cartridge. RSAF-Enfield and BSA built 15 and 10 prototypes for the 7.62×51mm, respectively. Canadian Arsenals Limited also built 10 rifles for the 7×51mm compromise cartridge.

It was clear the EM-2 could not be easily adapted to the powerful 7.62×51mm NATO round, so the only realistic alternative was to adopt a licensed version of the FN FAL from Fabrique Nationale. Created by Dieudonné Saive, the FAL was itself a re-designed version of FN's own design for an intermediate cartridge rifle using the .280 round (the first prototypes had used the 7.92×33mm Kurz German round from the StG44). However, the FAL was more easily adaptable to handle the more powerful, longer round.

It grew in weight and length as a consequence. Churchill had hoped that with the British Commonwealth and other NATO countries adopting the FN FAL the US Army would do so as well, however the US adopted the T44 (an updated version of the M1 Garand) as the M14, which had won US trials against a more radical experimental rifle, the T25.

In time, the British position on intermediate cartridges was vindicated, the 7.62×51mm proving to be too powerful to be controllable in rifles using automatic mode, smaller cartridges being deemed necessary for that application. Due to combat experience in Vietnam in the mid-1960s, the US adopted the AR-15 as the M16. Chambered for the 5.56×45mm NATO intermediate cartridge, the M16 replaced the M14 which had been adopted little more than a decade earlier.

Some years afterwards, NATO also agreed to move to a smaller round more suitable for full-automatic fire and lighter weapons, ultimately adopting the 5.56×45mm. Prior to committing to the 5.56mm, the British Army conducted additional intermediate cartridge research.

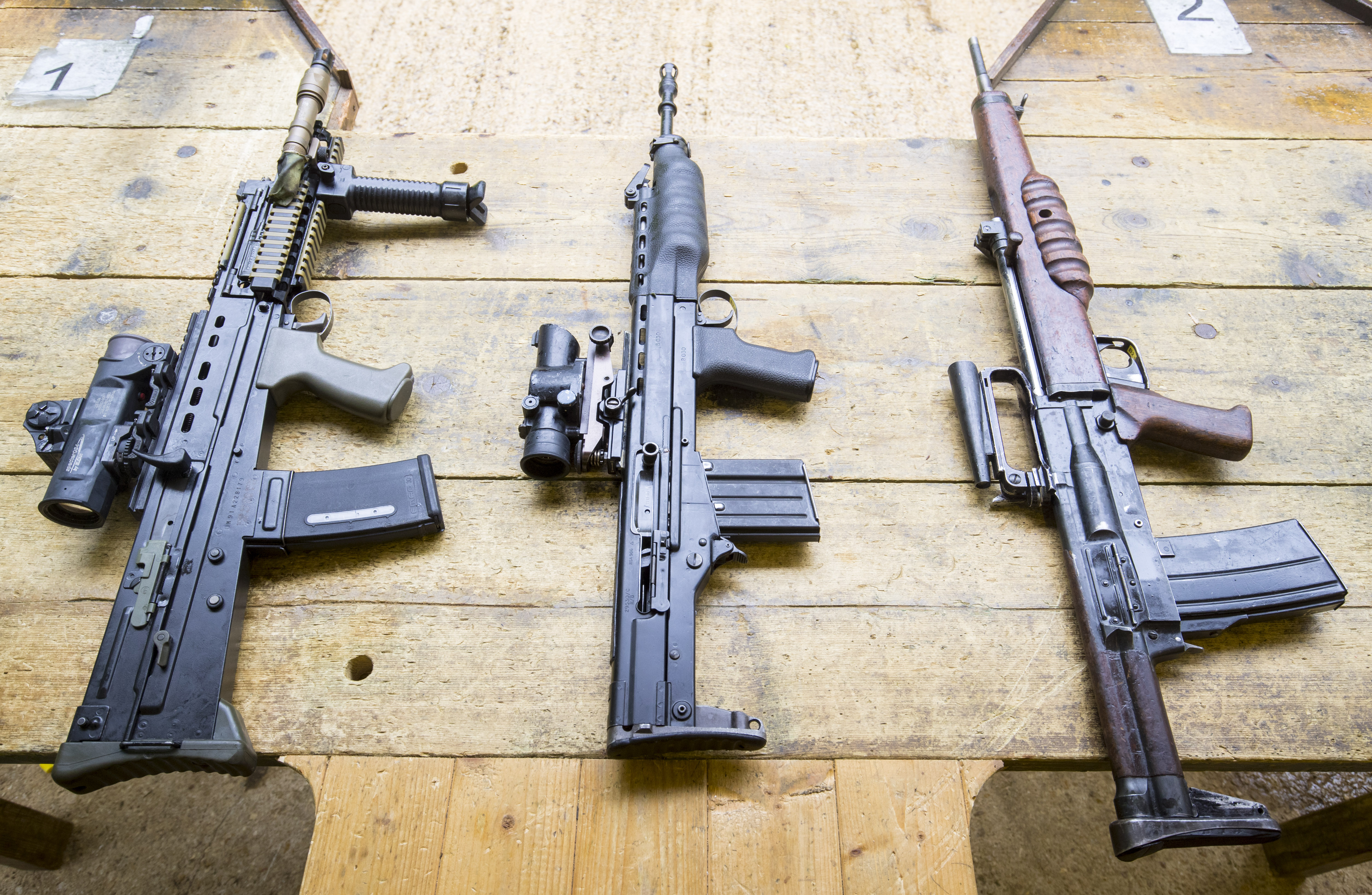
Pictured left to right: SA80-A2, XL 60 and EM-2

Around 1970, a pair of the original .280 EM-2 were re-barrelled for an experimental 6.25×43mm cartridge. However, the revival of the EM-2 was short-lived as the 6.25mm was dropped for an even smaller 4.85mm cartridge in a completely new rifle, the L64/65 which evolved into the 5.56mm SA80 currently used by the British Army. In spite of having a similar appearance due to its bullpup layout the SA80 is mechanically unrelated to the EM-2; rather it is essentially a bullpup adaptation of the AR-18/SAR-87. However, the concept of an Infantry Personal Weapon which led to the design of the EM-2 was reflected in the SA80 system.

== See also ==
- KAL1 General Purpose Infantry Rifle, similar Australian concept intended for Jungle Warfare conditions.
- SLEM-1 – (Belgium)
- L64/65 – (United Kingdom)
- Model 45A – (United States)
- Sieg rifle – (United States)
- List of assault rifles
- List of bullpup firearms
