= Weibel M/1932 =

M/1932 automatgevær
- Type: Light machine gun
- Place of origin: Denmark

Service history
- Used by: Danish Army

Production history
- Designed: 1932
- Manufacturer: Dansk Industri Syndikat

Specifications
- Cartridge: 7x44 mm Danrif
- Caliber: 7 mm
- Action: gas, select fire
- Feed system: 20-round box magazine

The Weibel M/1932 was a light machine gun concept of Danish origin and was considered to supplement the Madsen gun in Danish service. It was fed from a 20-round box magazine chambered in the intermediate 7×44mm round. This calibre was considered underpowered for its day but shares the same ballistics as later calibres such as the 7.92×33mm Kurz, 7.62×45mm vz. 52 and 7.62×39mm M43 used in assault rifles.
