= TADEN gun =

British experimental light machine gun

TADEN machine gun
- Type: Light machine gun
- Place of origin: United Kingdom

Service history
- In service: 1951
- Used by: United Kingdom

Production history
- Manufacturer: Enfield RSAF

Specifications
- Mass: 11.03 kg
- Length: 889 mm
- Barrel length: 623 mm
- Cartridge: .280 British
- Caliber: .276 (7 mm)
- Action: gas operation
- Rate of fire: 450 to 600 round/min
- Feed system: Non-Disintegrating Metal-Link Belt
- Sights: Fixed

The TADEN was a British experimental light and medium machine gun firing the .280 in (7 mm) intermediate cartridge. Alongside the bullpup EM-2 rifle design, it formed part of a proposal to reequip the British Army with new small arms which would use a round smaller than the .303 inch which was shown to be impractical for use in a modern assault rifle. The name comes from the designer, Harold Turpin ('T') at the Armament Design Establishment ('AD') and Enfield ('EN').

The TADEN used the action and gas system of the Bren but fired from 250-round non-disintegrating metal-link belts rather than box magazines. The light machine gun model used a buttstock and trigger group like the Bren and the medium machine gun model used spade grips and a butterfly trigger like the Vickers machine gun. Two basic versions were developed, a light machine gun with a bipod intended to replace the Bren gun, and a heavier tripod mounted version to replace the Vickers medium machine gun, or as they termed it at the time, a Sustained Fire Machine Gun. The overall plans called for the EM-2 would replace the Lee–Enfield rifle and 9 mm submachine guns.

The TADEN and EM-2 projects were discontinued when the United States Army refused to consider the .280 cartridge for the new NATO standard on the basis that it was less powerful than their .30-06 Springfield round (and, as others have suggested, the reluctance to adopt a round developed outside the USA).

It was decided that the TADEN and EM-2 could not realistically be reworked to take the new NATO round and alternatives were sought. The British Army reequipped with licence-built variants of the Belgian 7.62 mm FN MAG and FN FAL respectively. A belt-fed derivative of the Bren gun had been considered for the GPMG role, known as the X11, but although not selected the Bren was kept on after adaptation to use the NATO round.

== Notes and references ==
- Hogg, Ian (2002). Machine Guns: 14th Century to Present. DBI Books. ISBN 0-87349-288-9.
