= EM-4 rifle =

- Type: Semi-automatic rifle
- Place of origin: United Kingdom

Production history
- Designer: Dennis Burney
- Designed: 1944
- Manufacturer: Broadway Trust Company

Specifications
- Cartridge: .27 Broadway Trust
- Calibre: 0.27 in (6.9 mm)

The EM-4 rifle (Burney rifle) was an experimental bullpup rifle of British origin designed by Sir Dennis Burney of the Broadway Trust Company.

== Overview ==
The principle of the Burney was an enlarged chamber that the gases expanded into and were then exhausted through the barrel using a type of high–low system. The Burney 7mm rifle, usually referred to as the Broadway Trust Rifle, may have been referred to as the Experimental Model EM-4.

The rifle was under trial in 1946-1947 but failed to show sufficient promise and was abandoned in March 1948.

== Design ==
The action is short recoil, and is as follows:

1. When loaded the barrel is held to the rear by the trigger sear, against the force of the barrel spring, with the round chambered and bolt locked.

Action of the rifle based upon UK patent 645751

2. When the trigger is pulled the sear is dropped and the barrel, bolt and magazine all run forward due to the barrel spring. Before reaching the fully forward position, the pivoted hammer hits a fixed cam and strikes the firing pin.

3. The forward momentum of the barrel and bolt group must first be arrested by the recoil, before they are accelerated to the rear. As the group recoils, a cam forces the bolt handle up, rotating the splined bolt head out of lock, which continues to the rear. A claw extractor and spring ejector remove the spent cartridge.

4. The bolt spring runs the bolt forward and chambers a round. The bolt head is relocked by a torsion spring between the bolt halves.

== Bibliography ==
- Ferguson, Jonathan S. (2021). Thorneycroft to SA80: British Bullpup Firearms 1901–2020. Nashville, Tennessee: Headstamp Publishing. ISBN 978-1-7334246-2-2.
