= 458 (disambiguation) =

458 may refer to:

- The number 458

== Dates ==
- The year 458 AD
- The year 458 BC

== Places ==
- The area code 458
- 458 Hercynia, a main-belt asteroid, the 458th asteroid registered
- Rural Municipality of Willow Creek No. 458, Saskatchewan, Canada; no. 458 rural municipality named Willow Creek
- Montgomery No. 458, Alberta, Canada; no. 458 municipal district named Montgomery
- Road 458, see List of highways numbered 458

== Transportation ==
- Ferrari 458, a sports car
- British Rail Class 458, an electric multiple unit passenger train

== Other uses ==
- No. 458 (SPARTAN II id code), personal name Nicole, a fictional character from DOA/HALO crossover; see List of Dead or Alive characters

== Firearm Cartridges ==
- .458 Winchester Magnum
- .458 SOCOM
- .458 Express
- .458 Lott
- .458 HAM'R
- .458×2-inch American

== See also ==
- 458th (disambiguation)
