= .416 Rigby =

British rimless rifle cartridge

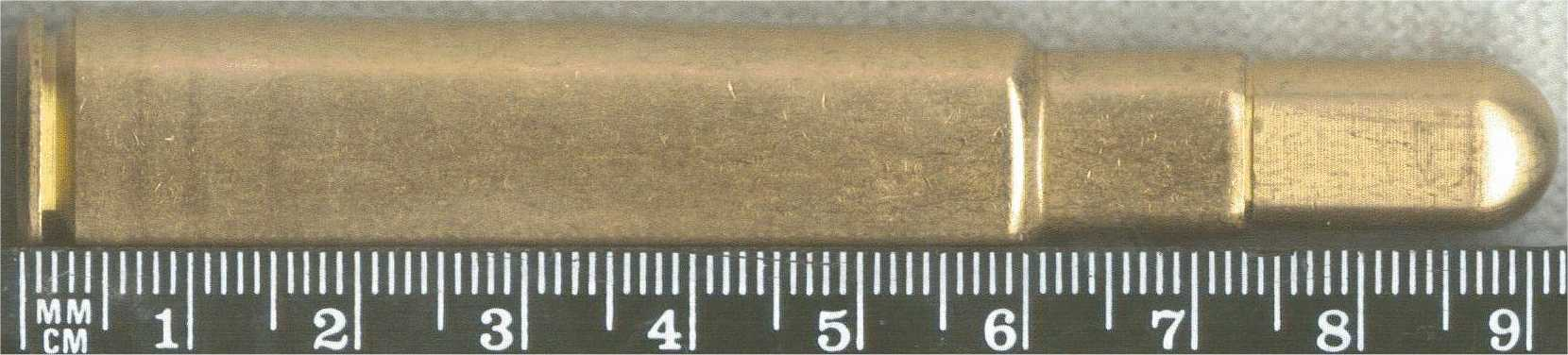
- Type: Rifle
- Place of origin: England

Production history
- Designer: John Rigby & Company
- Designed: 1911
- Produced: 1912–present

Specifications
- Case type: Rimless, bottleneck
- Bullet diameter: 10.57 mm (0.416 in)
- Neck diameter: 11.33 mm (0.446 in)
- Shoulder diameter: 13.72 mm (0.540 in)
- Base diameter: 14.96 mm (0.589 in)
- Rim diameter: 14.99 mm (0.590 in)
- Rim thickness: 1.65 mm (0.065 in)
- Case length: 73.66 mm (2.900 in)
- Overall length: 95.25 mm (3.750 in)
- Case capacity: 8.36 cm^{3} (129.0 gr H_{2}O)
- Rifling twist: 1 in 16.5 in (420 mm)
- Primer type: Large rifle magnum
- Maximum pressure (C.I.P.): 325.00 MPa (47,137 psi)
- Maximum pressure (SAAMI): 358.53 MPa (52,000 psi)

Ballistic performance
Bullet mass/type	Velocity	Energy
400 gr (26 g) Trophy Bonded Bear Claw	2,300 ft/s (700 m/s)	4,698 ft⋅lbf (6,370 J)
400 gr (26 g) Swift A-Frame	2,350 ft/s (720 m/s)	4,905 ft⋅lbf (6,650 J)
400 gr (26 g) Trophy Bonded Sledgehammer Solid	2,370 ft/s (720 m/s)	4,988 ft⋅lbf (6,763 J)
400 gr (26 g) Woodleigh Hydro Solid	2,400 ft/s (730 m/s)	5,115 ft⋅lbf (6,935 J)
- Test barrel length: 610 millimetres (24 in); Source: Federal Premium Ammunition

The .416 Rigby / 10.57x73mm is a rifle cartridge designed in 1911 by London based gunmaker John Rigby & Company, for hunting dangerous game. It is the first cartridge to use a bullet of .416 inch (10.57 mm) diameter. The rifles, as built by John Rigby & Co., were initially made up on the Magnum Mauser 98 action (a derivative of the Gewehr 98 bolt-action rifle), although in later years, some were made on standard length actions, a perfect example being the rifle used by legendary professional hunter Harry Selby. Other famous users of the cartridge were Commander David Enderby Blunt, John Taylor, and Jack O'Connor.

== Origin and history ==
Two major developments at the turn of the 20th century set the course for the development of .416 Rigby as a successful big game hunting cartridge. The first was the development of cordite in the UK in 1889 and second the development of the Magnum Mauser 98 action based on the Gewehr 98 bolt-action magazine rifle which was designed in Germany.

Prior to the invention of cordite, rifles used black powder as a propellant. The combustion of black powder produces about 55% solid products, whereas smokeless powder such as cordite produces almost entirely gaseous combustion products. As a result, half the mass of cordite will produce roughly the same amount of propellant gases, compared to the older black powder. This means cartridges using cordite can be made smaller, or they can produce a higher pressure at the same cartridge size. The development of smokeless powder revolutionised the rifle. One version of this smokeless powder, cordite, allowed higher pressures to be developed, thereby increasing the velocity and performance of rifle cartridges. The higher velocities produced by cordite allowed the use of smaller diameter projectiles which penetrated big game much more reliably.

The next improvement was the development of the Gewehr 98 rifle by Paul Mauser. Paul Mauser did not invent the bolt-action rifle but rather he refined the design, allowing controlled round feeding, a stripper clip for fast loading, and a strong action with the ability to withstand high pressures generated by the new smokeless powders. The rifle design would go on to become the most common and successful rifle design in the history of firearms. During World War II most Axis and Allied nations, with the exception of the Americans (M1 Garand), British (Lee–Enfield), and the Russians (Mosin–Nagant) used rifles based on the Mauser 98 action. Today this is still the most popular rifle design and is used by Heym, Holland & Holland, Mauser, Rigby, Westley Richards, Winchester, and several other gunmakers. The Mauser 98 action provided the consumers and gun makers an inexpensive alternative to the double- and single-shot rifles which until that time predominated the dangerous-game hunting scene.

At the turn of the 20th century, four major British rifle manufacturers, Holland & Holland, John Rigby & Co., W. J. Jeffery & Co., and Westley Richards designed cartridges which could operate in the Magnum Mauser 98 action and could offer big-bore nitro express ballistics and performance in a bolt-action rifle. (Note: Bolt-action rifles were often known as "magazine rifles" in Britain during this period) The result was the introduction of medium-bore big-game cartridges .375 H&H Magnum, .416 Rigby, .404 Jeffery and .425 Westley Richards. The performance of these cartridges on game matched the performance of the big-bore Nitro Express cartridges. The performance of these cartridges was due to the sectional density (greater than 0.300 lb_{m}/in^{2}) and higher velocity (~2,300 ft/s [700 m/s]).

The first .416 Rigby rifles used the Magnum Mauser 98 Square Bridge No. 5 action. The large bolt face and the length of the Magnum Mauser 98 No. 5 action was easily adapted for use with the .416 Rigby cartridge. As the Magnum Mauser 98 action became scarcer after World War II, .416 Rigby rifles were built on Enfield P-17 and the BRNO actions. Both the Enfield P-17 and the BRNO actions are in turn based on the Magnum Mauser 98 rifle.

After World War II, with the dwindling of areas to hunt dangerous game animals, interest in the .416 Rigby cartridge and most big-bore Nitro Express cartridges began to wane. By the 1970s, with the demise of the British ammunition supplier Kynoch as an entity, the supply of .416 Rigby ammunition was dwindling, and many hunters, including Selby, set aside their .416 Rigby rifles, taking up the more popular .375 H&H Magnum, .458 Winchester Magnum, and .458 Lott.

Between 1912 and the beginning of World War II, John Rigby & Co. produced 169 .416 Rigby rifles and 180 between 1939 and 1984. Between 1984, when Paul Roberts took over the John Rigby & Co., and 1997, when the company was purchased by Geoff Miller's investment group, 184 more rifles were produced. It was not until Bill Ruger of Sturm, Ruger & Co. began offering the Ruger Model 77 RSM Magnum Mk II in 1991 that the cartridge finally took off. Ruger produced approximately 1,000 rifles between 1991 and 2001, dramatically boosting the number of .416 Rigby rifles in circulation.

With renewed interest in dangerous-game hunting in Africa, the demand for big-game cartridges increased. Major ammunition manufacturers like Norma, Federal, and Hornady began producing .416 Rigby ammunition to meet the new demand. The Kynoch brand name was licensed by Eley to Kynamco, a British ammunition manufacturer, based in Suffolk, England, which continues to manufacture .416 Rigby ammunition under the Kynoch brand name.

== Design and specifications ==
The .416 Rigby cartridge case is one of the most voluminous cases and was originally designed to utilize cordite strands as a propellant. The large case allowed the .416 Rigby to operate at moderate pressures, yet turn in good performance with regard to velocity and energy. The .416 Rigby was intended for use in Africa and India. As cordite was susceptible to high chamber-pressure variations depending on ambient temperature, the relatively moderate pressure loading of the .416 Rigby provided a safety margin against dangerously high pressure levels when used in tropical regions.

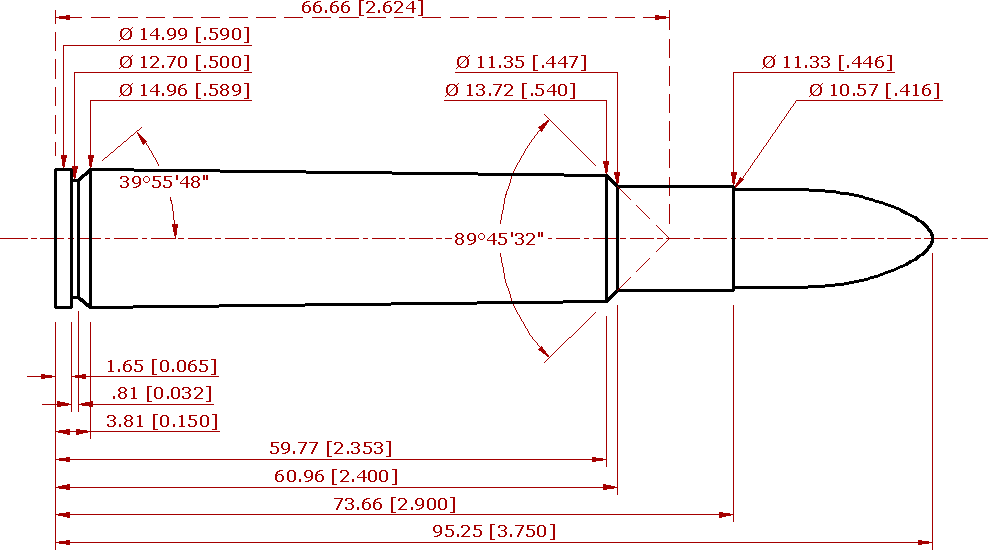
.416 Rigby CIP cartridge dimensions - all dimensions in mm (in)

The .416 Rigby's dimensions and specifications are governed by C.I.P. The C.I.P. mandates a 6-groove barrel with a bore diameter of 10.36 mm (0.408 in) and a groove diameter of 10.57 mm (0.416 in), with each groove 3.60 mm (0.142 in) wide, and a twist rate of 420 mm (16.54 in). Commencement of rifling is to begin at 7.62 mm (0.300 in). Maximum average pressure given by C.I.P. is 325.00 MPa (47,137 psi) for this cartridge.

SAAMI has listed the .416 Rigby, and there are no discrepancies between SAAMI and C.I.P. regarding the case and chamber dimension specifications for the .416 Rigby cartridge. Maximum average pressure given by SAAMI is 358.53 MPa (52,000 psi). Most ammunition manufacturers in the US are offering the .416 Rigby for hunting Dangerous Game and the cartridge is becoming popular once again.

== Performance ==
The original ammunition for the .416 Rigby used cordite as a propellant, firing a full metal jacket or soft-point round nose bullet weighing 27 g (410 gr) at 700 m/s (2,300 ft/s) generating 6,375 J (4,702 ft⋅lbf) . The current standard using smokeless powder is a 26 g (400 gr) bullet at 730 m/s (2,400 ft/s), generating 6,935 J (5,115 ft⋅lbf). This is the standard to which Federal, Hornady, Nosler, and Winchester load their ammunition. In its original configuration, the .416 Rigby compares favorably with its close counterparts of the era: the .404 Jeffery, and .425 Westley Richards. The .416 Rigby loaded with the 26 g (400 gr) bullet at 736 m/s (2,415 ft/s) as the Hornady's DGS and DGX ammunition are, has an MPBR of 181 m (198 yd). The cartridge is capable of producing over 5,400 J (4,000 ft⋅lbf) of energy at a range of 100 m (110 yd). In comparison, the typical .458 Winchester Magnum firing a 32 g (500 gr) bullet at 620 m/s (2,050 ft/s) manages to stay above the 5,400 J (4,000 ft⋅lbf) just past the 46 m (50 yd) mark.

Since the late 1980s, several .416 cartridges have come to the market. Among these, the .416 Remington Magnum, the .416 Ruger, and the .416 Weatherby Magnum have garnered the most attention of the firearms press. Both the Remington and Ruger cartridges were designed to fire a 26 g (400 gr) bullet at over 730 m/s (2,400 ft/s) to emulate the performance level of .416 Rigby. When loaded to their respective maximum average pressure level, both the Rigby and Remington cartridges are capable of driving the 26 g (400 gr) bullet at over 760 m/s (2,500 ft/s). However, the Rigby cartridge is loaded to the relatively low maximum allowable pressure of 325 MPa (47,100 psi) while the Remington cartridge has a stipulated maximum average pressure of 430 MPa (62,000 psi). The case capacity of the .416 Remington Magnum is about 82% to that of the .416 Rigby. The larger case of the .416 Rigby allows the cartridge to generate the same velocity and energy as that of the .416 Remington Magnum but does so at far lower pressure levels. Unlike the Remington and Rigby cartridges, the .416 Ruger, due to its case having even less capacity than the Remington, operates at near its peak allowable pressure to emulate the performance of the Rigby and Remington cartridges' factory ammunition. The .416 Weatherby Magnum, which uses a case of similar size as the Rigby, is capable of launching the same bullet at 820 m/s (2,700 ft/s).

== Sporting use ==
When designed in 1911, the .416 Rigby was intended for use against dangerous game in Africa and India. The original 27 g (410 gr) bullet has a sectional density of .338 and at a velocity of 700 m/s (2,300 ft/s) generated 6,375 J (4,702 ft⋅lbf). The energy generated by the cartridge was on par with that of .450 Nitro Express which, until the ban on the 11.6 mm (0.458 in) caliber in India and the Sudan in the early 1900s, had been the standard of measure for dangerous game rifles. The .416 Rigby would go on to become one of the most successful dangerous game cartridges designed for a magazine rifle.

Jack O'Connor used a .416 Rigby on his African safari and successfully took elephant and lion with it. Professional hunters such as John "Pondoro" Taylor, David Enderly Blunt and Harry Selby used the cartridge extensively for the hunting and culling of dangerous games such as elephant, rhino and Cape buffalo. A famous Kenyan professional hunter, J. A. Hunter, provided a testimonial to John Rigby & Company stating:

You will be pleased to know that the rifle which accounted for all the rogue lions on my last hunting expedition was the .416 Bore Magazine Rifle you supplied me with. I cannot speak too highly of it. Its stopping power was extraordinary, and the fact that all the lions, rhino, buffalo, etc., were shot at comparatively short range, and no other rifle to back me up, speaks volumes for the accuracy and efficiency of your rifle.

Today the .416 Rigby is favored by professional hunters and safari guides in Africa.

While considered overpowered for the big cats, the .416 is regularly used for the hunting of these felines. In African nations which have enforced a ban on the use of sub 10.2 mm (0.400 in) rifle cartridge for dangerous game, the .416 Rigby can be considered for the hunting of lion or leopard. Prior to the ban on hunting in India, the .416 Rigby was successfully used to hunt dangerous game there which included the Bengal tiger, Indian rhino, and elephant.

== As a parent cartridge ==
The .416 Rigby cartridge case is of a unique design in that it had no prior cartridge case acting as a parent cartridge during its development. Due to the volume of the case, the .416 Rigby case has gone on to act as a parent cartridge to several modern cartridges and provide the inspiration to many others. The .378 Weatherby Magnum family of cartridges which include the .30-378, .338-378, .378, .416 and the .460 Weatherby Magnums use a case similar to the .416 Rigby albeit with a belt added to the case design.

The .416 Rigby is the parent cartridge for the following cartridges:

=== .300 Lapua Magnum ===
The .300 Lapua Magnum cartridge was designed by Lapua of Finland using the .338 Lapua Magnum case which in turn was based on the .416 Rigby. Lapua does not manufacture ammunition for the cartridge and it should be considered a wildcat cartridge.

=== .338 Lapua Magnum ===
The .338 Lapua Magnum cartridge is a redesign by Lapua of a prior designed by Research Armament Industries (RAI) and Brass Extrusion Labs Ltd. (BELL) known as the .338/416. The Lapua uses a modified .416 case shortened and necked down to accept a 8.59-millimetre (0.338 in) bullet. The cartridge is capable of firing a 15.0 g (231 gr) bullet at 920 m/s (3,000 ft/s).

=== .450 Dakota ===
The .450 Dakota was designed by Don Allen of Dakota Arms. It is virtually identical to the .450 Rigby which it predates by a few years. The cartridge is based on the .416 Rigby necked up to 11.6 mm (0.458 in). The .450 Dakota fires a 32 g (500 gr) bullet at 780 m/s (2,550 ft/s).

=== .450 Rigby ===
The .450 Rigby was designed by Paul Roberts of John Rigby & Company. The cartridge was designed to fire a 31 g (480 gr) bullet at 725 m/s (2,378 ft/s).

=== .510 Whisper ===
The .510 Whisper is a subsonic rifle cartridge developed by SSK Industries for use in suppressed rifles, with the noise similar to that of a .22 Short.^{[2]} It fires a .51-caliber bullet weighing 750 gr (49 g) at roughly 1,050 ft/s (320 m/s).

== See also ==
- .416 Remington Magnum
- .416 Ruger
- .416 Weatherby Magnum
- .450 Rigby
- .510 Whisper
- 10 mm caliber
- Big five game
- List of rifle cartridges
- Table of handgun and rifle cartridges
