= .450 Rigby =

Rifle cartridge

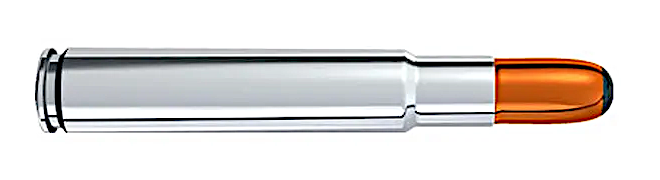
- Type: Rifle
- Place of origin: United Kingdom

Production history
- Designer: Paul Roberts
- Designed: 1994
- Manufacturer: John Rigby & Co.
- Produced: 1995–present
- Variants: .450 Dakota

Specifications
- Parent case: .416 Rigby
- Case type: Rimless bottleneck
- Bullet diameter: 11.68 mm (0.460 in)
- Neck diameter: 12.38 mm (0.487 in)
- Shoulder diameter: 12.50 mm (0.492 in)
- Base diameter: 14.96 mm (0.589 in)
- Rim thickness: 1.65 mm (0.065 in)
- Case length: 73.50 mm (2.894 in)
- Overall length: 95.25 mm (3.750 in)
- Case capacity: 8.63 cm^{3} (133.2 gr H_{2}O)
- Rifling twist: 420 mm (1 in 16.5")
- Primer type: Large rifle (magnum)
- Maximum pressure: 400.00 MPa (58,015 psi)

Ballistic performance
Bullet mass/type	Velocity	Energy
480 gr (31 g) RN/FMJ	2,378 ft/s (725 m/s)	6,288 ft⋅lbf (8,525 J)
500 gr (32 g) Solid	2,500 ft/s (760 m/s)	6,941 ft⋅lbf (9,411 J)
550 gr (36 g) FMJ	2,100 ft/s (640 m/s)	5,387 ft⋅lbf (7,304 J)
500 gr (32 g) Nosler partition	2,350 ft/s (720 m/s)	6,130 ft⋅lbf (8,310 J)
- Test barrel length: 26; Sources: Kynoch/Kynamco, Norma, Nosler

The .450 Rigby is a rifle cartridge designed in 1994 by John Rigby & Co. for the purpose of hunting large, thick-skinned dangerous African game animals. The cartridge is essentially a .416 Rigby necked up to accept a .458 in (11.6 mm) bullet, although with a higher operating pressure and much of the original taper removed. It is intended for use in magazine rifles. The cartridge should not be confused with .450 Nitro Express, introduced by Rigby in 1898, which is a rimmed cartridge of lesser performance intended for use in double and single shot rifles.

== History ==
In 1993, Paul Roberts (at that time proprietor of John Rigby & Company) embarked on an elephant hunt in the Zambezi Valley. Both he and his professional hunter, Joseph Wright, were armed with .416 Rigby rifles. An unhappy incident followed in which multiple rounds were required to harvest an elephant.

Paul Roberts felt that a cartridge with a greater bullet-weight and a larger caliber would have been more effective in the scenario. Once he returned to the United Kingdom, he necked-up the .416 Rigby case to .458 caliber, resulting in a cartridge remarkably similar dimensionally to the older .460 Weatherby Magnum. The new cartridge fired a .458 in (11.6 mm) bullet weighing 480 gr (31 g) at a velocity of 2,378 ft/s (725 m/s) from a 25 in (635 mm) barrel. It was named the .450 Rigby in 1994 and put into production in 1995. John Rigby & Co. already constructed .416 Rigby rifles, and adding the .450 Rigby to their catalog required minimal adjustments, as the two cartridges are dimensionally quite similar.

== Cartridge dimensions ==
.450 Rigby specifications are established by the C.I.P. international organisation, which sets standards for safety testing of firearms.

The .450 Rigby has an 8.63 ml (133 gr H_{2}O) cartridge case capacity.

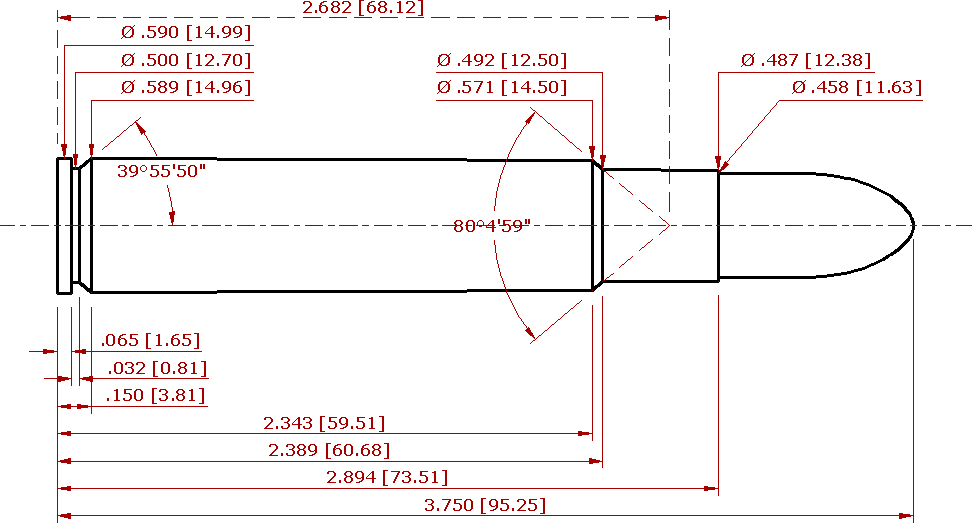

.450 Rigby maximum C.I.P. cartridge dimensions. All sizes in millimeters (mm) and inches (in).

The common rifling twist rate for this cartridge is 420 mm (1 in 16.54 in), 6 grooves, Ø lands = 11.43 mm (0.450 in), Ø grooves = 11.63 mm (0.458 in), land width = 3.60 mm (0.142 in), and the primer type is large rifle.

According to the official C.I.P. rulings, the .450 Rigby can be loaded at pressures up to 400.00 MPa (58,015 psi) P_{max} piezo pressure. In C.I.P. regulated countries every rifle cartridge combination must be proofed at 125% of maximum C.I.P. pressure to certify sale to consumers. This means that .450 Rigby chambered arms in C.I.P. regulated countries are proof tested at 500.00 MPa (72,519 psi) PE piezo pressure.

== Performance ==
.450 Rigby specifications call for a somewhat lower maximum pressure level than the .458 Winchester Magnum, .458 Lott, or .460 Weatherby Magnum. The maximum operating pressure limit ruled by the C.I.P. is given at 4,000 bar (58,000 psi). At this pressure, the cartridge readily achieves the intended 2,300–2,400 ft/s (700–730 m/s) with a 500-grain (32 g) bullet. A load that produces safe pressures in cold or moderate climates may generate pressures in excess of P_{max} in conditions of elevated heat, which can lead to extraction difficulties. A cartridge's maximum pressure specification does not necessitate that all loadings for it generate maximum pressure, however, and loads responsibly developed will not develop excessive pressure in warm climates.

Unlike the .458 Winchester Magnum and .458 Lott, a 500-grain (32 g) bullet can be loaded to 2,500 ft/s (760 m/s) in the .450 Rigby without exceeding acceptable pressures. Such loads generate formidable recoil from standard weight rifles when unequipped with effective muzzle brakes, however.

Among commercial sporting cartridges, only the .460 Weatherby Magnum offers a performance advantage over the .450 Rigby, at least in the .458-inch diameter.

== Sporting Use ==
The .450 Rigby was designed primarily to harvest heavy, thick-skinned dangerous game animals in Africa. When hunting such game, it is important to consider the velocity rating of the bullets utilized. The .450 Rigby is capable of exceeding the range of velocities within which many .458 caliber (11.6 mm) bullets are designed to function. This is especially true for traditional soft-nosed bullets, but it is not a concern for contemporary "non-conventional" designs offered by companies such as Cutting Edge Bullets and North Fork Bullets.

== .450 Dakota ==
The .450 Dakota is dimensionally similar to the .450 Rigby, though it predates the latter cartridge by a few years. The Dakota cartridge was designed by Don Allen and is likewise derived from the .416 Rigby. The .450 Dakota is considered a proprietary cartridge, the rights to which are owned by Dakota Arms Inc., Remington Arms Company and the Freedom Group family of companies. Neither CIP nor SAAMI regulate this cartridge. While dimensions of the cartridges are similar, they are neither identical nor interchangeable, due to differences in shoulder dimensions, case length, and operating pressure.

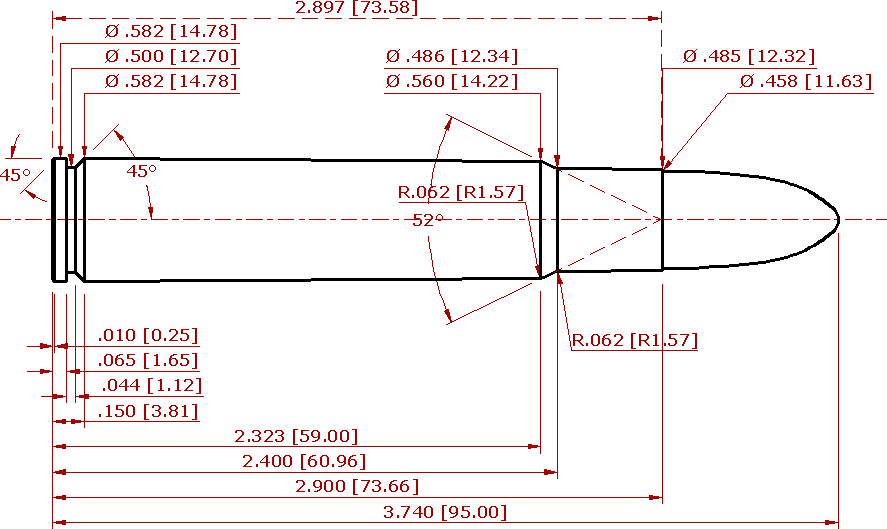
Schematic of the .450 Dakota. All dimensions in inches [millimeters].

The .450 Dakota launches a 500 gr (32 g) at 2,550 ft/s (780 m/s), a 550 gr (36 g) at 2,450 ft/s (750 m/s) and a 600 gr (39 g) at 2,350 ft/s (720 m/s). The .450 Dakota should be considered the ballistic equivalent of the .460 Weatherby Magnum from the standpoint of power and operating pressure. .450 Rigby performance tends to be somewhat lower, due to the 4,000 bar (58,000 psi) P_{max} stipulated by the CIP.

The .450 Dakota is no longer manufactured, and neither rifles, ammunition, nor brass cases are readily available for the round.
