= .458 Express =

Rifle cartridge

- Type: Hunting
- Place of origin: South Africa

Production history
- Designer: Professor Koos Badenhorst

Specifications
- Case type: Straight wall, belted
- Bullet diameter: .458 in (11.6 mm)
- Overall length: 2.99 in (76 mm)
- Case capacity: 111 gr H_{2}O (7.2 cm^{3})

The .458 Express is a .458 diameter (caliber) cartridge developed in South Africa. It is also referred to as the .458 3-inch.

Other .458 cartridges are the very popular .458 Lott, .458 Winchester Magnum and 450 Watts. Weatherby made the .460 Weatherby which is still one of the fastest commercial cartridges available on the market in this category.

This unique cartridge originated in Africa, accommodating harsh African conditions, and less efficient South African rifle powders. It has a broad spectrum of reloading options and is capable of long-range, flat trajectory shooting, or close-up Big Five hunting shots, using the heaviest of bullets available in this caliber.

== Development ==
A range of .458 caliber cartridges have been developed since the 1950s; the .458 Express being developed in 2000 . The .458 Express is developed in South Africa by Professor Koos Badenhorst of Haenertsburg in the Limpopo province of South Africa.

== Technical information ==
=== The case ===
The .458 Express uses a straight wall belted case as seen in the .458 Winchester Magnum (458 Win Mag). The case length is 2.99 inches (76 mm) compared to the 2.50 inches (64 mm) of the .458 Winchester Magnum and the 2.80-inch (71 mm) case of the .458 Lott. See "Cartridges of the World - 10th Edition"

=== Case Capacity ===
The volume of water contained in a .458 Express case is 111 grains compared to the 103 grains of the .458 Lott and 92 grains of water in the .458 Winchester Magnum case.

=== Caliber ===
.458 diameter bullets are used in the .458 Express. The .458 Express is described by K Robertson in "Africa's Most Dangerous". He is also the author of "The Perfect Shot".

== Permission ==
All rights for publication was obtained from Prof. Koos Badenhorst as the developer and architect of the .458 Express.

=== The .458 Express Story ===
ISBN 978-0-620-42754-8 Author: Werner Booysen. In this book the history of the .458 Express, development of the caliber and other interesting information are discussed.
