= .416 Remington Magnum =

Rifle cartridge

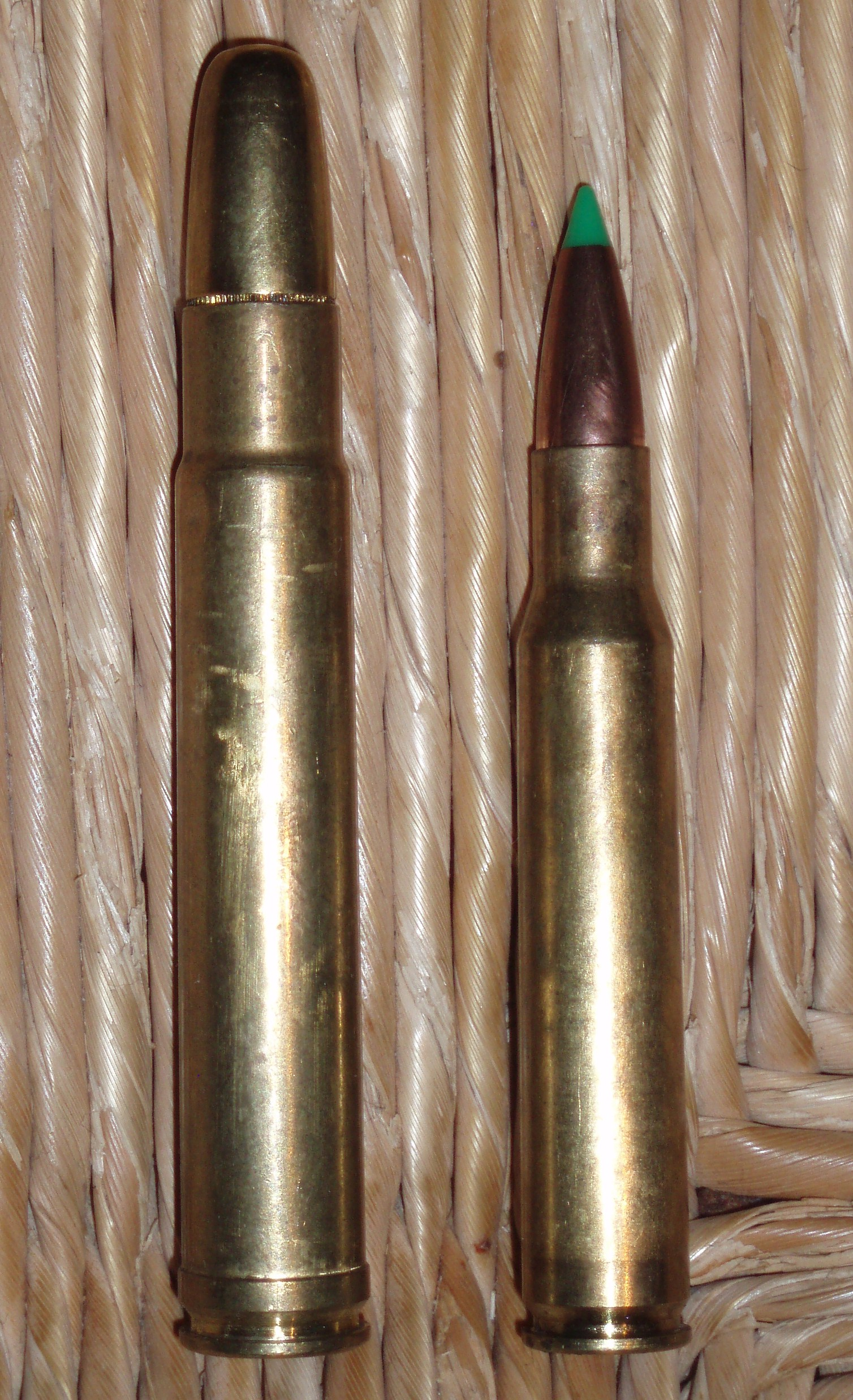
- .416 Remington Magnum and a .30-06 Springfield
- Type: Rifle
- Place of origin: United States

Production history
- Designer: Remington
- Designed: 1988
- Manufacturer: Remington
- Produced: 1989–present
- Variants: .416 Barnes Supreme & .416 Hoffman

Specifications
- Parent case: 8mm Remington Magnum
- Case type: Belted, bottleneck
- Bullet diameter: .416 in (10.6 mm)
- Neck diameter: .447 in (11.4 mm)
- Shoulder diameter: .487 in (12.4 mm)
- Base diameter: .513 in (13.0 mm)
- Rim diameter: .532 in (13.5 mm)
- Rim thickness: .050 in (1.3 mm)
- Case length: 2.850 in (72.4 mm)
- Overall length: 3.600 in (91.4 mm)
- Rifling twist: 1-14"
- Primer type: Large rifle magnum
- Maximum pressure (SAAMI): 65,000 psi (450 MPa)

Ballistic performance
Bullet mass/type	Velocity	Energy
350 gr (23 g) Lead FN	2,267 ft/s (691 m/s)	3,995 ft⋅lbf (5,416 J)
350 gr (23 g) X	2,645 ft/s (806 m/s)	5,438 ft⋅lbf (7,373 J)
400 gr (26 g) RN	2,449 ft/s (746 m/s)	5,328 ft⋅lbf (7,224 J)
- Test barrel length: 24"; Source: Accurate Powder

The .416 Remington Magnum is a .416 caliber (10.57 mm) cartridge of belted bottlenecked design. The cartridge was intended as a dangerous game hunting cartridge and released to the public in 1989. The cartridge uses the case of the 8 mm Remington Magnum as a parent cartridge. When the cartridge was released in 1988, author Frank C. Barnes considered the .416 Remington Magnum to be the "most outstanding factory cartridge introduced in decades".

The cartridge was conceived as a less costly alternative to the .416 Rigby cartridge and was intended to replace the latter. While today the .416 Remington Magnum is considered in the field the most popular of the .416 cartridges, the .416 Remington did not replace the .416 Rigby as had been anticipated. Rather, it sparked a renewed interest in the .416 caliber (10.57 mm) cartridges which led to the revival of the .416 Rigby and the introduction of other .416 cartridges such as the .416 Weatherby Magnum and the .416 Ruger.

The .416 Remington Magnum is one of the more popular dangerous game cartridges used for the hunting of dangerous game in Africa. It also has been increasingly used in North America, Alaska in particular, for the hunting of and as a defense against large bears.

== History and origins ==
=== Background ===
As former European colonies in Africa gained independence, safari hunting on the continent began a slow decline due to resource mismanagement and political factors. This, in turn, led to a decline in interest in big bore rifles and cartridges used to hunt dangerous African game species. However, by the 1980s African nations recognizing the potential benefits, began developing areas as hunting and safari destinations. As interest in safari hunting in Africa increased, so did interest in dangerous game rifles.

=== Earlier cartridges ===
Early on, .416 Rigby had been one of the most celebrated medium-bore magazine rifle cartridges during the heyday of African hunting. Today, loaded with modern smokeless powders, the .416 Rigby is considered a big-bore cartridge. The Rigby was a large, voluminous cartridge in comparison to most magazine rifle cartridges of its time, which had used cordite as a propellant and operated at medium pressures. Rifles chambered for the cartridge required not only longer actions but also oversized bolt faces, all of which increased the cost. Cartridges such as the .416 Rigby – which was considered an entry-level cartridge in countries which mandated 40 caliber (10 mm) cartridges – lost out to cartridges such as the .458 Winchester Magnum and the .375 H&H Magnum, which could be chambered in much less costly bolt-action rifles. As ammunition for the cartridge became scarce, professional hunters such as Selby put away their .416 Rigby rifles.

=== Later development ===
The renewed interest in safari hunting in North America beginning in the 1980s created a market for a specialized African cartridge. African nations mandated minimum caliber legislation beginning in the 1950s which mandated minimum calibers for dangerous game hunting. The minimum cartridges for hunting of dangerous game was set at either the .375 H&H Magnum or at the 40 caliber (10 mm) with a few countries allowing the 9.3 x 62 Mauser as an exception to the rule.

Remington realizing the opportunity designed what was to become the second dangerous game cartridge to originate in the United States to be commercialized – the first being the .458 Winchester Magnum. The introduction of the .416 Remington Magnum by Remington led to renewal of interest in the .416 caliber (10.57 mm). This in turn resulted in resurrection of the .416 Rigby cartridge when Ruger released the Ruger Model 77 RSM rifle chambered for the cartridge while Hornady began manufacturing .416 Rigby ammunition. Weatherby was to follow Remington's lead soon after, releasing the .416 Weatherby Magnum which was based on its .378 Weatherby Magnum cartridge.

=== Origins ===
The design of the .416 Remington Magnum can be traced to wildcat cartridges like the .416 Hoffman cartridge of the 1970s and the .416 Barnes Supreme of the 1950s. George L. Hoffman of Sonora Texas solution to having a .416 in (10.6 mm) chamber in a common rifle action was to neck up an improved .375 H&H Magnum case to .416 in (10.6 mm). The new cartridge named the .416 Hoffman was introduced in the late 1970s. The .416 Hoffman was mainly chambered in custom rifles.

Remington realizing that a new market had opened, designed the .416 Remington Magnum cartridge to compete with the .458 Winchester Magnum, .375 H&H Magnum and the .416 Rigby. The Remington cartridge had a striking resemblance to the .416 Hoffman. The new cartridge, unlike the Rigby, could easily be chambered in pre-existing rifle models such as the Remington Model 700, Winchester's Model 70 and any rifle which could fire a belted magnum cartridge based on the .375 H&H Magnum. This avoided the need for a costly new action or redesign of pre-existing rifle models all of which would add to the cost of the rifle.

The .416 Remington like the .416 Hoffman uses an improved .375 H&H Magnum case as the starting point. The .416 Remington Magnum was based on the company's then fairly new 8 mm Remington Magnum which was necked up to accept a .416 in (10.6 mm) bullet. The 8 mm Remington Magnum in turn was based on the .375 H&H Magnum which improved by blowing out to reducing the taper and increasing case capacity and then necking it down to accept a .323 in (8.2 mm) bullet. The resulting .416 Remington Magnum emulated the performance of the .416 Rigby and the .416 Hoffman in that like the Rigby and the Hoffman it was capable of launching a 400 gr (26 g) bullet at 2,400 ft/s (730 m/s).

== Design and specifications ==
In designing the .416 Remington Magnum, Remington intended to emulate the performance of the .416 Rigby using the smaller case of the .375 H&H Magnum. To be able to reach this performance level, the smaller case would have to work at much higher pressures than the Rigby cartridge. However, the volume of the resulting case allowed for Remington to achieve the anticipated performance level rather easily without reaching its maximum pressure limit.

Remington chose to use the 8 mm Remington Magnum as a starting point when developing the new cartridge. The 8 mm Remington Magnum used a highly improved and strengthened case in comparison to the .375 H&H Magnum and it offered an increase in volume over the latter cartridge. Furthermore, the SAAMI working pressure of the 8 mm Remington Magnum's case was 65,000 psi (4,500 bar) which was higher than that of the .375 H&H Magnum. In the end .416 Remington Magnum was created by simply necking up the 8 mm Remington Magnum case with no other changes made to the case. Dimensionally, below the neck, the cases of both the 8 mm Remington Magnum and the .416 Remington Magnum are identical.

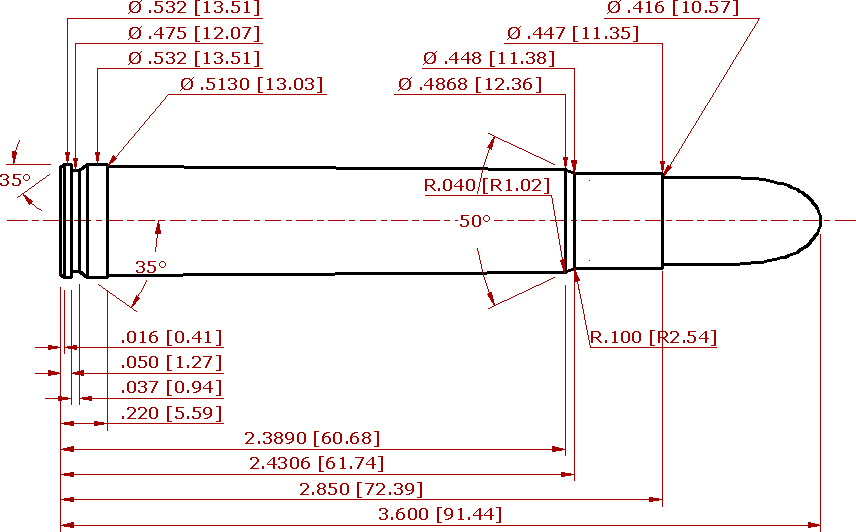
S.A.A.M.I. compliant .416 Remington Magnum cartridge schematic: All dimensions in inches [millimeters].

The .416 Remington Magnum was standardized in May 1989 by S.A.A.M.I. in North America. SAAMI recommends a 6 groove barrel with each groove having a width of .128 in (3.3 mm) and twist rate of one revolution in 14 in (360 mm). Recommended bore diameter is .408 in (10.4 mm) while the groove diameter is given as .416 in (10.6 mm). The case has a capacity of 107 gr. of water (6.95 cm^{3}). Maximum pressure given by SAAMI is 65,000 psi (4,500 bar) or 54,000 C.U.P.

The C.I.P. regulates the .416 Remington Magnum cartridge. No discrepancies exist between C.I.P. and S.A.A.M.I. published values regarding case dimensions; any discrepancies that may exist are due to rounding off when converting from inches to millimeters. However, the CIP provides a pressure rating of 4,300 bar (62,000 psi) for the cartridge. The C.U.P. pressure rating is the same as the S.A.A.M.I. pressure rating of 54,000 C.U.P.

== Performance ==
The .416 Remington Magnum was designed to emulate the performance of the .416 Rigby and by all evidence meets this design criterion. When loaded to within the pressure specification stipulated by SAAMI and the CIP, the cartridge can easily exceed this design criterion by about 100 ft/s (30 m/s). Held to within the respective pressure limits imposed on each of the cartridges by these organizations, the Rigby cartridge has little to no advantage in performance over the .416 Remington Magnum. In fact, to match the .416 Remington at its maximum pressure mandated by the CIP of 4,300 bar (62,000 psi) the .416 Rigby cartridge will require to be loaded to 3,600 bar (52,000 psi) exceeding the maximum pressure by 350 bar (5,100 psi). Factory manufactured ammunition for both these cartridges launch a 400 gr (26 g) bullet at 2,400 ft/s (730 m/s) while handloaded ammunition is able to drive the same bullet at about 2,500 ft/s (760 m/s).

When Ruger entered the .416 caliber (10.36 mm) fray, they did so with a cartridge shorter but internally fatter than the .416 Remington Magnum which was based on their .375 Ruger necked up to .416 in (10.6 mm). The cartridge was a co-development between Ruger and Hornady where Ruger developed the rifles and Hornady the ammunition. Compared to the .416 Ruger, the Remington cartridge has a greater case capacity and a higher S.A.A.M.I. recommended pressure level. This means that the Remington cartridge should perform better than the Ruger cartridge. The Hornady's .416 Ruger ammunition matches both the Rigby and Remington .416 cartridges it does so working close to its maximum pressure level using a specially blended powder unavailable to the public. Those who handload their ammunition will have some difficulty reaching the performance of the factory loaded ammunition while staying within the maximum average pressure rating of the cartridge. Data published by Hornady provide a velocity for the 400 gr (26 g) of 2,300 ft/s (700 m/s) for the .416 Ruger, 2,400 ft/s (730 m/s) for the Rigby, 2,450 ft/s (750 m/s) for the .416 Remington Magnum and 2,700 ft/s (820 m/s) for the .416 Weatherby.

The .416 Weatherby Magnum on the other hand is capable of a greater performance level than either the Remington, Rigby or Ruger cartridges. Factory ammunition is loaded to 2,700 ft/s (820 m/s) with the 400 gr (26 g) bullet. The .416 Weatherby Magnum uses a slighter more voluminous case than the Rigby cartridge and works at a higher C.I.P. pressure than the .416 Remington Magnum. The .416 Dakota uses a modified Rigby case and is able to attain 2,600 ft/s (790 m/s) using better quality brass than the Rigby cartridge at a higher pressure.

Factory loaded ammunition generates 5,115 ft⋅lbf (6,935 J) of energy at the muzzle. This exceeds the energy generated by most .458 Winchester Magnum factory ammunition which launch a 500 gr (32 g) bullet at 2,050 ft/s (620 m/s). Many experienced African hunters consider the .416 Remington a more flexible cartridge than the .458 Winchester Magnum.

Comparison of the factory loadings of the .458 Winchester Magnum, .375 H&H Magnum and the .416 Remington Magnum
Cartridge	Criteria	Muzzle	50-yard (46 m)	100-yard (91 m)	150-yard (140 m)	200-yard (180 m)	250-yard (230 m)	300-yard (270 m)
.458 Winchester Magnum Hornady 500 grains (32 g) DGS 85833	Velocity	2,140 ft/s (650 m/s)	2,007 ft/s (612 m/s)	1,879 ft/s (573 m/s)	1,757 ft/s (536 m/s)	1,641 ft/s (500 m/s)	1,531 ft/s (467 m/s)	1,429 ft/s (436 m/s)
.458 Winchester Magnum Hornady 500 grains (32 g) DGS 85833	Energy	5,084 ft⋅lbf (6,893 J)	4,472 ft⋅lbf (6,063 J)	3,921 ft⋅lbf (5,316 J)	3,428 ft⋅lbf (4,648 J)	2,990 ft⋅lbf (4,050 J)	2,603 ft⋅lbf (3,529 J)	2,267 ft⋅lbf (3,074 J)
.458 Winchester Magnum Hornady 500 grains (32 g) DGS 85833	Bullet drop	−1.5 in (−3.8 cm)	0.3 in (0.76 cm)	0 in (0 cm)	−2.8 in (−7.1 cm)	-8.4 in (21.33 cm)	−17.3 in (−44 cm)	−29.8 in (−76 cm)
.375 H&H Magnum Hornady 300 grains (19 g) DGS 8509	Velocity	2,670 ft/s (810 m/s)	2,508 ft/s (764 m/s)	2,353 ft/s (717 m/s)	2,204 ft/s (672 m/s)	2,059 ft/s (628 m/s)	1,920 ft/s (590 m/s)	1,787 ft/s (545 m/s)
.375 H&H Magnum Hornady 300 grains (19 g) DGS 8509	Energy	4,749 ft⋅lbf (6,439 J)	4,191 ft⋅lbf (5,682 J)	3,688 ft⋅lbf (5,000 J)	3,234 ft⋅lbf (4,385 J)	2,823 ft⋅lbf (3,827 J)	2,455 ft⋅lbf (3,329 J)	2,127 ft⋅lbf (2,884 J)
.375 H&H Magnum Hornady 300 grains (19 g) DGS 8509	Bullet drop	−1.5 in (−3.8 cm)	−0.1 in (−0.25 cm)	0 in (0 cm)	−1.5 in (−3.8 cm)	-4.8 in (12.19 cm)	−10.2 in (−26 cm)	−17.9 in (−45 cm)
.416 Remington Magnum Hornady 400 grains (26 g) DGS 82674	Velocity	2,400 ft/s (730 m/s)	2,269 ft/s (692 m/s)	2,143 ft/s (653 m/s)	2,019 ft/s (615 m/s)	1,901 ft/s (579 m/s)	1,787 ft/s (545 m/s)	1,678 ft/s (511 m/s)
.416 Remington Magnum Hornady 400 grains (26 g) DGS 82674	Energy	5,116 ft⋅lbf (6,936 J)	4,574 ft⋅lbf (6,202 J)	4,077 ft⋅lbf (5,528 J)	3,622 ft⋅lbf (4,911 J)	3,208 ft⋅lbf (4,349 J)	2,835 ft⋅lbf (3,844 J)	2,500 ft⋅lbf (3,400 J)
.416 Remington Magnum Hornady 400 grains (26 g) DGS 82674	Bullet drop	−1.5 in (−3.8 cm)	0.1 in (0.25 cm)	0 in (0 cm)	-2.0 in (5.08 cm)	−6.1 in (−15 cm)	−12.7 in (−32 cm)	−21.9 in (−56 cm)
Values courtesy of the Hornady Ballistic Calculator Altitude: 500 ft (150 m) Temperature: 90 °F (32 °C)

It is evident that the .416 Remington Magnum is a ballistically superior cartridge to the .458 Winchester Magnum and has a trajectory close to that of the .375 H&H Magnum. While the .458 Winchester Magnum retains4,000 ft⋅lbf (5,400 J) to about the 65 yd (59 m) the .416 Remington Magnum carries that energy level beyond the 100 yd (91 m) mark. The cartridge is flatter shooting than the .458 Winchester Magnum. When zeroed for 100 yd (91 m) the .416 Remington Magnum drops about5.0 in (13 cm) at 200 yd (180 m) and will be about 22 in (56 cm) low at 300 yd (270 m). The .458 Winchester Magnum in contrast will be 6 in (15 cm) low at 200 yd (180 m) and 30 in (76 cm) low at 300 yd (270 m). This ability to retain a usable energy level to farther ranges makes the .416 a far more flexible cartridge and therefore a more useful cartridge than the .458 Winchester Magnum.

As with any big bore rifle cartridge recoil is a consideration. In a 10 lb (4.5 kg) the .416 Remington Magnum will generate about 54 ft⋅lbf (73 J) of recoil energy at velocity of 18.6 ft/s (5.7 m/s). In comparison, a .458 Winchester Magnum firing a 500 gr (32 g) bullet at 2,150 ft/s (660 m/s) will generate about 61 ft⋅lbf (83 J) of recoil energy at velocity of 19.7 ft/s (6.0 m/s) in a similar weighted rifle.

== Rifles ==
When the .416 Remington Magnum was released to the public in 1989 it was available in three Remington Model 700 Safari rifle models including the then just released Model 700 Safari KS rifle. When the Model 700 Safari KS was relegated to the Remington Custom Shop, Remington continued offer the .416 Remington Magnum in this rifle model but dropped the two walnut stocked rifles in this chambering. Remington later discontinued the .416 Remington Magnum in the Safari KS model and instead switched to the Hunter Series Model 700 ABG (African Big Game) Rifle which sports a wood laminate stock. Today, Remington no longer offers the .416 Remington as an over the counter chambering.

In 1994 the Winchester Model 70 returned to an updated version of the Pre-'64 type action featuring controlled round feed, full length claw extractor, fixed-type ejection and chambered the Super Express version (introduced in 1990 with the Post-'64 push feed action in 375 H&H Magnum, and .458 Winchester Magnum) in .416 Remington Magnum. In 2010 Winchester introduced the Model 70 Safari Express, manufactured (starting in 2008) for Winchester by Fabrique Nationale in Columbia, South Carolina that also featured the Pre-'64 type action and MOA Trigger, chambered in .375 H&H Magnum, .458 Winchester Magnum, and the .416 Remington Magnum. Mauser continues to offer the M03 Magnum rifle chambered for the cartridge. For those wanting an authentic Mauser 98 action type, Dumoulin Herstal chambers the cartridge in their Herstal Safari rifle. A-Square offers the Hannibal (right-handed) and Caesar (left-handed) rifles in the .416 Remington. The A-Square rifles are based on the P-14 Enfield design. Apart from these manufacturers several custom gunsmiths offer rifles chambered for this cartridge. The Blaser R8 is also chambered in .416 Remington.

Building custom rifles or having a rifle re-chambered for the. 416 Remington Magnum is a fairly straight-forward and easy option. Any rifle action which can handle the full length magnum cartridge such as. 375 H&H Magnum requires only a barrel change and perhaps some work on the magazine feed system. On the other hand, the larger Rigby and Weatherby cartridges would require an appropriate extra large magnum action as a starting point.

== Ammunition ==
The 400 gr (26 g) bullet at 2,400 ft/s (730 m/s) is the industry performance standard for the .416 Remington Magnum. Very few ammunition manufacturers offer bullet weights other than the 400 gr (26 g) bullet. Currently Conley Precision, Double Tap, Federal, Hornady, Norma, Remington and Winchester produce ammunition for rifles chambered for this cartridge. Currently only Conley Precision, Double Tap and Norma produce ammunition loaded with bullet weighing something other than 400 gr (26 g). However, the ammunition produced by these companies are generally available only through mail order (Conley Precision) or not commonly found throughout North America (Norma and Double Tap).

Federal provides five loaded cartridges in their Federal Premium line loaded with Barnes, Swift and Trophy Bonded bullets. Hornady offers a solid (DGS) and a controlled expansion bullet (DGX) as ammunition for the .416 Remington Magnum. Norma offers a solid and soft point ammunition loaded with Woodleigh 450 gr (29 g) bullets at 2,150 ft/s (660 m/s) in their PH line of ammunition. Remington offers a single load topped with a Swift A-Frame bullet while Winchester offers two loads in their Safari ammunition line using Nosler's Solid and Partition bullets. Double Tap offers four loads, a 300 gr (19 g) and 350 gr (23 g) Banes TSX bullets at 2,920 ft/s (890 m/s) and 2,725 ft/s (831 m/s) respectively, a 400 gr (26 g) Nosler Partition at 2,450 ft/s (750 m/s) and a 450 gr (29 g) Woodleigh Weldcore at 2,325 ft/s (709 m/s).

== Criticism ==
The .416 Remington Magnum has often been criticized for operating at higher pressures than the .416 Rigby with the assertion that these high pressures can cause difficulty in extracting spent casings in hot tropical environments. However, such claims appear to be speculative and remain for a large part unfounded. While the cartridge is loaded to higher pressures than the .416 Rigby, Remington loads the cartridge to lower than the maximum stipulated pressure level for the cartridge. Although the .416 Remington brass is known for its strength, Rigby brass quality varies from manufacturer to manufacturer and designed for the moderate working pressure of the Rigby cartridge as stipulate by the CIP and SAAMI. Furthermore, modern smokeless powders are less sensitive to ambient temperatures and are stable throughout the working temperature range. The Rigby cartridge had been designed for use with cordite, hence the large case volume and lower working pressures. Furthermore, cordite was highly sensitive to temperatures which gave rise to high pressures in the high ambient temperature environment of Africa and India. The Remington cartridge has always been loaded with modern smokeless powders, however, that is not true of the .416 Rigby which was originally loaded with cordite. Since cordite is temperature sensitive the Rigby cartridge was loaded to lower pressure levels.

== Variants ==
The .416 Hoffman uses an improved .375 H&H case necked up to accept a .416 inch bullet. The Hoffman cartridge is slightly larger than the .416 Remington Magnum in the neck and shoulder area and has a less taper. The Hoffman cartridge has a case capacity of 109.5 gr. of water (7.11 cm^{3}), about 2% greater than that of the .416 Remington Magnum. Consequently, a rifle which is chambered for the .416 Hoffman can fire a .416 Remington Magnum cartridge but not vice versa. The .416 Hoffman had been adopted by A-Square as a proprietary cartridge but later discontinued. The cartridge can be considered an improved .416 Remington Magnum if it had not predated the Remington cartridge by over a decade.

== See also ==
- .416 Rigby
- .416 Ruger
- .416 Taylor
- .416 Weatherby Magnum
- 10 mm caliber
- List of rifle cartridges
- Table of handgun and rifle cartridges
