= .416 Weatherby Magnum =

Rifle cartridge

- Type: Rifle/Dangerous Game
- Place of origin: South Gate CA USA

Production history
- Designer: Weatherby
- Designed: 1989
- Manufacturer: Weatherby
- Produced: 1989–present

Specifications
- Parent case: .378 Weatherby Magnum
- Case type: Belted, bottleneck
- Bullet diameter: .416 in (10.6 mm)
- Neck diameter: .444 in (11.3 mm)
- Shoulder diameter: .561 in (14.2 mm)
- Base diameter: .582 in (14.8 mm)
- Rim diameter: .579 in (14.7 mm)
- Rim thickness: .252 in (6.4 mm)
- Case length: 2.913 in (74.0 mm)
- Overall length: 3.750 in (95.3 mm)
- Case capacity: 140 gr H_{2}O (9.1 cm^{3})
- Rifling twist: 1 in 14 in (360 mm)
- Primer type: Large rifle (magnum)
- Maximum pressure: 65,000 psi (450 MPa)

Ballistic performance
Bullet mass/type	Velocity	Energy
350 gr (23 g) X	2,880 ft/s (880 m/s)	6,448 ft⋅lbf (8,742 J)
400 gr (26 g) RN	2,700 ft/s (820 m/s)	6,474 ft⋅lbf (8,778 J)
- Test barrel length: 26"; Source(s): Weatherby ballistics page

The .416 Weatherby Magnum is a belted, bottlenecked cartridge designed by Ed Weatherby and launched commercially in 1989. It is a dangerous-game cartridge intended for the hunting of heavy dangerous game such as elephant and African Cape buffalo. It is considered the most powerful commercial .416 cartridge, besting the Remington, Rigby and Ruger .416s by a velocity of 300 ft/s (91 m/s). Unlike earlier Weatherby cartridges which were designed by Roy Weatherby, this cartridge was designed by his son Ed Weatherby.

Beginning in the 1960s and through the 1970s, safari hunting in Africa was on the decline, and in turn demand for big-bore cartridges waned. Furthermore, the introduction of the .458 Winchester Magnum, which could be chambered in inexpensive rifles, further put a nail in the coffin of other big-bore cartridges such as the .416 Rigby, which required an oversized rifle action. Due to the lack of interest, ammunition manufacturers like Kynoch ceased operations.

However, by the 1980s, a renewed interest in safari hunting created a demand for big-bore dangerous-game cartridges. In 1988 Remington stepped up to the plate with their iteration of the .416 Hoffman, which was given the name .416 Remington Magnum. Unlike the Rigby, the Remington cartridge utilized the .375 H&H Magnum case and therefore, unlike the .416 Rigby, could be chambered in most firearm actions.

Taking advantage of this momentum, Weatherby introduced their own .416 cartridge in 1989; it was based on the .378 Weatherby Magnum cartridge, which was necked up to accept a .416 in (10.6 mm) bullet.

== Design ==
In traditional Weatherby fashion, a Weatherby cartridge would outclass similar-caliber cartridges with regard to the performance of the cartridge. To accomplish this task Weatherby relied on one of the largest commercial sporting cartridge cases available. The .416 Weatherby Magnum uses the same case as the .378 Weatherby Magnum and the .460 Weatherby Magnum. The case design was inspired by the .416 Rigby cartridge and features a belt and Weatherby's signature double-radius venturi shoulder. Unlike the .416 Ruger and the .416 Remington, the .416 Weatherby Magnum requires an extra-large bolt face and large magnum action to contain the cartridge due to its oversized dimensions. Putting this in perspective, the .416 Weatherby Magnum has a case capacity of 140 gr. of water (9.09 cm^{3}), an increase of 31% over that of the .416 Remington Magnum case.

The .416 Weatherby Magnum has been standardized by both the CIP and SAAMI. SAAMI recommends a 6-grooved barrel with a bore Ø of .408 in (10.4 mm) and a groove Ø of .416 in (10.6 mm) with a twist rate of one revolution in 14 in (360 mm). Weatherby's pressure rating is 65,000 psi (4,500 bar); however; Weatherby's own factory ammunition is loaded to lower pressure levels than this maximum. As with other Weatherby cartridges, there are discrepancies between SAAMI and CIP dimensions. This is arises from the CIP's treatment of the double-venturi case, shoulder and neck area of the cartridge. the CIP attempts to treat the shoulder as a conventional shoulder with transitional radius between each of the segments.

== See also ==
- 10 mm caliber
- List of rifle cartridges
