= 458th =

458th may refer to:

- 458th Air Expeditionary Group, a provisional United States Air Force unit assigned to the United States Air Forces in Europe
- 458th Airlift Squadron (458 AS), part of the 375th Airlift Wing at Scott Air Force Base, Illinois
- 458th Tactical Fighter Squadron, an inactive United States Air Force unit
- No. 458 Squadron RAAF, Royal Australian Air Force

== See also ==
- 458 (disambiguation)
- .458
