= .308×1.5-inch Barnes =

Wildcat cartridge based on the .308 Winchester

.308×1.5" Barnes
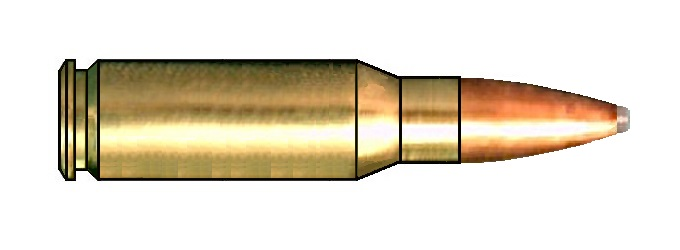
- Type: Rifle
- Place of origin: USA

Production history
- Designer: Frank Barnes
- Designed: 1961
- Variants: .30 BR

Specifications
- Parent case: .308 Winchester (7.62×51mm NATO)
- Case type: Rimless bottlenecked
- Bullet diameter: .308
- Neck diameter: .338
- Shoulder diameter: .450
- Base diameter: .466
- Rim diameter: .470
- Rim thickness: .048
- Case length: 1.500
- Overall length: 2.05 in (52 mm)
- Case capacity: 38.0 gr H_{2}O (2.46 cm^{3})
- Rifling twist: 12
- Primer type: Large rifle
- Maximum pressure: Approximately 60,000 psi (4,100 bar)

Ballistic performance
Bullet mass/type	Velocity	Energy
150 gr (10 g) spitzer	2,500 ft/s (760 m/s)	2,082 ft⋅lbf (2,823 J)

The .308×1.5" Barnes is a wildcat cartridge based on the .308 Winchester (7.62×51mm NATO). The cartridge is similar to the 7.62×39mm Russian (M43) cartridge though it outperforms the Soviet cartridge. It was designed by Frank C. Barnes in March 1961 by shortening the .308 Winchester to 1.5 in (38 mm) and giving it a shoulder angle of 20° (α=40°) similar to the parent cartridge.

== History ==
The first rifles commissioned for the developmental work by Barnes for the .308×1.5" cartridge were a Swedish Model 96 Mauser with a 1 in 12 (305 mm) twist built by Les Corbet and a Remington Rolling Block with a 1 in 10 (254 mm) twist built by P.O. Ackley. Due to the weights of the bullet and the performance of the cartridge, the 1 in 12 twist became the standard by consensus.

== Similar cartridges ==
Apart from experimenting with .308×1.75", the legacy of the Barnes cartridge is found in its progeny cartridges. The .308×1.5" caused a wildcatting craze, which had individuals necking the cartridge down to .224 (5.56 mm), .243 (6 mm), .264 (6.5 mm), .284 (7 mm) and necking up to .338 (8.5 mm) and .375 (9.5 mm). Due to the cartridges' efficiency and accuracy, many of these cartridges, such as the .22 BR, 6mm BR, 6mm BR Norma, 7mm BR, and .30 BR, went on to become popular benchrest cartridges and some of these were adopted by mainstream ammunition manufacturers. The .308×1.5" was one of the original short fat cartridge designs, having a length to width ratio of 3.17. The short fat cartridge design is considered to promote efficiency and shot to shot consistency.

The .308×1.5" Barnes cartridge is comparable to cartridges such as the 7.62×39mm and the .30-30 Winchester. The .308×1.5" is capable of launching a 150 gr (9.7 g) bullet at 2,500 ft/s (760 m/s). While the Barnes and 7.62×39 are similar length, the Barnes has a greater body girth, which provides a greater propellant capacity which in turn contributes to its performance advantage. While the .30-30 Winchester has about a 16% greater capacity over the Barnes cartridge, the .30-30 has a SAAMI-recommended pressure limit of 42,000 psi (2,900 bar). For this reason, most factory .30-30 ammunition loaded with a 150 gr (9.7 g) bullet achieves a mere 2,390 ft/s (730 m/s). Furthermore, the Barnes cartridge is capable of launching heavier bullets than the 7.62×39 and has the advantage of using spitzer bullets and is chambered in strong bolt-action rifles, whereas the .30-30 is commonly loaded with round-nose or flat-nose bullets due to the fact that it is chambered in lever-action rifles with tubular magazines.

The .308×1.5" Barnes was intended as a short range deer cartridge that could also be used as a varmint and predator cartridge. Loaded with the 150 gr (9.7 g) cartridge, it is capable of taking deer-sized game out to 150 yd (140 m). For predator and varmint hunting, bullets weighing 90–125 gr (5.8–8.1 g) are commonly used.
