= Cartridges of the World =

Reference series by Frank C. Barnes

- First edition (Publ. Follett Pub. Co.)
- Editor: W. Todd Woodard (17th edition)
- Author: Frank C. Barnes
- Language: English
- Subject: Firearms cartridges
- Genre: Technical reference manual
- Publisher: Krause Publications (Gun Digest Books)
- Publication date: 1965 (1st edition) June 21, 2022 (17th edition)
- Publication place: United States
- Pages: 704, 17th edition
- ISBN: 978-1-9511-1559-3

Cartridges of the World is a comprehensive guide to firearm cartridges. The reference series is written by Frank C. Barnes. The latest version of the book is its 17th edition, published in 2022, and edited by W. Todd Woodard.

== Editions ==
- 1st edition, 1965, ASIN B000CRY476
- 2nd edition, 1969, ASIN #
- 3rd edition, 1976, ISBN 978-0-695-80326-1
- 4th edition, 1980, ISBN 978-0-910676-16-8
- 5th edition, 1985, ISBN 978-0-910676-95-3
- 6th edition, 1989, ISBN 978-0-87349-033-7
- 7th edition, 1993, ISBN 978-0-87349-145-7
- 8th edition, 1997, ISBN 978-0-87349-178-5
- 9th edition, 2000, ISBN 978-0-87341-909-3
- 10th edition, 2003, ISBN 978-0-87349-605-6
- 11th edition, 2006, ISBN 978-0-89689-297-2
- 12th edition, 2009, ISBN 978-0-89689-936-0
- 13th edition, 2012, ISBN 978-1-4402-3059-2
- 14th edition, 2014, ISBN 978-1-4402-4265-6
- 15th edition, 2016, ISBN 978-1-4402-4642-5
- 16th edition, 2019, ISBN 978-1-9462-6773-3
- 17th edition, 2022, ISBN 978-1-9511-1559-3

== Criticism ==
The series of books has often been criticised for not including dimensioned drawings of cartridges and for placing some cartridges into unusual categories. (For example, the 11th edition of the book places the .303 British round inside the section of American Military Cartridges.)
