= .450 Marlin =

US rifle cartridge

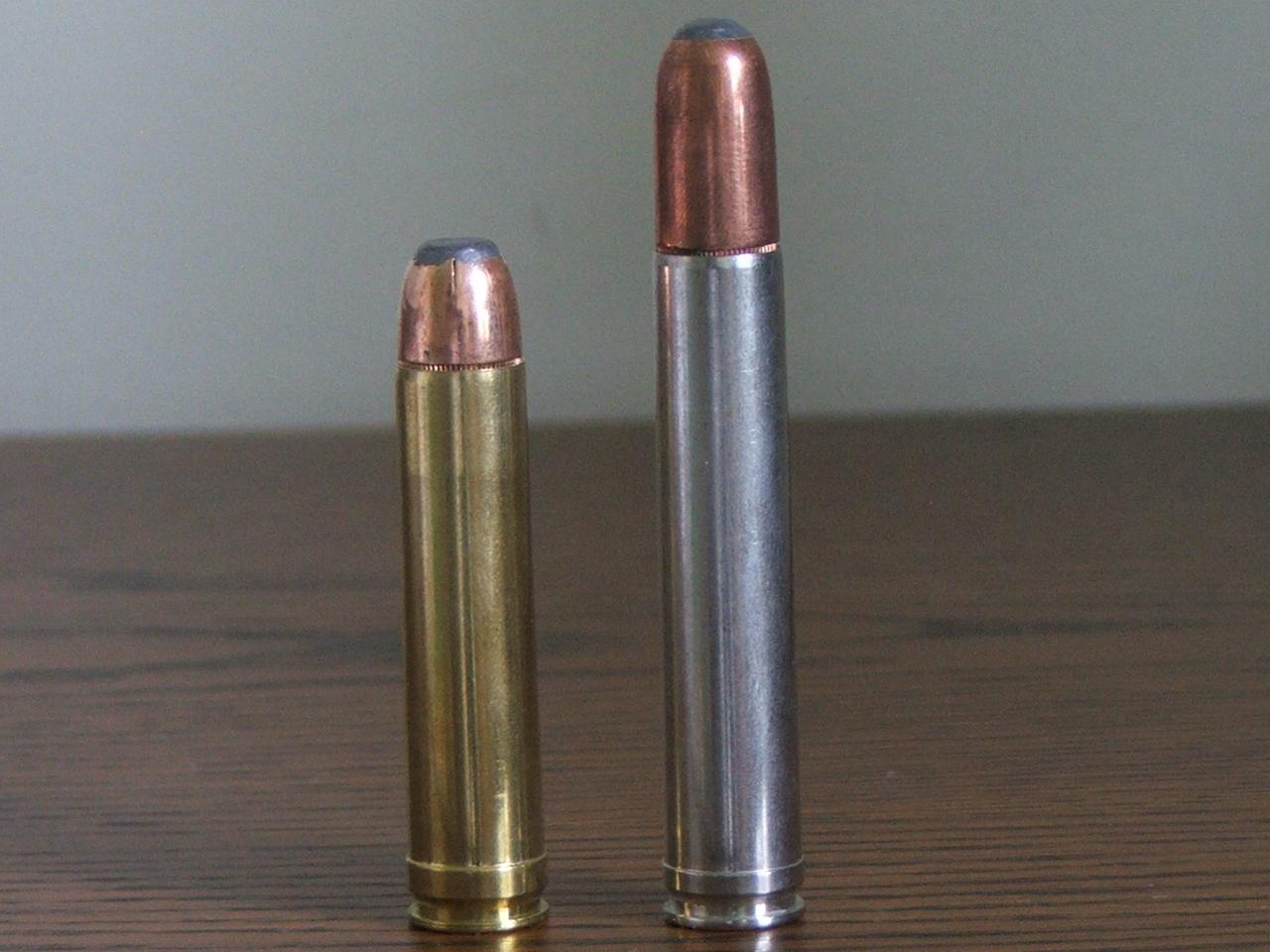
- .450 Marlin, left and .458 Winchester Magnum, right
- Type: Rifle
- Place of origin: United States

Production history
- Designer: Hornady and Marlin Firearms
- Designed: 2000
- Manufacturer: Hornady
- Produced: 2000–present

Specifications
- Parent case: .458×2-inch American
- Case type: Belted, straight
- Bullet diameter: .458 in (11.6 mm)
- Base diameter: .5121 in (13.01 mm)
- Rim diameter: .528 in (13.4 mm)
- Case length: 2.10 in (53 mm)
- Overall length: 2.55 in (65 mm)
- Rifling twist: 1:20 in (508 mm)
- Primer type: Large rifle
- Maximum pressure: 43,500 psi (300 MPa)

Ballistic performance
Bullet mass/type	Velocity	Energy
430 gr (28 g) LBT-LFN (Lead Long Flat Nose)	1,900 ft/s (580 m/s)	3,446 ft⋅lbf (4,672 J)
405 gr (26 g) JFN (Copper Jacketed Flat Nose)	1,975 ft/s (602 m/s)	3,507 ft⋅lbf (4,755 J)
350 gr (23 g) JFN	2,100 ft/s (640 m/s)	3,427 ft⋅lbf (4,646 J)
325 gr (21 g) FTX (Hornady Flex Tip Expanding LEVERevolution)	2,225 ft/s (678 m/s)	3,572 ft⋅lbf (4,843 J)
- Test barrel length: (SAAMI) 24 inches (610 mm); Sources: Buffalo Bore Ammunition, Hornady Ammunition,

The .450 Marlin(11.6x53mmB) is a firearms cartridge designed as a modernized equivalent to the .45-70 cartridge. It was designed by a joint team of Marlin and Hornady engineers headed by Hornady's Mitch Mittelstaedt, and was released in 2000, with cartridges manufactured by Hornady and rifles manufactured by Marlin, mainly the Model 1895M levergun. The Browning BLR is also now available in .450 Marlin chambering, as is the Ruger No. 1. Marlin ceased manufacture of the 1895M rifle in 2009. In October 2022 it was rumored that Ruger Firearms, the new owner of Marlin Firearms, may be reintroducing the 450 Marlin in their Model 1895 guide gun, but this has not been confirmed by Marlin or Ruger.

== Design ==
While ballistically similar to the .45-70, the .450 Marlin was not developed from the .45-70. Rather, the .450 Marlin was developed from the wildcat .458×2-inch American, which was based on the .458 Winchester Magnum. This places the .450 Marlin in the .458 Winchester family of cartridges, though it is more easily understood as a "modernized" .45-70. It is possible to handload the .45-70 to levels that can destroy older firearms such as the Trapdoor Springfield. The .450 Marlin offers the ballistics of such "hot" .45-70 loads without the risk of chambering in firearms that cannot handle its higher pressure.

The belt has been modified to prevent it from chambering in smaller-bore 7 mm Magnum or .338 Magnum rifles. The .45-70 and .450 Marlin cannot be cross-chambered, but rifles chambered for the American can be modified to fire the .450 Marlin.

Visually, the case resembles that of the .458 Winchester Magnum with a wider belt. The cartridge is most useful for hunting big game at short ranges, being accurate at ranges of 150 to 175 yards (137 to 160 m). The cartridge is capable of taking any large game animal in North America including large elk, brown bear, and moose.

One potential advantage of the .450 Marlin was its ability to chamber easily in bolt-action rifles, essentially becoming a ".45-70 bolt action" cartridge. This idea, however, was only utilized by one company: Steyr-Mannlicher. However, many companies such as E.R. Shaw Inc. and EABCO have helped numerous owners convert their existing bolt-action rifles to .450 Marlin, fulfilling the cartridge's inspired purpose.

== Dimensions ==
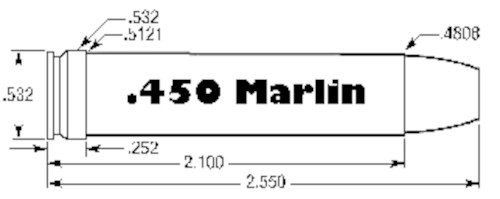

The dimensions are subject to change. The most current dimensions are available from the SAAMI website, standard Z299.4 – 2015, at pages 148 and 344.

== See also ==
- 11 mm caliber
- List of rifle cartridges
- Sporting Arms and Ammunition Manufacturers' Institute
- Table of handgun and rifle cartridges
