= Jack Lott =

American big game hunter (1920–1993)

Jacques P. Lott (July 15, 1920 – August 12, 1993), best known as Jack Lott, was a big game hunter, writer, historian, and inventor of the .458 Lott, a renowned .458 caliber belted hunting cartridge. He was a biographer of Frederick Russell Burnham and a frequent contributor on gun topics.

== Early life ==
Born in Maryland, Jack Lott was named after his uncle, Pessou Jacques Lott. In his early youth, his family moved to California and he graduated Beverly Hills High School and Los Angeles City College. He developed an early interest in military history, big game, and guns, and learned to make his own gun barrels on a lathe.

== Gunsmith and writer ==
Lott was a trained machinist and a tool-and-die man who worked for Pachmayr in the 1960s. He used this training to specialize in very high-grade firearms, particularly Mauser rifles and English double rifles. He was also an expert at stockmaking, combining English and American styles into his bolt-action rifles stocks. He was knowledgeable in all aspects of firearms lore, and he applied this knowledge in his writing. In addition to writing several biographies of Frederick Russell Burnham, in his personal collection he owned several of Burnham's guns.

Lott was a 35-year veteran of African hunts, specializing in Cape buffalo, and he hunted in Sumatra and Thailand on occasion. His expertise in hunting and gunsmithing combined to make him one of primary authorities on rifles and loads for dangerous game. While he is best known for the .458 Lott cartridge, he also helped Tom Siatos in the invention of the .460 G&A and several other heavy-caliber rifle cartridges for big game hunting.

According to his colleague Craig Boddington, a fellow writer on gun topics: "Legend has it that he worked for the CIA. We never knew that for sure, but I know he was with the anti-Castro movement and he spent a lot of time in Rhodesia during the long bush war. With Jack one never knew where fact, legend and myth intertwined – but I actually saw his Congo Cross awarded to him by Moise Tshombe for his courage in that long forgotten insurgency."

=== The .458 Lott Cartridge ===
Lott had an adverse encounter in Mozambique in 1959 with an African Cape buffalo in which he sustained injuries. He had been hunting with the then new .458 Winchester Magnum. This experience convinced him that a more powerful cartridge than the .458 Winchester Magnum was required when hunting dangerous game. After the encounter he began a search for a big bore cartridge which would suit his needs perfectly.

Not finding a cartridge that would fit his needs, he designed a cartridge which he felt would meet his requirements in a dangerous game cartridge. Jack Lott's original drawings of the cartridge were done on a napkin at a diner. The first cases for the new rifle cartridge were fireformed from .375 H&H Magnum brass into a chamber by using .458 caliber (11.6 mm) bullets which had their bases re-sized .375-inch (9.5 mm) so as to fit in the mouth of the .375 H&H Magnum. This method of fireforming left the newly formed cases slightly shorter than the parent cases. The resulting cartridge is named the .458 Lott in his honor. A similar method was used by David Miller and Curt Crum to create cases for their early custom .458 Lott rifles. The creation of the cases began with the casting of a .458 in (11.6 mm) bullet with a .375 in (9.5 mm) shank and which weighed around 260 gr. This bullet was seated on a .375 H&H Magnum case containing 30.0 gr (1.94 g) of Hercules 2400 powder with some polyester material used as a wadding to hold the powder charge against the primer. This set-up was then fire-formed in rifle with a .458 Lott chamber. The fire-formed cases were then run through a .458 Winchester Magnum full length re-sizing die with a set off of .125 in (3.2 mm). Once this was accomplished cases were trimmed to 2.790 in (70.9 mm) tumbled clean. This method of fire-forming of brass led to severe gas cutting into the neck area of the .458 Lott fire-forming rifle after only 200 rounds. In 1989 A-Square became the first company to offer the .458 Lott as a commercial cartridge.

== Illness and suicide ==
In 1992, Lott suffered failure in both kidneys due in part to his alcoholism and diabetes. He began to lose his sight and needed dialysis twice a week. He used a .455 Webley revolver to take his own life with a shot to his head.

== Notes ==
Source notes
