= Frank C. Barnes =

American lawyer

- Born: June 25, 1918; Chicago, Illinois
- Died: December 17, 1992 (aged 74); Templeton
- Other names: Frank Charles Barnes
- Occupations: lawyer, author, cartridge designer

Frank C. Barnes (June 25, 1918 in Chicago, Cook, Illinois — December 17, 1992 in Templeton, California) was an American lawyer and internationally known author and cartridge designer.

== History ==
Barnes was born in Chicago. He did his military service from 1945 to 1947. At Truckee Meadows Community College he was a department head ("Criminal Justice Department Chairman"). He had a master's degree in Justice. He was the author of Cartridges of the World and the designer of the .308×1.5" Barnes, the .458×1.5in, and the .458×2" American.
