= .458×2-inch American =

Rifle cartridge

.458×2 inch American
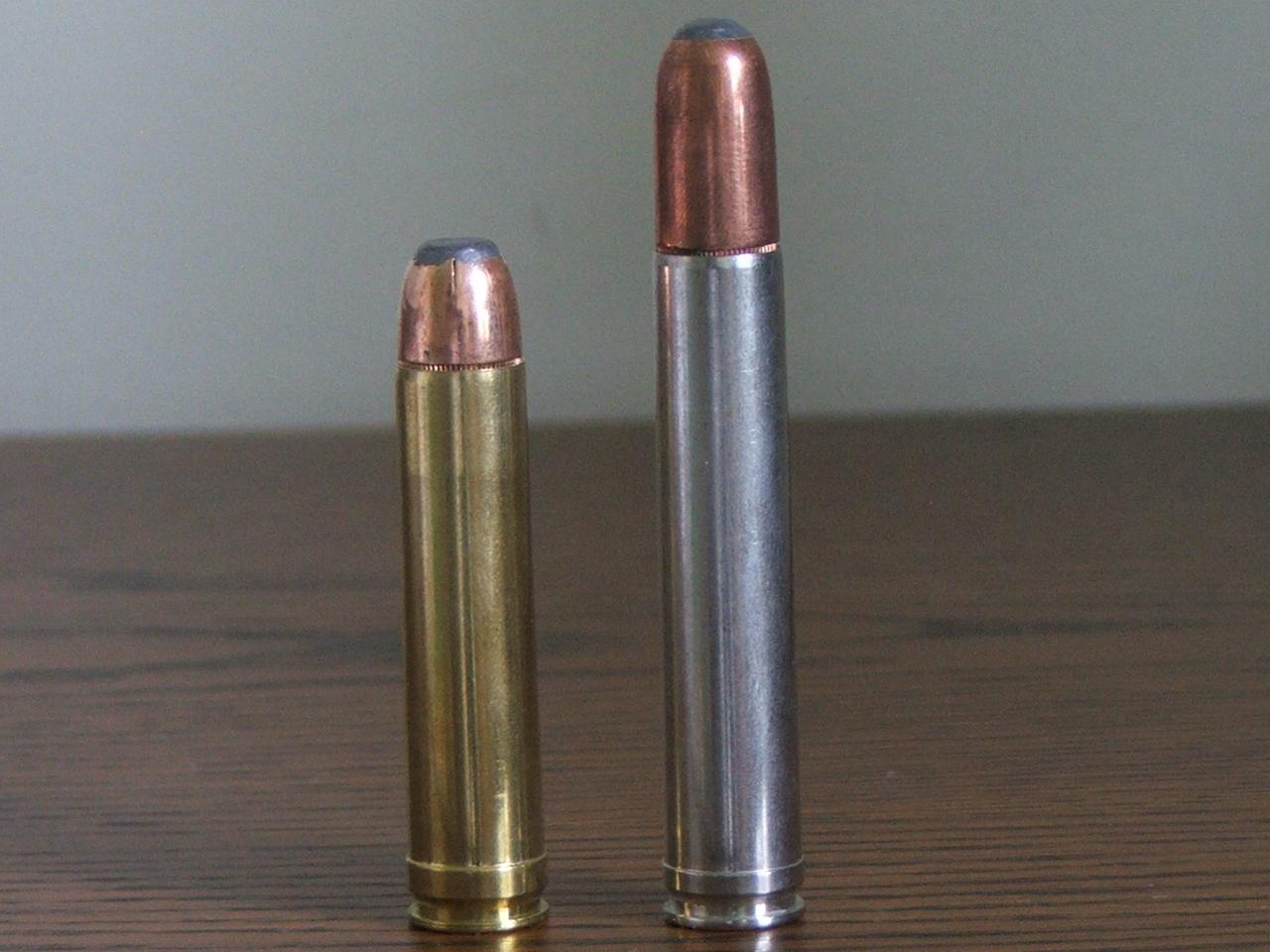
- The .458×2-inch is nearly identical to the .450 Marlin (left) except that its belt is the same length as that of the .458 Winchester Magnum (right).
- Type: Rifle
- Place of origin: USA

Production history
- Designer: Frank Barnes
- Designed: 1962
- Variants: .450 Marlin

Specifications
- Parent case: .458 Winchester Magnum
- Case type: Belted, straight
- Bullet diameter: .458 in (11.6 mm)
- Neck diameter: .481 in (12.2 mm)
- Base diameter: .513 in (13.0 mm)
- Rim diameter: .532 in (13.5 mm)
- Rim thickness: .050 in (1.3 mm)
- Case length: 2.000 in (50.8 mm)
- Case capacity: 73 gr H_{2}O (4.7 cm^{3})

The .458×2-inch American is a belted, straight, .458 caliber (11.6 mm) big-bore cartridge designed by Frank Barnes. It is based on the .458 Winchester Magnum shortened to 2 in (51 mm).

== General Information ==
The .458×2-inch American was designed as a medium-power big-bore cartridge by Frank Barnes for North American big game. Frank Barnes found that the .458 Winchester Magnum and the .460 Weatherby Magnum too powerful for North American big game and believed that a cartridge of lesser power would be ample for the task.

The cartridge has the power required to take all North American big game species. It is also adequate for African dangerous game in close cover.

The .450 Marlin and the .458×2-inch American are very similar cartridges. The cartridges are essentially the same length. However, the .450 Marlin will not chamber in the .458×2-inch American as the belt on the .450 Marlin is considerably wider. The .458×2-inch American should not be fired in a .450 Marlin as failures may occur. While not interchangeable, the .458×2-inch American will do anything the .450 Marlin is capable of accomplishing, and converting such a rifle to .450 Marlin is fairly straightforward. Both cartridges are essentially the .45-70 with a belt instead of a rim.

The .458×2-inch American was intended for bolt-action rifles. The first rifle chambered for the cartridge was a customized Remington Model 722. The cartridge also can be chambered for the Winchester Model 94 lever action rifle.

Ammunition can be made from .375 H&H Magnum cases and cases derived from it, including the .458 Winchester Magnum. Dies are available from RCBS and chamber reamers from H&M Tool Company.

.458×2-inch American has remained a wildcat caliber, as no factory rifles or ammunition were offered in this caliber.

== Dimensions ==
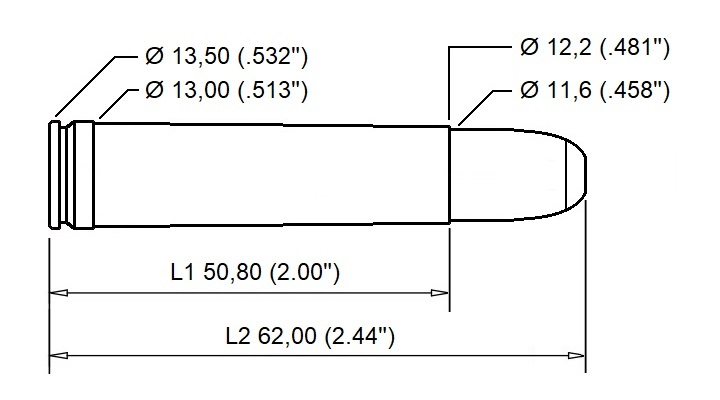
