= .416 Ruger =

Rifle cartridge

- Type: Rifle
- Place of origin: United States

Production history
- Designer: Ruger
- Designed: 2008

Specifications
- Parent case: .375 Ruger
- Case type: Rimless, bottleneck
- Bullet diameter: .416 in (10.6 mm)
- Base diameter: .532 in (13.5 mm)
- Rim diameter: .532 in (13.5 mm)
- Rim thickness: .050 in (1.3 mm)
- Case length: 2.572 in (65.3 mm)
- Overall length: 3.340 in (84.8 mm)
- Case capacity: 100 gr H_{2}O (6.5 cm^{3})
- Primer type: Large rifle
- Maximum pressure (SAAMI): 62,000 psi (430 MPa)
- Maximum pressure (CIP): 62,366 psi (430.00 MPa)

Ballistic performance
Bullet mass/type	Velocity	Energy
400 gr (26 g) Trophy Bonded Bear Claw	2,470 ft/s (750 m/s)	5,418 ft⋅lbf (7,346 J)
350 gr (23 g) Speer Hot-Cor	2,731 ft/s (832 m/s)	5,796 ft⋅lbf (7,858 J)
- Test barrel length: 24 inches Source

The .416 Ruger is a .41 caliber (10.6 x 65.5mm), rimless, bottleneck cartridge designed as a joint venture by Hornady and Ruger in 2008. It is designed to equal the performance of the .416 Rigby and .416 Remington Magnum from a standard length .30-06 length action. The .416 Ruger is suitable for the largest land animals, including dangerous game.

== Description ==
The .416 Ruger is based on the earlier .375 Ruger. This family of cartridges has the same base diameter as the belt of the .375 H&H Magnum and its derivatives, which provides the cartridge a larger propellant capacity than a standard width magnum cartridge of the same length, such as the .338 Winchester Magnum. The resultant cartridge duplicates the performance of the .416 Rigby and the .416 Remington Magnum. Unlike these cartridges, however, the .416 Ruger can be chambered in a standard-length action, as the cartridge has an overall length of 3.34 inches.

The .416 Ruger cartridge is currently available in the bolt-action Ruger M77 Hawkeye rifles with two variations listed on Ruger's website as of 2024: the "African" and the "Guide Gun" rifles. It is also available in straight pull rifles from Strasser. Ruger formerly offered their No. 1 single shot rifle in the cartridge but has since discontinued the combination. Krieghoff offers a bolt action rifle chambered for the round. Aftermarket barrel conversions for the Thompson Center Encore are also available in the chambering.

Ammunition is available from Hornady and Buffalo Bore.

Norma 9x19 (124gr), Geco Plus 9,3x74R (255gr), Hornady .416 Ruger DGS (400gr)

== See also ==
- List of rifle cartridges
- https://www.hornady.com/ammunition/rifle/416-ruger-400-gr-dgs#!/
- https://www.hornady.com/ammunition/rifle/416-ruger-400-gr-dgx-bonded#!/
- Table of handgun and rifle cartridges
