= .458 Lott =

Rifle cartridge

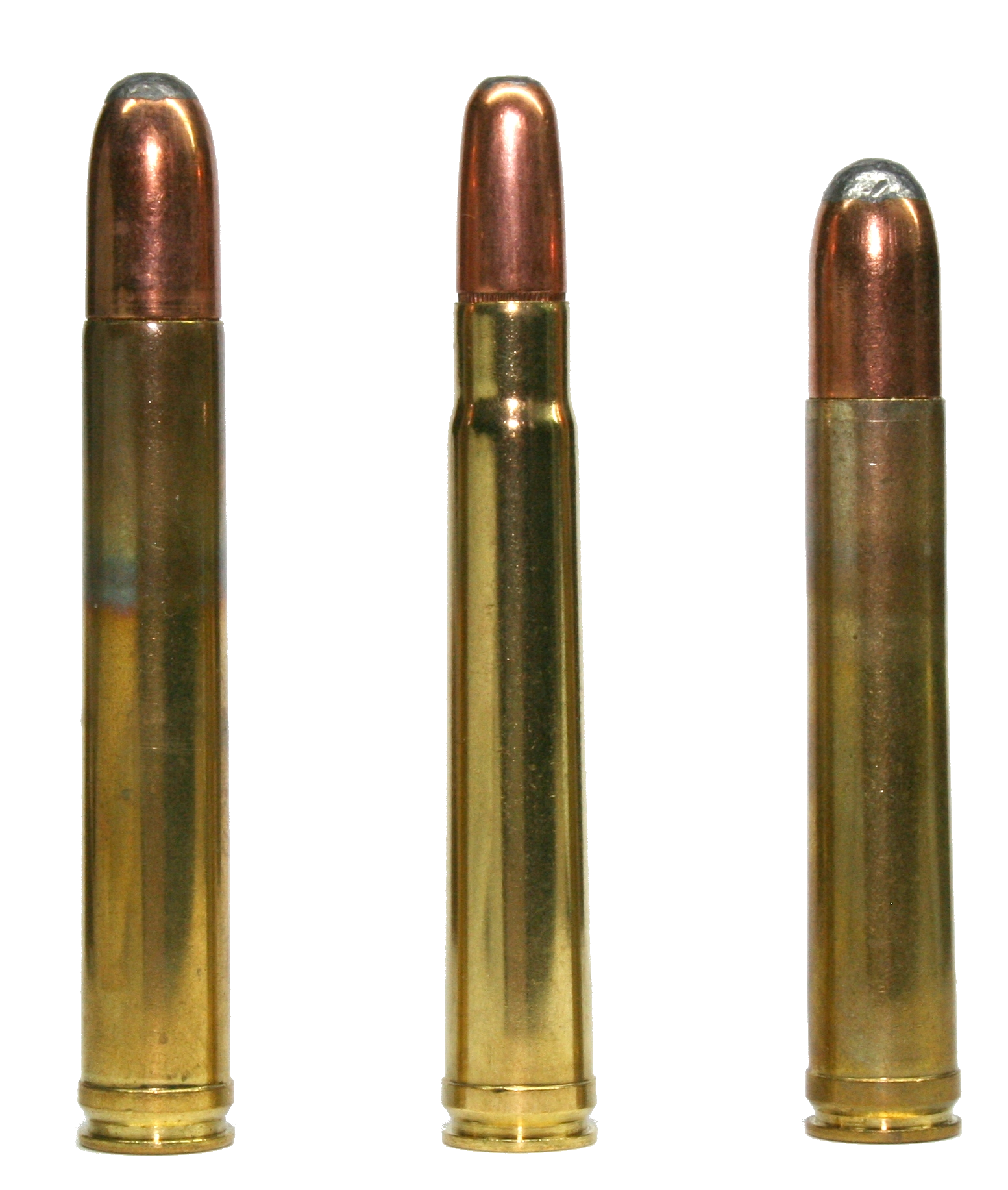
- .458 Lott (left), its parent case the .375 H&H Magnum (center) and the .458 Winchester Magnum (right) for comparison.
- Type: Rifle
- Place of origin: United States

Production history
- Designer: Jack Lott
- Designed: 1971
- Manufacturer: A-Square
- Produced: 1989–present
- Variants: .458 Lott Improved, .450 Watts Magnum, .450 Ackley Magnum

Specifications
- Parent case: .375 H&H Magnum
- Case type: Belted, straight
- Bullet diameter: .458 in (11.6 mm)
- Neck diameter: .481 in (12.2 mm)
- Base diameter: .513 in (13.0 mm)
- Rim diameter: .532 in (13.5 mm)
- Rim thickness: .050 in (1.3 mm)
- Case length: 2.800 in (71.1 mm)
- Overall length: 3.600 in (91.4 mm)
- Case capacity: 110 gr H_{2}O (7.1 cm^{3})
- Rifling twist: 1-14 in
- Primer type: Large Rifle (Magnum)
- Maximum pressure: 62,500 psi (431 MPa)

Ballistic performance
Bullet mass/type	Velocity	Energy
300 gr (19 g) Barnes X	2,700 ft/s (820 m/s)	4,855 ft⋅lbf (6,582 J)
350 gr (23 g) Barnes X	2,600 ft/s (790 m/s)	5,252 ft⋅lbf (7,121 J)
400 gr (26 g) Barnes X	2,550 ft/s (780 m/s)	5,774 ft⋅lbf (7,828 J)
450 gr (29 g) Barnes Solid	2,450 ft/s (750 m/s)	5,996 ft⋅lbf (8,129 J)
500 gr (32 g) Barnes Solid	2,300 ft/s (700 m/s)	5,872 ft⋅lbf (7,961 J)

The .458 Lott is a .458 caliber rifle cartridge designed for the purpose of hunting large, thick-skinned dangerous game animals in Africa. It is based on the full length .375 H&H Magnum case necked up and shortened to 2.800 inches (71.1 millimetres).

The .458 Lott was designed in response to perceived inadequacies and problems encountered with the .458 Winchester Magnum. The cartridge provides a distinct step up in performance over the .458 Winchester Magnum. A-Square, Česká Zbrojovka/Brno, Hornady, and Ruger have been instrumental in the cartridge's rise in popularity.

== Cartridge history ==
The .458 Winchester Magnum was designed in 1956 and was an immediate commercial success. It was a more economical alternative to the English double rifles that were considered the standard rifle type for dangerous game hunting in Africa. The .458 Winchester Magnum was designed to emulate the performance of the .450 Nitro Express in a standard-length bolt-action rifle. However, it soon became apparent that the .458 Winchester Magnum was not performing as anticipated. Several factors contributing to its less than stellar performance in Africa: clumping of its compressed powder charge and use in 20–22 in (510–560 mm) barrel rifles.

Jack Lott, a big-game hunter and writer from the US, had an adverse encounter with a Cape buffalo in Mozambique in 1959 in which he sustained injuries. He had been hunting with the then new .458 Winchester Magnum. This experience convinced him that a cartridge more powerful than the .458 Winchester Magnum was required when hunting dangerous game in Africa. After the encounter he began a search for a big-bore cartridge which would suit his needs perfectly.

Not finding a cartridge that would fit his needs, he designed a cartridge which he felt would meet his requirements in a dangerous-game cartridge. Jack Lott's original drawings of the cartridge were done on a napkin at a diner. The first cases for the new rifle cartridge were fireformed from .375 H&H Magnum brass into a chamber by using .458 caliber (11.6 mm) bullets which had their bases re-sized .375-inch (9.5 mm) so as to fit in the mouth of the .375 H&H Magnum. This method of fireforming left the newly formed cases slightly shorter than the parent cases. The resulting cartridge is named the .458 Lott in his honor. A similar method was used by David Miller and Curt Crum to create cases for their early custom .458 Lott rifles. The creation of the cases began with the casting of a .458 in (11.6 mm) bullet with a .375 in (9.5 mm) shank and which weighed around 260 gr. This bullet was seated on a .375 H&H Magnum case containing 30.0 gr (1.94 g) of Hercules 2400 powder with some polyester material used as a wadding to hold the powder charge against the primer. This set-up was then fire-formed in rifle with a .458 Lott chamber. The fire-formed cases were then run through a .458 Winchester Magnum full length re-sizing die with a set off of .125 in (3.2 mm). Once this was accomplished cases were trimmed to 2.790 in (70.9 mm) tumbled clean. Unfortunately for Miller and Crum, this method of fire-forming of brass led to severe gas cutting into the neck area of the .458 Lott fire-forming rifle after only 200 rounds.

In 1989 A-Square became the first company to offer the .458 Lott as a commercial cartridge. At present, the 465-grain (30.1 g) Triad (Monolithic Solid, Dead Tough and the Lion Load) for the .458 Lott cartridge is available from the company. A-Square also championed the successful SAAMI standardization of the .458 Lott cartridge which took place in 1995. They currently offer the A-Square Hannibal and Caesar rifles chambered for this cartridge.

== Design and specifications ==
The objective behind the design of the .458 Lott was to provide a greater case capacity over the .458 Winchester Magnum so as to provide better performance and less compression of the powder charge. The .458 Lott achieved both these objectives by its lengthened cartridge. Furthermore, as the Lott cartridge is in essence a lengthened .458 Winchester Magnum, converting a .458 Winchester Magnum to .458 Lott involves in many cases a simple re-boring of the chamber and if required, a lengthening of the magazine.

The .458 Lott was standardized by SAAMI in 1995 based on specification provided by Arthur Alphin and A-Square LLC. According to Arthur Alphin, the cartridge length was standardized at 2.800-inch (71.1 mm) and the chamber length at 2.810-inch (71.4 mm) because there were many converted rifles in the field that were chambered for the original Jack Lott length. The specifications published by SAAMI reflect this fact.

The specifications for the .458 Lott call for a cartridge which gradually tapers. However, A-Square and few other ammunition manufacturers provide a ghost shoulder for the cartridge which was not included in the specification as standardized by SAAMI. Arthur Alphin chose not to include the ghost shoulder to remain true to Jack Lott's wishes and to honor his memory. The ghost shoulder serves to provide better retention of the bullet in the case under recoil. Like A-Square .458 Lott cartridges, Barnes .458 Lott brass bears a ghost shoulder for this very same reason.

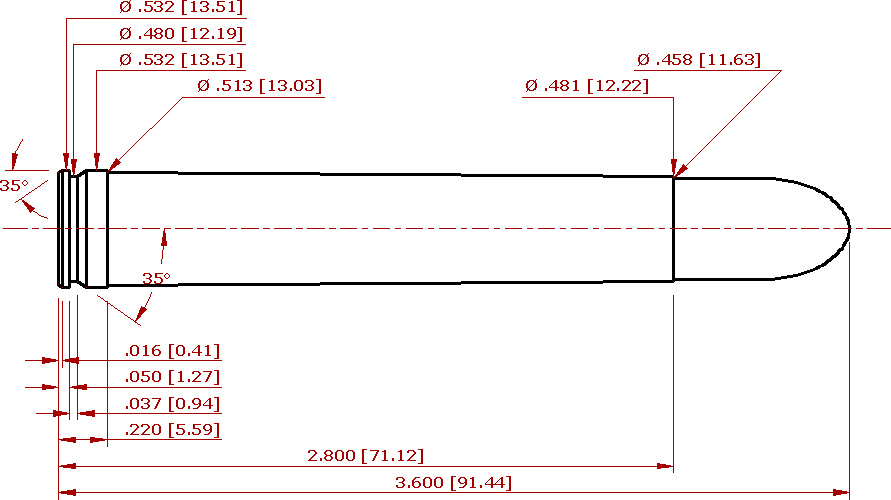
SAAMI compliant .458 Lott cartridge schematic: All dimensions in inches [millimeters].

SAAMI recommends a 6 groove rifling contour with each groove being .150-inch (3.8 mm) wide. Distance between lands is .450-inch (11.4 mm) and between grooves is .458-inch (11.6 mm). Recommended rifling twist rate for this cartridge is 1-14 in.

Since Lott was an influential big-game hunter and writer, the cartridge gained some attention with professional hunters in Africa. The .458 Lott was soon commercialized by A-Square as a proprietary cartridge. CZ chambered the cartridge in their BRNO ZKK 602 rifles based on the Magnum Mauser action. However, the Lott remained fairly obscure at least in the United States until Ruger offered the cartridge in their Ruger M77RSM Mk II rifles to the American public in 2002. Since then there has been a slow but steady movement away from the .458 Winchester Magnum towards the .458 Lott among professional hunters heading to Africa.

The .458 Winchester Magnum is ubiquitous in Africa. While one might not be able to easily find ammunition for the big Weatherby or the Nitro Express cartridges, due to its popularity one would be able to find .458 Winchester Magnum cartridges. In an emergency, the .458 Winchester Magnum can be fired in the chamber of a .458 Lott.

== Performance ==
By 1970 Winchester was forced to deal with the clumping of the compressed powder charge which had been resulting in improper ignition and poor performance. Winchester's remedy was to lessen the compression of the powder column. The result was a .458 Winchester Magnum that was now attaining only about 1,950-foot-per-second (590 m/s). This was 200 ft/s (61 m/s) below what Winchester's original design specifications intended. The .458 Winchester Magnum was originally supposed to duplicate the performance of the .450 Nitro Express which could fire a 500 gr (32 g) bullet at 2,150-foot-per-second (660 m/s).

On the other hand, the .458 Lott is designed to provide about 200–300-foot-per-second (61–91 m/s) more velocity than the .458 Winchester Magnum. The performance goal does not just match but exceeds the original performance specifications of the .458 Winchester Magnum. The cartridge is capable of firing a 500-grain (32 g) bullet at 2,300-foot-per-second (700 m/s) from a 23-inch (580 mm) barrel such as the Ruger M77. This capability easily exceeded the performance that was expected of the .450 Nitro Express and the .458 Winchester Magnum. The Lott cartridge was a distinct step up from the .458 Winchester Magnum and the .450 Nitro Express cartridges. The .458 Lott is also considered a better cartridge for dangerous game hunting than the .470 Nitro Express when judged by its effects on big game.

Due to its development and purpose, the performance of the .458 Lott is often compared with that of the .458 Winchester Magnum. This is inevitable as the latter was the cartridge which the .458 Lott was designed to replace.

Cartridge	Criteria	Muzzle	50-yard (46 m)	100-yard (91 m)	150-yard (140 m)	200-yard (180 m)	250-yard (230 m)	300-yard (270 m)
.458 Winchester Magnum Hornady 500-grain (32 g) DGS	Velocity	2,140 ft/s (650 m/s)	2,007 ft/s (612 m/s)	1,879 ft/s (573 m/s)	1,757 ft/s (536 m/s)	1,641 ft/s (500 m/s)	1,531 ft/s (467 m/s)	1,429 ft/s (436 m/s)
.458 Winchester Magnum Hornady 500-grain (32 g) DGS	Energy	5,084 ft⋅lbf (6,893 J)	4,472 ft⋅lbf (6,063 J)	3,921 ft⋅lbf (5,316 J)	3,428 ft⋅lbf (4,648 J)	2,990 ft⋅lbf (4,050 J)	2,603 ft⋅lbf (3,529 J)	2,267 ft⋅lbf (3,074 J)
.458 Lott Hornady 500-grain (32 g) DGS	Velocity	2,300 ft/s (700 m/s)	2,162 ft/s (659 m/s)	2,029 ft/s (618 m/s)	1,900 ft/s (580 m/s)	1,777 ft/s (542 m/s)	1,660 ft/s (510 m/s)	1,549 ft/s (472 m/s)
.458 Lott Hornady 500-grain (32 g) DGS	Energy	5,873 ft⋅lbf (7,963 J)	5,190 ft⋅lbf (7,040 J)	4,568 ft⋅lbf (6,193 J)	4,007 ft⋅lbf (5,433 J)	3,505 ft⋅lbf (4,752 J)	3,058 ft⋅lbf (4,146 J)	2,663 ft⋅lbf (3,611 J)
Values courtesy of the Hornady Ballistic Calculator For the purposes of this comparison barrel a barrel length of 24 in (610 mm) is used.

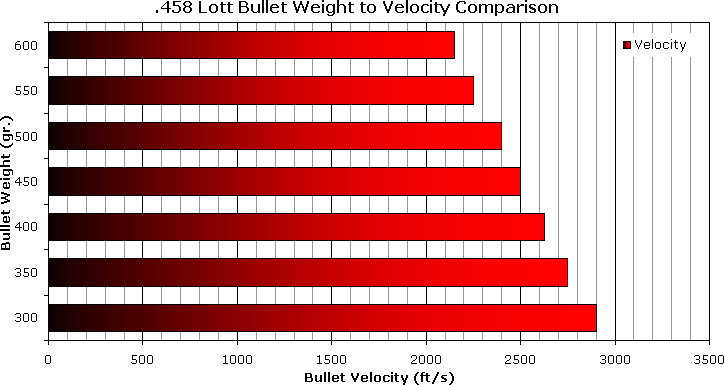

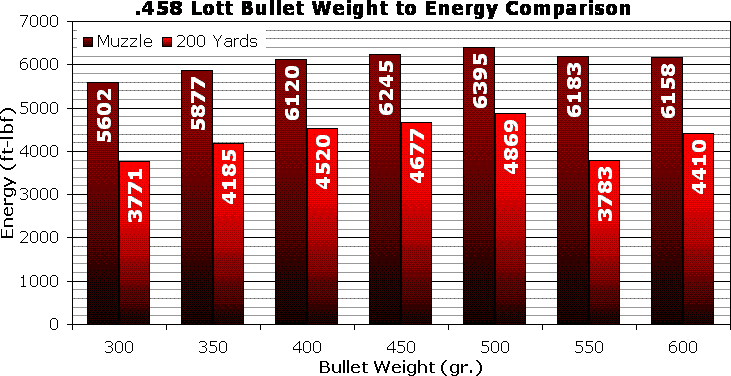

The .458 Lott is able to attain over 2,300-foot-per-second (700 m/s) with a 500-grain (32 g) jacketed bullet at safe pressure levels from a 23–24-inch (580–610 mm) barrel. In comparison, many ammunition manufacturers load the .458 Winchester Magnum to velocities between 2,050–1,950 ft/s (620–590 m/s). Hornady's Superformance ammunition being an exception which uses powder blends which at present remain proprietary. The .458 Lott is capable of reaching a velocity of 2,150-foot-per-second (660 m/s) with the 600-grain (39 g) bullet which is greater than the velocity reached by Hornady's 500-grain (32 g) Superformance .458 Winchester Magnum ammunition. With lighter bullets of 300-grain (19 g), it is able to achieve a velocity of about 2,850 ft/s (870 m/s). These energy and velocity values provide the .458 Lott cartridge a gain of between 50–100 yd (46–91 m) over the .458 Winchester Magnum in distance. This performance increase provides better penetration and stopping power than the .458 Winchester Magnum against dangerous game.

However, the mono-metal bullets fall short of this velocity threshold due to the need to seat the bullets deeper owing to the length of the bullets and the need to stay within the maximum overall length specification of the cartridge. This is because the lower mono-metal bullets have a higher length to weight ratio than conventional bullets. Manufacturers such as A-Square have chosen to load slightly lighter bullets 465-grain (30.1 g) instead of the 500-grain (32 g) bullets.

The straight tapered case of the .458 Lott provides greater flexibility in reloading to lower velocities than bottlenecked cartridges. The ability to reload ammunition to lower velocities with lighter bullets can provide shooters with ammunition with less recoil than the full power .458 Lott ammunition. Nyati Inc., a big bore ammunition manufacturer, has taken advantage of this flexibility and offers ammunition featuring a 500-grain (32 g) copper jacket bullet at 1,100-foot-per-second (340 m/s). They also offer intermediate power ammunition for the .458 Lott as well.

Handloaders can take advantage of the wide range of bullet of useful weights are available in .45 caliber for the .458 Lott cartridge. Bullets ranging from 300–600 gr (19–39 g) can be loaded for the Lott cartridge. This, together with the ability to load the cartridge to lower power levels, easily adds to the versatility of the .458 Lott. .458 Lott velocities range from 3,000 ft/s (910 m/s) with the 300 gr (19 g) bullet and 2,150 ft/s (660 m/s) with the 600 gr (39 g) bullet. Spitzer bullets with better ballistics such as the Barnes X or TSX bullet provides better down range performance over the more conventional .45 caliber (11.6 mm) bullets. The .458 Lott does well with hardcast lead bullets. With these bullets the Lott can be loaded to the power level of the original .45-70 Government cartridge. which was a 405 gr (26.2 g) bullet at 1,330 ft/s (410 m/s).

What the .458 Lott lacks in velocity and energy compared to the .450 Rigby or the .460 Weatherby Magnum, it more than makes up for by virtue of its versatility. Larger volume cases such as the .460 Weatherby Magnum do not do well with powder charges below the recommended minimums. This is due to the erratic ignition and hangfire issues experienced when large capacity cartridges are loaded with small powder charges. The Lott has no such issues and takes well to lower powder charges.

== Sporting usage ==
The .458 Lott was designed to be an African dangerous game rifle cartridge particularly for use against heavy, thick-skinned dangerous game such as elephant, Cape buffalo and rhinoceros. It is considered an ideal cartridge for hunting African dangerous game and is capable of taking game from elephant to the duiker. Acceptable bullet weights for the .458 Lott range from 300-to-600-grain (19 to 39 g). The range of available bullets provides the flexibility to customize loads for specific game species.

Elephant require a bullet of a tough construction which will not deform easily. The bullet must be able to penetrate heavy bone and exit from all possible angles. These requirement reduce the useful choices to solid bullets. This is especially true if the classic brain shot is contemplated when hunting elephant where the bullet must penetrate through the honeycombed bone structure of the frontal area of the elephant's skull. Bullets which are chosen must have sectional densities of over .300 while a sectional densities of .330 are preferred so as to provide the necessary penetration on these, the largest of the terrestrial mammals. Premium solid bullets from A-square, Barnes, Hornady, North Fork or Woodleigh weighing in the range of 450–550 gr (29–36 g) are all capable of holding together without much deformation and penetrating to the brain. With lesser FMJ bullets only heart, lung or shoulder shots should be considered.

Cape buffalo and rhinoceros, though heavily boned and tough are mostly hunted with soft point bullets although FMJ and solid bullets are chosen by some hunters. Again as with elephants, premium bullets of a sturdy construction should be chosen. The bullet chosen must be able to break through bone and penetrate to the vitals. Soft points similar to the A-Square Dead Tough, Barnes TSX, Hornady DGX and the Woodleigh Weldcore Soft Nose are examples of these bullets. The .458 Lott has ample power to spare on these species.

While the .458 Lott is capable of taking lion and leopard, it is considered overly powerful for the big cats. Lighter, soft point bullets which rapidly expand or fragment at higher velocities are usually recommended for the big cats. A-Square Lion Load bullet or soft points manufactured for the .45-70 Government fills this niche for the .458 Lott.

The manufacture of spitzer style bullets in the .45 caliber has generally been a recent trend. These bullets provide better ballistic coefficients than the more common round nose or flat nosed bullets available in this caliber. The better ballistic coefficients translate to better longer range performance. Loaded with lighter bullets with better ballistic coefficients at higher velocities the .458 Lott can be used as a medium-range plains game rifle cartridge.

In North America, apart from big bears and bison, big game does not require cartridges similar to the .458 Lott. Those who reload ammunition are able to take advantage of the .458 Lott's performance flexibility to tailor their ammunition to the species of game they wish to hunt.

== Rifles and ammunition ==
Since there are several rifle actions manufactured that are capable of handling the full length magnum cartridges such as the .375 H&H Magnum, it is not surprising that the .458 Lott has been chambered in several rifles. The .458 Lott cartridge's maximum overall length is only .3 in (7.6 mm) longer than the standard length magnum cartridges like the 7mm Remington Magnum and the .300 Winchester Magnum. For this reason several rifles, which were formerly chambered for cartridges like the .375 H&H Magnum and the .458 Winchester Magnum, were easily converted to the .458 Lott early on when .458 Lott rifles were only available as a custom offering. These conversions required no more than a re-boring or a re-barreling and perhaps a magazine extension if required.

The Mauser style action has long been favored by African hunters. It is considered a highly reliable action for its ability to function dependably under adverse and stressful conditions. Many rifle makers like CZ, Hartmann & Weiss, Heym, Holland & Holland, Mauser, Kimber, and Westley Richards are turning out rifles made on the Magnum Mauser 98 action in this cartridge. CZ's Brno ZKK602 was one of the first rifles manufactured which was chambered for the .458 Lott. CZ currently produces the CZ 550 American Magnum rifle in that chambering. The Heym Express and Kimber Caprivi are also manufactured for the .458 Lott cartridge. Mauser makes .458 Lott rifles in several models in their M 98 and M 03 rifle lines.

Non-Mauser action rifles for the .458 Lott are produced by A-Square, Blaser and Weatherby. A-Square's Hannibal and Caesar rifles are built on Enfield P14 actions. Blaser manufactures the Blaser R8 Safari PH and Safari Luxus rifle models in the .458 Lott chambering. Weatherby offers the .458 Lott cartridge in the Mark V Deluxe and also through their custom shop. Ruger chambers the .458 Lott in the Ruger No. 1 Tropical Rifle. Several other manufacturers also offer rifles chambered in the cartridge as a regular or custom offering.

An advantage that the .458 Lott offers over more voluminous cartridges such as the .450 Rigby, .460 Weatherby or the .505 Gibbs is that it can be easily adopted in currently mass-produced and thus commonly encountered rifle actions with little or no modification of the bolt face. For this reason, it is a much more economical alternative to cartridges which need larger action types and larger bolt faces. The cartridge's popularity is due in large part to the wide availability of affordable rifles which are or can easily be chambered for the cartridge.

Due to the popularity of the .458 Lott as a hunting cartridge there are several sources of ammunition. A-Square, Double Tap, Federal, Hornady, Kynoch, and Norma are among several manufacturers of .458 Lott ammunition. Most ammunition manufactured for the cartridge is loaded with a 500 gr (32 g) bullet at 2,300 ft/s (700 m/s) which has become the industry standard for the cartridge.

.458 Lott Ammunition
Ammunition	Bullet	Muzzle Velocity	Muzzle Energy	MPBR/Zero
Double Tap	350 gr (23 g) TSX	2,875 ft/s (876 m/s)	6,426 ft⋅lbf (8,712 J)	266 yd (243 m)/227 yd (208 m)
Double Tap	500 gr (32 g) Weldcore JSP	2,350 ft/s (720 m/s)	6,133 ft⋅lbf (8,315 J)	226 yd (207 m)/193 yd (176 m)
Double Tap	550 gr (36 g) Weldcore JSP	2,195 ft/s (669 m/s)	5,913 ft⋅lbf (8,017 J)	215 yd (197 m)/283 yd (259 m)
Federal P458LT1	500 gr (32 g) TBCC	2,300 ft/s (700 m/s)	5,873 ft⋅lbf (7,963 J)	224 yd (205 m)/191 yd (175 m)
Federal P458LT2	500 gr (32 g) TBSS	2,300 ft/s (700 m/s)	5,873 ft⋅lbf (7,963 J)	223 yd (204 m)/190 yd (170 m)
Federal P458LA	500 gr (32 g) TSX	2,280 ft/s (690 m/s)	5,771 ft⋅lbf (7,824 J)	227 yd (208 m)/193 yd (176 m)
Federal P458LG	500 gr (32 g) BBS	2,300 ft/s (700 m/s)	5,873 ft⋅lbf (7,963 J)	228 yd (208 m)/194 yd (177 m)
Hornady 8262	500 gr (32 g) DGS	2,300 ft/s (700 m/s)	5,873 ft⋅lbf (7,963 J)	220 yd (200 m)/188 yd (172 m)
Hornady 82613	500 gr (32 g) DGX	2,300 ft/s (700 m/s)	5,873 ft⋅lbf (7,963 J)	220 yd (200 m)/188 yd (172 m)
Norma 11115	500 gr (32 g) RN	2,100 ft/s (640 m/s)	4,897 ft⋅lbf (6,639 J)	206 yd (188 m)/176 yd (161 m)
Norma 11116	500 gr (32 g) FMJ	2,100 ft/s (640 m/s)	4,897 ft⋅lbf (6,639 J)	206 yd (188 m)/176 yd (161 m)
Values courtesy of the respective manufacturer MPBR/Zero values courtesy of Big Game Info.

== Variants ==
Prior to the arrival of the .458 Lott there were a few other .45 caliber (11.6 mm) cartridges with similar performance levels based on the full length .375 H&H Magnum case such as the .450 Ackley Magnum, .450 Barnes Supreme, .450 Mashburn Magnum and the .450 Watts Magnum. There are only minute variations between these cartridges. Most .458 Lott chambers will accept the .450 Watts cartridge as the chambers are reamed to accept a 2.850-inch (72.4 mm) cartridge. The .458 Lott chamber will not accept an improved cartridges like the .450 Ackley Magnum and the .450 Barnes Supreme. Depending on chamber dimensions it may accept the Watts version of the cartridge. However strict SAAMI compliant chambers will not accept the .450 Watts Magnum and any attempt to discharge it in such a chamber will invariably result in higher pressures and catastrophic failures may result.

=== .450 Ackley Magnum ===
The .450 Ackley Magnum was designed in 1960 by Parker Otto Ackley. The .450 Ackley Magnum can be considered an improved cartridge in comparison with the .458 Lott. The cartridge has minimum body taper ending with a small shoulder. Case capacity and performance is slightly greater than that of the .458 Lott resulting in less 50-foot-per-second (15 m/s) in velocity at equal pressures. Chamber will accept the Lott and Watts cartridges. The .458 Winchester Magnum can be fired in the chamber in an emergency. The .450 Barnes supreme cannot be fired in the chamber of the .450 Ackley as there are minute dimensional differences which may prevent the cartridge from chambering. A-Square currently loads this cartridge with a 465-grain (30.1 g) bullet at 2,400-foot-per-second (730 m/s).

=== .450 Watts Magnum ===
The .450 Watts Magnum was designed by Watts and Anderson of Washington State. The .450 Watts Magnum is similar to the .458 Lott with the exception of case length which is 2.850-inch (72.4 mm). While the case capacity is slightly more than that of the Lott cartridge, the maximum overall cartridge length is the same. As this is the case, once the bullet is seated case powder capacity is almost identical. A .450 Watts Magnum chamber will accept the .458 Lott cartridge without issue. The .458 Winchester Magnum can be fired in the chamber if required. The .450 Watts can be fired in the chambers of the .450 Ackley Magnum, .450 Barnes Supreme and the .450 Mashburn Magnum chambers. Firing the case in improved chambers similar to that of the Ackley or the Barnes cartridges will result in a slight reduction in performance.

== See also ==
- 11 mm caliber
- List of rifle cartridges
- Table of handgun and rifle cartridges
