= .458 Winchester Magnum =

Rifle cartridge

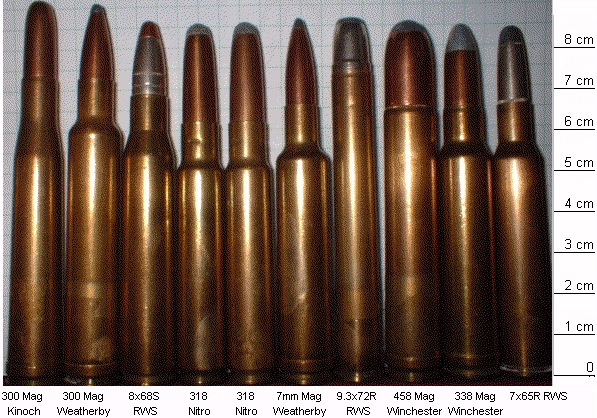
- .458 third from right
- Type: Rifle / Hunting
- Place of origin: USA

Production history
- Designer: Winchester
- Designed: 1956
- Produced: 1956–present

Specifications
- Parent case: .375 H&H Magnum
- Case type: Belted, straight-tapered
- Bullet diameter: .458 in (11.63 mm)
- Neck diameter: .481 in (12.2 mm)
- Base diameter: .513 in (13.0 mm)
- Rim diameter: .532 in (13.5 mm)
- Rim thickness: .220 in (5.6 mm)
- Case length: 2.500 in (63.5 mm)
- Overall length: 3.340 in (84.8 mm)
- Rifling twist: 1-14"
- Primer type: Large rifle magnum
- Maximum pressure: 60,000 psi (410 MPa)
- Maximum CUP: 53,000 CUP

Ballistic performance
Bullet mass/type	Velocity	Energy
300 gr (19 g) HP	2,606 ft/s (794 m/s)	4,525 ft⋅lbf (6,135 J)
350 gr (23 g) RN	2,557 ft/s (779 m/s)	5,083 ft⋅lbf (6,892 J)
400 gr (26 g) FN	2,468 ft/s (752 m/s)	5,411 ft⋅lbf (7,336 J)
500 gr (32 g) RN	2,192 ft/s (668 m/s)	5,336 ft⋅lbf (7,235 J)
- Test barrel length: 26"; Source(s): Accurate Powder

The .458 Winchester Magnum is a belted, straight-taper cased, Big Five game rifle cartridge. It was introduced commercially in 1956 by Winchester and first chambered in the Winchester Model 70 African rifle. It was designed to compete against the .450 Nitro Express and the .470 Nitro Express cartridges used in big bore British double rifles. The .458 Winchester Magnum remains one of the most popular large game cartridges, and most major ammunition manufacturers offer a selection of .458 ammunition.

== History ==
The .458 Winchester Magnum was designed for hunting dangerous game animals by emulating the performance of powerful English double rifle cartridges in a bolt-action rifle. The use of a bolt-action rifle offered hunters a cheaper alternative to the big-bore double rifle, and ammunition could be manufactured using available tooling. The .458 Winchester Magnum soon became a success as dangerous game hunters adopted the cartridge. Soon, game wardens, wildlife managers, and professional hunters switched to the .458 Winchester Magnum as their duty rifle. The cartridge would become the standard African dangerous game cartridge, in short order.

By 1970, issues with the cartridge began to surface. Winchester had been using compressed loads of ball powder as a propellant for .458 Winchester Magnum. Due to clumping of the powder charge and the erratic burn characteristics associated with such loads, performance of the cartridge came into question. While Winchester addressed this issue, the stigma remained, and the cartridge's performance on dangerous game was suspect. However, the .458 Winchester Magnum remained the standard of measure for dangerous game cartridges.

Recently, other .458 cartridges and various .416 cartridges have gained wider acceptance, but the .458 Win Mag remains one of the popular choices; with Winchester still manufacturing the Model 70 Safari Express with a .458 Win Mag chambering, alongside the .375 H&H Magnum and .416 Remington Magnum.

== Specifications ==
The .458 Winchester Magnum was designed from the outset to duplicate the performance level of the .450 Nitro Express and the .470 Nitro Express, which had become the mainstay of African dangerous game hunters. The .450 Nitro Express had been rated to launch a 480 gr (31.1 g) bullet at 2,150 ft/s (655 m/s) out of a 28 in (711 mm) barrel while the .470 Nitro Express would launch a 500 gr (32.4 g) bullet at 2,125 ft/s (648 m/s) out of a 31 in (787 mm) barrel. The design criteria for the .458 Winchester Magnum called for it to launch a 510 gr (33.0 g) bullet at 2,150 ft/s (655 m/s) out of a 26 in (660 mm) barrel.

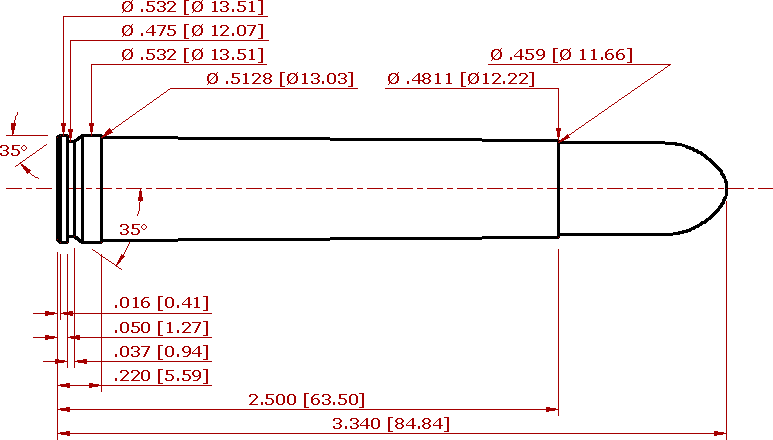
SAAMI compliant .458 Winchester Magnum cartridge schematic: All dimensions in inches [millimeters].

The .458 Winchester Magnum's case was based on a .375 H&H case shortened to 2.5 in (63.5 mm) and renecked (to reduce taper) to accept a .458 in (11.63 mm) bullet. The cartridge remains the largest of the standard length magnum cartridge family released by Winchester, which includes the somewhat obsolete .264 Winchester Magnum and the popular .338 Winchester Magnum.

SAAMI recommends a 6 groove with a twist ratio of 1:14 with a bore Ø of .450 in (11.43 mm) and a groove Ø of .458 in (11.63 mm) with each groove having an arc length of .150 in (3.81 mm). While case volume varies between manufacturers, the typical Winchester case capacity is 95 grain of H_{2}O (6.17 cm^{3}). Maximum recommended pressure given by SAAMI is 53,000 c.u.p. while the CIP mandates a maximum pressure of 4,300 bar (62,000 psi).

== Performance ==
The original specifications for the cartridge called for a 510 gr (33 g) bullet to be fired at a velocity of 2,150 ft/s (660 m/s) through a 26 in (660 mm) barrel. Winchester achieved and surpassed this performance with their .458 Magnum cartridge.

Current performance standards for the cartridge allow it to launch a 500 gr (32 g) bullet at a velocity of about 2,150 ft/s (660 m/s) through a 24 in (610 mm) barrel. The 500 gr (32 g) bullet is seen as the standard weight for a 45 caliber (11.43 mm) rifle bullet. This bullet has a sectional density of .341, which provides the bullet a high penetrative value at a given velocity. Among standard sporting cartridge bullets, the 45 caliber (11.43 mm) 500 gr (32 g) bullet has the highest sectional density. While bullets such as the 250 gr (16 g) 30 caliber (7.62 mm) bullet with a sectional density of .374 and even a 600 gr (39 g) 45 caliber (11.43 mm) with a sectional density of .409 exist these weights are not seen as a standard for those calibers. The .458 Winchester Magnum loaded with the 500 gr (32 g) solid bullet provides adequate penetration for dangerous game up to and including elephant.

Due to the cartridge's relatively short case and powder column, longer bullets and those with a lower weight to length ratio—such as mono-metal bullets like the A-Square Monolithic Solid and the Barnes Banded Solids—may take up valuable powder space and lead to lower velocities and reduced performance. Hence, the reason for companies such as A-Square loading the .458 Winchester Magnum and even the .458 Lott with the 465 gr (30.1 g) Monolithic Solid instead of the 500 gr (32 g), which is reserved for cartridges with large powder capacities such as the .450 Assegai and the .460 Weatherby Magnum. Bullets that tend to have a high weight to length ratios such as now discontinued 500 gr (32 g) Speer African Grand Slam solid tend to work better in the .458 Winchester Magnum.

With modern powders the .458 Winchester Magnum is capable of launching a 300 gr (19 g) bullet at 2,600 ft/s (790 m/s), a 350 gr (23 g) bullet at 2,500 ft/s (760 m/s), a 400 gr (26 g) bullet at 2,400 ft/s (730 m/s), and the 450 gr (29 g) bullet at 2,300 ft/s (700 m/s). However, as no mainline ammunition manufacturer provides sub-500 gr (32 g) .458 Winchester ammunition this is a choice for those who load their own ammunition or have access to custom-loaded ammunition.

== Sporting usage ==
The .458 Winchester Magnum was designed for use against heavy, thick skinned African game species such as elephant, rhinoceros, and African Cape buffalo. The exceptional sectional density of the 500 gr (32 g) bullet combined with a muzzle velocity of between 1,950–2,250 ft/s (590–690 m/s) provides the cartridge adequate penetration against these dangerous game species. Rifles produced for this cartridge usually weighed under 11 lb (5.0 kg). The combination of these factors helped the .458 Winchester Magnum become the most popular dangerous game cartridge on the African continent.

Unlike the more powerful .460 Weatherby Magnum, the .458 Winchester Magnum is not considered overly powerful for larger felids such as lion or leopard. However, bullet selection is important for these felids as they are not considered thick skinned species, with the largest of the lions weighing under 500 lb (230 kg). These species require bullets that open quickly upon impact, such as A-Square's Lion load.

While the .458 Winchester Magnum is considered overpowered for most North American game species, the cartridge has found use for the hunting of large bears, such as the polar and Alaskan brown bear, and American bison. A few guides in Alaska and Canada carry rifles chambered in this cartridge to provide defense against these largest bear species for themselves and their clients. The number one cartridge of professional guides in Alaska for Great Bears is the .338 Winchester Magnum.

As almost all dangerous game hunting is conducted at short ranges with most shootings occurring well within a distance of 60 yd (55 m), the .458 was not designed as a long range hunting cartridge. Its effective hunting range against large dangerous game is considered to be less than 110 yd (100 m).

== Ammunition ==
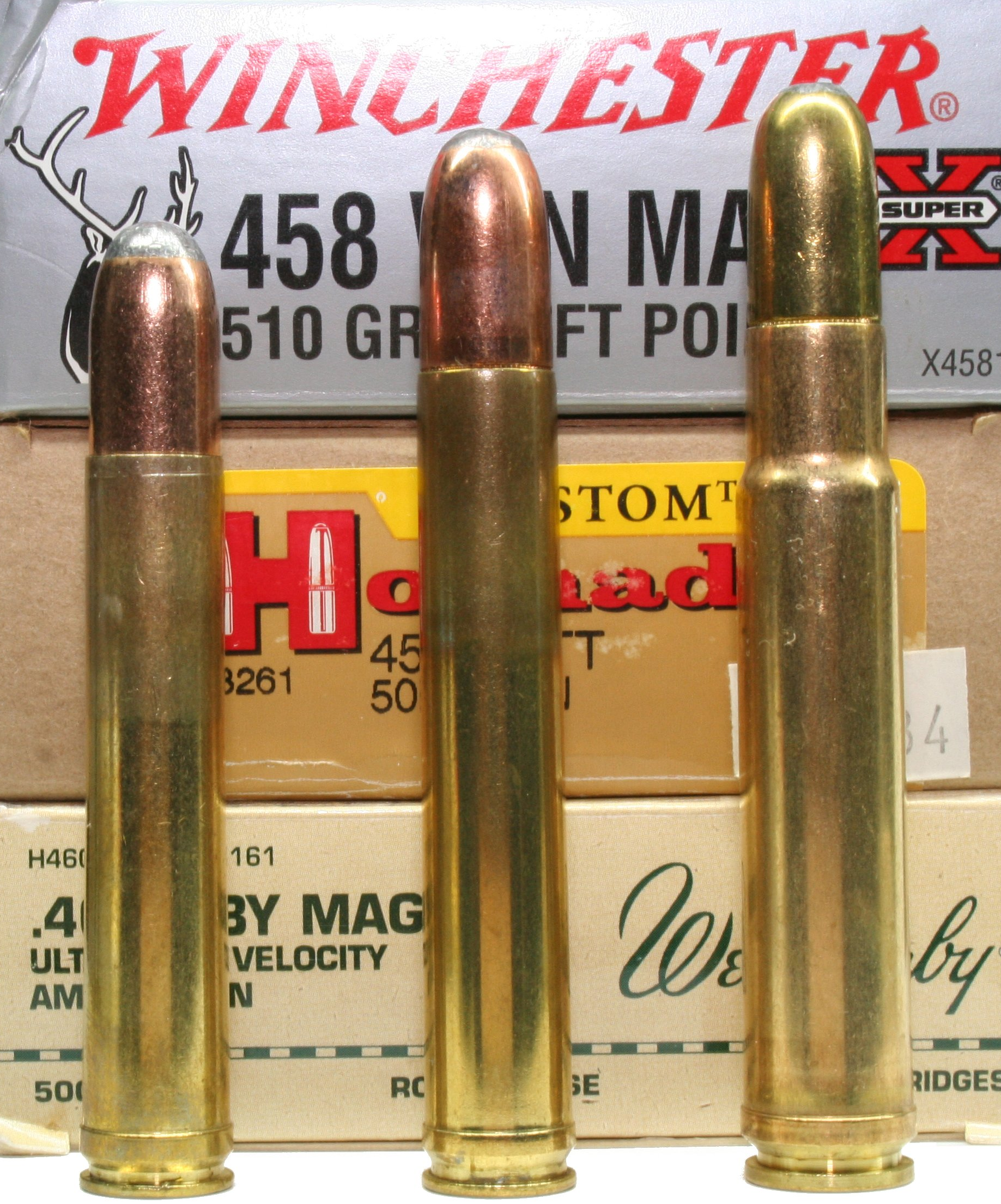
.458 Win. Mag., .458 Lott and a .460 Wby. Mag. for comparison.

Since the .458 Winchester Magnum was intended as a dangerous game hunting cartridge, almost all ammunition manufactured for the cartridge is manufactured for these game species. Bullets used to load the .458 Winchester Magnum by ammunition manufacturers generally range between 450–510 gr (29–33 g).

Winchester currently offers ammunition in the traditional 510 gr (33 g) Soft Point and the new 500 gr (32 g) Nosler Partition and Nosler Solid. The Winchester 500 gr (32 g) loading has a muzzle velocity of 2,240 ft/s (680 m/s) and muzzle energy of 5,570 foot-pounds force (7,550 J). Winchester's 510 gr (33 g) X4581 ammunition, which has a muzzle velocity of 2,040 ft/s (620 m/s), is rated for CXP3 (large, non-dangerous) game species.

Hornady offers what they call a "heavy magnum" loading, which features a 500 gr (32 g) bullet with a velocity of approx 2,260 ft/s (690 m/s). They use a special double-based cooler burning propellant ("powder") not available to the public for handloading. This innovative loading allows the .458 Winchester Magnum to attain 5,670 foot-pounds force (7,690 J) of muzzle energy. Federal Cartridge now offers a 500-grain (32 g) Barnes X bullet with a sectional density and ballistic coefficient that allows it to maintain approximately 2,000 foot-pounds force (2,700 J) of energy at 500 yards (460 m) and a flatter trajectory than had been previously attained with this cartridge and bullet weight. Numerous companies offer rifles in this caliber, including the Winchester Model 70, which was used by Clint Eastwood in Dirty Harry.

The rounds for the .458 Win mag are more expensive than cartridges like the popular .30-06, making handloading a worthwhile effort for some. Though more expensive than deer hunting ammunition, the .458 Winchester Magnum is significantly less expensive than its competitors. For many decades the .458 has been the most popular rifle cartridge of professional hunters pursuing heavy, dangerous game in Africa because of its performance, price, and availability. When British ammunition companies, including Kynoch, began closing in the 1960s, Winchester and the .458 Winchester Magnum filled the gap left behind.

The recoil of factory loads is about 70 foot pounds. Handloads can make the cartridge more comfortable to shoot, for example by using a 300-grain (19 g) cast lead bullet at 1,282 ft/s (391 m/s). This load mimics the .45/70 in both power and recoil.

.458 Winchester Magnum Ammunition
Ammunition	Bullet	Muzzle Velocity	Muzzle Energy	MPBR/Zero	Notes
Winchester X4581	Winchester 510 gr (33 g) SP	2,040 ft/s (620 m/s)	4,712 ft⋅lbf (6,389 J)	195 yd (178 m)/167 yd (153 m)	Currently in production
Winchester S458WSLSP	Nosler 500 gr (32 g) Partition	2,240 ft/s (680 m/s)	5,570 ft⋅lbf (7,550 J)	218 yd (199 m)/185 yd (169 m)	Currently in production
Winchester S458WSLS	Nosler 500 gr (32 g) Solid	2,240 ft/s (680 m/s)	5,570 ft⋅lbf (7,550 J)	213 yd (195 m)/181 yd (166 m)	Currently in production
Federal P458T1	TBBC 400 gr (26 g) SP	2,250 ft/s (690 m/s)	4,496 ft⋅lbf (6,096 J)	212 yd (194 m)/180 yd (160 m)	Currently in production
Federal P458T2	TBBC 500 gr (32 g) SP	2,090 ft/s (640 m/s)	4,849 ft⋅lbf (6,574 J)	206 yd (188 m)/175 yd (160 m)	Currently in production
Federal P458T3	TBSS 500 gr (32 g) Solid	1,950 ft/s (590 m/s)	4,221 ft⋅lbf (5,723 J)	194 yd (177 m)/165 yd (151 m)	Currently in production
Federal P458D	Barnes 500 gr (32 g) TSX	2,050 ft/s (620 m/s)	4,665 ft⋅lbf (6,325 J)	206 yd (188 m)/175 yd (160 m)	Currently in production
Federal P458E	Barnes 500 gr (32 g) BS	2,050 ft/s (620 m/s)	4,665 ft⋅lbf (6,325 J)	205 yd (187 m)/174 yd (159 m)	Currently in production
Federal P458SA	Swift 500 gr (32 g) A Frame	2,090 ft/s (640 m/s)	4,849 ft⋅lbf (6,574 J)	207 yd (189 m)/176 yd (161 m)	Currently in production
Norma 20111102	Barnes 500 gr (32 g) BS	2,067 ft/s (630 m/s)	4,745 ft⋅lbf (6,433 J)	207 yd (189 m)/176 yd (161 m)	Currently in production
Norma 20111202	Swift 500 gr (32 g) A Frame	2,116 ft/s (645 m/s)	4,972 ft⋅lbf (6,741 J)	209 yd (191 m)/178 yd (163 m)	Currently in production
Values courtesy of the respective manufacturer. MPBR/Zero values courtesy of Big Game Info. Temperature: 59 °F (15 °C) Altitude: 1,000 ft (300 m)^{†} Discontinued

== Criticism ==
The .458 Winchester Magnum has had critics in its over 50 years of existence. By the late 1960s, professional hunters such as Jack Lott and others, suspected performance issues with .458 Winchester Magnum ammunition, particularly as produced by Winchester.

Winchester loaded the cartridges with a ball powder that required compression to fit enough in the .458 short case to provide required performance. In time, however, the compressed powder charge "caked," causing erratic burn and poor performance levels. By the 1970s, Winchester rectified this issue by manufacturing the cartridge with non-clumping propellant.

While the design specifications had called for a 510 gr (33 g) bullet at 2,150 ft/s (660 m/s) through a 26 in (660 mm) barrel, hunters wanting a lighter, handier faster swinging rifle were gravitating towards rifles sporting shorter barrels. Barrel lengths 18–24 in (460–610 mm) became the norm with hardly any rifle manufacturer producing .458 rifles with barrels greater than 24 in (610 mm). Shorter barrels, as expected, produced reduced performance levels due to lower attainable velocities. When fired from these shorter barrels, chronograph velocities fell from 2,050–1,850 ft/s (620–560 m/s), in line with expectations. However, the .458 Winchester Magnum cartridge was blamed for the loss of performance, and Winchester was accused of over-stating the cartridge's performance.

Due to the negative publicity, Winchester increased the performance of the .458 Winchester Magnum, which allowed the 500 gr (32 g) bullet to achieve 2,240 ft/s (680 m/s). While Winchester, like most .458 Winchester Magnum ammunition manufacturers (except Norma), continues to state velocities achieved from the 26 in (660 mm) test barrel, the velocity from a 24 in (610 mm) barrel is in keeping with the original expectations of the cartridge.

== See also ==
- 11 mm caliber
- .458×2-inch American
- .450 Marlin
- .458 Lott
- .458 SOCOM
- .50 Beowulf
- List of rifle cartridges
- Table of handgun and rifle cartridges
