= SLEM-1 =

- Type: Battle rifle
- Place of origin: Belgium

Production history
- Designer: Dieudonné Saive
- Designed: 1944

Specifications
- Cartridge: 7.92×57mm Mauser
- Caliber: 7.92mm
- Action: Gas-operated
- Feed system: 10 round detachable magazine (stripper fed)
- Sights: Iron sights

The SLEM-1 (Self Loading Experimental Model 1) was a semi-automatic battle rifle. The weapon is gas-operated, semi-automatic and has a 10-round magazine.

== Development ==
Fabrique Nationale's Belgian design team, led by Dieudonné Saive, worked in Britain throughout the war, having escaped the German occupation of Belgium in 1940. They worked for the Small Arms Design Department which had been moved from Enfield to the drill hall at Cheshunt, about five miles away. When the British General Staff decided in 1944 that the future British infantry cartridge would be the 8×57mm IS, already in production for the Besa machine gun and generally more suitable to autoloading weapons than rimmed .303 British cartridge, the Belgian team designed the SLEM-1 (Self Loading Enfield Model 1).

When the 8×33mm Kurz was tested everything changed and the British set up the Small Arms Calibre panel that led to the .270 in (6.9 mm) and .280 in (7.1 mm) rounds. The Belgian team then redesigned the SLEM to become the prototype FAL, first in 8mm Kurz and then in .280 British. The extractor groove of the .280 was changed to meet US specification and became the .280/30.

After the war, the SLEM was further developed into the FN Model 1949 and subsequently the FN FAL.

== See also ==
- EM-2 rifle – (United Kingdom)
- FN Model 1949 – (Belgium)
- FN FAL – (Belgium)
- List of battle rifles
