= FN Model 1949 =

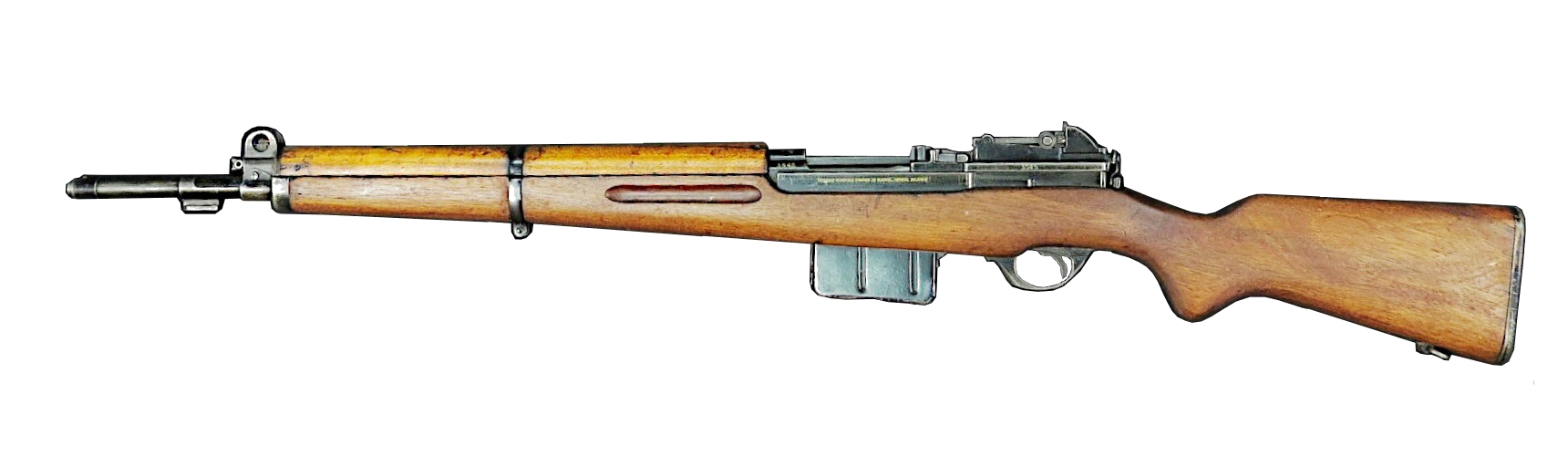
- Type: Battle rifle
- Place of origin: Belgium

Service history
- In service: 1948 — Present
- Used by: See Users
- Wars: Korean War; Darul Islam rebellion Suez Crisis; Permesta rebellion PRRI rebellion Congo Crisis; Dominican Civil War; Falklands War

Production history
- Designer: Dieudonné Saive
- Designed: 1947
- Manufacturer: FN Herstal
- Produced: 1948–1961
- No. built: 176,000

Specifications
- Mass: 4.31 kg (9 lb 8 oz)
- Length: 1116 mm (43.5 in)
- Barrel length: 590 mm (23.2 in)
- Cartridge: .30-06 Springfield; 7.92×57mm Mauser; 7×57mm Mauser; 7.62×51mm NATO; 7.65×53mm Argentine
- Action: Gas-operated short-stroke piston, tilting bolt
- Feed system: 10-round fixed box magazine, 20-round detachable box magazine in Argentine 7.62×51mm NATO conversions
- Sights: Iron sights / OIP 4x Telescopic sight on Belgium Sniper rifle

The Fabrique Nationale Model 1949 (often referred to as the FN-49, SAFN, or AFN (automatic rifle version) is an autoloading battle rifle designed by Belgian small arms designer Dieudonné Saive in 1947. It was adopted by the militaries of Argentina, Belgium, the Belgian Congo, Brazil, Colombia, Egypt, Indonesia, Luxembourg, and Venezuela. The selective fire version produced for Belgium was known as the AFN.

While well regarded for its high build quality and reliability in comparison to the rifles of the time, its marketability was limited, as it was not developed in time for use in World War II but later, as many militaries had already begun the switch to selective fire battle rifles. About half of FN-49s were produced as selective fire automatic rifles, but the small 10 round box magazine limited the usefulness of the fully automatic feature.

The FN-49 found itself in direct competition with a number of more modern rifles such as the Heckler & Koch G3 and Fabrique Nationale de Herstal's own FN FAL, resulting in limited sales.

== History ==
=== Development ===
Dieudonne Saive, Fabrique Nationale's then chief firearm designer, experimented with a number of recoil-operated rifle designs in the early 1930s. While little came of these experiments, they would become the basis for a gas-operated semi-automatic rifle, which he patented in 1936 and prototyped in 1937. (Photographs of these prototypes still exist, and they show a number of characteristics that would later appear in the FN-49.)

FN's new rifle was still in development in late 1938 – early 1939, and a version with a 5-round magazine was about to be marketed. When German armies invaded Poland, these plans were delayed to increase production of bolt-action rifles and machine guns.

The German invasion of Belgium in May 1940 interrupted any plans for the production of the new model, as Liège, home of FN's factory, was occupied by the German military. Despite this setback, Saive was able to escape to England via Portugal in 1941, where he continued work on what would become the FN-49.

By 1943, Saive was back to working on his experimental rifle, now in 7.92×57mm Mauser. Late that year, the Royal Small Arms Factory, Enfield ordered 50 prototypes (designated "EXP-1" and sometimes referred to as "SLEM-1" or "Self-Loading Experimental Model"). Based on tests with these prototypes, Enfield placed an order for 2,000 rifles for troop trials, but a last-minute problem with the moderation of the gas pressure (as well as the impending end of World War II) led to the cancellation of this order. Despite this, Saive (who had returned to Liège shortly after its liberation in September 1944) continued work on the rifle, and finalized the design for the FN-49 in 1947.

The FN Model 1949 is not ammunition specific, since it has an adjustable gas port or valve to adjust the rifle to various propellant and projectile specific pressure behavior, in which the gas port can be adjusted with a special wrench. This also requires removing the upper forward handguard for the adjustment.

=== Production lifetime ===
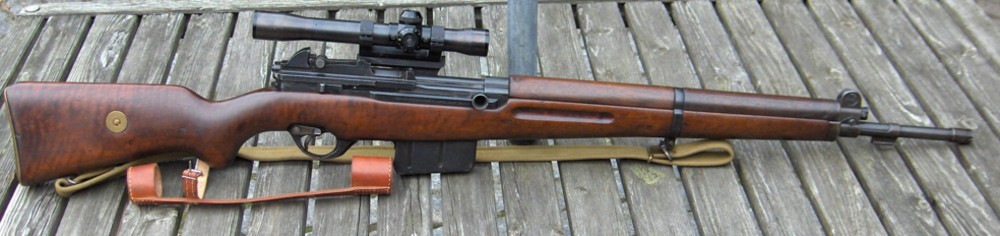
Egyptian SAFN with telescopic sight

The contracts for the SAFN 1949 rifle started in 1948 with the first order placed by Venezuela on March 31, 1948, delivered exactly four months later. The last production contract of complete rifles was ordered by Indonesia on December 19, 1960, and delivered by February 19, 1961.

Some sources claim pre-production models for demonstration and testing were produced in 1948, making rifle ready for contract orders and mass production. Other sources however claim the rifle was trialed with the Royal Netherlands Navy in 1947, The Netherlands Navy trials did not however lead to a sales contract.

FN started looking for customers, but the communist states were not an option (as they were required to buy or build Soviet designs). The Western European nations had vast stocks of World War II firearms. They also could get American and British weapons aid, which was inexpensive or free. So FN decided to market to the non-aligned countries, who did not want to commit to Western or Soviet doctrine, which was inevitable when accepting aid.

The first contract production of the SAFN 1949 rifle was delivered to Venezuela by May 31, 1949. It composed of 2,000 rifles in caliber 7×57mm Mauser, with an additional 2,012 rifles including cut-away training demonstration rifles delivered by July 31, 1949. The remaining rifles of the Venezuelan contract of 8,012 rifles were sold as surplus in the United States, and are prized by US collectors, sportsmen, and hunters because of the unique features ordered by Venezuela, the general good to excellent condition of the surplus rifles, and the superb accuracy of the 7×57mm Mauser cartridge.

The second contract was for the Egyptian government, consisting of 100 rifles chambered to fire the 7.92×57mm Mauser cartridge (also popularly known as 8mm Mauser). It was ordered on May 30, 1948, and delivered by June 10, 1949. While initially a small contract delivery, Egypt would eventually purchase 37,602 SAFN 1949 rifles total.

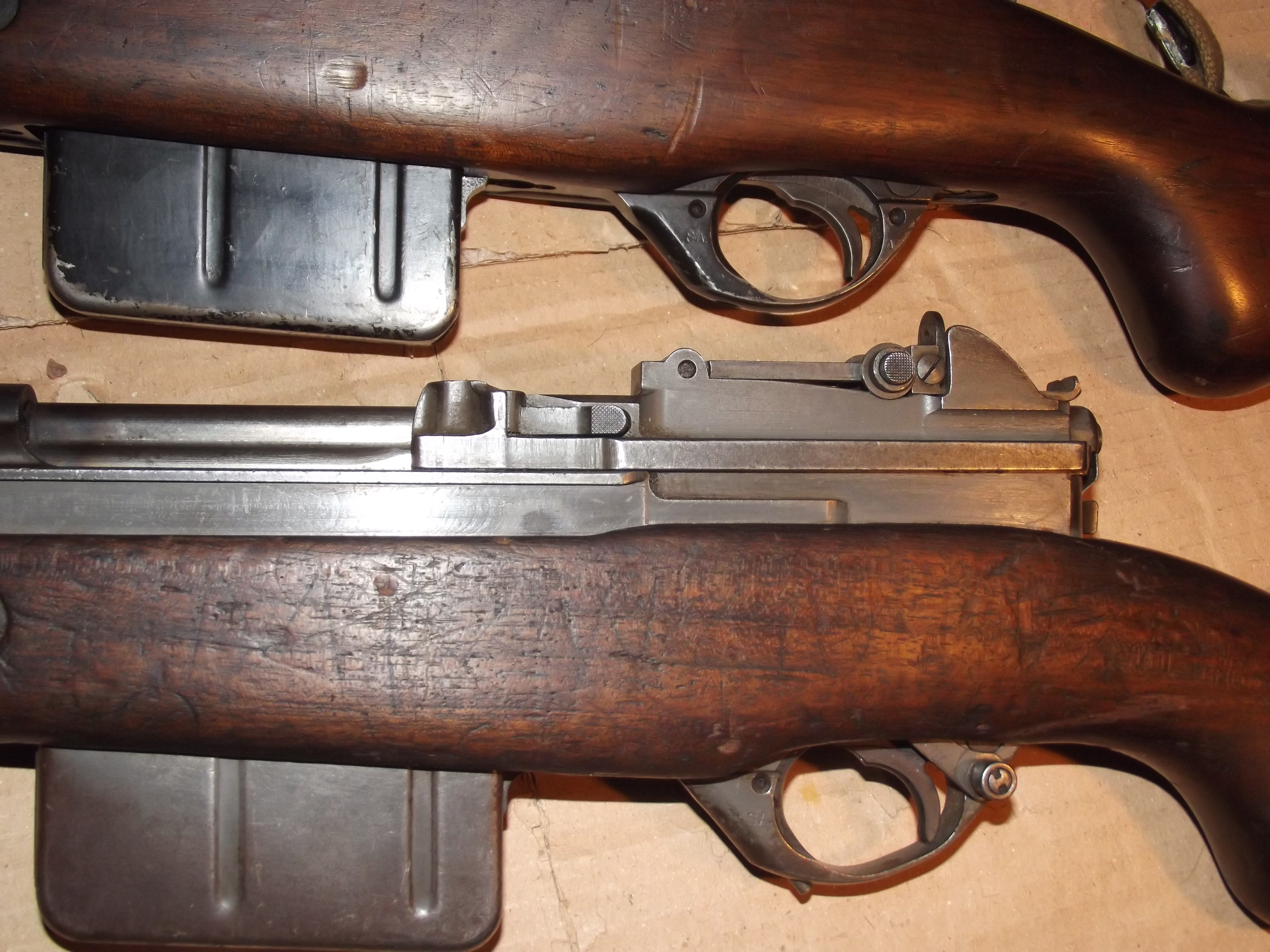
Two FN-49 rifles from Belgian Army (ABL) contract. Upper weapon has no selective fire lever fitted, Lower weapon shows selective fire lever in Fully Automatic position.

The third contract was ordered by the Belgian government, starting with thirty test rifles on May 12, 1949, received on August 31, 1949, and a second larger order for 100 test rifles delivered by December 12, 1949. The Belgians would make a contract for production of the SAFN 1949 rifle on August 24, 1950, for 6,000 rifles in caliber .30-06 Springfield. The Belgians designated the rifle as the ABL SAFN-49, ABL is an acronym for the Belgian Army in both French and Dutch; "AB" for the French "Armée Belge" and "BL" for the Dutch "Belgisch Leger". The contracts for the SAFN 1949 rifle made by FN for Belgium totaled 87,777 rifles total, composing almost half of all FN-49 rifles ever produced. A selective fire version, known as the AFN was produced for the Belgian military. It is sometimes stated that all the ABL weapons were either built as a selective fire automatic rifle or that all could be readily convertible to selective fire automatic rifle. The AFN was also used by the Marines of the Belgian Navy or ZM-FN. (Zeemacht - Force Navale).

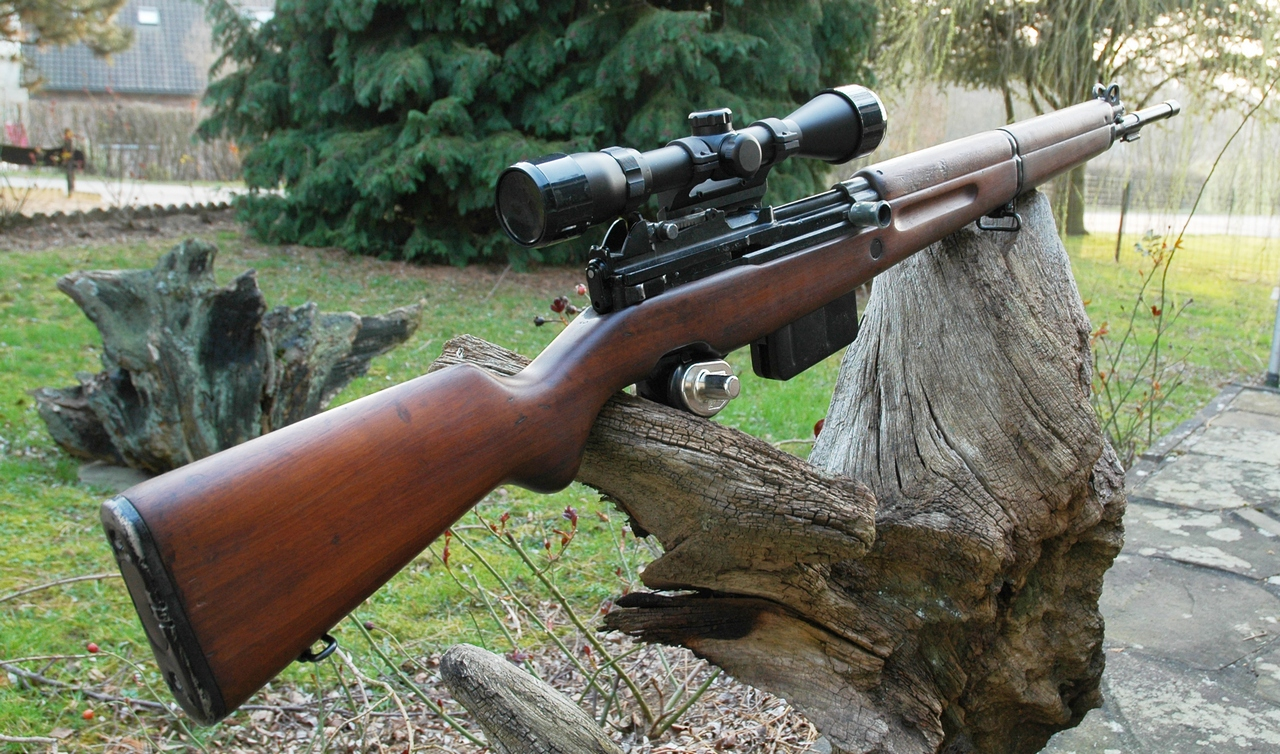
SAFN chambered in .30-06 Springfield

Luxembourg was the fourth country to order the SAFN 1949 rifles, with the first order placed on October 4, 1950, and taking possession of the first 1,500 rifles by May 5, 1951. The Grand Duchy of Luxembourg would eventually purchase a total of 6,306 rifles, including rifles specifically for Luxembourg's Gendarmerie, which were FN-49s that comprised standard models, training cut-away rifles, and sniper variants, all in caliber .30-06 Springfield. The Luxembourg models, except for the Gendarmerie contract, were sold as surplus in the United States. Some were distributed to purchasers in larger US chain retail outlets. The Luxembourg models are sought after for two reasons: first, because of the particularly good condition of the Luxembourg surplus rifles; and second, because these FN-49 rifles were chambered for the .30-06 Springfield, a cartridge popular in the US sport shooting and hunting communities. Very few .30-06 FN-49 rifles from other contracts have been imported into the United States, making the Luxembourg rifles the only affordable option for an FN-49 in that caliber.

Indonesia, the Belgian Congo, and Colombia would make up the fifth to seventh contracts, all produced in caliber .30-06 Springfield.

Argentina requested the eighth contract, ordering 5,536 SAFN 1949 rifles in caliber 7.65×53mm Argentine on July 29, 1953, for use by the Argentine Navy after an initial order of one test rifle in 1948.

Several prototypes were made in other calibers, including at least five in 6.5×55mm Swedish for testing in Sweden, one in caliber 7.5×54mm French for testing in Syria, one in caliber .30-06 Springfield for testing in the United States, and one in caliber 7.62×51mm NATO for testing in Brazil.

A very small yet unknown quantity of commercial rifles chambered in .30-06 were imported to the US and Australia by Browning some time during the 1960s. These rifles are incredibly rare and few examples have been documented. They are configured with a polished checkered stock with a rollover cheek piece and side mount.

==== Argentinian modification ====
Contrary to some speculation, FN did not contract or produce the Argentine conversion of SAFN 1949 rifles from 7.65×53mm Argentine to 7.62×51mm NATO. While FN did receive and then later deliver an order for a conversion of a single rifle in March 1967, the remaining armory stock of the Argentine rifles were converted domestically by Metalúrgica Centro, a company formerly known as Fábrica de armas Halcón. Metalúrgica Centro provided and installed in each rifle a new barrel in 7.62×51mm NATO, modified each ejector, and modified each trigger guard to take a new 20 round detachable box magazine. The converted rifles were provided with proprietary 20 round detachable box magazines manufactured by Metalúrgica Centro to fit the SAFN 1949 rifle conversions. The 20 round steel magazines are proprietary, but were made to share the magazine loading charger with the FN FAL rifle used by the Argentine Army. These chargers are the same as for the Mauser Kar-98k, and thus not interchangeable with standard NATO stripper clips. These are very inexpensive via surplus dealers. Not only are Mauser 98 stripper clips not interchangeable with 7.62×51mm NATO standard, but also not with old 7.65×53mm Argentine versions.

A very small number were later used in the Falklands War as sniper rifles by the Argentinians.

== Users ==
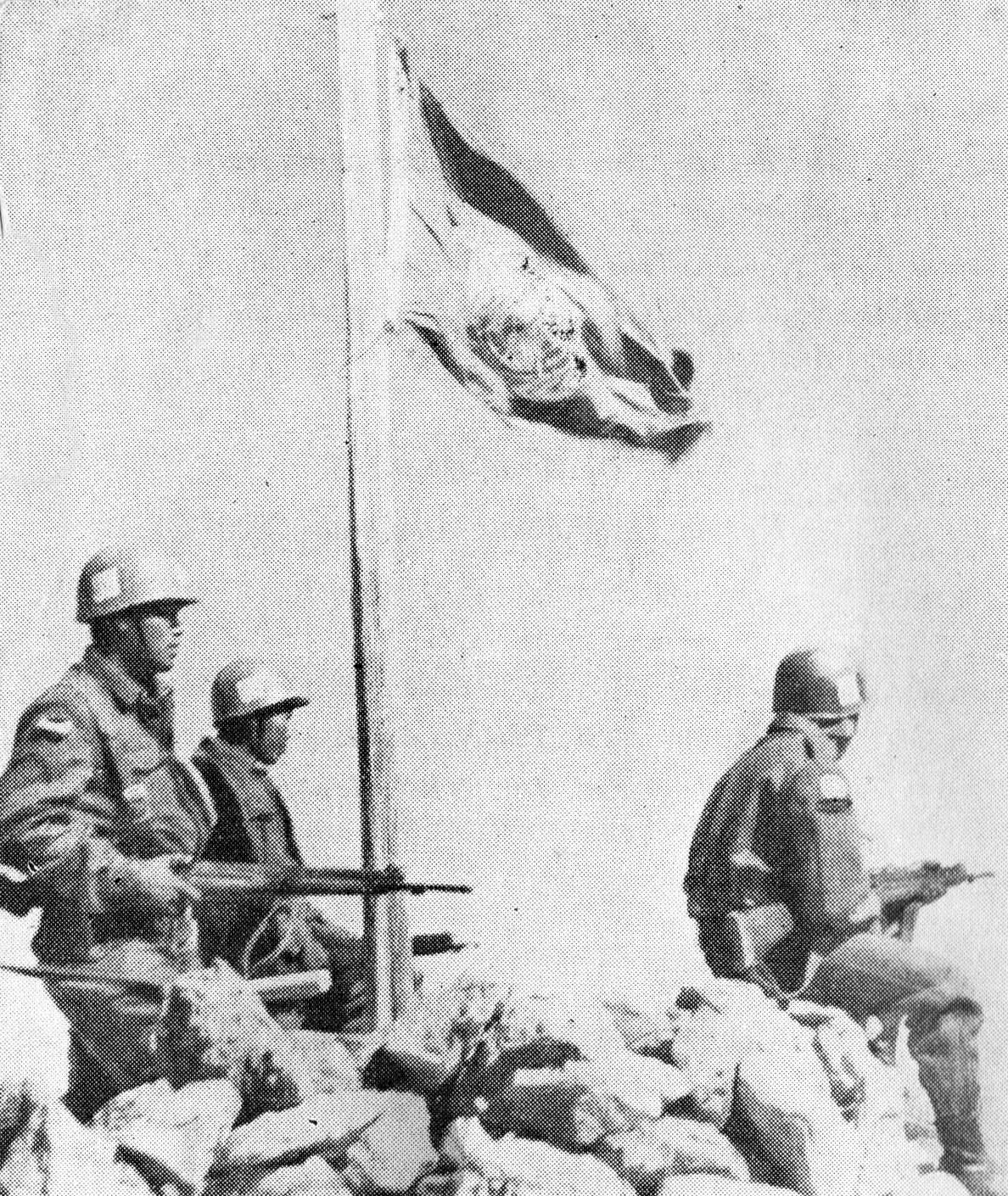
UNEF soldiers from Indonesia carrying FN-49

- Argentina
- Belgium
- Brazil
- Colombia
- Democratic Republic of the Congo
- Egypt
- Ethiopia
- Indonesia
- Luxembourg
- Somalia SAFN variant from FN
- Venezuela
- Zaire

== Similar weapons ==
- SVT-40
- SKS
- MAS-49 rifle
- Ag m/42
- Hakim rifle
- Rasheed Carbine
- Gewehr 43
- M1 Garand
- vz. 52 rifle
