= FN FAL =

Battle rifle

FAL
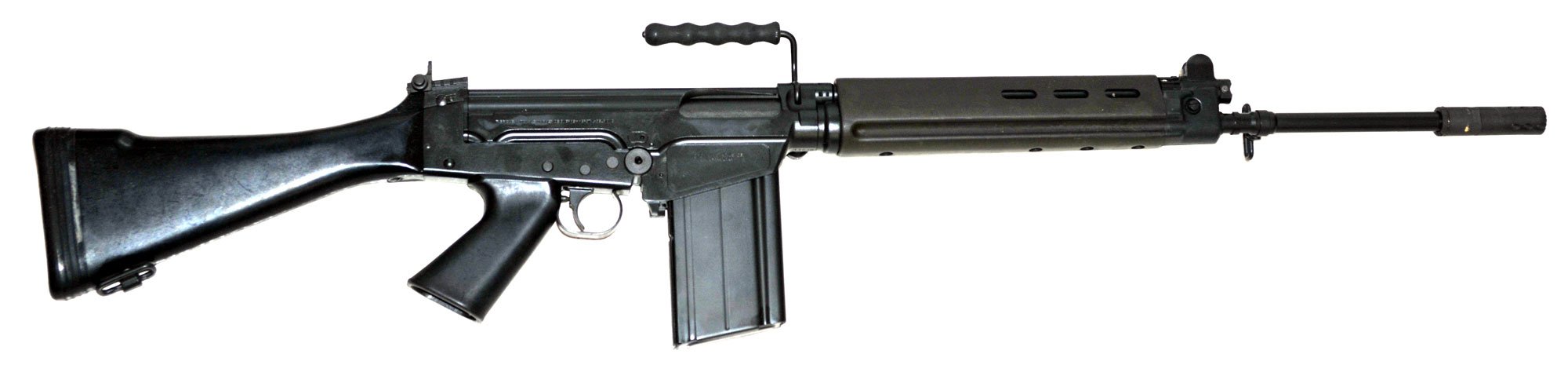
- A standard FAL (50.00 model) produced by FN
- Type: Battle rifle
- Place of origin: Belgium

Service history
- In service: 1953–present
- Used by: 90+ countries (See Users)
- Wars: See Conflicts

Production history
- Designer: Dieudonné Saive
- Designed: 1947–1953
- Manufacturer: FN Herstal; IMBEL; Fabricaciones Militares; Rifle Factory Ishapore
- Produced: 1953–1988 (FN Herstal); 1953–present (licensed manufacturers)
- No. built: 7,000,000
- Variants: See Variants

Specifications (FAL 50)
- Mass: 4.25 kg (9.4 lb)
- Length: 1,090 mm (43 in)
- Barrel length: 533 mm (21.0 in)
- Cartridge: 7.62×51mm NATO.280 British
- Action: Short-stroke gas piston, closed tilting breechblock
- Rate of fire: 650–700 rounds/min
- Muzzle velocity: 840 m/s (2,755.9 ft/s)
- Maximum firing range: 1000 meters
- Feed system: 20- or 30-round detachable box magazine, 50-round drum magazine.
- Sights: ramped aperture rear sight (adjustable from 200 to 600 m/yd in 100 m/yd increments); post front sight

The FAL (French: Fusil Automatique Léger 'Light Automatic Rifle') is a battle rifle designed in Belgium by Dieudonné Saive and manufactured by FN Herstal and others since 1953.

During the Cold War, the FAL was adopted by many countries of the North Atlantic Treaty Organization (NATO), with the notable exception of the United States. It is one of the most widely used rifles in history, having been used by more than 90 countries. It received the title "the right arm of the free world" from its adoption by many countries that identified as part of the free world. It is chambered in 7.62×51mm NATO, although originally designed for the intermediate .280 British.

A license-built version of the FAL was produced and adopted by the United Kingdom and throughout the Commonwealth as the L1A1 Self-Loading Rifle.

== History ==
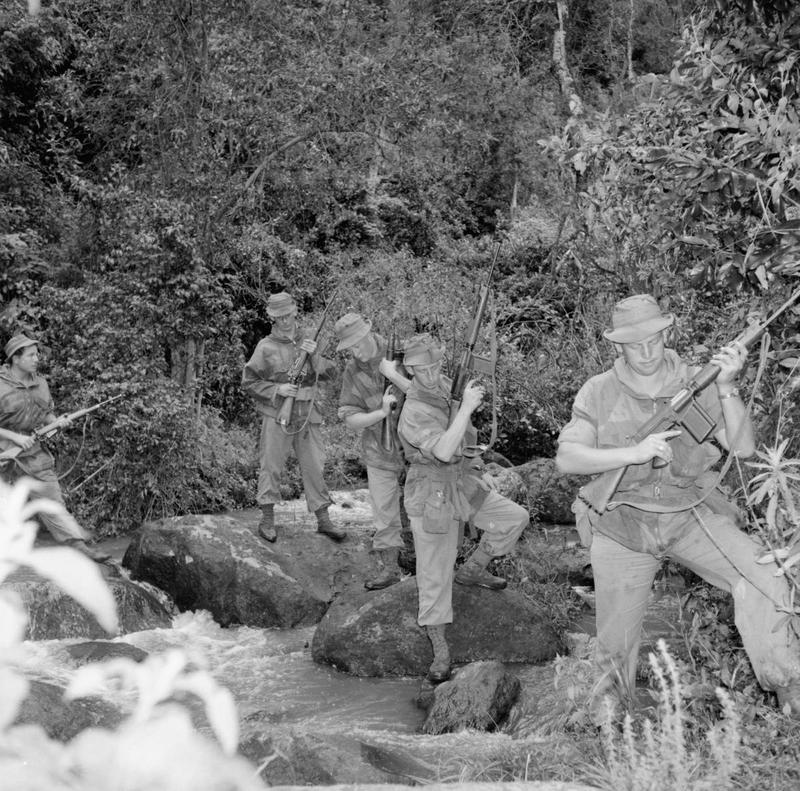
A British Army patrol crossing a stream during the Mau Mau rebellion, the front soldier carrying an X8E1 (Belgian-made 7.62mm FN FAL)

In 1946, the first FAL prototype was completed. It was designed to fire the intermediate 7.92×33mm Kurz cartridge developed and used by the forces of Germany during World War II with the Sturmgewehr 44 assault rifle. After testing this prototype in 1948, the British Army urged FN to build additional prototypes, including one in bullpup configuration, chambered for their new .280 British (7×43mm) caliber intermediate cartridge. After evaluating the single bullpup prototype, FN decided to return instead to their original, conventional design for future production.

In 1950, the United Kingdom presented the redesigned FN rifle and the British EM-2, both in .280 British calibre, to the United States for comparison testing against the favoured United States Army design of the time—Earle Harvey's T25. It was hoped that a common cartridge and rifle could be standardized for issue to the armies of all NATO member countries. After this testing was completed, U.S. Army officials suggested that FN should redesign their rifle to fire the U.S. prototype ".30 Light Rifle" cartridge. FN decided to hedge their bets with the U.S., and in 1951 even made a deal that the U.S. could produce FALs royalty-free, given that the UK appeared to be favouring their own EM-2. This decision appeared to be correct when the British Army decided to adopt the EM-2 (as Rifle No.9 Mk1) and the .280 British cartridge.

This decision was later rescinded after the Labour Party lost the 1951 General Election and Winston Churchill returned as Prime Minister. It is believed that there was a quid pro quo agreement between Churchill and U.S. President Harry Truman in 1952 that the British accept the .30 Light Rifle cartridge as NATO standard in return for the U.S. acceptance of the FN FAL as NATO standard. The .30 Light Rifle cartridge was later standardized as the 7.62 mm NATO. However, the U.S. insisted on continued rifle tests. The FAL chambered for the .30 Light Rifle went up against the redesigned T25 (now redesignated as the T47), and an M1 Garand variant, the T44. Eventually, the T44 won, becoming the M14. However, in the meantime, most other NATO countries were evaluating and selecting the FAL.

Formally introduced by its designer Dieudonné Saive in 1951, and produced two years later, the FAL has been described as the "Right Arm of the Free World". The FAL battle rifle has its Warsaw Pact counterpart in the AKM, each being fielded by dozens of countries and produced in many of them. A few, such as Israel and South Africa, manufactured and issued both designs at various times.

== Design details ==
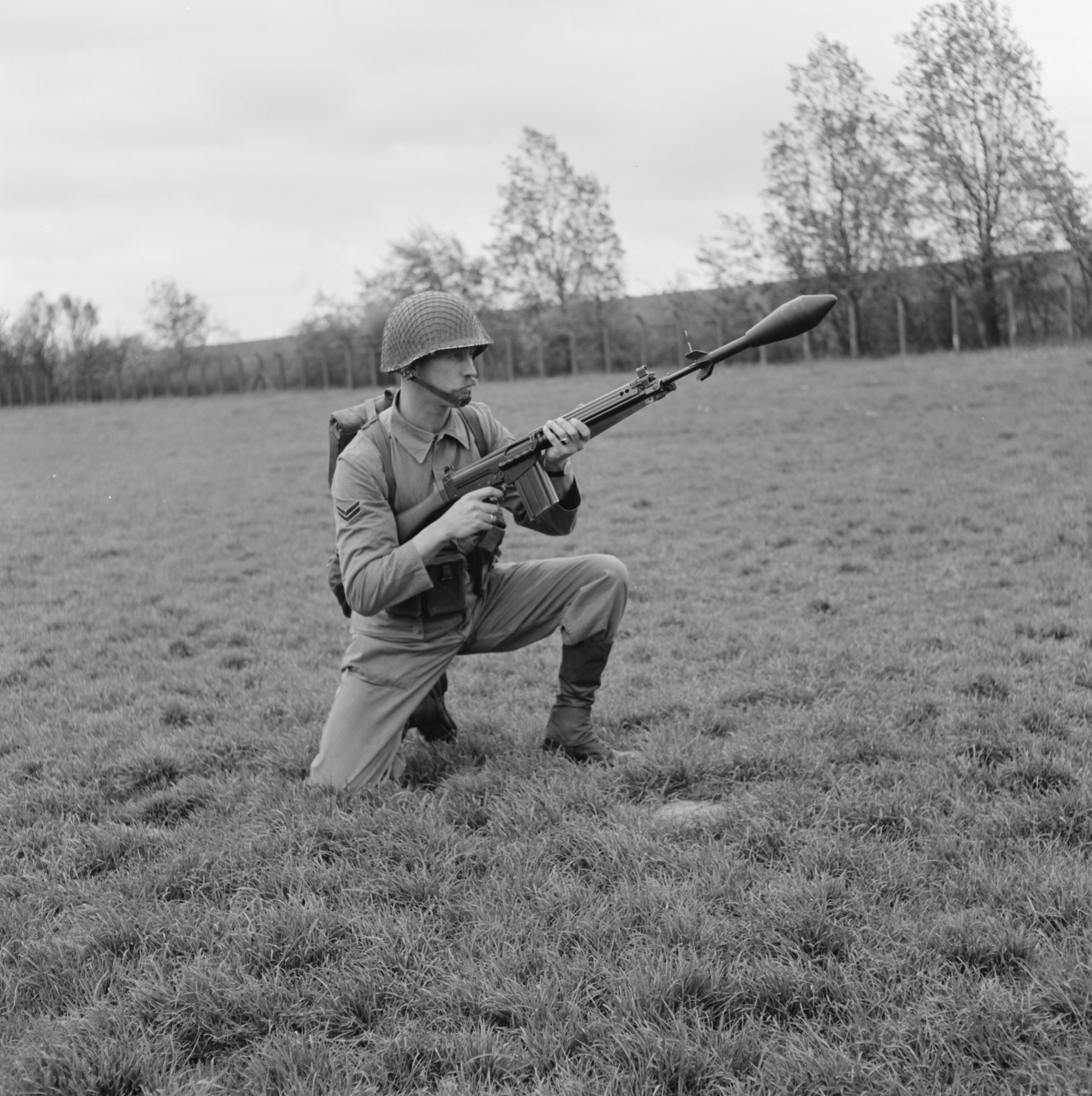
Dutch Marine with FN FAL fitted with a rifle grenade.

The FAL operates by means of a gas-operated action very similar to that of the Soviet SVT-40. The gas system is driven by a short-stroke, spring-loaded piston housed above the barrel, and the locking mechanism is tilting breechblock. To lock, it drops down into a solid shoulder of metal in the heavy receiver much like the bolts of the Soviet SKS carbine and French MAS-49 series of semi-automatic rifles. The gas system is fitted with a gas regulator behind the front sight base, allowing adjustment of the gas system in response to environmental conditions. The piston system can be bypassed completely, using the gas plug, to allow for the firing of rifle grenades and manual operation.

The FAL's magazine capacity ranges from five to 30 rounds, with most magazines holding 20 rounds. In fixed stock versions of the FAL, the recoil spring is housed in the stock, while in folding-stock versions it is housed in the receiver cover, necessitating a slightly different receiver cover, recoil spring, and bolt carrier, and a modified lower receiver for the stock.

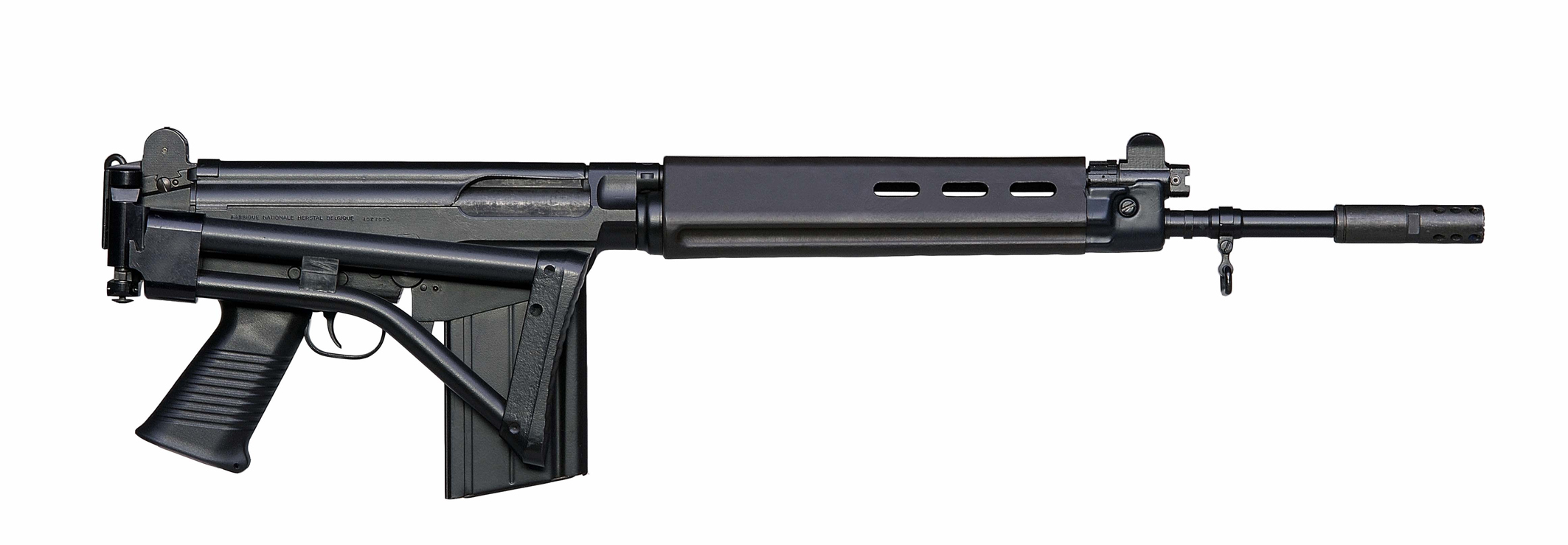
Short barrel FAL Para with folding stock

For field stripping, the FAL can be opened. During opening the rifle rotates around a two-piece pivot lock and pin assembly located between the trigger guard and magazine well to give access to the action and piston system. This opening method causes a suboptimal iron sight line as the rear sight element is mounted on the lower receiver and the front sight element of the sight line is mounted on the upper receiver/barrel and hence are fixed to two different movable subassemblies. The sight radius for the FAL 50.00 and FAL 50.41 models is 553 mm (21.8 in) and for the 50.61 and FAL 50.63 models 549 mm (21.6 in).

FAL rifles have also been manufactured in both light and heavy-barrel configurations, with the heavy barrel intended for automatic fire as a section or squad light support weapon. Most heavy barrel FALs are equipped with bipods, although some light barrel models were equipped with bipods, such as the Austrian StG 58 and the German G1, and a bipod was later made available as an accessory. Among other 7.62×51mm NATO battle rifles at the time, the FAL had relatively light recoil, due to the user-adjustable gas system being able to be tuned via a regulator in fore-end of the rifle, which allowed for excess gas which would simply increase recoil to bleed off. The regulator is an adjustable gas port opening that adjusts the rifle to function reliably with various propellant and projectile specific pressure behavior, making the FAL not ammunition specific. In fully automatic mode, however, the shooter receives considerable abuse from recoil, and the weapon climbs off-target quickly, making automatic fire only of marginal effectiveness. Many military forces using the FAL eventually eliminated full-automatic firearms training in the light-barrel FAL.

== Variants ==
=== FN production variants ===
Depending on the variant and the country of adoption, the FAL was issued as either semi-automatic only or select-fire (capable of both semi-automatic and fully automatic firing modes).

==== LAR 50.41 & 50.42 (FAL HBAR & FALO) ====
Also known as FALO as an abbreviation from the French Fusil Automatique Lourd, it had a heavy barrel for sustained fire with a 30-round magazine as a squad automatic weapon; Known in Canada as the C2A1, it was their primary squad automatic weapon until it was phased out during the 1980s in favor of the C9, which has better accuracy and higher ammunition capacity than the C2. In the Australian Army, as the L2A1, it was their primary squad automatic weapon in the 1960s. However it was generally disliked and replaced by the F89 Minimi in the late 1980s. The L2A1 or 'heavy barrel' FAL was used by several Commonwealth nations and was found to frequently experience a failure to feed after firing two rounds from a full magazine when in automatic mode. The 50.41 is fitted with a synthetic buttstock, while the 50.42's buttstock is made from wood.

==== FAL 50.61 (FAL Type 3 PARA) ====
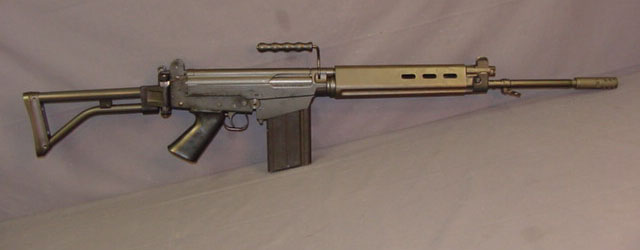
FAL 50.61 variant.

Folding-stock, standard 533 mm (21.0 in) barrel length.

==== FAL 50.62 (FAL Type 3 Para 18) ====
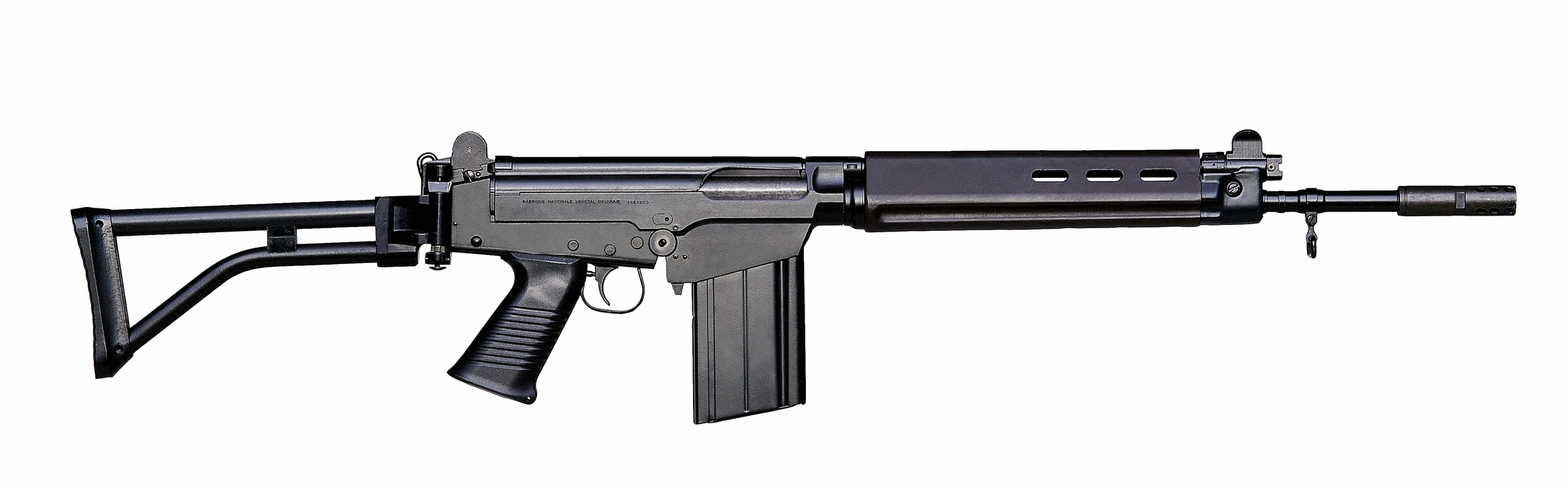
FAL Para

Folding-stock, shorter 457 mm (18 inch) barrel, paratrooper version.

==== FAL 50.63 (FAL Type 2 Para 16) ====
Folding-stock, shorter 440 mm (17.35 inch) barrel, paratrooper version, folding charging handle. This shorter version was requested by Belgian paratroopers. The upper receiver was not cut for a carry handle and the charging handle on the 50.63 was a folding model similar to the L1A1 rifle. The shorter length and folding stock allowed the rifle to fit through the doorway of their C-119 Flying Boxcar when worn horizontally across the chest with the stock folded.

==== FAL 50.64 (FAL Para 3) ====
Folding-stock, standard 533 mm (21.0 in) barrel length, 'Hiduminium' aluminium alloy lower receiver made it lighter than the 50.61, which was heavier than 50.00.

==== Early prototypes ====
- The FN Universal Carbine (1947) was an early FAL prototype chambered for the 7.92×33mm Kurz round. The 7.92mm Kurz round was used as a placeholder for the future mid-range cartridges being developed by Britain and the United States at the time.
- FAL .280 Experimental Automatic Carbine, Long Model (1951): A FAL variant chambered for the experimental .280 British (7×43mm) round. It was designed for a competition at Aberdeen Proving Ground in the US. Although the British bullpup design EM-2 rifle did well, American observers protested that the small-bore .280-caliber round lacked the power and range of a medium-bore .30-caliber round. British observers in return claimed the experimental American .30-caliber T65 round (7.62×51mm) was too powerful to control in automatic fire. Britain was forced to abandon the .280 round and adopt the American-designed .30-caliber T65 as the 7.62×51mm NATO cartridge. The Americans did not yet have a working service rifle of their own in this calibre. Britain and Canada adopted the Belgian 7.62mm FN FAL instead as the L1 Self-Loading Rifle (SLR).
- FAL .280 Experimental Automatic Carbine, Short Model (1951): A bullpup-frame version of the FAL chambered in .280 British designed to compete with the British EM-1 and EM-2 bullpup rifles. It also was demonstrated at the Aberdeen Proving Grounds tests, but was never put into full production.

=== Sturmgewehr 58 ===
Sturmgewehr 58
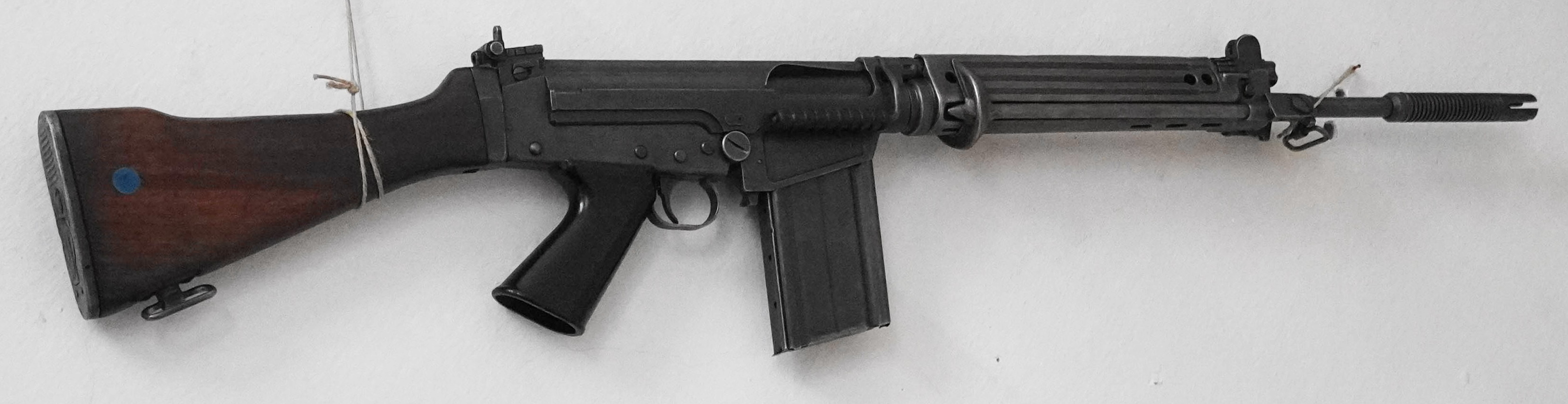
- StG 58 with a wooden stock
- Type: Battle rifle
- Place of origin: Belgium; Austria

Service history
- In service: 1958–1985
- Used by: Austria

Production history
- Designer: Dieudonné Saive
- Designed: 1956
- Manufacturer: Fabrique Nationale de Herstal and Steyr-Daimler-Puch

Specifications
- Mass: 4.45 kg (9.81 lb) to 5.15 kg (11.35 lb)
- Length: 1,100 mm (43 in)
- Barrel length: 533 mm (21.0 in)
- Cartridge: 7.62×51mm NATO
- Action: Gas-operated, tilting breechblock
- Muzzle velocity: 823 m/s (2,700 ft/s)
- Effective firing range: 800 m (870 yd)
- Feed system: 20-round detachable magazine
- Sights: Iron sights

The Sturmgewehr 58 (StG 58) is a selective fire battle rifle. The first 20,000 were manufactured by FN Herstal Belgium, but later the StG 58 was manufactured under licence by Steyr-Daimler-Puch (now Steyr Mannlicher), and was formerly the standard rifle of the Österreichisches Bundesheer (Austrian Federal Army). It is essentially a user-customized version of the FAL and is still in use, mainly as a drill weapon, or for ceremonial purposes in the Gardebataillon (Guard Battalion) of the Austrian forces. It was selected in a 1958 competition, beating the Spanish CETME and American Armalite AR-10.

Most StG 58s featured a folding bipod, and differ from the FAL by using a plastic stock rather than wood in order to reduce weight in the later production rifles (although some of the early FN-built production rifles did come with wooden stocks). The rifle can be distinguished from its Belgian and Argentine counterparts by its combination flash suppressor and grenade launcher. The foregrip was a two-part steel pressing.

Steyr-built StG 58s had a hammer forged barrel. Some StG 58s had modifications made to the fire mode selector so that the fully automatic option was removed, leaving the selector with only safe and semi-automatic positions. The StG 58 was replaced by the Steyr AUG (designated StG 77) in 1977, although the StG 58 served with many units as the primary service rifle through the mid-1980s.

=== Olin-Winchester FAL ===
A semi-automatic, twin-barrel variant chambered in the 5.56mm "Duplex" round during Project SALVO. This weapon was designed by Stefan Kenneth Janson who previously designed the EM-2 rifle.

=== DSA SA58 FAL ===
American firearms company DSA (David Selvaggio Arms) manufactures a copy of the FAL called the DSA SA58 from 1997, made with the same Steyr-Daimler-Puch production line equipment as the StG-58. Their external features make them identical to the FN FAL series.

It comes with a 406 mm (16 in), 457 mm (18 in) or 533 mm (21 in) barrel, an aluminum-alloy lower receiver, and improved Glass-filled Nylon furniture. Civilian clients are limited only to semi-automatic configuration, but military and law enforcement clients can procure select-fire configuration that is capable of firing in full auto with cyclic rate of fire of around 650–750 rounds per minute. The SA58 FAL can use any metric-measurement FAL magazines, which come in 5, 10-, 20-, or 30-round capacities.

The following are made by DSA:

- The SA58 OSW (Operational Specialist Weapon) is an assault-carbine variant of the paratrooper model of the FAL. It has a side-folding Enhanced PARA polymer stock, shorter 279 mm (11 inch) or 330 mm (13 inch) barrel and an optional full-auto setting.
- The SA58 CTC (Compact Tactical Carbine) is a carbine variant. It has a side-folding Enhanced PARA polymer stock, shorter 413 mm (16.25 inch) barrel and an optional full-auto setting. Overall Length: 927 mm (36.5 inches) Weight: 3.74 kg (8.25 lbs).
- The SA58 SPR (Special Purpose Rifle) is a semi-automatic only variant formerly submitted to the U.S. Army SASS rifle trials. It features a 19-inch fluted barrel, 10-round magazine and an upgraded speed trigger.
- The SA58 DMR (Designated Marksman Rifle) is a semi-automatic variant that has a 16.25 inch fluted heavy barrel.
- The SA58 Pistol is a semi-automatic variant that features an 8-inch barrel. Only for the U.S. civilian market.
- The Kommando, a carbine-based version.

Early versions of the DSA FAL included a 4140 billet upper receiver, machined from a 19-pound block of 4140 steel, and a lower receiver milled from a block of 7075 T6 aircraft grade aluminum. The barrels were provided by Badger and were double stress relieved, cryogenically treated, and had an 11 degree target crown. These barrels featured broach cut rifling, were lapped by hand, and made from 4140 carbon steel. Barrel twist was 1:11. Rifles produced during the Federal Assault Weapons Ban from 1994 to 2004 included integrally machined muzzle brakes that served to reduce muzzle rise and recoil. Further more, these muzzle brakes added additional length to barrels to achieve the 16.5 inches that would otherwise have been considered short-barreled rifles under the National Firearms Act. As such, DSA FAL barrels that were effectively ~14 inches, could be legally considered 16.5 inches due to the integral muzzle brakes.

DSA has produced at least one "titanium FAL" with a 16-inch barrel as a concept. Multiple steel parts including the receiver and muzzle device were replaced with titanium ones. Other changes include the dust cover, charging handle, and trigger housing being converted from steel to aluminum. This allowed weight savings of over one kilogram compared to a standard FAL with a 21-inch barrel. A standard 21-inch barrel FAL weighs roughly 4.5 kilograms (9 lbs. 12 oz.) while the titanium DSA prototype with a 16-inch barrel weighs 3.39 kilograms (7 lbs. 7 oz.). It is unlikely to ever be mass-produced due to the cost and difficulty of machining titanium.

=== SC-2010 Hi-Power Modular Weapon System ===
A Peruvian derivative of the FAL designed by the Diseños Casanave Corporation in 2010. Like the FAL, it uses standard 20-round box magazines with the same 7.62×51mm caliber ammo.

== Military adoption ==
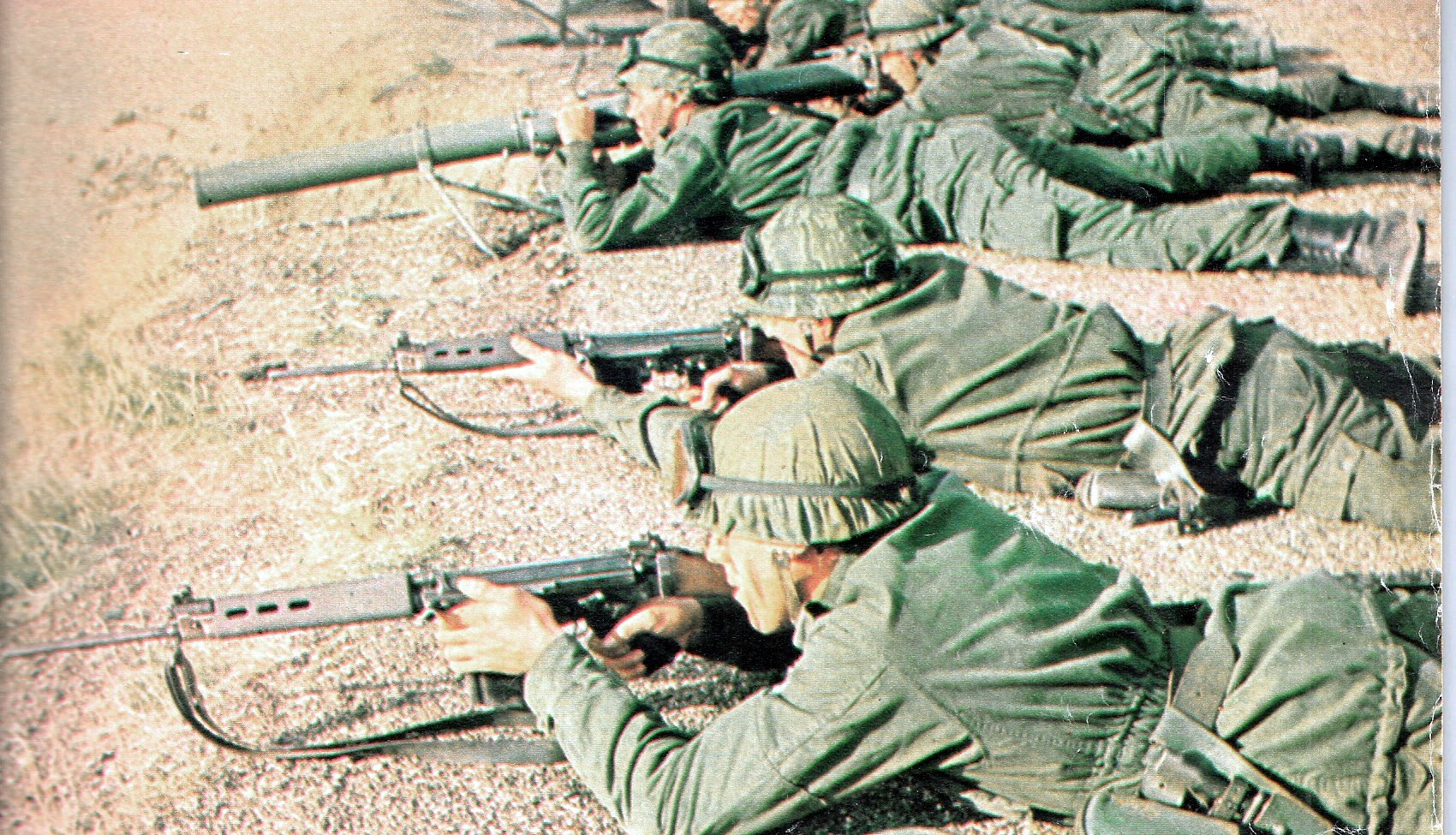
Argentine soldiers armed with FAL during the Falklands War (1982).

The FAL has been used by over 90 countries, and some seven million have been produced. The FAL was originally made by Fabrique Nationale de Herstal (FN) in Liège, Belgium, but it has also been made under license in fifteen countries. As of August 2006, new examples were still being produced by at least four different manufacturers worldwide.

A distinct sub-family was the Commonwealth inch-dimensioned versions that were manufactured in the United Kingdom and Australia (as the L1A1 Self Loading Rifle or SLR), and in Canada as the C1. The standard metric-dimensioned FAL was manufactured in South Africa (where it was known as the R1), Brazil, Israel, Austria and Argentina. Both the SLR and FAL were also produced without license by India.

The Dutch company Armtech built the L1A1 SAS, a carbine variant of the L1A1 with a barrel length of 290 mm (11.4 inches).

=== Argentina ===
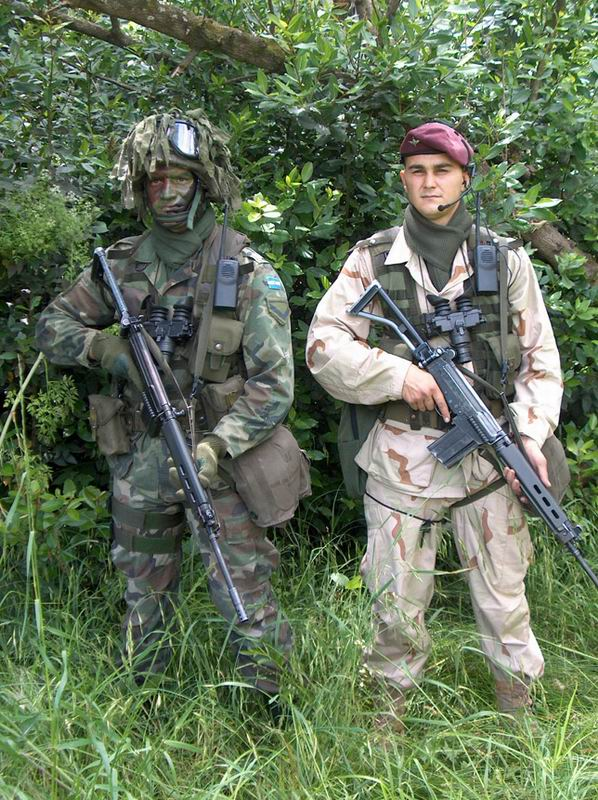
Argentine soldiers with FAL rifles.

Argentine FALs saw action during the Falklands War, and in different peacekeeping operations such as in Cyprus and the former Yugoslavia. Argentine FALs are known to have been exported to Bolivia (in 1971), Colombia, Croatia (during the wars in former Yugoslavia during the 1990s), Honduras, Peru, and Uruguay.

=== Brazil ===
Along with the IA2, MD-2 and MD-3 assault rifles, Brazil produces the M964A1/Pelopes (Special Operations Platoon), with a 16.5" barrel, 3-point sling and a Picatinny rail with a tactical flashlight and sight.

The Brazilian Army officially used the FAP (Fuzil Automático Pesado, or heavy automatic rifle) as its squad automatic weapon until 2013/2014, when the FN Minimi was adopted to replace it. The Marine Corps and Air Force also adopted the Minimi to replace the FAP.

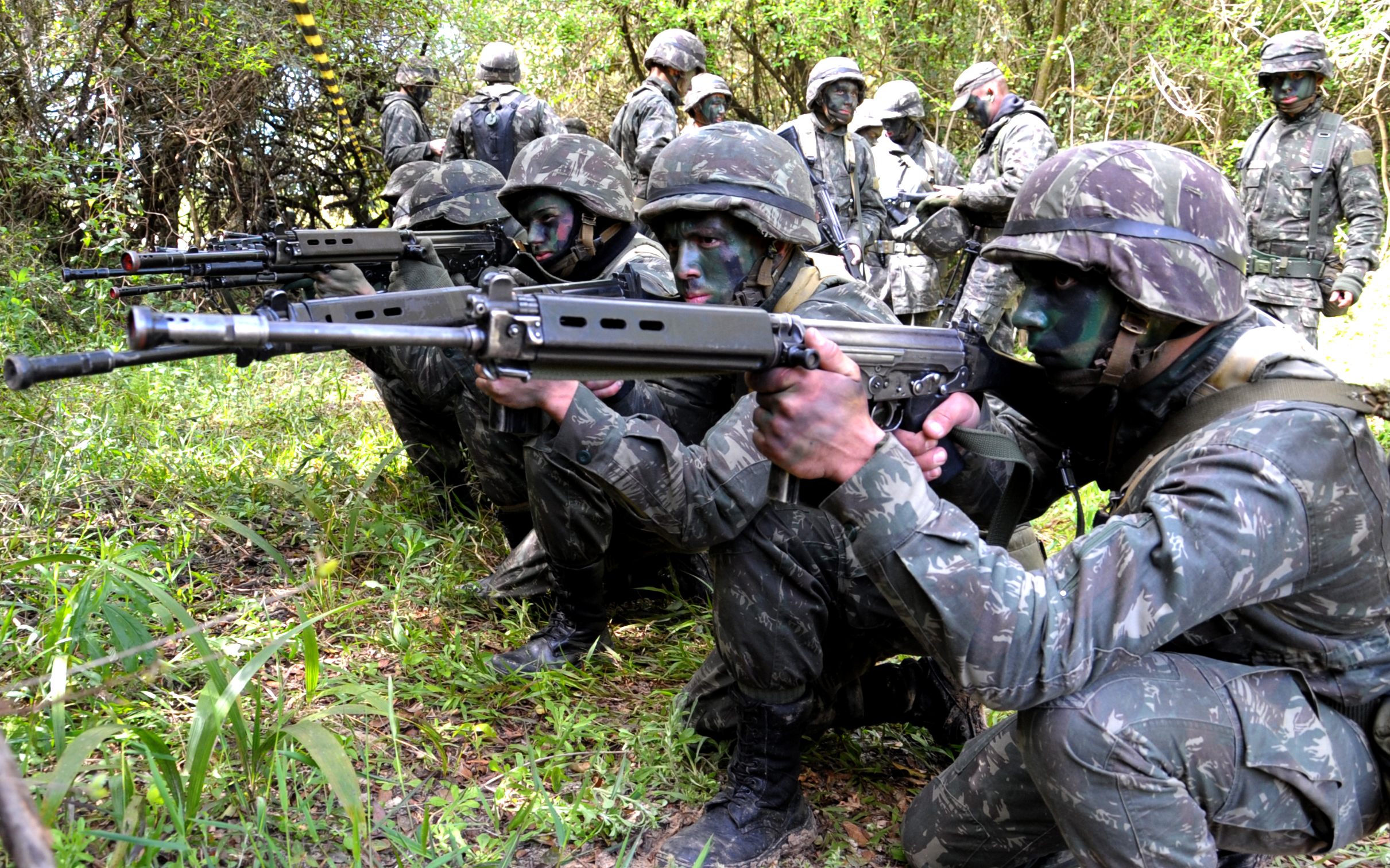
Brazilian Army conscripts using the FAL in Santa Maria, Rio Grande do Sul.

IMBEL also produced a semi-automatic version of the FAL for Springfield Armory, Inc. (not to be confused with the US military Springfield Armory), which was marketed in the US as the SAR-48 (standard model) and SAR-4800 (made after 1989 with some military features removed to comply with new legislation), starting in the mid-1980s. IMBEL-made receivers have been much in demand among American gunsmiths building FALs from "parts kits".

IMBEL in 2014 offered the FAL in 9 versions:

- M964, the standard length semi-auto and full auto.
- M964 MD1, short barrel semi-auto and full auto.
- M964 MD2, standard length semi-auto only.
- M964 MD3, short barrel semi-auto only.
- M964A1, folding stock standard barrel semi-auto and full auto.
- M964A1 MD1, folding stock short barrel semi-auto and full auto.
- M964A1 MD2, folding stock standard barrel semi-auto only.
- M964A1 MD3, folding stock short barrel semi-auto only.
- M964A1/Pelopes, short barrel semi-auto and full auto with Picatinny rail.

=== West Germany ===
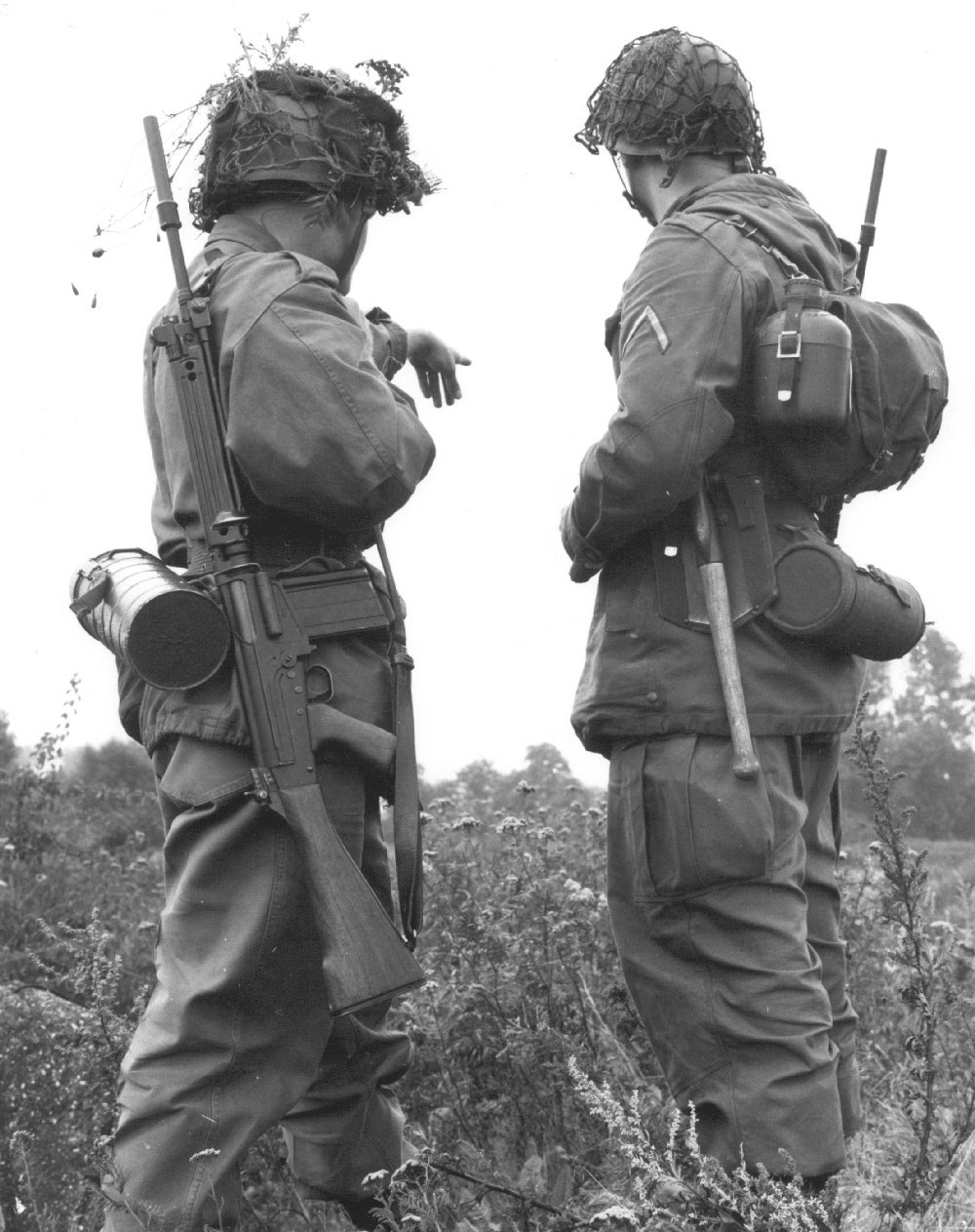
Two West German cadets on a joint exercise in 1960. West Germany used the FN FAL designated as G1.

The first West German FALs were from an order placed in late 1955 or early 1956, for several thousand FN FAL so-called "Canada" models with wood furniture and the prong flash hider. These weapons were intended for the Bundesgrenzschutz (border guard) and not the newly formed Bundeswehr (army), which at the time used M1 Garands and M1/M2 carbines. In November 1956, however, West Germany ordered 100,000 additional FALs, designated the G1, for the army. FN made the rifles between April 1957 and May 1958. The G1 user modifications included light metal handguards and an integral folding bipod, similarly to the Austrian version. Neither Germany nor Austria adopted the heavy-barreled FAL, instead using the MG3 (the modernized MG42 in 7.62×51mm NATO) as its general purpose machine gun (GPMG).

The West Germans were satisfied with the FAL and wished to produce it under license. The Belgians, however, refused. Being subject to two German occupations in the space of two generations (1914–1918 and 1940–1945), the Belgians insisted on the West Germans purchasing only FN-made FALs. Under the German occupation during World War II, FN was taken over by the major German arms manufacturer Deutsche Waffen- und Munitionsfabriken (DWM), its directors arrested, and the assembly lines run by slave labor after only 10% of the Belgian factory workers showed up when ordered to do so.

Based on political and economical considerations, but also national pride, the Germans aimed at a weapon they could produce domestically and turned their sights to the Spanish CETME Modelo 58 rifle. Working with the West Germans, the Spanish adopted the 7.62×51mm NATO cartridge, and a slightly modified version of the CETME went on to be manufactured in West Germany by Heckler & Koch (H&K) as the G3 rifle, beginning production in 1959. The G3 would become the second most popular battle rifle in the Free World, "used by some 50 nations and license-manufactured in a dozen". Without the G3, the FAL may have completely dominated the militaries of the West during the Cold War.

The G1 featured a pressed metal handguard identical to the ones used on the Austrian Stg. 58, as well as the Dutch and Greek FALs, this being slightly slimmer than the standard wood or plastic handguards, and featuring horizontal lines running almost their entire length. G1s were also fitted with a unique removable prong flash hider, adding another external distinction. Of note is the fact that the G1 was the first FAL variant with the 3 mm lower sights specifically requested by West Germany, previous versions having the taller Commonwealth-type sights also seen on Israeli models. The West German FAL had access to high quality Hensoldt Optische Werk F-series scopes with Zeiss-equivalent optics; having 4x magnification, with a 24 millimetres (0.94 in) objective lens.

The majority of the West German G1 rifles were sold as surplus to the Turkish Army in the mid-1960s, and some G1s found their way to Rhodesia and Portugal.

=== Israel ===
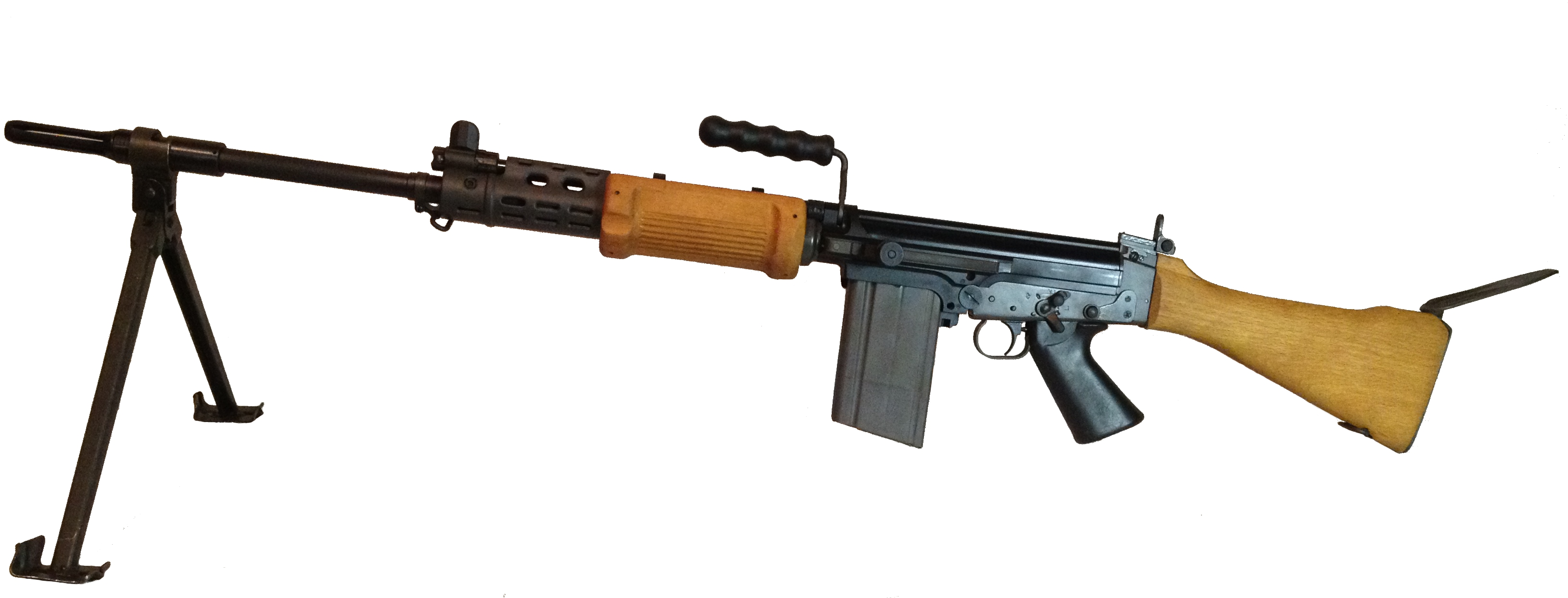
Israeli Heavy Barrel FAL. Note the hinged butt plate.

After the 1948 Arab–Israeli War, the Israeli Defense Forces (IDF) had to overcome several logistics problems which were a result of the wide variety of old firearms that were in service, such as the German Mauser Kar 98k and some British Lee–Enfield rifles. In 1955 the IDF adopted the IMI-produced Uzi submachine gun and the FN FAL in order to standardize their infantry armament; with the FAL being designated Rov've Mitta'enn or Romat (רומ"ט), abbreviation of "Self-Loading Rifle". IMI licensed the FAL in 1955.

The FAL version ordered by the IDF came in two basic variants, both regular and heavy-barrel (squad automatic rifle/ light machine gun), and were chambered in 7.62mm NATO. The Israeli heavy barrel FAL (or FALO) was designated the Makle'a Kal, or Makleon, having a standard handguard improved with a perforated metal sleeve around the heavy barrel, and a wooden handguard with a heat shield. The folding bipod being directly attached to the barrel. The Israeli Makleon was fed by a 20-round magazine.

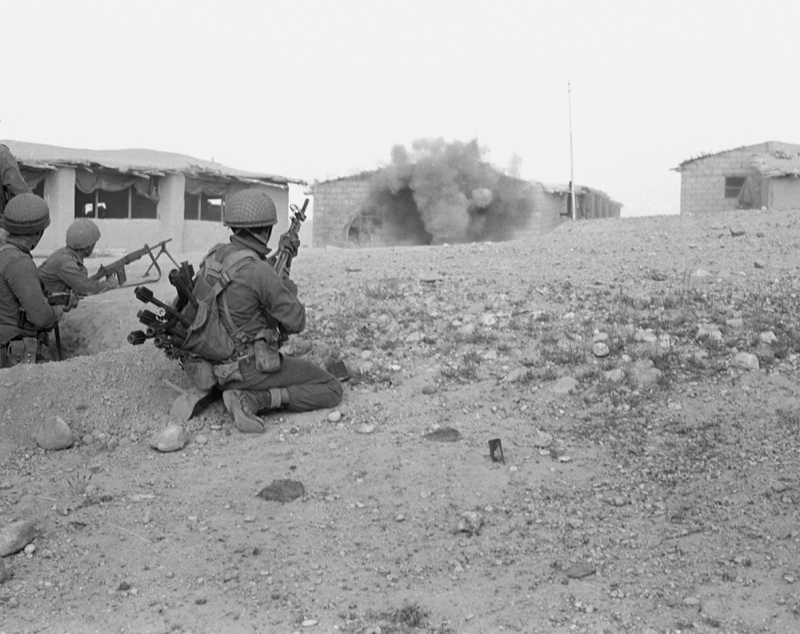
Paratroopers fighting on the outskirts of the town of Karameh during Operation Inferno, 21 March 1968. A paratrooper with a Makleon is in position while a rifle-grenadier is to his right.

Analysing the Israeli campaign of 1956 in the Sinai, during the Suez Crisis, Brigadier General SLA Marshall noted of the Makleon:

By Israeli training practice, when the light machine guns are used as fire base to cover the forward movement of the rest of the section, they should not operate at more than two hundred yards' [183m] maximum range from the target. To cut that distance by half is considered better. In the attack, LMGs are rated as highly expendable items and are shoved far front. When the section rushes the enemy position under cover of the LMG fire, one rifleman stays behind to protect the gunners.

Marshall also notes the advantage of both rifle and LMG ammunition being interchangeable, with the squad carrying sixty 20-round magazines, with 1,200 rounds in total.

The Israeli FALs were originally produced as selective-fire rifles, though later light-barrel rifle versions were altered to semi-automatic fire only. The first rifles were Belgian-made, with Israel later licence-producing the weapons and its magazines. The Israeli models are recognizable by a distinctive handguard with a forward perforated sheet metal section. Israeli-made magazines were made in the same FN standard of steel, finished with durable black enamel paint, and bearing two Hebrew characters stamped into the metal on one side.

The IDF always emphasized the use of rifle grenades, integrating its usage into their doctrine of night assaults. Approaching enemy positions within rifle-grenade range, initiating the assault with a volley of grenades onto the enemy positions intended to stun and suppress the defenders, while being immediately followed by the infantry assault while the enemy was shaken.

Israel's infantry prefers the rifle-fired antitank grenade to the bazooka for shock effect on a group or bunker. At night, if the section should run into an ambush, the grenadier fires, and all the others rush straight in, not firing.

IDF Paratroopers with FN FAL rifles during a training march, 5 June 1965.

Initially, Israel manufactured a copy of the Energa rifle grenade, that would be surpassed by more recent designs still in production. Of particular note is the BT/AT 52, an IMI version of the BT rifle grenade derived from the earlier MA/AT 52 model. It can be fired both from 5.56mm and 7.62mm weapons, which share the same-diameter muzzle device, with a maximum range of 300 m (328yd) from 7.62mm guns. The BT/AT 52 is often seen in photographs with the FAL.

The Israeli FAL first saw action in relatively small quantities during the Suez Crisis of 1956, being the standard-issue rifle in the Six-Day War in June 1967, the War of Attrition of 1967–1970. During the Yom Kippur War of October 1973, the FAL was still in front-line service as the standard Israeli rifle, though increasing criticism eventually led to the phasing-out of the weapon. Israeli forces were primarily mechanized in nature; the long, heavy FAL slowed deployment drills, and proved exceedingly difficult to maneuver within the confines of a vehicle. Additionally, Israeli forces experienced occasional jamming of the FAL due to heavy sand and dust ingress endemic to Middle Eastern desert warfare.

With the soldiers traveling in open-topped halftracks in fast-paced operations, with tank tracks filling the air with clouds of dust filled with fine grit, soldiers would jump from the half-tracks to hit the sand, finding the rifles filthy at the moment of contact. In such lightning-fast mobile warfare, the men would hardly have time to eat, sleep or clean their rifles. Though the IDF evaluated a few modified FAL rifles with 'sand clearance' slots in the bolt carrier and receiver (which were already part of the Commonwealth L1A1/C1A1 design), malfunction rates did not significantly improve. The Israeli FAL was eventually replaced from 1972 onwards by the M16 and in 1974 by the Galil. The FAL remained in production in Israel into the 1980s.

=== Portugal ===
During the colonial war in Angola, Guinea and Mozambique (the Ultramar War), the FAL was used by the Portuguese alongside the HK G3 and the AR10. In Portuguese service, the FN FAL was designated Espingarda Automática 7,62 mm FN m/962. Those were Belgian-made FN FAL and German G1 rifles, and they became favoured by special forces units such as the Caçadores Especiais ("Special Hunters/Rangers").

=== Rhodesia ===
Like most British dependencies in the postwar era, Southern Rhodesia adopted the Commonwealth pattern L1A1 SLR by the early 1960s. Southern Rhodesia contributed small military contingents to aid British counter-insurgency operations during the Malayan Emergency and the Aden Emergency, and adopted the L1A1 as its standard infantry rifle around that time. As a result of its participation in those conflicts, the Rhodesian Security Forces inherited the British emphasis on long-range marksmanship and the use of riflemen in small units as the primary cornerstone of major counter-insurgency campaigns. The standard small unit of the security forces, which included the Southern Rhodesian Army as well as various paramilitary police and internal security divisions, was the stick; this consisted of four riflemen, each armed with SLRs, and a machine gunner carrying an FN MAG. The United Kingdom continued to export L1A1s to Southern Rhodesia until that country issued a unilateral declaration of independence as Rhodesia in 1965. Rhodesia subsequently became subject to a British arms embargo and the SLRs were largely relegated to reserve army and police units.

During the Rhodesian Bush War, the Rhodesian Security Forces turned to a sympathetic South Africa as a major supplier of arms. South Africa already manufactured a metric-pattern FAL under licence as the R1, and transferred a number of these rifles to Rhodesia. Rhodesia also acquired FAL variants illicitly on the international black market, including original FN rifles from Belgium and G1s from West Germany. Many of the FAL derivatives in Rhodesian service were fitted with custom muzzle brakes to reduce recoil on fully automatic fire.

The heavy Rhodesian emphasis on individual marksmanship and the ballistic qualities of the 7.62×51mm round often allowed outnumbered Rhodesian patrols to fight their way through larger groups of insurgents from the Zimbabwe African National Liberation Army (ZANLA) or Zimbabwe People's Revolutionary Army (ZIPRA), both of which were equipped primarily with Kalashnikov-pattern automatic rifles such as the AK-47 and AKM. Rhodesian troops were trained to fire directly into the insurgents' cover whenever an ambush was encountered, shooting their FALs in bursts that were deliberately aimed low and graduating their fire upwards. Their 7.62×51mm ammunition could penetrate thick bush and tree trunks more readily than the 7.62×39mm cartridge used in the AK-47, and was more successful at killing the enemy combatants in cover.

Following general elections in 1980 which brought the former insurgent leadership to power, the country finally achieved internationally recognised independence as Zimbabwe, and the Rhodesian Security Forces were amalgamated with ZANLA and ZIPRA. As the Zimbabwean government had inherited vast stockpiles of 7.62×51mm ammunition from the Rhodesian era, it initially ordered the insurgents' small arms to be placed into reserve storage and confirmed the FAL as the standard service rifle of the new Zimbabwe Defence Forces (ZDF). However, a successful sabotage action carried out against the preexisting stockpiles of 7.62×51mm ammunition, possibly by disgruntled Rhodesian service members or South African special forces, negated this factor. The ZDF responded by bringing the insurgent weapons out of storage to complement the FAL, and gradually phased out the weapon type in favour of Kalashnikov rifles to simplify maintenance and logistics.

=== South Africa ===
The FAL was produced under licence in South Africa by Lyttleton Engineering Works, where it is known as the R1. After a competition between the German G3 rifle, the Armalite AR-10, and the FN FAL, the South African Defence Force adopted three main variants of the FAL: a rifle with the designation R1, a "lightweight" variant of the FN FAL 50.64 with folding butt, fabricated locally under the designation R2, and a model designed for police use not capable of automatic fire under the designation R3. 200,000 were destroyed in UN-sponsored "Operation Mouflon" in 2001.

A number of other variants of the R1 were built, the R1 HB, which had a heavy barrel and bipod, the R1 Sniper, which could be fitted with a scope and the R1 Para Carbine, which used a Single Point IR sight and had a shorter barrel. R1 was standard issue in the SADF until the introduction of the R4 in the early 1980s. Still used by the SANDF as a designated marksman rifle. The first South African-produced rifle, serial numbered 200001, was presented to the then Prime Minister, Hendrik Verwoerd, by Armscor and is now on view at the South African National Museum of Military History in Johannesburg.

=== Syria ===
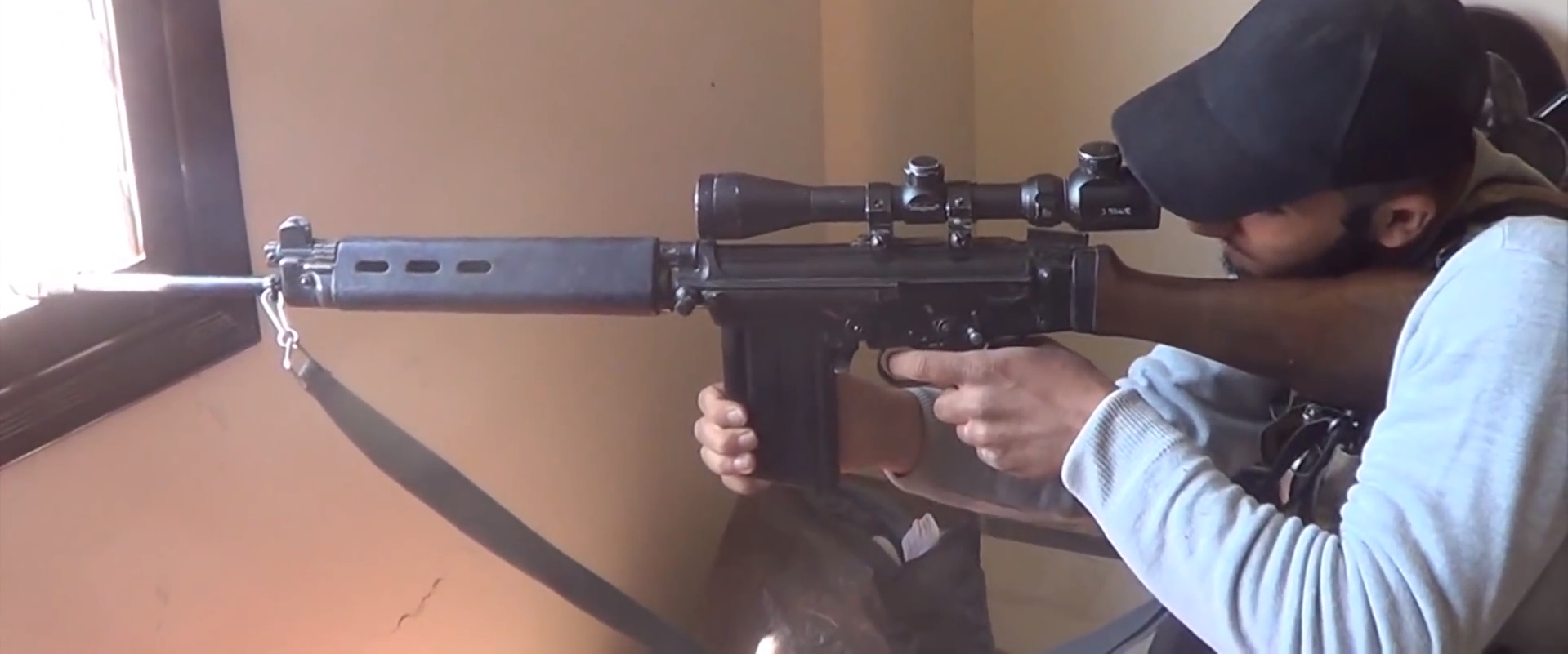
A fighter of the Siddiq Battalions fires a scoped FN FAL at Syrian Armed Forces in the town of Otaybah, eastern Ghouta, 2013.

Syria adopted the FN FAL in 1956. 12,000 rifles were bought in 1957. The Syrian state produced 7.62×51mm cartridges and is reported to have acquired FALs from other sources. During the Syrian Civil War, FALs from various sources, including Israel, were used by governmental forces, rebels, Islamic State of Iraq and the Levant (ISIL) and Kurdish forces. The Syrian Arab Army and loyalist paramilitary forces used it as a designated marksman rifle. At the end of 2012, the use of .308 Winchester cartridges may have caused these FALs to malfunction, thus reducing the popularity of the weapon.

=== United States ===
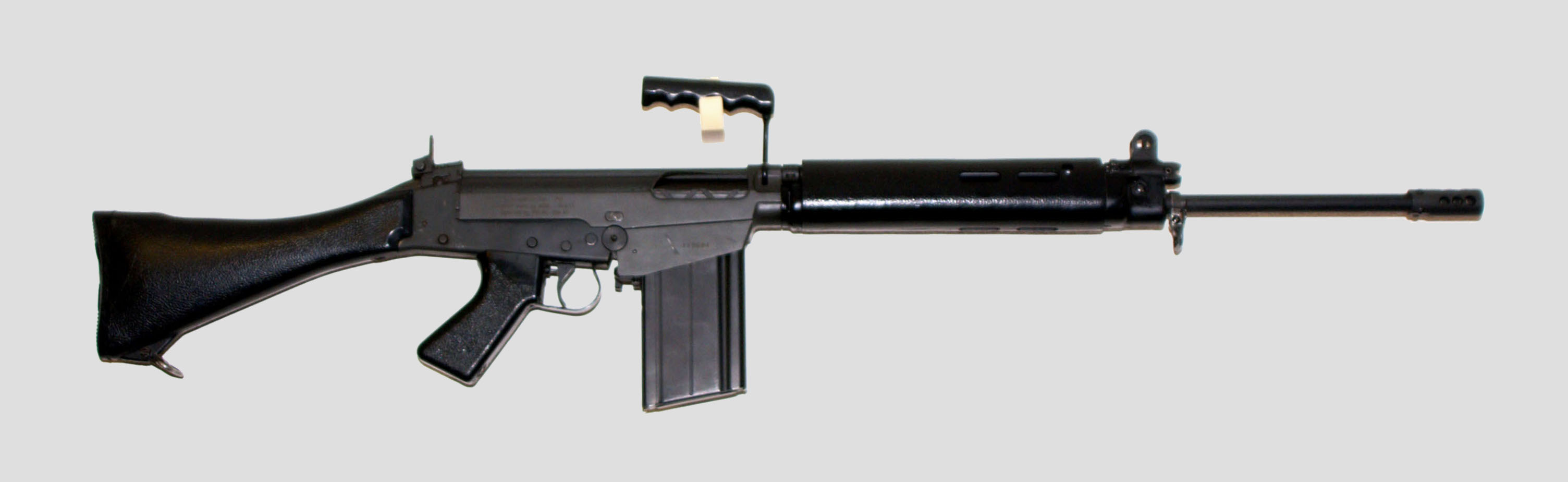
Century Arms FAL rifle built from an L1A1 parts kit.

Following World War II and the establishment of the NATO alliance, there was pressure to adopt a standard rifle, alliance-wide. The FAL was originally designed to handle intermediate cartridges, but in an attempt to secure US favor for the rifle, the FAL was redesigned to use the newly developed 7.62×51mm NATO cartridge. The US tested several variants of the FAL to replace the M1 Garand. These rifles were tested against the T44, essentially an updated version of the basic Garand design. Despite the T44 and T48 performing similarly in trials, the T44 was, for several reasons, selected and the US formally adopted the T44 as the M14 service rifle.

During the late 1980s and 1990s, many countries decommissioned the FAL from their armories and sold them en masse to United States importers as surplus. The rifles were imported to the United States as fully automatic guns. Once in the U.S., the FALs were "de-militarized" (upper receiver destroyed) to eliminate the rifles' character as an automatic rifle, as stipulated by the Gun Control Act of 1968. GCA 68 currently prohibits the importation of foreign-made full-automatic rifles prior to the enactment of the Gun Control Act. Semiautomatic versions of the same firearm were legal to import until the Semiautomatic Assault Rifle Ban of 1989.

Thousands of the resulting "parts kits" were sold at generally low prices ($90 – $250) to hobbyists. The hobbyists rebuilt the parts kits into legal and functional semi-automatic rifles using new semi-automatic upper receivers. New FAL rifles are still commercially available from DSArms in semi-auto configuration. Rifles built from kits were formerly made and sold by Entreprise Arms (out of business), and Century International Arms (no longer produced). The Century Arms version was a semi-automatic L1A1 with an IMBEL upper receiver and surplus British Enfield inch-pattern parts, while DSArms used Steyr-style metric-pattern FAL designs. This standard-metric difference means the Century Arms and DSArms firearms parts are not fully interchangeable.

=== Venezuela ===
Venezuela placed an order for 5,000 FN-made FAL rifles in 1954, in the 7×49.15mm Optimum 2 caliber. This 7×49mm, also known as 7 mm Liviano or 7 mm Venezuelan, is essentially a 7×57mm round shortened to intermediate length and closer to being a true intermediate round than the 7.62×51mm NATO. This unusual caliber was jointly developed by Venezuelan and Belgian engineers motivated by a global move towards intermediate calibers. The Venezuelans, who had been exclusively using the 7×57mm round in their light and medium weapons since the turn of the 20th century, felt it was a perfect platform on which to base a calibre tailored to the particular rigours of the Venezuelan terrain. Eventually the plan was dropped despite having ordered millions of rounds and thousands of weapons on this caliber. As the Cold War escalated, the military command felt it necessary to align with NATO on geopolitical grounds despite not being a member, resulting in the adoption of the 7.62×51mm NATO cartridge. The 5,000 rifles of the first batch were rebarrelled to 7.62×51mm.

When marching victoriously into Havana in 1959, Fidel Castro was carrying an FN-made Venezuelan FAL in 7 mm Liviano.

Until recently, the FAL was the main service rifle of the Venezuelan army, made under license by CAVIM. Venezuela has bought 100,000 AK-103 assault rifles from Russia in order to replace the old FALs. Although the full shipment arrived by the end of 2006, the FAL will remain in service with the Venezuelan Reserve Forces and the Territorial Guard.

== Users ==
Map of current and former operators of the FAL. Current operators Former operators

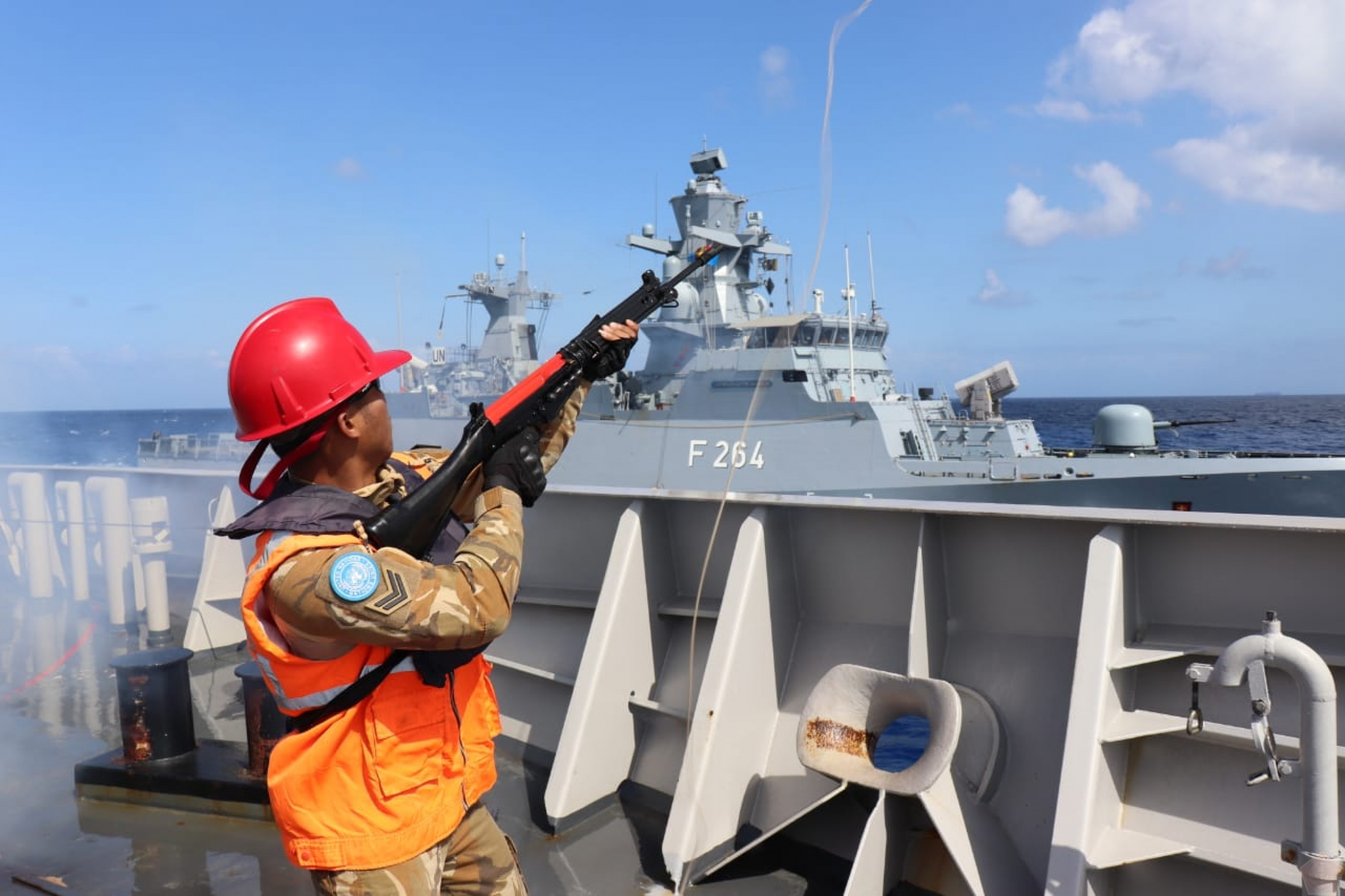
An Indonesian Navy sailor firing shot line from the KRI Sultan Hasanuddin (366), which was part of the UNIFIL Maritime Task Force, to FGS Ludwigshafen am Rhein (F264) in Mediterranean Sea, May 2020

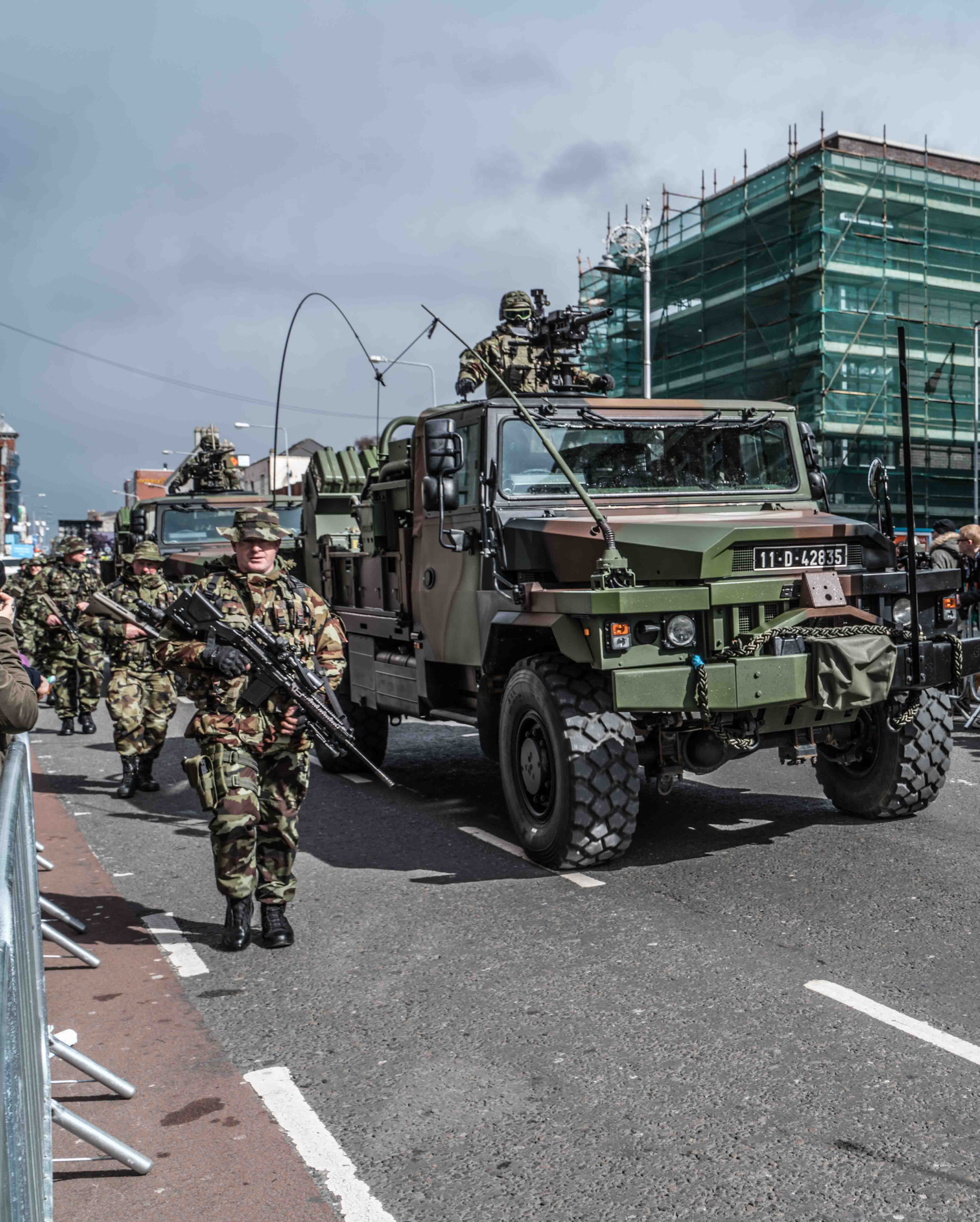
An Irish soldier armed with a heavily modified FAL, used as a sniper support weapon.

=== Current users ===
- Angola
- Argentina: Produced under license. It is the regular rifle of the Argentine Armed Forces, and is used by the Army and Air Force, and as a secondary rifle in the Navy. The FAL M5 modernized variant was intended to be widely fielded, though the project stalled; some of the delivered units are in use. The modernization program was restarted and three new variants were designed, all based on components manufactured by American gunmaker DSArms. These are the FAMA (Fusil Argentino Modelo Asalto), a compact version intended mainly for paratrooper use; the FAMCa (Fusil Argentino Modelo Carabina), intended for general use; and the FAMTD (Fusil Argentino Modelo Tirador Destacado), intended for marksmen, and available in a light or heavy barrel configuration. Reportedly, only the FAMCa has seen significant adoption, mainly in special forces units and quick reaction forces, though sources claim delivery of rifles has stopped.
- Australia: Used as the ceremonial drill weapon by Australia's Federation Guard.
- Bahrain
- Bangladesh: Withdrawn from service. In reserve.
- Barbados
- Belize
- Bolivia
- Brazil: Produced under license between 1959 and 1984. Now being replaced by IMBEL IA2.
- Burundi
- Cambodia
- Cameroon
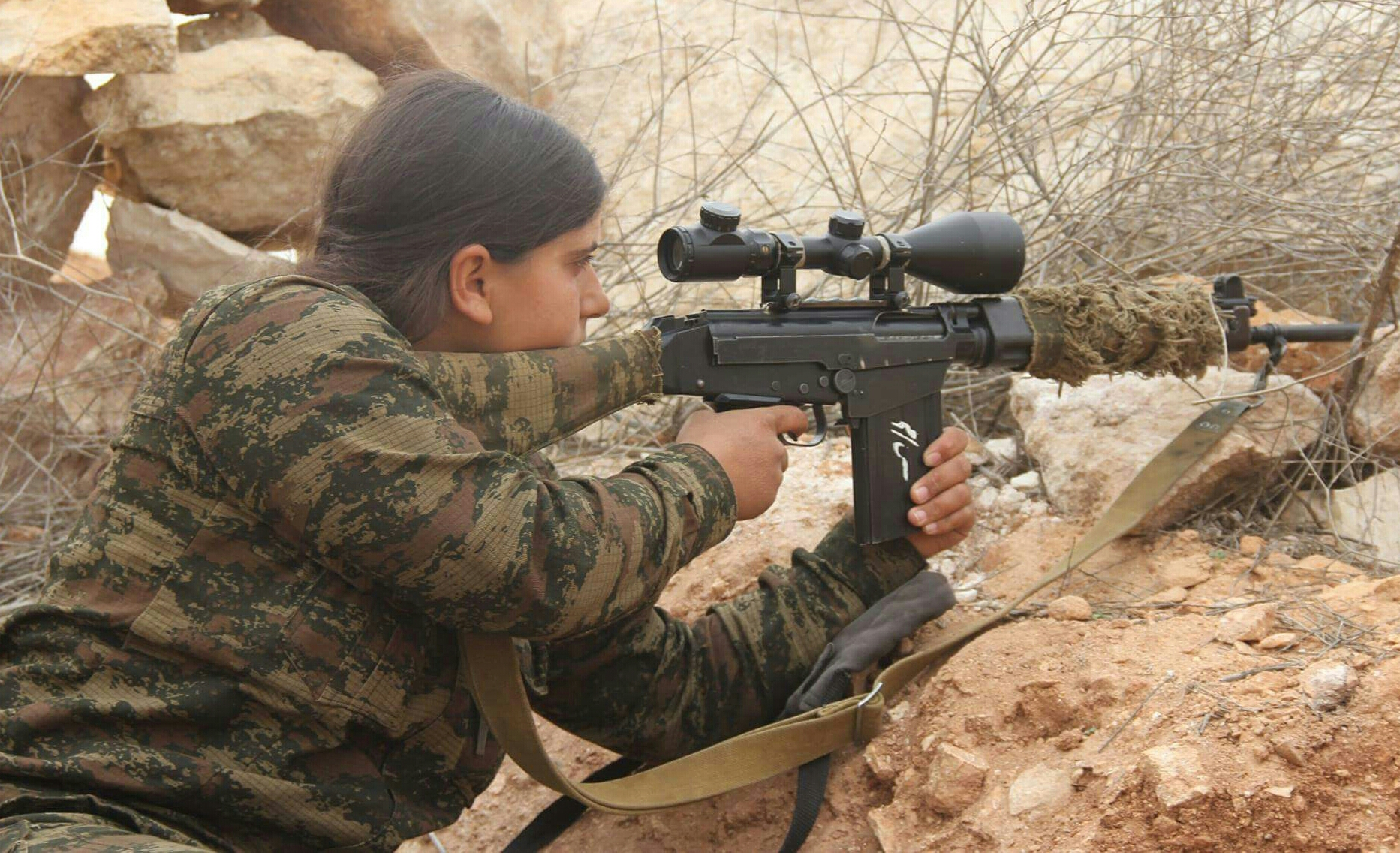
  A Kurdish YPG fighter with scoped FAL, 2016.
  Central African Republic
- Chad
- Colombia
- Congo-Brazzaville
- Congo-Kinshasa
- Costa Rica
- Cyprus
- Djibouti
- Dominican Republic
- Ecuador
- Egypt: FN FALs were used by Unit 777 during the raid on Larnaca International Airport
- Eswatini
- Gambia
- Ghana
- Guyana
- Honduras
- Indonesia: Used by KKO, now used aboard naval vessels for line throwers.
- Iraq: Iraqi insurgents
- Ireland: Used as the service rifle of the Irish Defence Forces from 1961 until 1989 when it was replaced by the Steyr AUG. However, it remained in use with the Irish reserve forces until the early 2000s. In 2011, the Irish Army re-introduced an upgraded and modified version of the FN FAL as a sniper support weapon. The Irish Naval Service still use the FN FAL for line throwing. In January 2021, the Irish Defence Forces stated they were looking for a replacement sniper support weapon.
- Israel: FN-made and locally made under license by Israel Military Industries in FAL and FALO versions. Known locally as the Romat.
- Ivory Coast
- Jamaica
- Kenya
- Kuwait
- Lesotho
- Liberia
- Libya
- Malaysia
- Malta
- Mexico: Produced under license.
- Morocco
- Mozambique
- Myanmar: Used surplus ex-German G1s
- Nepal
- Nigeria: Licensed by DICON (Defence Industries Corporation of Nigeria) in Nigeria as the NR-1.
- Niger
- Oman
- Palestine: Used by Unit 101 of the West Bank authority as a sniper rifle platform.
- Panama
- Papua New Guinea
- Paraguay
- Peru
- Philippines: A few units of FALs were used by the AFP and Police during the 1970s, went into the hands of the MNLF rebels as seen during the 2013 siege of Zamboanga City.
- Qatar
- Rwanda
- Saint Vincent and the Grenadines
- Saudi Arabia
- Somalia
- Suriname
- (Syrian opposition) Syria
- Tanzania
- Thailand: Used by Royal Thai Police since the 1960s, designated "Rifle Type 05" (1962).
- Togo
- Trinidad and Tobago
- Tunisia: Used by Tunisian National Guard.
- Uganda
- United Arab Emirates
- Ukraine: An unknown quantity, seen in the hands of Ukrainian forces during the Russian invasion of Ukraine.
- Uruguay
- Venezuela: Produced under license.
- Yemen
- Zambia
- Zimbabwe

==== Non-state users ====
- Democratic Forces for the Liberation of Rwanda
- Front de libération du Québec: Stolen from Canadian armories.
- Free Syrian Army
- Islamic State
  - Maute Group
- Moro Islamic Liberation Front
- contra rebels
- Lord's Resistance Army
- People's Defense Units: Captured from the Islamic State
- Provisional Irish Republican Army: Used stolen Irish Army FALs and British L1A1 rifles, a number were seized during a raid on the apartment of IRA members in Amsterdam.
- Rapid Support Forces
- Vanguarda Armada Revolucionaria Palmares
- ex-Libyan FALs can be traced to Algeria, Chad, Egypt, Lebanon, Niger, Syria and Tunisia
- Comando Vermelho: 14 Apprehended during Operation Containment

=== Former users ===
- Australia: Adopted the L1A1 in 1959 as the in-service rifle and the L2A2 with a heavy barrel as a Light Automatic Support Weapon by the Australian Defence Force. Withdrawn from service following the introduction of the Steyr AUG F88.
- Austria: Produced under license. StG 58 variants were used by the Austrian Armed Forces from 1958 until 1977. Replaced by Steyr AUG (STG 77).
- Belgium: Used by the Belgian Army from 1956 until 1995. Replaced by FN FNC.
- Botswana: Being replaced as of 2017 with the SAR 21.
- Canada: The FN FAL was the first semi-automatic rifle adopted by the Canadian Army, seeing service as the FN C1A1 (“C1”) and FN C2A1 (“C2”) (a heavy barrel, selectable semi-/fully- automatic variant with folding, bi-pod forestock), between 1955 and 1990. Canada was the first NATO country to adopt the FN FAL. The C1 and C2 were manufactured in Canada under licence from Fabrique Nationale by Canadian Arsenals Limited (Toronto, Ont.). Between 80,000 and 90,000 were produced, of which 72,470 were contracted to the Canadian Department of National Defence.
- Chile
- Croatia: 70,000 FAL and FALO rifles supplied by Argentina during the Croatian War of Independence, often called "Falovka". Unknown number used by the Croatian Defence Council (HVO) and special police of Herzeg-Bosnia during the Bosnian war.
- Cuba: Used during the Bay of Pigs Invasion.
- Federal Republic of Yugoslavia: Used in unknown quantities by Special Operations Unit (Serbia).
- Israel: Produced under license as the 'lightened' ROMAT M1953. Used by the Israeli Army from 1955 until 1972. Officially replaced by IMI Galil and M16.
- Katanga
- Lebanon: Adopted in 1956 as the standard rifle of the Lebanese army
- Luxembourg: Used Belgian FALs from 1957 to 1996, replaced by Steyr AUG.
- Netherlands: The Royal Netherlands Army adopted the rifle with a bipod and in semi-automatic form, in 1961. In service it was called Het licht automatisch geweer, but usually known as the 'FAL'. The rifles had unique sights (hooded at the front) and the German style sheet metal front handguard. A sniper version, Geweer Lange Afstand, was also used standard with a scope of Dutch origin produced by the Artillerie Inrichtingen, and without the bipod. The scope was designated Kijker Richt Recht AI 62. The heavy-barrel FAL 50.42 version was also adopted later as a squad automatic weapon as the Het zwaar automatisch geweer.
- Pakistan: were used by the Pakistan Army in small numbers, used during the Cold War.
- Portugal: In 1960, the Army issued quantities of light-barrel FN and West German G1 FAL rifles to several of its elite commando forces, including the Companhias de Caçadores Especiais (Special Hunter [Ranger] companies). The latter often expressed a preference for the lighter FAL over the Portuguese-manufactured version of the Heckler & Koch G3 rifle when on ambush or patrol.
- Rhodesia: Bought as surplus from Germany and South Africa, because of trade embargo in the country in the 1960s and 1970s.
- South Africa: Kept in reserve
- Turkey: Used by Turkish Land Forces as G1 between 1960s – 1980s.
- United Kingdom: Used some Belgian-made FN FALs.
- West Germany: Used initially by the Border Guard as the G1. Also by German Army from 1956 until the early 1960s. Replaced by the Heckler & Koch G3.

== Conflicts ==
In the more than 70 years of use worldwide, the FAL has seen use in conflicts all over the world. During the Falklands War, the FN FAL was used by both sides. The FAL was used by the Argentine armed forces and the L1A1 Self Loading Rifle (SLR), a semi-automatic only version of the FAL, was used by the armed forces of the UK and other Commonwealth nations.

=== 1950s ===
- Mau Mau rebellion (1952–1960) British FN-made prototypes
- Cuban Revolution (1953–1959)
- Calderonista invasion of Costa Rica (1955)
- First Sudanese Civil War (1955–1972)
- Vietnam War (1955–1975)
- Basque conflict (1959–2011)

=== 1960s ===
- Congo Crisis (1960–1965)
- Guatemalan Civil War (1960–1996)
- Portuguese Colonial War (1961–1974)
- Aden Emergency (1963–1967)
- Rhodesian Bush War (1964–1979)
- Eritrean War of Independence (1961–1991)
- Bay of Pigs Invasion (1961)
- FLQ insurgency (1962–1972)
- Colombian conflict (1964–present)
- Second Indo-Pakistani War (1965)
- Communist insurgency in Thailand (1965–1983)
- Communist insurgency in Malaysia (1968–1989)
- Araguaia Guerrilla War (1966–1975)
- South African Border War (1966–1990)
- Six-Day War (1967)
- War of Attrition (1967–1970)
- Nigerian Civil War (1967–1970)
- Moro conflict (1969–2019)
- The Troubles (late 1960s–1998)

=== 1970s ===
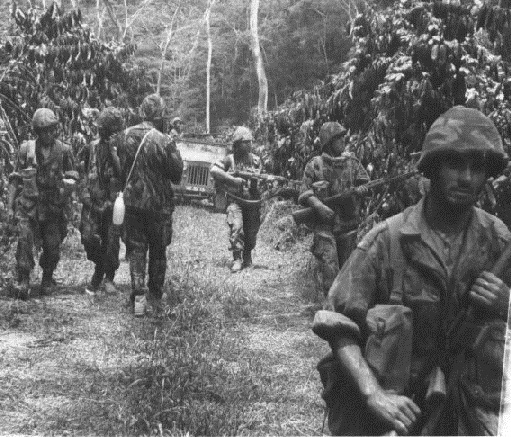
FAL-armed Portuguese soldiers in Angola.

- Bangladesh Liberation War (1971)
  - Indo-Pakistani War of 1971
- Yom Kippur War (1973)
- Cyprus Peace Operation (Invasion of Cyprus) (1974)
- Ethiopian Civil War (1974–1991)
- Operation Independence (1975–1977)
- Lebanese Civil War (1975–1990)
- Western Sahara War (1975–1991)
- Angolan Civil War (1975–2002)
- Egyptian–Libyan War (1977)
- Shaba II (1978)
- Uganda–Tanzania War (1978–1979)
- Nicaraguan Revolution (1978–1990)
- Salvadoran Civil War (1979–1992)

=== 1980s ===
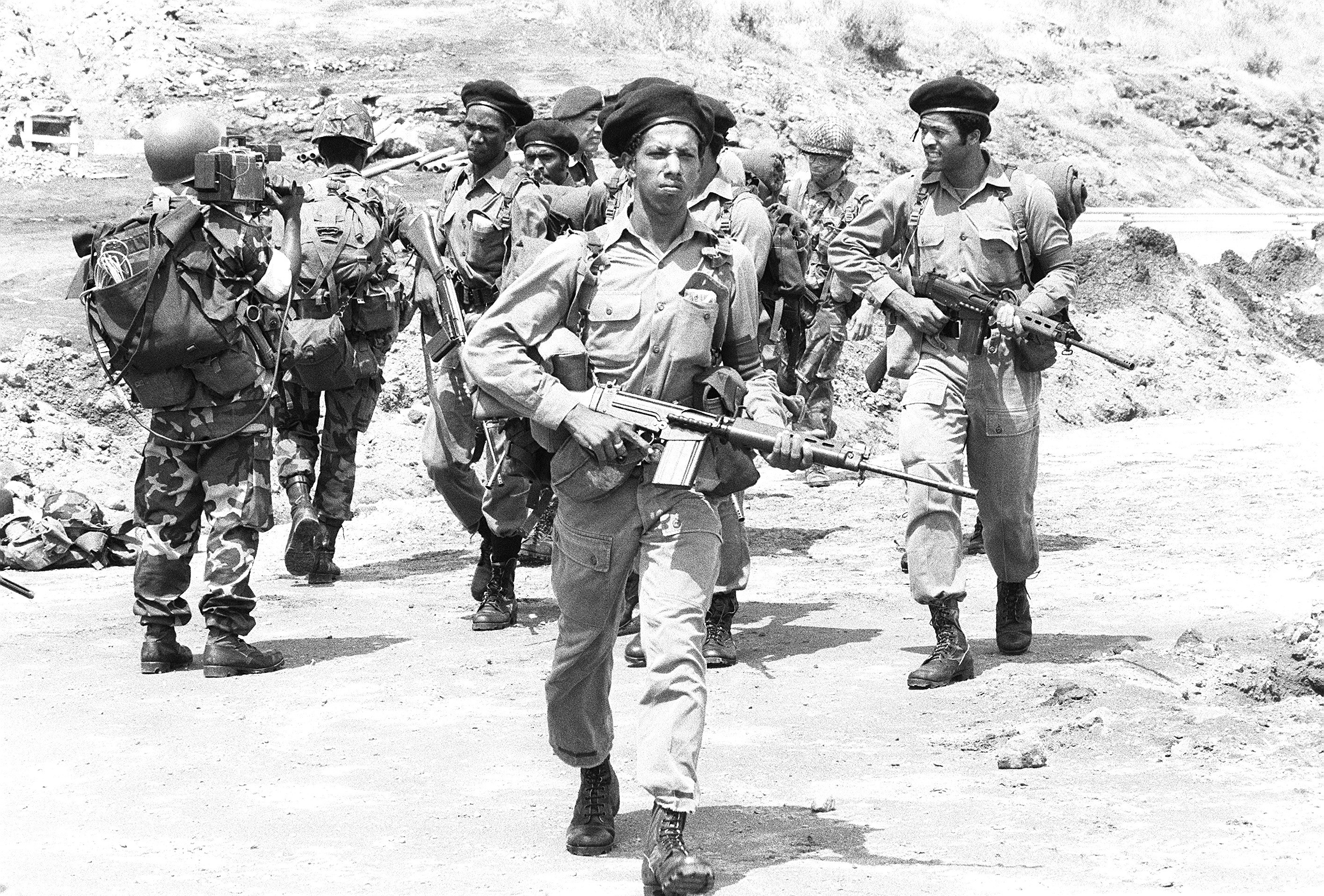
Members of the Eastern Caribbean Defense Force in Operation Urgent Fury are armed with FN FAL rifles.

- Iran-Iraq War (1980–1988)
- Ugandan Bush War (1980–1986)
- Internal conflict in Peru (1980–present)
- Falklands War (1982)
- Second Sudanese Civil War (1983–2005)
- Thai–Laotian Border War (1987–1988)
- Bougainville conflict (1988–1998)
- 1989 attack on La Tablada barracks

=== 1990s ===
- Gulf War (1990–1991)
- Rwandan Civil War (1990–1994)
- Croatian War of Independence (1991–1995)
- Burundian Civil War (1993–2005)
- Cenepa War (1995)
- First Congo War (1996–1997)
- Second Liberian Civil War (1999-2003)

=== 2000s ===
- War on terror (2001–2021)
- Kivu conflict (2004–2009, 2012–2013, 2015–present)
- Insurgency in Paraguay (2005–present)
- Mexican drug war (2006–present)
- 2008–2013 Cambodian–Thai border crisis
- Boko Haram insurgency (2009–present)

=== 2010s ===
- Rio de Janeiro security crisis (2010)
- Militias-Comando Vermelho conflict (2010–present)
- First Libyan Civil War (2011)
- Syrian Civil War (2011–2024)
- Iraqi insurgency (2011–2013)
- South Sudanese Civil War (2013–2020)
- Yemeni Civil War (2014–present)
- Saudi Arabian–led intervention in Yemen (2015–present)

=== 2020s ===
- Russian invasion of Ukraine (2022–present)
- Gaza war (2023–present)
- Sudanese civil war (2023–present)

== See also ==
- Armalite AR-16, an American 7.62 battle rifle
- FN CAL, an unsuccessful FN 5.56mm NATO assault rifle that externally resembles the FAL
- FN-49, predecessor to the FAL
- Heckler & Koch G3, a German 7.62 battle rifle designed in the 1950s
- Howa Type 64
- IMBEL IA2
- IMBEL MD97
- KAL1 general purpose infantry rifle, an Australian bullpup conversion
- List of 7.62×51mm NATO firearms
- List of battle rifles
- ParaFAL
