= Dieudonné Saive =

Belgian firearm designer

- Born: Dieudonné Joseph Saive; 23 May 1888; Wandre, Belgium
- Died: 12 October 1970 (aged 82); Wandre, Belgium
- Occupation(s): Inventor, gunsmith, firearms designer

Dieudonné Joseph Saive (French: [djødɔne ʒozɛf sɛːv]; 23 May 1888 – 12 October 1970) was a Belgian small arms designer who designed several well-known firearms for Belgian armsmaker Fabrique Nationale, including the Model 1949 and the FAL (Fusil Automatique Leger or Light Automatic Rifle) rifles. He is also known for modifying several of John Browning's firearms designs, including the 1931 Baby Browning and Browning Hi-Power pistols.

== Career ==
In 1921, the French military requested that Fabrique Nationale create a new semi-automatic nine millimetre pistol with a 15-round magazine. John Browning, who was FN's chief weapons designer, initially declined to respond to the French request because he felt standard single-row magazines holding seven or eight rounds (such as was used in his Colt's Model 1911) were sufficient. Saive, who was then Browning's assistant at FN, set to work designing a high-capacity, double-row magazine similar to those used in LMGs and SMGs of the time. Saive mated his experimental magazine to a modified FN Model 1903 for testing. Saive then provided the completed magazine to Browning who developed two 9 mm pistol designs using locked and unlocked breeches. Browning and Colt's Patent Fire Arms Manufacturing Co. submitted a U.S. patent application for the locked-breech version of the pistol on 28 June 1923. The patent was granted on 22 February 1927, four months after Browning's death at FN's plant in Liège, Belgium. Colt's elected to concentrate on manufacturing its hugely successful Model 1911 instead of either of Browning's new 9 mm pistols so Browning's son Val offered the design to FN. This pistol design, modified after Browning's death, was offered as the 13-shot FN Browning Model 1922 or Grand Rendement (meaning High Yield). Following the expiration of the patents on the Model 1911, Saive redesigned the Grand Rendement to incorporate the best features of both pistols in the FN Model 1928, which still bore Browning's name.

In 1928, Saive traveled to Yugoslavia to set up the state arsenal in Kragujevac.

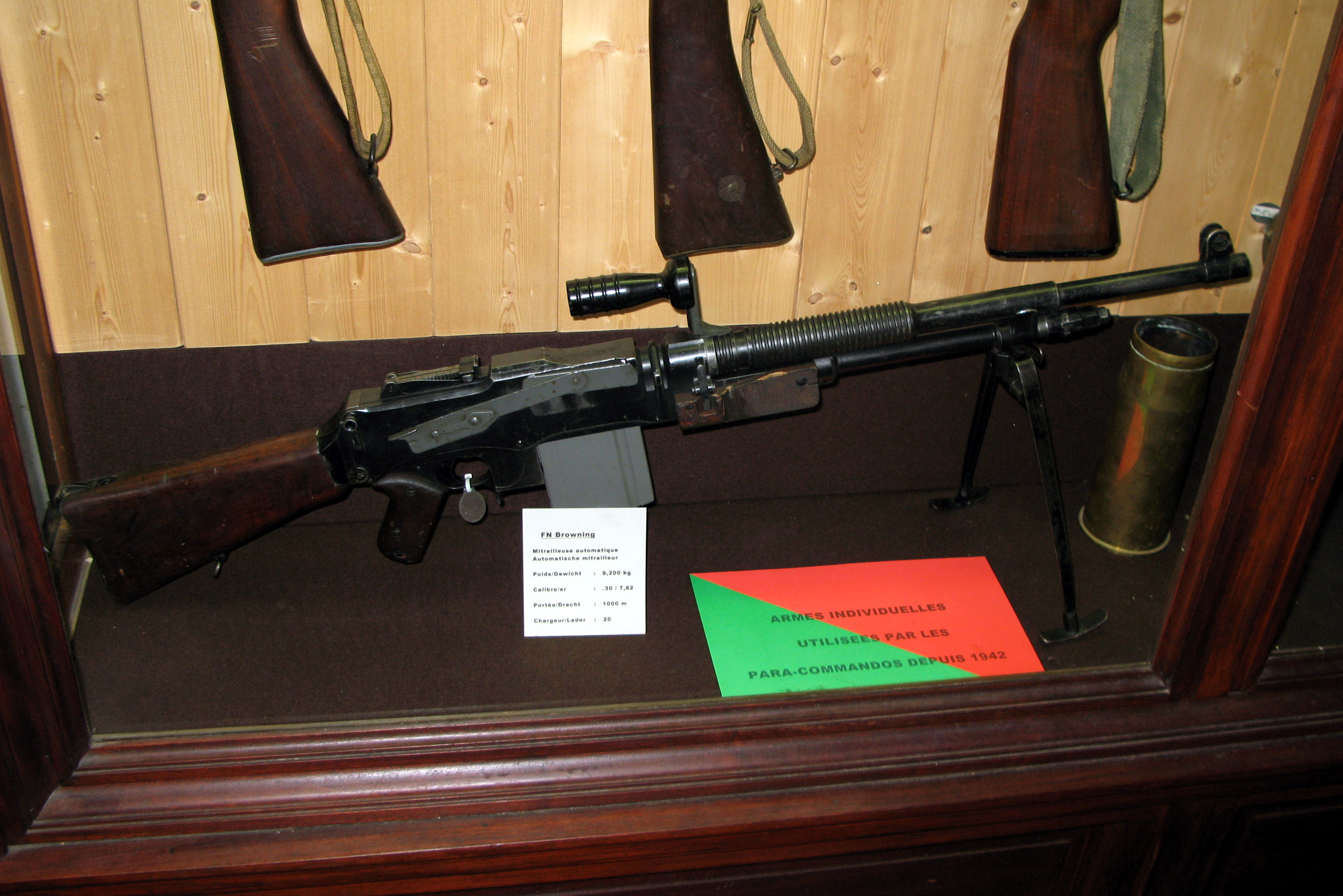
FN Mle D BAR variant featuring a quick-change barrel

In 1929, Saive returned to Belgium where he oversaw the manufacture of the commercial version of the Browning Automatic Rifle (BAR). By 1930, Saive was promoted to become FN's chief weapons designer (Chef de Service). Saive improved the operating mechanism of the .30 cal. M1919 Browning M2 AN aircraft machine gun in 1932, increasing its rate of fire to 1,200 rpm. In 1938, he made additional improvements to the M2 further increasing its rate of fire to 1,500 rpm. During the same period, Saive continued to improve the Grand Rendement, and by 1934 the French term Grande Puissance ("Hi-Power") was first applied to the evolved design which became the French GP-35 self-loading pistol or FN Browning Hi-Power. The Hi-Power was the first 9×19mm handgun to utilize a true staggered-column box magazine. The large magazine enabled the weapon to carry a total of fourteen cartridges without an excessively oversized or protruding handgrip.

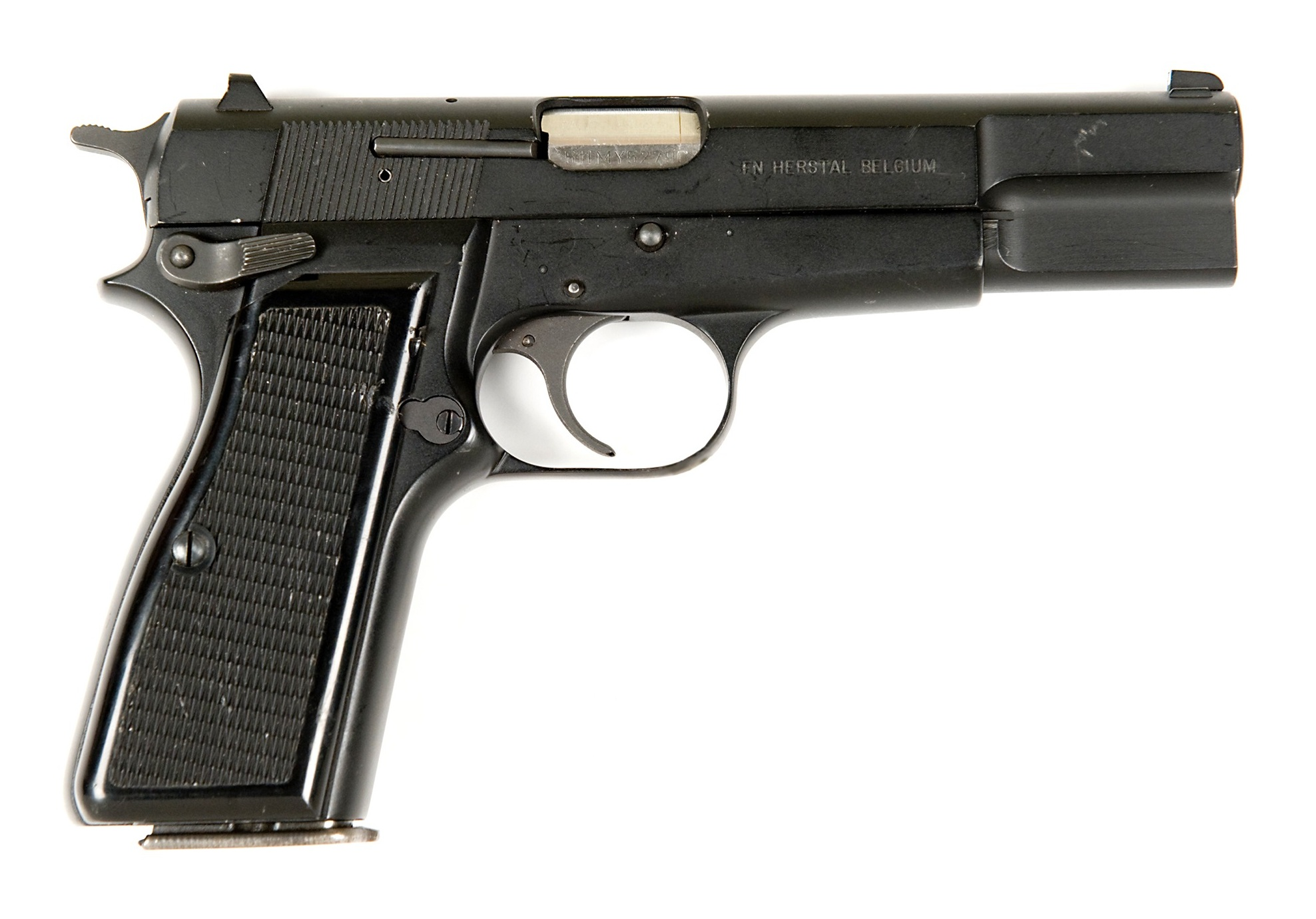
FN Browning Hi-Power

France declined to adopt the Hi-Power for its armed forces, instead using the Modèle 1935 pistol. Despite this rejection, the Hi-Power was a sales success with more than 56,000 produced by May 1940, mostly for the Belgian military. It was used extensively in World War II by many nations including the British Commonwealth and Chinese forces. More than 65,000 Hi-Power pistols were also used by German forces, renamed Pistole 640(b), after the Germans captured FN's manufacturing plant in Liège on 12 May 1940. Saive fled the German invasion, eventually arriving in London in mid-1941. He was soon at work at the Royal Small Arms Factory Enfield Design Department at the Drill Hall in Cheshunt, England, recreating production drawings for the Hi-Power and further developing his design for a gas-operated rifle called the EXP-1, later the FN Model 1949. By June 1943, the British modified Saive's technical drawings to produce the British Mk. I model of the Hi-Power. In April 1943, China requested 180,000 Hi-Powers with hollow wooden shoulder stocks that also served as holsters through a Mutual Aid Plan with Canada. The Chinese were familiar with the Mauser C96 "Broomhandle" that came with a stock/holster and wanted the same thing for the Hi-Powers they requested. The Canadian contract was with the Inglis firm who hired Saive and Rene Laloux, also a Belgian engineer, to work on production. After the war, the Browning Hi-Power was adopted as the standard military service sidearm of many Western countries, including the United Kingdom and Australia. Slightly modernized versions remain in production today, three-quarters of a century later.

After World War II the Swedish Army, who used two 6.5×55mm versions of the Browning Automatic Rifle (BAR) since the 1920s, wanted to replace them with a belt-fed version. FFV-Carl Gustaf tried to design a derivative, but their belt feeding mechanism (placed below the action, like on the BAR) did not pass military trials. Therefore FN Herstal was approached, and Belgian designers came up with the idea to flip the BAR action upside down and mate it with the proven MG 42 belt-feeding mechanism. The work was started in the late 1940s by Dieudonné Saive, who previously designed the FN Mle D BAR variant, and finished by Ernest Vervier in 1953, with Swedish trials beginning in 1955. The general-purpose machine gun first entered production in 1958 (Ksp 58 chambered in 6.5×55mm), and it is sometimes referred to as the MAG-58. The widely successful FN MAG general-purpose machine gun served as a complement to the FN FAL battle rifle.

=== Saive's gas-operated rifle designs ===
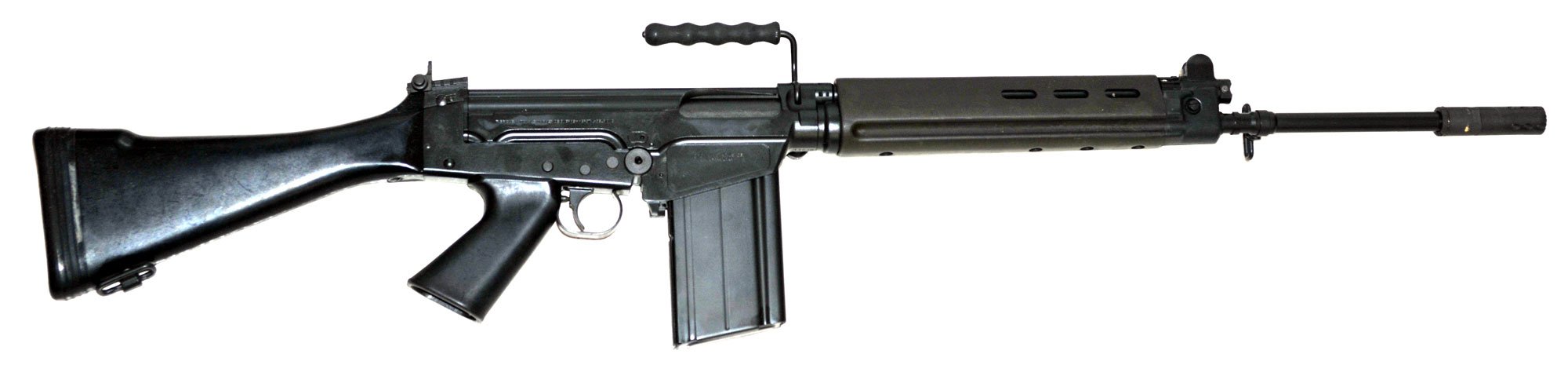
A standard FAL (50.00 model) produced by FN

Saive is most famous for his series of gas-operated self-loading rifle designs, which used a tipping bolt to lock the action. His FN-49 rifle went into production, and was later developed into the widely successful FN FAL selective fire battle rifle.
