= Historical weaponry of the Australian Army =

Since the formation of the Australian Army on 1 March 1901, it has used a variety of weaponry and equipment, sourced mainly from British, American and less frequently, other European manufacturers, but also weapons and equipment produced by local Australian manufacturers.

The Australian Army came into being when the six British colonies of Australia all held referendums to join, and voted in favour of forming a federation, creating the modern nation of the Commonwealth of Australia on 1 January 1901. Prior to doing so, each of the Australian colonies were responsible for their own defence, and all had separate colonial armies. As each colonial army was responsible for the defence of their own colony, each colony separately contracted the purchase of their own equipment, so at the time that each colonial army merged into the newly formed Australian Army, there was a variety of incompatible equipment used by the various interstate units.

One of the first tasks of the newly formed Army following restructure and the creation of unified hierarchy and command chains, was to uniformly equip the new national army. This was no easy task, as at the time of the foundation of the Australian Army, all six colonial armies were in the field involved in the Second Boer War. Whilst badge-changing ceremonies were performed and hats and uniforms supplied, it proved impractical to fully re-equip in the field. Consequently, the Martini–Henry rifle, which was favoured by the majority of colonial units, continued in use until about 1910.

== Second Boer War ==
The Australian Army was founded by a merger of the six separate armies of the six independent Australian British colonies. When those forces merged officially on 1 March 1901, during the Second Boer War in South Africa, all six colonies had troops already engaged in combat in the field. It was obviously impossible and unnecessary to completely re-equip and re-uniform the forces while they were deployed, and most of the colonial armies wore similar khaki uniforms anyway. A symbolic ceremony to replace colonial badges was held in the field during which Australian soldiers were given the Rising Sun Badge, the new symbol of the Australian Army, for the first time.

=== Infantry weapons ===
Side-arms

- (United Kingdom) Beaumont–Adams revolver (.450 calibre)
- (United Kingdom) Enfield revolver (.476 calibre)
- (United Kingdom) Webley revolver (.455 calibre)

Long-arms

- (United Kingdom) Martini–Henry rifle (.577/.450 calibre)
- (United Kingdom) Snider–Enfield rifle (.577 calibre)
- (United Kingdom) Lee–Enfield rifle (.303 calibre)
- (United Kingdom) Lee–Metford rifle (.303 calibre)

=== Horses ===
- Waler horse

== First World War ==
By the outbreak of World War I, the equipment of the Australian Army had become standardised, and was essentially the same as most of the armies of the British Empire. The one major difference was the preference of kangaroo leather over canvas for webbing and other equipment, straps and belts.

=== Infantry weapons ===
Side-arms

- (United Kingdom) Enfield revolver (.476 calibre)
- (United Kingdom) Webley revolver (.455 calibre)

Long-arms

- (United Kingdom) Lee–Enfield rifle (.303 calibre)

Grenade

- (Australia) Jam Tin Grenade
- (United Kingdom) Mills Bomb

Light machine-gun

- (United States) Lewis Gun (.303 calibre)
- (France) Hotchkiss Gun (.303 calibre) used by the Light Horse

Heavy machine-gun

- (United Kingdom) Vickers machine gun (.303 calibre)
Infantry-support
- (United Kingdom) Stokes Mortar (3 inch calibre)

=== Horses ===
- Waler horse

=== Artillery ===
Trench Mortar

- (United Kingdom) Garland Trench Mortar (65mm)
- (United Kingdom) 2 inch Medium Mortar

Heavy mortar

- (United Kingdom) 9.45 inch Heavy Mortar

Field guns

- (United Kingdom) 4.5 inch Howitzer
- (United Kingdom) 18-Pounder Field Gun

=== Vehicles ===
Armoured Cars

- (United States) Model T Ford (with mounted Lewis Gun)
- (United Kingdom) Rolls-Royce Type A (with mounted Lewis Gun)
- 50 HP Daimler (with mounted M1895 Colt–Browning machine gun)
- 60 HP Mercedes (with mounted M1895 Colt–Browning machine gun)
- (Belgium) 50 HP Minerva (with mounted M1895 Colt–Browning machine gun)

=== Aircraft ===
(The Australian Flying Corps which served in WWI was an Army unit, not a separate airforce.)

- (United Kingdom) Airco DH 5
- (United Kingdom) Airco DH.6
- (United Kingdom) Armstrong Whitworth F.K.3
- (United Kingdom) Avro 504
- (France) Bleriot XI
- (United Kingdom) Bristol Boxkite
- (United Kingdom) Bristol F.2 Fighter
- (United Kingdom) Bristol Scout
- (France) Caudron G.3
- (United States) Curtiss JN Jenny
- (France) Deperdussin
- (United Kingdom) Grahame-White Type XV Boxkite
- (United Kingdom) Handley Page 0/400
- (United Kingdom) Martinsyde S.1
- (United Kingdom) Martinsyde G.100
- (United Kingdom) Martinsyde G.102
- (France) Farman MF.7 Longhorn
- (France) Farman MF.11 Shorthorn
- (France) Maurice Farman Seaplane/Landplane
- (United Kingdom) Royal Aircraft Factory B.E.2
- (United Kingdom) Royal Aircraft Factory B.E.12
- (United Kingdom) Royal Aircraft Factory F.E.2
- (United Kingdom) Royal Aircraft Factory R.E.8
- (United Kingdom) Royal Aircraft Factory S.E.5A
- (United Kingdom) Sopwith Buffalo (two prototypes for trials only)
- (United Kingdom) Sopwith Baby (one aircraft flown by the Royal Australian Navy in 1917)
- (United Kingdom) Sopwith Camel (AFC, RAN)
- (United Kingdom) Sopwith Pup (AFC, RAN)
- (United Kingdom) Sopwith Snipe
- (United Kingdom) Sopwith 1½ Strutter (AFC, RAN)

== Second World War ==
At the beginning of World War II, the Australian Army was continuing with the practice of sourcing military equipment from the United Kingdom as it had done in the colonial era and the first three decades of the twentieth century. However, as the war progressed, Britain's difficulties in keeping up production demand, Australia's geographic isolation, and a differing focus on war policies and theatres, caused Australia increasingly to obtain arms, equipment, and military assistance from the United States.

=== Infantry weapons ===
Side-arms

- (United Kingdom) Enfield Revolver MK II (.38 calibre)
- (United Kingdom) Webley Revolver MK IV (.38 calibre)
- (United States) Smith & Wesson Victory (.38 calibre)
- (United Kingdom) Webley Revolver MK VI (.455 calibre)

Rifles

- (United Kingdom) Lee–Enfield SMLE No.1 MkIII* Rifle (.303 calibre)
- (United Kingdom) Lee–Enfield No.4 MkI/MkI* Rifle (.303 calibre) (used in small quantities by frontline forces. Mostly went to arm secondary units, commando units and the Volunteer Defence Corps)
- (United States) Pattern 1914 Enfield (Used in small numbers as a sniper rifle.)

Grenade

- (United Kingdom) Mills Bomb M36

Sub-machine-gun

- (Australia) Owen Gun (9mm calibre)
- (Australia) Austen MK I (and MK II) (9×19mm Parabellum)
- (United States) Thompson submachine gun (.45 calibre)

Light machine-gun

- (United States) Lewis Gun (.303 calibre) (Mainly used as anti aircraft weapon:)
- (United Kingdom) Bren Gun (.303 calibre)

Heavy machine-gun

- (United Kingdom) Vickers Machine Gun (.303 calibre)
Infantry-support
- (United Kingdom) Stokes Mortar (3 inch calibre)
- (United Kingdom) Flamethrower, Portable, No 2 (flamethrower)

Anti-armour

- (United Kingdom) Rifle, Anti-Tank, .55 in, Boys (.551 calibre)
- (United Kingdom) PIAT

=== Artillery ===
Mortars

- (United Kingdom) 2 inch Medium Mortar
- (United Kingdom) 3 inch Medium Mortar

Heavy mortar

- (United Kingdom) 9.45 inch Heavy Mortar

Field guns

- (United Kingdom) 4.5 inch Howitzer
- (United Kingdom) Ordnance QF 18 pounder Field Gun
- (United Kingdom) Ordnance QF 25 pounder Field Gun

=== Vehicles ===
Amphibious vehicles

- (United States) DUKW
- (United States) Amphibious Jeep
Scout cars
- (Australia) Dingo
- (Australia) S1 Scout Car

Armoured cars

- (Australia) Rover Light Armoured Car
- (United Kingdom) Bren Carrier
- (United States) Staghound

Tanks

- (Australia) Australian Cruiser Tank Mk1 - Sentinel
- (United Kingdom) Churchill Tank
- (United Kingdom) Cruiser Tank
- (United Kingdom) Matilda Tank
- (United States) Grant Tank
- (United States) Sherman Tank (3 for trials purposes only)
- (United States) Stuart Tank

== Korean War ==
When the Korean War began many Australian units were still equipped with weapons that they had used during World War II. Whilst there were minor changes such as the replacement of the British QF 4.5 inch Howitzer by the American-built 105 mm Howitzer M3 as the primary artillery piece, the most dramatic changes to Australian equipment during the Korean War period were to the aircraft used by the Royal Australian Air Force. Important lessons learned during the Korean War later influenced the way the Australian Army re-equipped to adapt to the needs of modern warfare in time for the Australian Army's entry into the Vietnam War.

=== Infantry weapons ===
Side-arms

- (United Kingdom) Enfield Revolver MK II (.380 calibre)
- (United Kingdom) Webley Revolver MK IV (.38 calibre)
- (United States) M1911

Long-arms

- (United Kingdom) Lee–Enfield SMLE No.1 MkIII* Rifle (.303 calibre)
- (United Kingdom) Lee–Enfield No.4 MkI Rifle (.303 calibre) (in limited use)

Grenade

- (United Kingdom) Mills Bomb M36

Sub-machine-guns

- (Australia) Owen Gun (9mm calibre)
- (United Kingdom) Sterling Submachine Gun (Trials)

Light machine-gun

- (United Kingdom) Bren Gun (.303 calibre)

Heavy machine-gun

- (United Kingdom) Vickers Machine Gun (.303 calibre)
Infantry-support
- (United Kingdom) SBML 2 inch Mortar
- (United Kingdom) Ordnance ML 3 inch Mortar
- (United States) M2A2 flamethrower

Anti-armour

- (United States) M20 Bazooka (89 mm)
- (United Kingdom) Ordnance QF 17 pounder

== Vietnam War ==
The Vietnam War proved to be a highly mobile operation for Australian forces, who often engaged their enemies during arduous jungle patrols through thick and difficult terrain. Much of the equipment used on the battlefields of the Korean War proved to be too cumbersome for this type of warfare, including long-arms such as the Lee–Enfield SMLEs. However, the Australian Army had become an expert at jungle warfare during their campaigns in South-East Asia against the Imperial Japanese Army in World War II, and the lessons in jungle warfare they had learned proved invaluable in the choosing of equipment for the Vietnam War. Long rifles continued to be used by snipers, but infantry patrols favoured the use of battle rifles such as the L1A1 and assault rifles such as the M16. The heavy machine-guns which were useful for the static defences of the Korean War were replaced by the lighter general-purpose M60 machine gun, which was man-portable by a patrol machine-gunner.

=== Infantry weapons ===
Side-arms

- (United States) Colt 1911A1 (.45 calibre)
- (United States) L9A1 Browning Hi-Power (9×19mm Parabellum)

Long-arms

- (Australia) L1A1 Self-Loading Rifle (licensed FN FAL derivative) (7.62 calibre)
- (United States) M14 rifle (used by the Special Air Service Regiment)
- (United States) M21 Sniper Weapon System (used on a small scale by Australian troops in the later years of the Vietnam War)

Grenades

- (United States) M26 grenade
- (United States) M79 grenade launcher
- (Australia) / (United States) various smoke grenades

Assault rifles

- (United States) Colt M16A1 (5.56 calibre)
- (United States) Colt M16A1 (5.56 calibre) fitted with under-barrel M203 grenade launcher

Sub-machine-guns

- (Australia) F1 submachine gun (9×19mm Parabellum)
- (Australia) Owen Gun (9×19mm Parabellum)
- (United Kingdom) Sterling submachine gun (used by Australian SAS troopers in Vietnam)
- (United States) CAR-15 (5.56 calibre) (used by Australian SAS troopers)

General-purpose machine gun

- (United States) M60 machine gun (7.62 calibre)
- (Australia) L2A1 LMG SLR Varient (7.62 calibre)
- (Australia) L4A1 Bren Varient (7.62 calibre)
- (United States) L3(A3&A4) GPMG Browning M1919 Varients (.30-06 calibre)
- (United States) M2HB Heavy Machinegun (.50 calibre)
Infantry-support
- (United Kingdom) L16 81mm Mortar
- (United States) M2A1-7 flamethrower

Anti-personnel

- (United States) M18A1 Claymore Antipersonnel Mine

Anti-armour

- (United States) M72 Light Anti-tank Weapon
- (United States) M20 Bazooka
- (France) ENTAC Anti-tank guided missile

=== Artillery ===
- (United States) M2A2 howitzer
- (Italy) L5 (Aust) Pack Howitzer 105-mm (103 Battery)

=== Vehicles ===
- (United Kingdom) Land Rover series

Armoured Personnel Carriers

- (United States) M113 Armoured Personnel Carrier
- (Australia) Fire Support vehicle (FSV) (hybrid of M113 with Alvis Saladin turret fitted)

Tanks

- (United Kingdom) Centurion tank

=== Aircraft ===
- (United States) Cessna 180
- (United States) Pilatus PC-6
- (United States) Bell H-13 Sioux
- (United States) UH-1 Iroquois (RAAF)
- (Canada) DHC-4 Caribou (RAAF)
- (United Kingdom) Canberra Bomber (RAAF)

== Late 20th Century ==
After the Vietnam war the Australian Army suffered severe budget cut-backs, and expenditure on equipment decreased as a result. The army was scaled back in size, and experienced a period of very little overseas deployment for the first time in the post–World War II period. Despite this the Army did manage to continue to modernise its weaponry and equipment. During the 1980s traditional long-arms such as the L1A1 Self-Loading Rifle (SLR) were phased out and finally withdrawn from front line service by 1990, and replaced by the locally produced F88 Austeyr, a derivative of the Austrian Steyr AUG which is still in service as of 2008. During the 1980s the khaki field uniforms that had been used by the Australian Army since its foundation in 1901 were replaced by Disruptive Pattern Combat Uniform.

=== Infantry weapons ===
Side-arms

- (United States) L9A1 Browning Hi-Power (9×19mm Parabellum)

Long-arms

- (Australia) L1A1 Self-Loading Rifle (licensed FN FAL derivative) (7.62 calibre)
- (United Kingdom) Parker Hale M82 (.308 calibre Sniper-Rifle)

Grenades

- (Australia) F1 grenade
- (United States) M79 grenade launcher
- (Australia) / (United States) various smoke grenades

Assault rifles

- (Australia) F88 Austeyr (locally produced Steyr AUG derivative, adopted 1988, replaced by later variants of the Austeyr) (5.56 NATO calibre)
- (United States) (Singapore) M16A1 /M16S1 Used by the Australian Army until 1989 when the F88 Austeyr came into service. Australian forces involved in UN peacekeeping operations in Namibia, Western Sahara, and Cambodia used the M16A1 rifle well into the early 1990s.

Light machine-gun

- (Australia) F1 Submachine Gun (9×19mm Parabellum)
- (Belgium) FN Minimi as F89 (5.56 calibre)
- (United Kingdom) Sterling Submachine Gun (9×19mm Parabellum)

General-purpose machine guns

- (United Kingdom) Bren Gun as L4A1 (7.62 calibre)
- (Australia) L2A1 LMG SLR Varient (7.62 calibre)
- (United States) L3(A3&A4) GPMG Browning M1919 Varients (.30-06 calibre)
- (United States) M2HB Heavy Machinegun (.50 calibre)
- (United States) M60 machine gun
- (Belgium) FN MAG
- (West Germany) MG3 - Used on Leopard 1

Infantry-support

- (United States) M252 Mortar
- (United States) M9A1-7 Flame Thrower (limited number acquired for training before political concerns led to the phase out of flame weapons in 1990)

Anti-personnel

- (United States) M18A1 Claymore Antipersonnel Mine

Anti-armour

- (United States) M72 Light Anti-tank Weapon
- (Sweden) Carl Gustav recoilless rifle
- (France) ENTAC Anti-tank guided missile
- (France) / (Germany) MILAN Anti-tank guided missile

=== Artillery ===
- (United Kingdom) L118 Light Gun
- (United States) 105 mm Howitzer M3
- (United States) M198 howitzer
  - (United States) M712 Copperhead 155mm projectile
- (United States) M2A2 howitzer

Anti-aircraft weapons

- (United Kingdom) Rapier surface-to-air missile
- (United States) FIM-43 Redeye surface-to-air missile

=== Vehicles ===
- (United Kingdom) Land Rover series II

Scout cars

- (Australia) Medium Reconnaissance Vehicle (MRV) (hybrid of M113 with FV101 Scorpion turret)

Armoured Personnel Carriers

- (United States) M113 Armoured Personnel Carrier

Tanks

- (West Germany) Leopard AS1 tank

=== Aircraft ===
Fixed Wing

- (Australia) Pilatus Porter
- (Australia) GAF Nomad
- de Havilland Canada DHC-6 Twin Otter
- (United States) Beechcraft Super King Air

Rotary Wing

- (United States) Bell 206B Kiowa (Light Recon)
- (United States) Bell UH-1H Iroquois (Battlefield Support)
- (United States) S-70A Black Hawk

== Bibliography ==
- Dennis, Peter; et al. (2008). The Oxford Companion to Australian Military History (Second ed.). Melbourne: Oxford University Press Australia & New Zealand. ISBN 978-0-19-551784-2.
- Kuring, Ian (2004). Redcoats to Cams: A History of Australian Infantry 1788–2001. Loftus: Australian Military Historical Publications. ISBN 1-876439-99-8.
- Skennerton, Ian (1975). Australian Service Longarms (Second ed.). Margate: Self Published. ISBN 0-9597438-0-4.
- Skennerton, Ian (1989). 100 Years of Australian Service Machine Guns (Second ed.). Labrador: Arms & Militaria Press. ISBN 0-949749-12-5.
