= Evelyn Owen =

Australian soldier and inventor

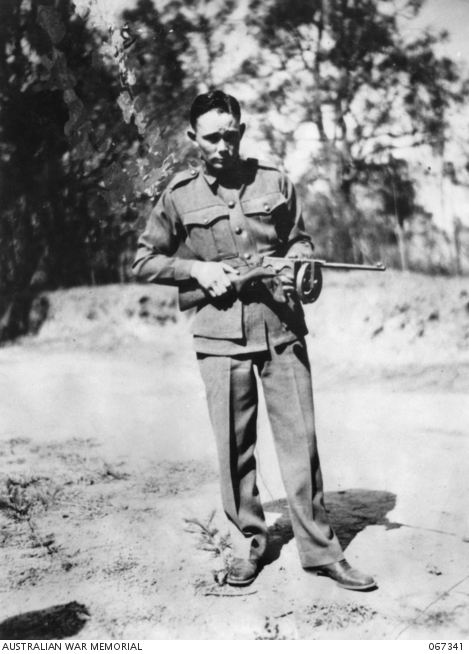
- Owen holding the first experimental model of the Owen gun
- Born: 15 May 1915; Wollongong, Australia
- Died: 1 April 1949 (aged 33); Wollongong, Australia
- Military career
- Allegiance: Australia
- Branch: Australian Army
- Service years: 1940–1941
- Rank: Private
- Nickname: Evo

Private Evelyn Ernest Owen (15 May 1915 – 1 April 1949) was an Australian soldier and inventor who created the Owen gun, which was used by the Australian Army during World War II, the Korean War and the Vietnam War.

== Early life ==
Evelyn Owen was born on 15 May 1915 in Wollongong, New South Wales. He attended Wollongong High School but was not particularly academically inclined. Having an independent streak, he set up a ready-mixed mortar business with his brother; this venture subsequently failed.

Despite his lack of a technical background, Owen had a keen interest in firearms. This interest led him to develop a submachine gun, which he believed would be widely used in modern warfare.

== Development of the Owen gun ==
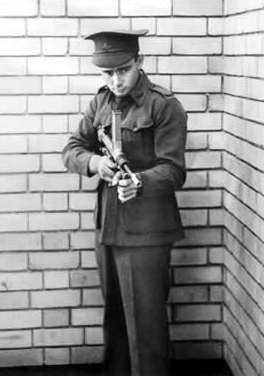
Owen and Owen gun in March 1941

By 1938, Owen had constructed a prototype which used .22 LR ammunition. The following year, he took the gun to an ordnance officer at Victoria Barracks in Sydney. Despite advising that the gun could be upgraded to a larger calibre, Owen was told that the Australian Army would not be interested. Submachine guns, such as the Thompson, were regarded as being unimportant, and furthermore, there was a perception in the army that such weapons were for gangsters rather than soldiers.

Owen, disappointed with the lack of interest in his firearm, enlisted in the Second Australian Imperial Force (AIF) in May 1940. He was assigned to the 2/17th Battalion. However, just before embarking for the Middle East with his unit, he managed to interest the manager of the Port Kembla plant of Lysaght's Newcastle Works, Vincent Wardell, in the gun. Australia had no experience in the development of mass-produced firearms and relied entirely on designs from the United Kingdom for the manufacture of its small arms. Wardell believed that the gun could be quickly manufactured in Australia in quantity and raised the matter with Lysaght's owner, Essington Lewis. Lewis arranged for Owen to meet with a representative of the army's Central Inventions Board, Captain C. M. Dyer.

The German Army's use of submachine guns during the French Campaign of 1940 had demonstrated the potential of such weapons, and consequently some elements of the Australian Army were now more receptive to the value of Owen's gun. Dyer, despite a lack of enthusiasm from his superiors, arranged for Owen to obtain leave with a view to constructing more prototypes. Working with Lysaght, by March 1941 Owen produced versions utilising .32 ACP semi-rimmed and .45 ACP rimless ammunition. Trials with these prototypes were such that a formal approach was made to the Master-General of the Ordnance, Major General Edward Milford.

One potential barrier to the adaption of the Owen gun by the army was the development of the Sten gun in the United Kingdom, which was expected to be available by the end of 1941. Milford advised Owen that the army was prepared to wait for the Sten, unaware that significant compromises had been made to the design of the Sten to facilitate mass production. However, the government, in the form of the Minister for the Army, Percy Spender overruled the decision and placed an order for 100 guns. This allowed large-scale testing to be completed.

In late June 1941, Owen was discharged from the AIF and began work at Lysaght who manufactured his gun. In September 1941 his gun was ready for testing against similar weapons: the American Thompson Machine Gun, the Sten and the German Bergmann. The Owen proved superior to the other weapons and having been variously immersed in water, mud and sand, it also proved itself almost impossible to jam while the other weapons faltered and eventually became unworkable. As a result of the success of the trials, the initial order of 100 firearms was increased to 2,000. After further difficulties, the Owen gun entered mass production in Australia.

The gun was eventually patented in 1943, and Owen, the patentee, received royalties per gun built. He later sold the rights to the patent to the Commonwealth of Australia.

By late 1942, the Owen was being used in jungle fighting against the Japanese in New Guinea. Despite the development of an Australian variant of the Sten, the Austen, the Owen was found to still be the weapon of choice amongst soldiers. More than 45,000 Owen guns were produced during the Second World War and they continued in use during the Korean War, the Malayan Emergency and in the early years of the Vietnam War.

== Later life ==
Owen received £10,000 in royalties and from the sale of patent rights, and used the money to establish a sawmill near Wollongong. His interest in firearms was undiminished and he continued to develop and experiment with guns, notably sports rifles. A heavy drinker, Owen was admitted to Wollongong hospital where he died from a ruptured gastric ulcer on 1 April 1949 at the age of 33.
