= Vincent Wardell =

- Born: 13 May 1903; St Kilda, Victoria, Australia
- Died: 17 July 1990 (aged 87); Newcastle, New South Wales, Australia
- Other names: Aloysius
- Occupation: Manager
- Known for: Business and management skills

Vincent Andrew Wardell (1903–1990) was an Australian businessman, manufacturer and company director. In 1939 he was appointed assistant manager at Lysaght's steel works in Port Kembla, New South Wales and by 1944 was both its manager and one of its directors.

== Biography ==
Born in St Kilda, Victoria, Wardell was a member of a large family of ten children, six boys and four girls. His parents were Edward Stanfield Wardell and Georgina Mary, née Brady. He attended St. Joseph's CBC, North Melbourne in 1914 and 1915 with his brother Gerald before moving to Castlemaine, Victoria. Wardell's father, a Deputy Governor at the Melbourne Mint, had retired in 1915 and had moved into the property known as Clontarf located just outside the Castlemaine city centre. On relocating to the country Wardell continued his education at Castlemaine High School.

Wardell did well in his secondary school work and in 1922 he was awarded a Donovan Bursary to continue his studies at Newman College (University of Melbourne). At the end of his first year he achieved a pass in Science, with second class honours in Geology and third class honours in Chemistry.

== Business ventures ==
Like his grandfather, William Wardell, Vincent was a prodigious worker, anxious to get ahead and make a name in professional circles. Wardell gained a Bachelor of Science degree in 1926 from his time at university and began operating as a metallurgist, sharing rooms in Collins Street, Melbourne with his brother Joseph, a respected wool buyer. The position was short lived and by 1930 he and his brother Gerald had moved to Tasmania to work in a zinc factory. In 1931 he moved to New South Wales and began work at the Lysaght works in Newcastle now known as Lysaght.

As a manager with Lysaght, Wardell formed a business partnership with Evelyn Owen to develop a lightweight submachine gun for the Australian Army, the Owen gun.

== Later life ==
Wardell was twice married. In 1933 he wed Phyllis Sydney Wansey at Newcastle, but was divorced in 1952. Margaret Florence Lord, a well known interior designer, became his second wife in 1955. Throughout his later life Wardell maintained a keen interest in business affairs until his death in 1990.

== Bibliography ==
- The Owen gun, 1991, Wayne Wardman ISBN 978-0731603657
- The Owen gun files: An Australian wartime controversy, 1994, Kevin Smith ISBN 978-0908031542
