= Lysaght (Australian company) =

Australian steel manufacturing company

- Industry: Steel
- Founded: 1880
- Founder: John Lysaght
- Headquarters: Australia
- Owner: BlueScope
- Website: www.lysaght.com

Lysaght is an Australian company that was founded in 1880 by John Lysaght as a subsidiary to the company John Lysaght and Co. The company pioneered modern steel coating technologies (galvanisation). Its coated steel building products were sold under the 'ORB' brand and contributed to Australian architectural style.

== History ==
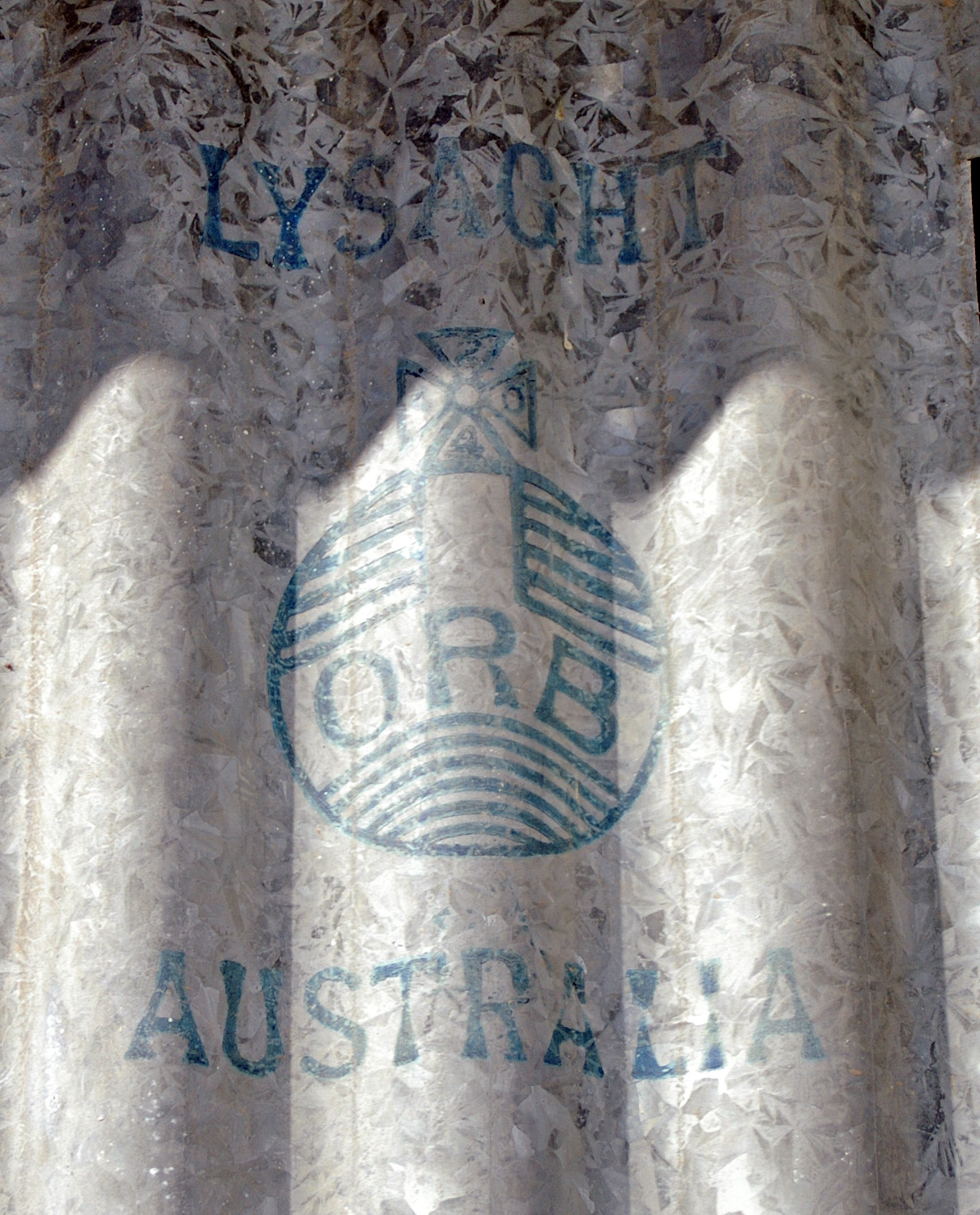
ORB corrugated iron

In 1857 John Lysaght and Co. was established in England at the St Vincent's Works in Bristol and commenced manufacturing corrugated iron. The firm exported to many countries including Australia and South America. By 1880 Lysaghts was exporting enough corrugated iron to Australia to establish a central selling agency in Melbourne. Utilizing this demand, John Lysaght set up Victoria Galvanised Iron and Wire Company in order to get around import restrictions.

In 1897 the company first published the Lysaght Referee, detailing the products sold by Lysaght. The publication progressively expanded with technical information of value to the ironworkers, farmers and architects, still issued free of charge in 1938.

The original Lysaght brand of corrugated iron was Orb, followed in 1897 by a cheaper version of Redcliffe. Both brands were exported in large quantities to Australia. Globe was a brand produced for American and African markets but some quantities ended up in Australia.

Galvanized sheet and plate was also made, between 1893 and 1912, at the Eskbank steelworks in Lithgow, by a competitor. The brand was Eskbank and the sheets were corrugated for roofing. The galvanizing plant was primitive but produced a good quality product, albeit in small quantities. In 1905, negotiations took place with William Sandford for John Lysaght to take a share in the Eskbank works; but this did not progress. The Eskbank works was taken over by G & C Hoskins in 1908. Hoskins would be an erstwhile small-scale competitor with Lysaght.

In 1918 John Lysaght (Australia) Pty Ltd was incorporated with the head office transferred from Melbourne to Sydney. In 1921 a sheet rolling and galvanising works was established next to BHP in Newcastle. In 1936, the sheet mill and galvanising works of Australian Iron & Steel at Port Kembla was purchased. In 1939, in a joint venture with American Rolling Mills, the Commonwealth Rolling Mills was opened in Port Kembla. In 1947, Lysaght bought the American Rolling Mills share.

From 1942 to 1944, during World War II, Lysaght's Works manufactured the Owen gun, producing 45,000 units for the Australian Army. The gun was designed by Evelyn Owen and introduced to Lysaght by his neighbour Vincent Wardell. The gun, which survived tough conditions, was highly popular with Australian soldiers, who gave it the affectionate nickname of "Digger's Darling".

In 1961 Lysaght became a public company with 20% of the shares sold to the public. In 1969 BHP purchased a 24% shareholding. In 1970, BHP and GKN took over the business each owing 50%. In 1971 Lysaght acquired the steel building products division of Brownbuilt and renamed it Lysaght Brownbuilt Industries. In 1979 it became a 100% subsidiary of BHP. Between 1987 and 1999 it was rebranded several times to Lysaght Building Industries, Lysaght Building Products, BHP Building Products, and BHP Steel Lysaght.

In 2002 BHP Steel was listed on the Australian Securities Exchange, later being rebranded BlueScope. Lysaght was again rebranded as BlueScope Lysaght. In 2013 it resumed trading as Lysaght.

== See also ==
- List of oldest companies in Australia
