= KAL1 general purpose infantry rifle =

Australian bullpup rifle

- Type: Bullpup battle rifle
- Place of origin: Australia

Production history
- Designer: Kevin Loughrey; Andrew Witt
- Designed: 1970–1973
- Manufacturer: Small Arms Factory Lithgow
- No. built: 1 (working 'mockup'); 1 (unfinished prototype)
- Variants: KAL1(A); KAL1(B)

Specifications
- Mass: 3.98 kg
- Length: 856 mm
- Barrel length: Same as L1A1 SLR
- Cartridge: 7.62×51mm NATO
- Caliber: 7.62mm
- Action: Gas-operated, tilting breechblock
- Feed system: 20-round detachable box magazine
- Sights: Iron sights

The KAL1 general purpose infantry rifle (KAL1 GPIR) was an Australian bullpup rifle designed in the 1970s for jungle warfare following complaints about the weight and length of the L1A1 SLR rifles then in service with the Australian Army. The design never entered service, with the bullpup configured, optically sighted 5.56 mm F-88 Austeyr selected instead in 1989.

== See also ==
- List of bullpup firearms
- List of battle rifles
