= Lithgow Arms =

Australian arms manufacturer

- Industry: Firearms
- Founded: 8 June 1912; 114 years ago
- Headquarters: Lithgow, New South Wales, Australia
- Products: Pistols, Rifles, Carbines, Submachine guns, Machine guns, Handcuffs
- Parent: Thales Australia
- Website: www.lithgowarms.com

Lithgow Arms is an Australian small arms manufacturer located in the town of Lithgow, New South Wales. Established by the Australian Government in 1912 as the Lithgow Small Arms Factory to ease reliance on the British for the supply of defence materials, it is currently owned by Thales Australia.

== History ==
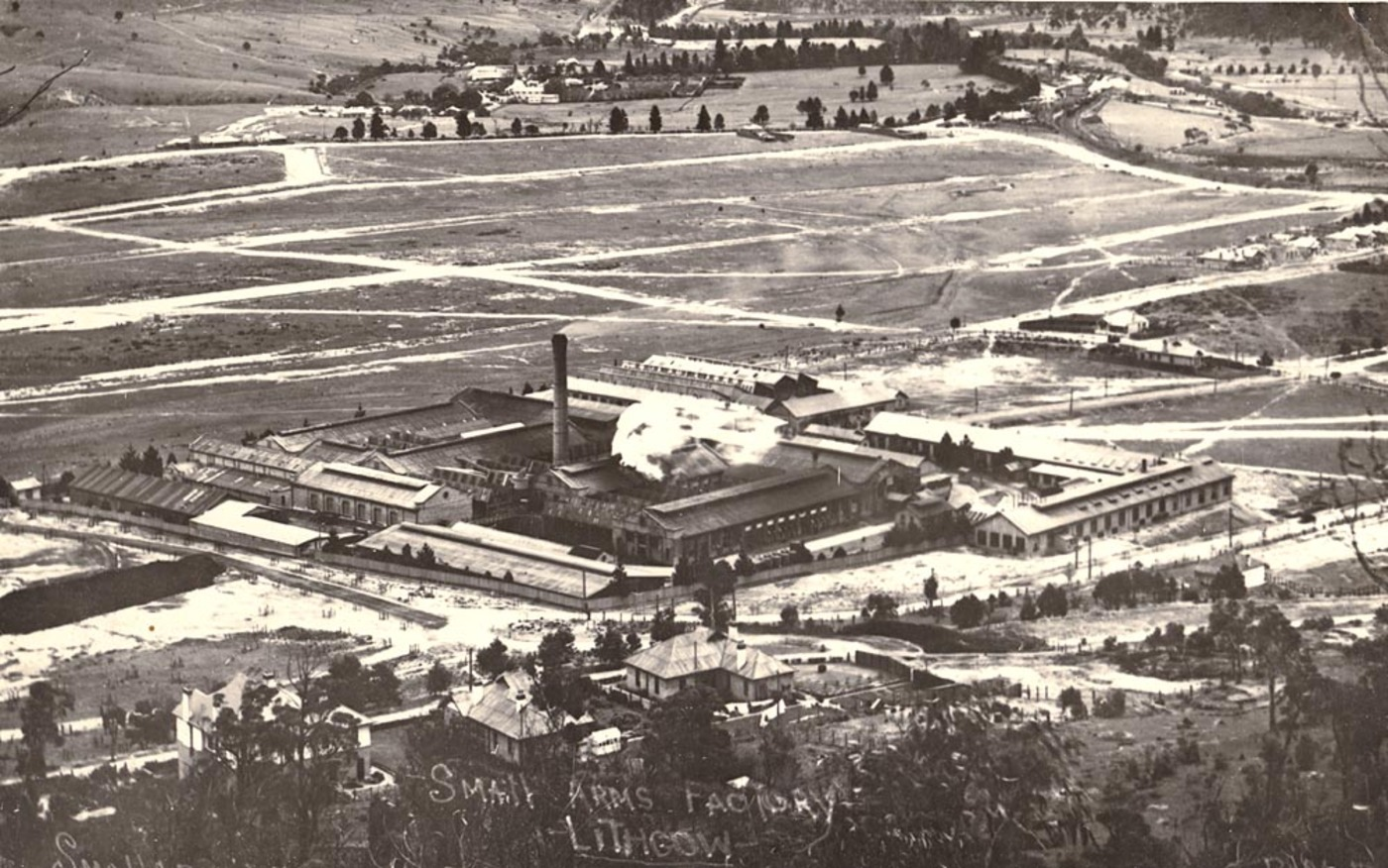
Lithgow Small Arms Factory in 1910s~1920s

Opened on 8 June 1912, the factory initially manufactured SMLE III rifles (and Pattern 1907 bayonets) for the Australian military during World War I. During World War II, production expanded to include Vickers machine guns, Bren guns and, postwar, branched out into sporting goods (including civilian firearms and golf clubs), tools, sewing machines, (from the mid-1950s) the F1 submachine gun, L1A1 SLR, KAL1 general purpose infantry rifle prototypes, general purpose machine guns, and similar products.

The Lithgow Small Arms Factory was known to produce their single shot models 1A and 1B as well as their Model 12 repeater under the Slazenger brand during the 1960s. The factory was first "corporatised" as Australian Defence Industries by the Hawke government, then later sold in 2006. ADI Lithgow is now owned by Thales Australia and continues to manufacture the EF88 Austeyr rifle and F89 Minimi currently used by the Australian military.

As a separate entity, not owned or run by the current owners of the factory, the volunteer-run Lithgow Small Arms Factory Museum is located at the front of the disused section of site and has a large collection of military and civilian firearms manufactured at the factory and elsewhere. In 2019, the museum was placed on the UNESCO Australian Memory of the World Register which lists influential collections and documents considered key to Australia's history. The museum sees 9,000 annual visitors and is a big draw to the city of Lithgow.

== Products ==
=== Military ===
Alongside the weapons listed below, the factory also produced bayonets, components, barrels, and magazines as well as repairing, modifying, and rechambering weapons.

- Short Magazine Lee Enfield, at least 640,000 produced, with variants including Rifle No 1 Mk III & Mk III* and Rifle No 2 Mk IV (training), from 1912 to 1945.
- Vickers machine gun, 12,500 Mk I, Mk V, and Mk XXI produced from 1929 to 1943.
- Bren light machine gun, 17,500 produced from 1940 to 1945.
- L1A1 Self Loading Rifle, 222,773 rifles produced from 1959 to 1986
- L2A1, 9,557 produced
- L1A1-F1, 460 produced
- F1 submachine gun, 25,000 produced from 1962 to 1973
- Austeyr F88, produced from 1988
- Minimi F89, produced from 1989
- Australian Combat Assault Rifle (ACAR), produced from 2023 (since 2026 in use with the New South Wales Police Force Armed Response Command)

=== Commercial ===
A broad variety of weapons complemented the factory's military production, but also civilian products such as aircraft parts, golf heads, and tractor components, amongst other things.

Discontinued firearms:

- Lithgow Model 1 .22 single-shot rifle produced from 1945
- Lithgow Model 1A .22 single-shot rifle
- Lithgow Model 1B .22 single-shot rifle
- Lithgow Model 12 .22 bolt-action 5-shot repeater produced from 1947
- Lithgow Model 12 .22 bolt-action 10-shot repeater (Bibby)
- Lithgow Model 24 .22 Hornet cartridge produced from 1949
- A single-shot bolt-action shotgun using the .410" cartridge (name unknown)

Current production firearms:

- Lithgow LA101 CrossOver bolt-action rimfire rifle, available in .17 HMR, .22 LR and .22 WMR
- Lithgow LA102 CrossOver bolt-action centerfire rifle, available in .223 Rem, .243 Win, 6.5mm Creedmoor and .308 Win.204 Ruger
- Lithgow LA105 Woomera bolt-action centerfire rifle, available in 6.5mm Creedmoor and .308 Win
- Lithgow F90 Semi Auto/Automatic Military Grade Rifle, available in 5.56×45mm NATO
  - Lithgow F90MBR Modular Bullpup Rifle, available in 5.56×45mm NATO
