= Lithgow Small Arms Factory Museum =

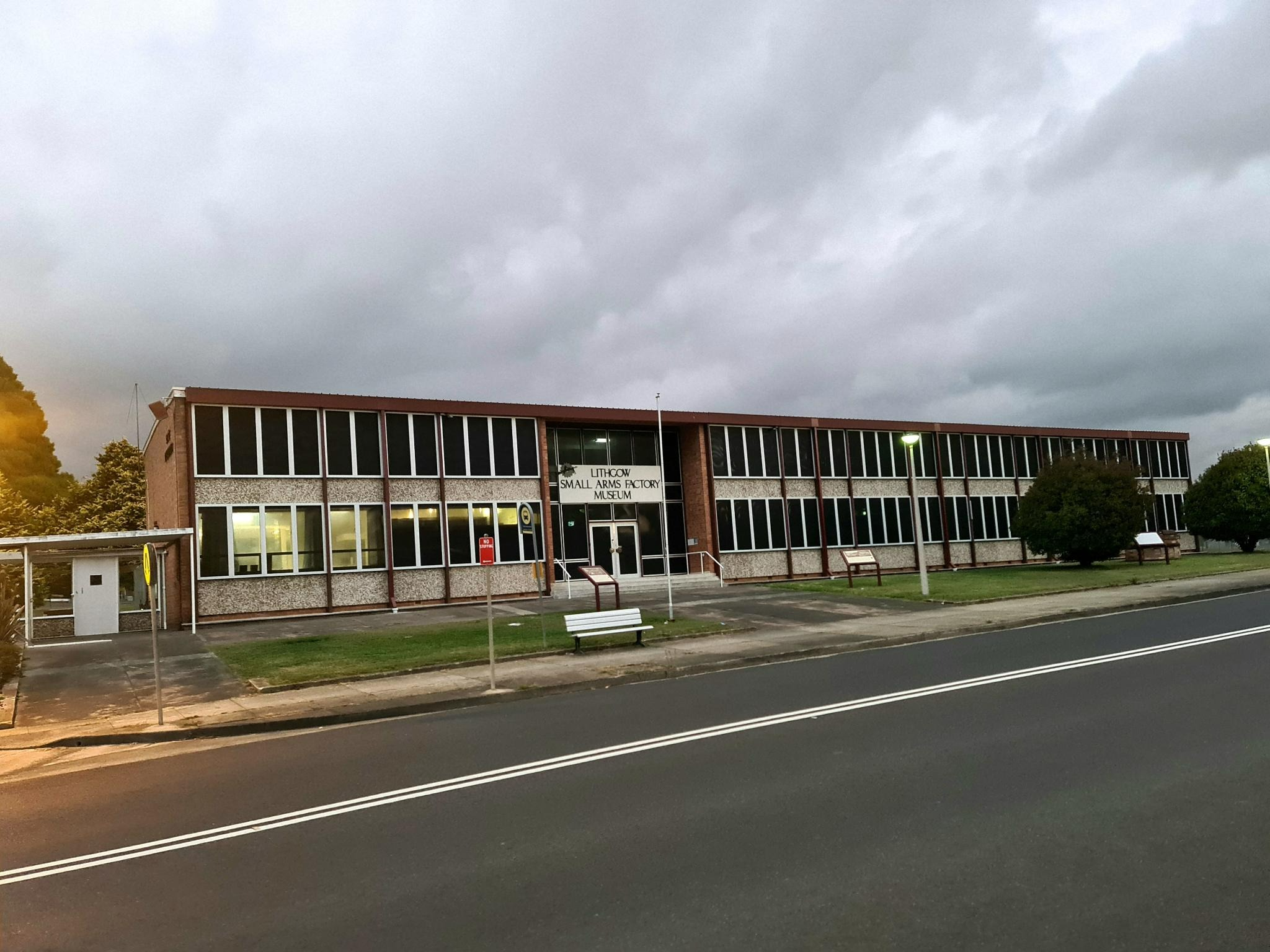
- Established: October 15, 1998
- Location: Lithgow, NSW
- Coordinates: 33.48757°S 150.14192°E
- Type: Industrial museum
- Website: www.lithgowsafmuseum.org.au

The Lithgow Small Arms Factory Museum is an industrial museum in Lithgow, New South Wales. It is located on the original Commonwealth Small Arms Factory site and houses archives dating back to the founding of the factory in 1912, as well as a large number of historical small arms and artefacts related to the operation of the original Lithgow Small Arms Factory. It was officially opened on the 15th of October 1998, after a number of former employees of the Lithgow Small Arms Factory objected to the privatisation of the former Factory property. It is not associated with Thales, the company currently operating the Lithgow Small Arms Factory, but is a community-owned museum standing on the original factory grounds which is operated entirely by volunteers.
