= F1 submachine gun =

F1
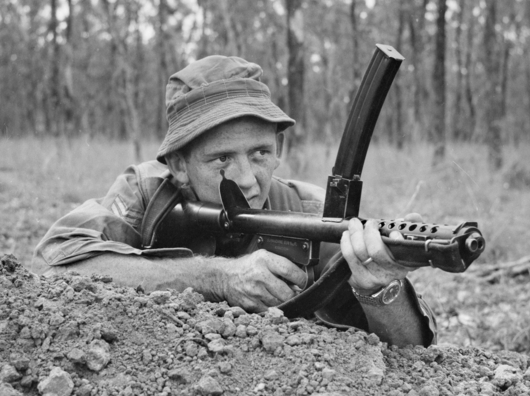
- An Australian soldier with an F1 submachine gun during a training exercise in 1967
- Type: Submachine gun
- Place of origin: Australia

Service history
- In service: 1963–1991
- Used by: See Users
- Wars: Vietnam War; Sino-Vietnamese War

Production history
- Designed: 1962
- Manufacturer: Lithgow Small Arms Factory
- Produced: 1963–1973
- No. built: 25,136

Specifications
- Mass: 3.7 kg (Empty); 4.30 kg (Loaded)
- Length: 714 mm
- Barrel length: 198 mm
- Cartridge: 9×19mm Parabellum
- Caliber: 9 mm
- Action: Blowback, Open bolt
- Rate of fire: 600–640 rounds/min
- Effective firing range: 150 m
- Maximum firing range: 100–200 m
- Feed system: 34-round Sterling SMG compatible box magazine
- Sights: Offset iron sights

The F1 is a 9×19mm Australian submachine gun manufactured by the Lithgow Small Arms Factory. First issued to Australian troops in July 1963, it replaced the Owen machine carbine.

Like the Owen, the F1 had a distinctive top mounted magazine. It had a robust and simple design, but "never gained popularity with those using it" and in Vietnam it was later largely replaced by the US-made M16A1 rifle. The F1 was retired in the early 1990s and replaced by the F88C Austeyr, an Australian-built version of the Steyr AUG rifle.

Some 25,000 were produced by Lithgow from 1962 to 1973. While the F1 is no longer used by Australia, a shipment of F1s was also donated to the Royal Papua New Guinea Constabulary by Australia.

== Design details ==
The F1 is a simple blowback design firing from an open bolt with a fixed firing pin. It was designated the X3 while under development.

It shares many design features with the British Sterling submachine gun. Unlike both the Sterling and its predecessor, the Owen, the F1 has a removable wooden butt and pistol grip. A curved, detachable 34-round box magazine is inserted in a magazine housing on top of the barrel, similar to the earlier Owen gun. It used the same magazine as the Sterling. The top-mounted magazine is unobtrusive for carrying and when lying prone; it also benefits from being less likely to jam than a bottom mounted magazine. The ejection port is directly under the magazine and provides a trap for the unwary user; should the user's hand stray back to the port, the bolt moving forwards will 'bite' the web of the hand. The butt-plate and pistol-grip are identical to those on the L1A1 SLR as well as the capability of adapting SLR bayonets. However, it was mostly used with a detachable bayonet fitted on the right side of the barrel jacket.

The trigger is a two-stage pull, half back semi auto, pull and hold back gives full auto requiring a safety catch only easily operated by the thumb. There is a small guard fitted forward of the ejection port to protect the forward hand. The left-mounted cocking handle does not have a "tab" on it. The cocking handle latches into the bolt that allows it to be worked forwards and backwards to clear fouling. The pistol grip with internal parts came from the production line of the SLR L1A1 rifle, at the Lithgow factory. The wooden butt also was from the SLR production line, reducing the amount of tooling.

Because of the vertical magazine the sights of the F1 were offset to the right of the weapon requiring a slight head tilt to the right, the rear sight being a roughly triangular asymmetrical metal flap with a round aperture, the front sight being a blade mounted on the right side of the weapon's magazine well.

Although the F1 retained many of the Owen's features it did not continue to have a separate compartment inside the receiver, isolating the small-diameter bolt from its retracting handle, so it was no longer as resistant to jamming if dropped in mud. This is considered a major disadvantage in comparison to the Owen gun it replaced. That being said, the non-reciprocating charging handle blocks off the slot in the side of the receiver to prevent the ingress of dirt.

== Users ==
- Australia
- Malaysia: Formerly used by the Royal Malaysian Police, now on display at the Police Museum.
- Papua New Guinea

== Accessories ==
The Complete Equipment Schedule (CES) for the F1 included:

- a large round wire and nylon brush, similar to a bottle brush for cleaning the tubular body of the weapon
- a standard SLR pull-through (a string with two loops in it. Centre one is used for holding a piece of service flannelette, the rear one is used to extract the pullthrough in case it gets stuck. It has a weight at the other to assist the user in feeding it down the barrel from the breech)
- a sling similar to the standard brass and canvas SLR sling, but shorter
- a detachable bayonet
- 5 magazines and
- a 4 magazine pouch, each pocket having its own flap.
- There was also an 8 magazine pouch
- In some units, the CES included the 8-magazine pouch and 9 magazines, instead of 5,

== General and cited references ==
- Australian Service Machine Guns (Skennerton)
- S.A.I.S No.3, 9mm Owen & Austen MK I* (Skennerton)
- Various Factory Records, S.A.F. Lithgow
- Infantry Training Vol. 1, Infantry Platoon Weapons Pam.
