= Owen gun =

Austtralian submachine gun

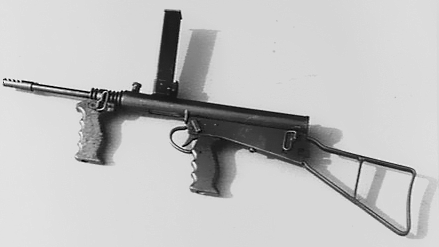
- Photograph of the Owen gun, 1942
- Type: Submachine gun
- Place of origin: Australia

Service history
- In service: 1942–1971
- Used by: See Users
- Wars: World War II; Indonesian National Revolution; Malayan Emergency; Korean War; Vietnam War; Laotian Civil War; Indonesia–Malaysia confrontation; Sino-Vietnamese War; Rhodesian Bush War

Production history
- Designer: Private Evelyn Owen
- Designed: 1931–1938
- Manufacturer: Lysaght’s Works
- Produced: 1942–1944
- No. built: 45,000

Specifications
- Mass: 4.23 kg (9.33 lb) without magazine 4.86 kg (10.7 lb) loaded
- Length: 813 mm (32.0 in)
- Barrel length: 250 mm (9.84 in)
- Cartridge: 9×19mm Parabellum
- Action: Blowback, open bolt
- Rate of fire: 700 rounds/min
- Muzzle velocity: 366 m/s (1,200 ft/s)
- Effective firing range: 123 metres (135 yd)
- Maximum firing range: 200 metres (220 yd)
- Feed system: 33-round detachable magazine
- Sights: Iron sights

The Owen gun, known officially as the Owen machine carbine, was an Australian submachine gun that was designed by Evelyn Owen in 1938. The Owen was the only entirely Australian-designed and constructed service submachine gun of World War II. It was used by the Australian Army from 1942 until 1971.

== History ==
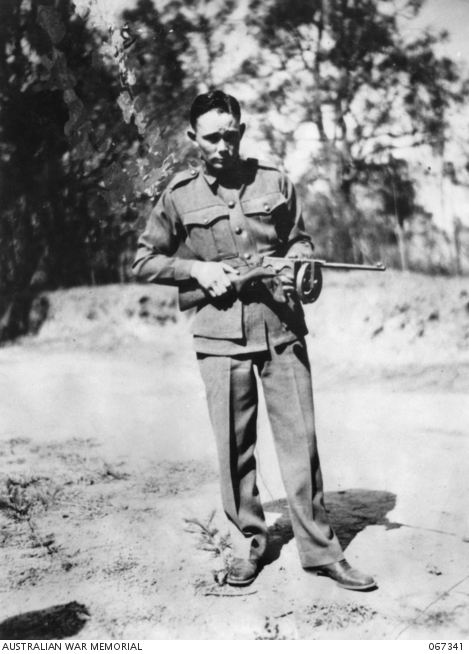
Photograph of Evelyn Owen

The Owen gun was created by Australian Army private Evelyn Owen in 1931, who finalised the design in 1938, when he was around 23 years old. Owen submitted the design to the Australian military but was rejected, as they were waiting for the British Sten to finish development. By May 1940, Owen had enlisted in the Second Australian Imperial Force, and was set to deploy to the Middle East, but after speaking about his design to the manager of a local plant of Lysaght, who had an interest in the design, Owen was transferred to the Central Inventions Board. In June 1941, Owen was discharged from the army and began to manufacture the Owen gun. After conducting tests in September that year, the Owen was found to be more accurate and reliable than competing designs such as the Sten and Thompson.

=== Production and use ===
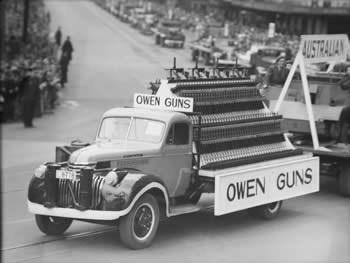
Owen guns on a truck during a Christmas parade in Sydney, 1942

The Owen went into production at the John Lysaght factories at Port Kembla and Newcastle. Between March 1942 and February 1943, Lysaght's produced 28,000 Owen guns. However, the initial batch of ammunition turned out to be the wrong type and 10,000 guns could not be supplied with ammunition. Once again the government overrode military bureaucracy, and took the ammunition through the final production stages and into the hands of Australian troops, at that time fighting Japanese forces in New Guinea. Approximately 45,000 Owens were produced from 1942 to 1944. Contemporary sources vary as to the cost of production during wartime, with some suggesting that the basic cost was as little as A£8 (US$24); a 1945 issue of Popular Mechanics claimed that the Owen cost US$30 (A£12).

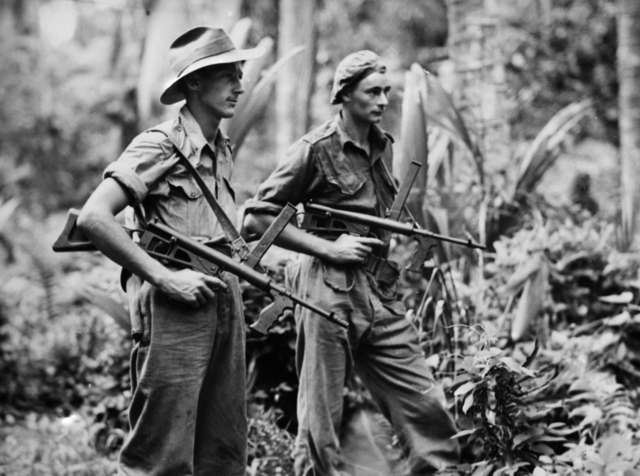
Australian soldiers armed with Owen guns in New Britain, April 1945

The Owen gun proved popular with soldiers in the Pacific. New Zealanders fighting in the Guadalcanal and Solomon Islands campaigns swapped their Thompsons for Owens, as they found Owens to be more reliable. During the gun's life, its reliability earned it the nickname "Digger's Darling" by Australian troops, and many of the Australian soldiers who had used the Owen came back to personally thank the Lysaght team (as they believed the Owen had saved their lives). General Douglas MacArthur considered equipping American troops in the Pacific with the Owen.

The Owen was later used by Australian troops in the Korean and Vietnam Wars, particularly the scouts in infantry sections. It remained a standard weapon of the Australian Army until 1971, when it was replaced by the F1 submachine gun and, later, the M16.

== Design ==
The Owen has a simple blowback design, firing from an open bolt. It was designed to be fired either from the shoulder or the hip. It is easily recognisable, owing to its unconventional appearance, including the top-mounted magazine, and the side-mounted sight required to allow the shooter to aim past it. The placement of the magazine allows gravity to assist the magazine spring in pushing cartridges down to the breech, which improves feeding reliability. Another unusual feature is the separate compartment inside the receiver, which isolates the small-diameter bolt from its retracting handle by means of a small bulkhead. This prevents dirt and mud from jamming the bolt, and makes the Owen a highly reliable weapon. The top-mounted magazine meant that if mud entered the weapon, it would either fall out on its own, or be pushed out by the magazine spring. When tested, the Owen gun was able to continue firing despite being dipped in mud and drenched with sand, while a Sten gun and a Thompson (also tested) stopped functioning at once. In jungle warfare, where both mud and sand were frequent problems, the Owen gun was highly regarded by the soldiers.

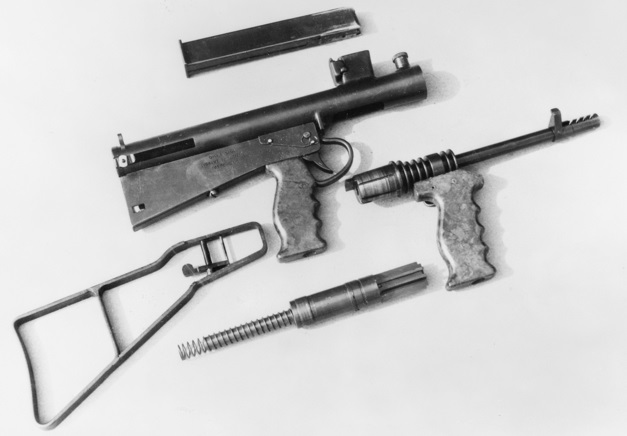
A field stripped Owen.

To facilitate cleaning, the ejector was built into the magazine port, rather than on the body of the gun. This allowed the barrel to be removed rapidly, by pulling up a spring-loaded plunger in front of the magazine housing. After removing the barrel, the bolt and return spring are removed in a forward direction, completely dismantling the gun. Like the Sten, the Owen had a non-folding wire buttstock, but also had pistol grips like the Austen.

Two horseshoe magazines were constructed in the field, holding 60 and 72 rounds. Little information exists as to the success of these experiments.

In 2004, an underground weapons factory was seized in Melbourne, Australia, yielding, among other things, three suppressed copies of the Owen submachine gun and parts to make six more. These had magazines inserted underneath rather than overhead, and were suspected of having been built for sale to local gangs involved in the illegal drug trade.

During Operation Ironside in 2021, an Owen submachine gun, magazines and ammunition suited for the firearm were found alongside a plastic fuel can containing petrol in a parkland on Gleeson Crescent at Rostrevor by STAR Group and Dog Operations Unit officers of the South Australia Police.

== Former users ==
- Australia
- Indonesia
- Laos
- Netherlands
- New Zealand
- Rhodesia
- United Kingdom

== Engineering heritage award ==
The gun received an Engineering Heritage National Marker from Engineers Australia as part of its Engineering Heritage Recognition Program.
