= L1A1 Self-Loading Rifle =

British version of the Belgian FN FAL battle rifle

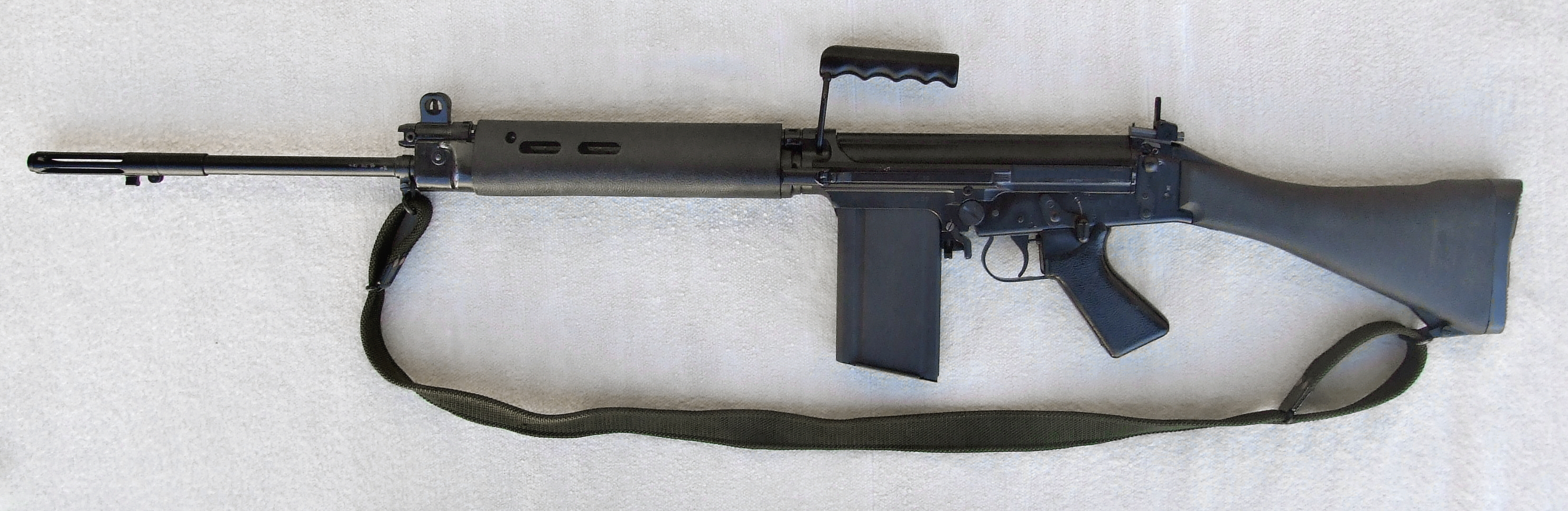
- A British L1A1 SLR
- Type: Semi-automatic rifle; Automatic rifle/light machine gun (L2A1/C2); Battle rifle (Ishapore 1A/1C)
- Place of origin: Belgium, Canada, United Kingdom

Service history
- In service: 1953–1989 (Canada); 1954–1994 (UK); 1954–present (Other countries)
- Used by: Commonwealth (See Users)
- Wars: See Conflicts

Production history
- Designer: Dieudonné Saive; Ernest Vervier
- Designed: 1947–1953
- Manufacturer: Royal Small Arms Factory; Birmingham Small Arms Company; Canadian Arsenals Limited; Lithgow Small Arms Factory; Ordnance Factory Board; ROF Fazakerley
- Produced: 1954–1986
- Variants: L1A1/C1/C1A1 (Rifles); L2A1/C2/C2A1 (Squad automatic weapons)

Specifications
- Mass: 4.337 kg (9.56 lb) empty
- Length: 1,143 mm (3 ft 9.0 in)
- Barrel length: 554.4 mm (21.83 in)
- Cartridge: 7.62×51mm NATO
- Action: Gas-operated, tilting breechblock
- Rate of fire: 675–750 rounds/min (L2A1/C2)
- Muzzle velocity: 823 m/s (2,700 ft/s)
- Effective firing range: 800 m (870 yd)
- Feed system: 20- or 30-round detachable box magazine
- Sights: Aperture rear sight, post front sight

The L1A1 Self-Loading Rifle (SLR), also known by the initial Canadian designation C1, or in the U.S. as the "inch pattern" FAL (from French: Fusil Automatique Léger), is a British version of the Belgian FN FAL battle rifle. The L1A1 was produced under licence and adopted by the armed forces of the Commonwealth of Nations, mainly by United Kingdom, Australia, Canada, India, Jamaica, Malaysia, New Zealand, Rhodesia and Singapore.

The L1A1 is manufactured to a slightly modified design using British imperial units, not the metric units of the original Belgian FAL. Many sub-assemblies are interchangeable between the two types, while components of those sub-assemblies may not be compatible. Notable incompatibilities include the magazine and the stock.

Most Commonwealth-pattern FALs are considered semi-automatic only, but they are not. On the L1A1s, the safety lever with a single cut, trigger overtravel pin, auto-sear, spring and connector were replaced with parts that prevented the L1A1 from firing until the bolt was fully locked. The receiver was machined to the same dimensions as a select-fire FAL, and if the auto-sear and parts are installed as they are in an FAL, the L1A1 will function as a select-fire weapon. A variant named L2A1/C2A1 (C2), meant to serve as an automatic rifle/light machine gun in a support role, was made capable of fully automatic fire from the manufacturer. Differences from the L1A1/C1 include a heavy barrel, squared front sight (versus the "V" on the semi-automatic models), a handguard that doubles as a foldable bipod, and a larger 30-round magazine although it could also use the normal 20-round magazines. Only Canada and Australia used this variant. Australia, New Zealand, and the United Kingdom used the Bren light machine guns converted to fire the 7.62×51mm NATO cartridge for use in the support role. Canadian C1s issued to naval vessels for boarding party usage were also capable of fully automatic fire.

== History ==
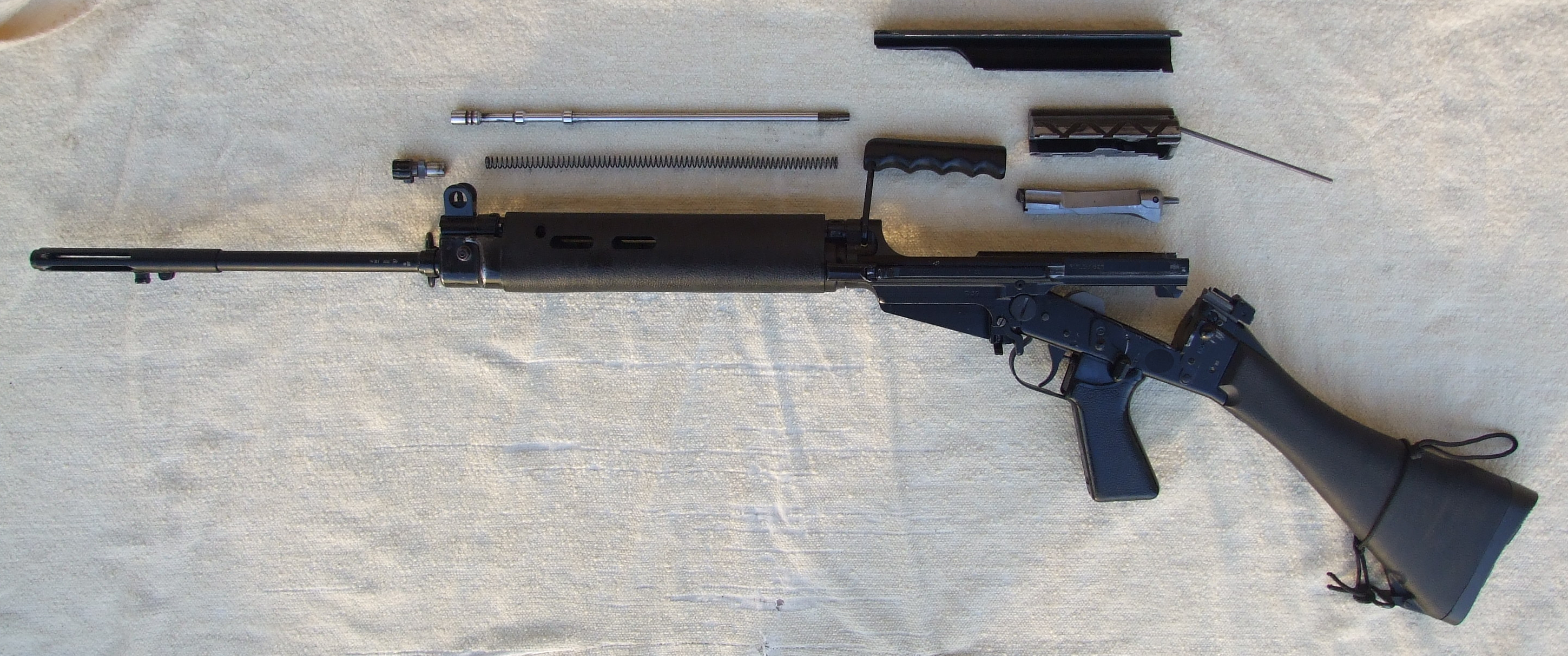
A British L1A1 field stripped

The L1A1 and other inch-pattern derivatives trace their lineage back to the Allied Rifle Commission of the 1950s, whose intention was to introduce a single rifle and cartridge that would serve as standard issue for all NATO countries. They originally adopted the Rifle No. 9 Mk 1 chambered for a 7mm intermediate cartridge. To meet this plan and strengthen ties with the United States, the United Kingdom soon dropped the No.9 rifle in favor of the Belgian FAL chambered for the newly proposed American 7.62×51mm cartridge. Based on Canada's experiments with the FAL that led to the C1A1, the United Kingdom and Australia adopted the L1A1 (or Self-Loading Rifle) as their new service rifle in 1954.

NATO standardized on the 7.62mm NATO cartridge in 1954, but did not adopt a standard rifle. Most adopted a native design chambered for 7.62mm NATO, with Germany eventually adopting the G3 and the United States adopting the M14. Even the C1A1 and L1A1 used inch measurements and were not interchangeable with the FAL's metric parts. France's participation was to adopt a natively-designed service rifle that used their national 7.5mm MAS rifle cartridge.

The British experimental version of the FAL (designated the X-1) initially used an 8-round "horseshoe charger" (a U-shaped clip that held the cartridges) that was based on an experimental 10-round Belgian design. The operator would open the bolt and place the charger into guide rails over the chamber. The rounds would then be slid down into the detachable box magazine through the bolt. The 8-round horseshoe charger was replaced in trials with a 5-round model due to problems with them becoming damaged when packed in pouches or bandoliers. The 5-round horseshoe charger had similar problems and was replaced with a conventional straight 5-round charger.

The L1A1 subsequently served as the UK's first-line battle rifle up to the 1980s before being replaced by the 5.56mm L85A1.

=== Combat service ===
The L1A1 and variants have seen use in several conflicts, including as part of the Cold War. L1A1s have been used by the British Armed Forces in Malaysia, Northern Ireland, and in the Falklands War (in opposition to FN FAL-armed Argentine forces), the First Gulf War (where it was still on issue to some second line British Army units and RAF personnel not yet issued with the L85A1), and by the Kuwait Army during the First Gulf War.

It was used by Australia and New Zealand in Vietnam, by the Indian Army in the 1965 and 1971 Indo-Pak wars and by various paramilitary and state police forces in counter insurgency operations up to the early 1990s, by Nigerian and Biafran forces during Nigerian Civil War and by Rhodesia in the Rhodesian Bush War.

=== Replacement ===
Starting in the mid-1980s, the United Kingdom started replacing its 30-year-old L1A1 rifle with the 5.56 NATO bullpup design L85A1 assault rifle. Australia chose the Steyr AUG as a replacement in the form of the F88 Austeyr, with New Zealand following suit shortly after. Canada replaced its C1 rifle with AR-15 variants, such as the C7 service rifle and C8 carbine.

Australia replaced its L2A1 heavy barrel support weapons with M60s and later with an FN Minimi variant: the F89. Canada replaced its C2 heavy barrel support weapons with an FN Minimi variant: the C9, respectively.

== Production and use ==
=== Australia ===
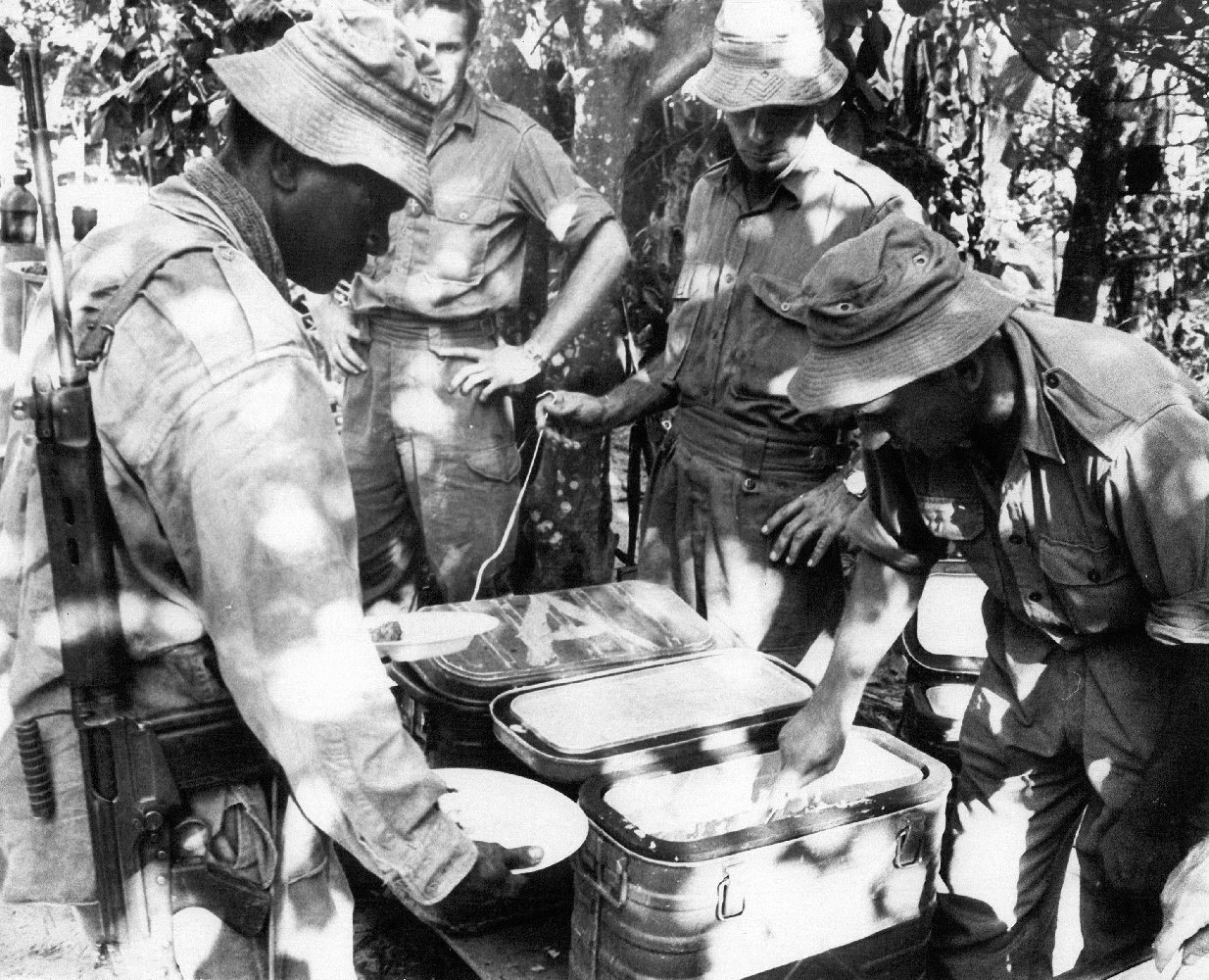
Australian soldier with an L1A1, near the fighting zone of Operation Crimp, Vietnam

The Australian Army, as a late member of the Allied Rifle Committee along with the United Kingdom and Canada adopted the committee's improved version of the FAL rifle, designated the L1A1 rifle by Australia and Great Britain, and C1 by Canada. The Australian L1A1 is also known as the "self-loading rifle" (SLR), and in fully automatic form, the "automatic rifle". The Australian L1A1 features are almost identical to the British L1A1 version of FAL. The Australian L1A1 differs from its British counterpart in the design of the upper receiver lightening cuts. The lightening cuts of the Australian L1A1 most closely resembles the later Canadian C1 pattern, rather than the simplified and markedly unique British L1A1 cuts.

The Australian L1A1 FAL rifle was in service with Australian forces until it was superseded by the F88 Austeyr, a licence-built version of the Steyr AUG, in 1988. Some remained in service with Reserve and training units until late 1990. Some Australian Army units deployed overseas on UN peacekeeping operations in Namibia, the Western Sahara, and Cambodia still used the L1A1 SLR and the M16A1 rifle throughout the early 1990s. The British and Australian L1A1s, and Canadian C1A1 SLRs were semi-automatic only, unless battlefield conditions mandated that modifications be made.

Australia, in co-ordination with Canada, developed a heavy-barrel version of the L1A1 as a fully automatic rifle variant, designated L2A1. The Australian heavy-barrel L2A1 was also known as the "automatic rifle" (AR). The L2A1 was similar to the FN FAL 50.41/42, but with a unique combined bipod-handguard and a receiver dust-cover mounted tangent rear sight from Canada. The L2A1 was intended to serve a role as a light fully automatic rifle or quasi-squad automatic weapon (SAW). The role of the L2A1 and other heavy barrel FAL variants is essentially the same in concept as the Browning Automatic Rifle (BAR) or Bren, but the Bren was better suited to the role of a fire support base for a section, being designed for the role from the start.

In practice many considered the L2A1 inferior to the Bren, as the Bren had a barrel that could be changed, and so could deliver a better continuous rate of fire, and was more accurate and controllable in the role due to its greater weight and better stock configuration. For this reason, Australia and Britain used the 7.62mm-converted L4 series Bren. Most countries that adopted the FAL rejected the heavy barrel FAL, presumably because it did not perform well in the machine gun role. Countries that embraced the heavy barrel FAL included Argentina, Australia, Belgium, Canada, and Israel.

Unique 30-round magazines were developed for the L2A1 rifles. These 30-round magazines were essentially lengthened versions of the standard 20-round L1A1 magazines, perfectly straight in design. Curved 30-round magazines from the L4A1 7.62 NATO conversion of the Bren are interchangeable with the 30-round L2A1 magazines; however, they reputedly gave feeding difficulties due to the additional friction from the curved design as they must be inserted "upside down" in the L2A1. The L4A1 Bren magazines were developed as a top-mounted gravity-assisted feed magazine, the opposite of what is required for the L2A1 FAL. This was sometimes rectified by stretching magazine springs.

The Australian L1A1/L2A1 rifles were produced by the Lithgow Small Arms Factory, with approximately 220,000 L1A1 rifles produced between 1959 and 1986. L2A1 production was approximately 10,000 rifles produced between 1962 and 1982. Lithgow exported a large number of L1A1 rifles to many countries in the region. Among the users were New Zealand, Singapore and Papua New Guinea.

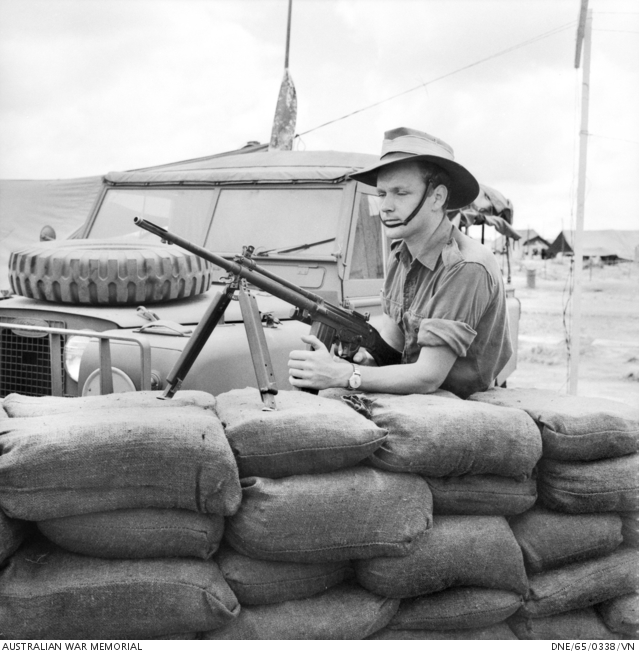
A sentry with an L2A1 at Bien Hoa Air Base, 1965

During the Vietnam War, the SLR was the standard weapon issued to Australian infantrymen. Most Australian soldiers preferred the larger calibre weapon over the American M16, because the SLR was substantially more reliable and its more powerful NATO 7.62 round could be trusted to kill an enemy soldier outright. The Australians' jungle warfare tactics used in Vietnam were refined by their experience in earlier jungle conflicts, e.g., the Malayan Emergency and the Konfrontasi campaign in Borneo, and were considered far more threatening by their Viet Cong opponents than those employed by U.S. forces. The Australians considered the strengths and limitations of the SLR and its heavy ammunition load to be better suited to actual combat.

Another product of Australian participation in the conflict in South-East Asia was the field modification of L1A1 and L2A1 rifles by the Special Air Service Regiment for better handling. Nicknamed "the Bitch", these rifles were field modified, often from heavy barrel L2A1 automatic rifles, with their barrels cut off right in front of the gas blocks, and often with the L2A1 bipods removed to install XM148 40 mm grenade launchers mounted below the barrels. The XM148 40 mm grenade launchers were obtained from U.S. forces. For the L1A1, the lack of fully automatic fire resulted in the unofficial conversion of the L1A1 to full-auto capability by using lower receivers from the L2A1, which works by restricting trigger movement.

Australia produced a shortened version of the L1A1 designated the L1A1-F1 for the Papua New Guinea Army, with fewer than 500 produced. The reduction in length was achieved by installing a shorter butt length and a shorter flash suppressor, reducing the length of the weapon by 2 1/4 inches.

In 1970, a bullpup rifle known as the KAL1 general purpose infantry rifle was built at the Small Arms Factory Lithgow using parts from the L1A1 rifle, but it never entered service.

=== Canada ===
Canada adopted the FAL in 1954, the first country in the world to actually ante up and order enough rifles for meaningful troop trials. Up to this point, FN had been making these rifles in small test lots of ones and twos, each embodying changes and improvements over its predecessor. The Canadian order for 2,000 rifles "cast the FAL in concrete" for the first time, and at FN, from 1954 to 1958 the standard model of the FAL rifle was called the FAL 'Canada' ... These excellent Canadian-built rifles were the standard arms of the Canadian military from first production in 1955 until 1984.

— R. Blake Stevens, The FAL Rifle

The Canadian Armed Forces, the Ontario Provincial Police and Royal Canadian Mounted Police operated several versions, the most common being the C1A1, similar to the British L1A1 (which became more or less a Commonwealth standard), the main differences being a rotating disc rear sight graduated from 200–600 yd (180–550 m) and a two-piece firing pin. Users could fold the trigger guard into the pistol grip, which allowed them to wear mitts when firing the weapon. The Canadian rifle also had a shorter receiver cover than other Commonwealth variants to allow for refilling the magazine by charging it with stripper clips.

It was manufactured under license by the Canadian Arsenals Limited company. Canada was the first country to use the FAL. It served as Canada's standard battle rifle from the early 1950s to 1984. It was eventually phased out in favor of the lighter Diemaco C7, a licence-built copy of the M16, with a number of features borrowed from the A1, A2, and A3 variations of the AR platform assault rifle.

Selective-fire variants of the initial C1 and the improved C1A1 version were made for the Royal Canadian Navy, under the designations C1D and C1A1D. These weapons are identifiable by an A for "automatic", carved or stamped into the butt stock. Boarding parties for domestic and international searches used the C1D.

The Canadians also operated a fully automatic variant - the C2A1 - as a section support weapon, which was almost identical to the Australian L2A1. It was similar to the FN FAL 50.41/42, but with wooden attachments to the bipod legs that served as a handguard when the legs are folded. The C2A1 used a tangent rear sight attached to the receiver cover with ranges from 200–1,000 m (660–3,280 ft). The C1 was equipped with a 20-round magazine and the C2 with a 30-round magazine, although the two were interchangeable.

The selective-fire C2A1 was produced to replace the Bren Gun for the Canadian Army. While a reliable and accurate weapon, the C2A1 was unpopular among Canadian soldiers due to its very limited sustained fire capability: the C2A1 lacked an interchangeable barrel, and its bottom-loading magazines were time-consuming to reload. Roughly 2,700 examples were produced. In the late 1980s the C2A1 was replaced by the FN Minimi in the Canadian Armed Forces, ending its military service.

=== India ===
The Rifle 7.62 mm 1A1, or the Ishapore 1A1, is a copy of the L1A1 self-loading rifle. It is produced at Ordnance Factory Tiruchirappalli of the Ordnance Factories Board. It differs from the UK SLR in that the wooden butt-stock uses the butt-plate from the Lee–Enfield with trap for oil bottle and cleaning pull-through, while copying some elements from metric FALs such as the bolt release. It is also known as the Ishapore Rifle since it was also made at Rifle Factory Ishapore. They can be equipped with the 1A and 1A Long Blade bayonet, based on the L1A4 bayonet.

A fully automatic version of the rifle (known as the 1C or Ishapore 1C) is also available, meant for use in BMP-2s via firing ports. It has full auto and semi auto modes. A muzzle is placed in the barrel in order to secure it on the firing ports.

Production started in 1960 after the Armament Research & Development Establishment (ARDE) evaluated several Australian, Belgian and British FAL rifles and each one was disassembled and examined. ARDE researchers began to make plans to make their own rifle after negotiations with FN were unsuccessful because of royalty requirements and the clause that Belgian technicians help manage the production lines. 750 rifles were made per week. FN threatened a lawsuit when they learnt of the unlicensed variant. Then Prime Minister Jawaharlal Nehru was not made aware of it and after he had heard it, offered to settle FN's complaints by agreeing to purchase additional Belgian-made FALs, FALOs and MAG 60.20 GPMGs. In 1998 onward, Ishapore 1A1, 1A and 1C were gradually withdrawn from service and replaced by the INSAS rifle. The Ishapore 1A1 and 1C is still in use by Central Armed Police Forces, some law enforcement bodies and also used during parades by the National Cadet Corps. In 2012, around 6,000 rifles were made annually in India. As of September 2019, around a million rifles had been made.

In 2018, it was reported that the 1A1 was sold to the Kerala State Police.

The 1A1 rifle has been replaced in service with the Indian Army by the INSAS.

=== New Zealand ===
The New Zealand Army used the L1A1 as its standard service rifle for just under 30 years. The Labour government of Walter Nash approved the purchase of the L1A1 as a replacement for the No. 4 Mk 1 Lee–Enfield bolt-action rifle in 1959. An order for 15,000 L1A1 rifles was placed with the Lithgow Small Arms Factory in Australia which had been granted a license to produce the L1A1. The first batch of 500 rifles were delivered to the New Zealand Army in 1960. Deliveries continued at an increasing pace until the order for all 15,000 rifles was completed in 1965. As with Australian soldiers, the L1A1 was the preferred rifle of New Zealand Army and NZSAS troops during the Vietnam War, over the American M16 during the Vietnam War, as they used the same combat tactics as their Australian counterparts. After its adoption by the Army, the Royal New Zealand Air Force and the Royal New Zealand Navy eventually acquired it.

Unlike L1A1s in Australian service, New Zealand L1A1s later used British black plastic furniture, and some rifles even had a mixture of the two. The carrying handles were frequently cut off. The British SUIT (Sight Unit Infantry Trilux) optical sight was issued to some users in infantry units. The L2A1 heavy barrel variant was also issued as a limited standard, but was not popular due to the problems also encountered by other users of heavy barrel FAL variants. The L4A1 7.62mm conversion of the Bren was much-preferred in New Zealand service.

The New Zealand Defence Force began replacing the L1A1 with the Steyr AUG assault rifle in 1988 and were disposed through the Government Disposal Bureau in 1990. The Steyr AUG was phased out across all three services of the New Zealand Defence Force from 2016. The Royal New Zealand Navy still uses the L1A1 for line throwing between ships.

=== United Kingdom ===
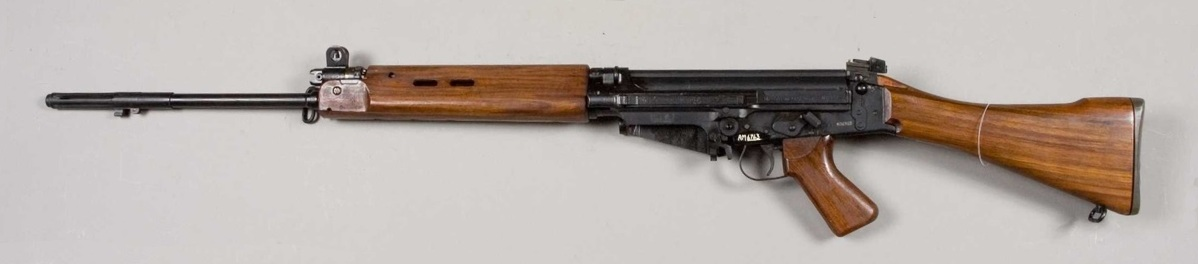
A BSA-built L1A1 in the Swedish Army Museum

The United Kingdom produced its own variant of the FN FAL incorporating the modifications developed by the Allied Rifle Committee, designating it the L1A1 Self Loading Rifle (SLR). The weapons were manufactured by the Royal Small Arms Factory Enfield, Birmingham Small Arms, Royal Ordnance Factory and ROF Fazakerley. After the production run ceased, replacement components were made by Parker-Hale Limited. The SLR served the British Armed Forces from 1954 until approximately 1994, being replaced by the L85A1 from 1985 onwards.

The SLR was designed using Imperial measurements and included several changes from the standard FN FAL. A significant change from the original FAL was that the L1A1 operates in semi-automatic mode only due to the auto-sear parts not being installed, but otherwise is a select-fire-built rifle. Other changes include: the introduction of a folding cocking handle; an enclosed slotted flash suppressor; folding rear sight; 'sand-cuts' modifications that provided space for limited sand or other dirt ingress into the upper receiver, bolt and bolt carrier; folding trigger guard to allow use with Arctic mitts; strengthened buttstock; enlarged change lever and magazine release catch; vertical stripping catch to prevent unintended activation; deletion of the automatic hold-open device and the addition of retaining tabs at the rear of the top cover to prevent forward movement of the top cover (and resulting loss of zero) when the L2A1 SUIT was fitted. The flash suppressor is fitted with a lug which allows the fitting of an L1-series bayonet, an L1A1/A2 or L6A1 blank firing attachment or an L1A1/A2 Energa rifle grenade launcher.

Initial production rifles were fitted with walnut furniture, consisting of the pistol grip, forward handguard, carrying handle and butt. The wood was treated with oil to protect against moisture, but not varnished or polished. Later production weapons were produced with synthetic furniture. The material used was Maranyl, a nylon 6-6 and fibreglass composite. The Maranyl parts have a "pebbled" anti-slip texture along with a butt has a separate butt-pad, available in four lengths to allow the rifle to be fitted to individual users.

There was a special short butt designed for use with Arctic clothing or body armour, which incorporated fixing points for an Arctic chest sling system. After the introduction of the Maranyl furniture, as extra supplies became available it was retrofitted to older rifles as they underwent scheduled maintenance. This resulted in a mixture of wooden and Maranyl furniture within units and often on the same rifle. Wooden furniture was still in use in some Territorial Army units and in limited numbers with the RAF until at least 1989.

The SLR selector has two settings (rather than the three that most metric FALs have), 'S' for safe and 'R' for repetition (semi-automatic). The magazine from the 7.62mm L4 light machine gun will fit the SLR. Commonwealth magazines were produced with a lug brazed onto the front to engage the recess in the receiver, in place of a smaller pressed dimple on the metric FAL magazine. As a consequence of this, metric FAL magazines can sometimes be used with the Commonwealth SLR if the fit happens to work out properly, but SLR magazines will not fit the metric FAL.

Despite the British, Australian and Canadian versions of the FAL being manufactured using machine tools which utilised the Imperial measurement system, they are all of the same basic dimensions. Parts incompatibilities between the original FAL and the L1A1 are due to pattern differences, not due to the different dimensions. Confusions over the differences has given rise to the terminology of "metric" and "inch" FAL rifles, which originated as a reference to the machine tools which produced them. Despite this, virtually all FAL rifles are of the same basic dimensions, true to the original Belgian FN FAL. In the US, the term "metric FAL" refers to guns of the Belgian FAL pattern, whereas "inch FAL" refers to ones produced to the Commonwealth L1A1/C1 pattern.

SLRs could be modified at unit level to take two additional sighting systems. The first was the "Hythe sight", formally known as the "Conversion Kit, 7.62mm Rifle Sight, Trilux, L5A1" (L5A2 and L5A3 variants with different foresight inserts also existed) and intended for use in close range and in poor lighting conditions. The sight incorporated two rear sight aperture leaves and a tritium illuminated foresight insert for improved night visibility, which had to be replaced after a period of time due to radioactive decay. The first rear sight leaf had a 7 mm (0.28 in) aperture which could be used alone for night shooting or the second leaf could be raised in front of it, superimposing a 2 mm (0.079 in) aperture for day shooting.

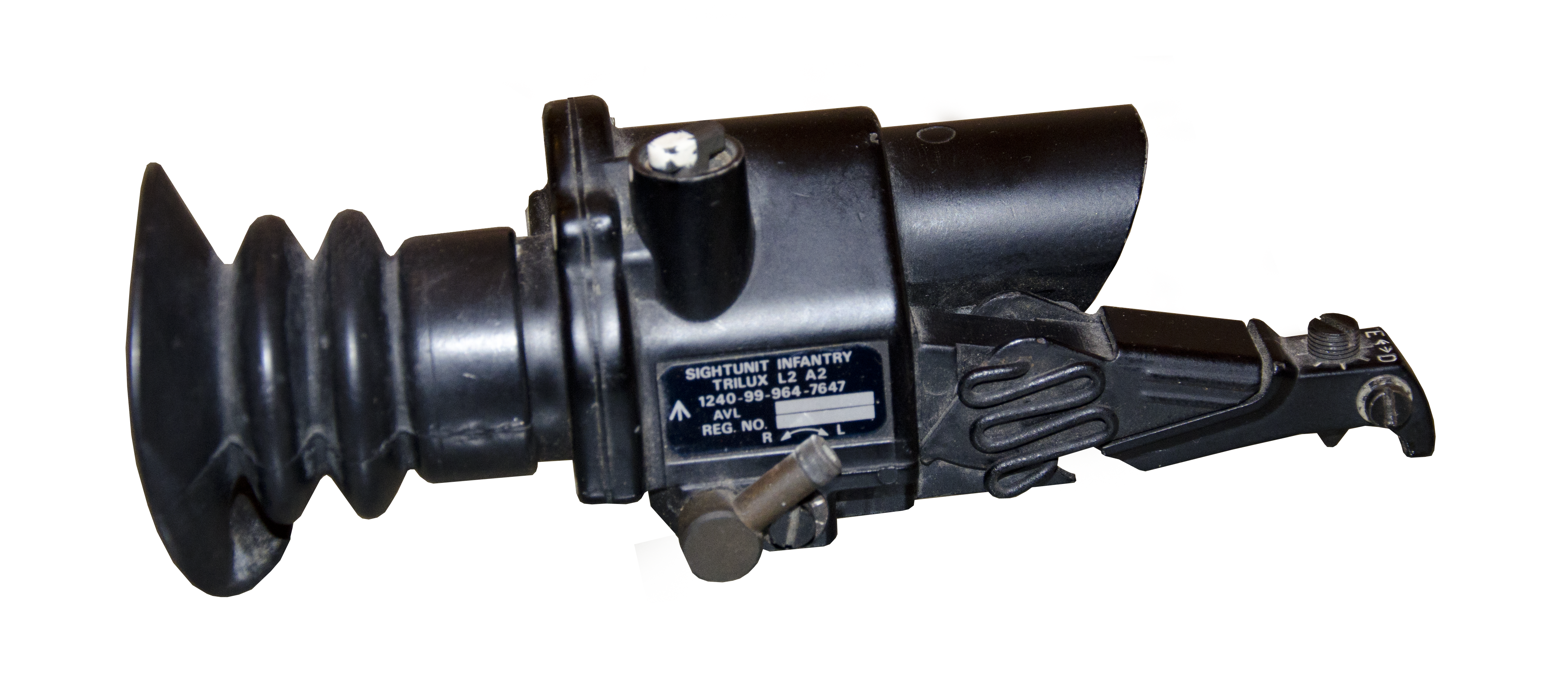
L2A2 SUIT Sight

The second sight was the L2A2 "Sight Unit, Infantry, Trilux" (SUIT), a 4× optical sight which mounted on a rail welded to a top cover. Issued to the British Infantry, Royal Marines and RAF Regiment, the SUIT featured a prismatic offset design, which reduced the length of the sight and improved clearance around the action. Also, the prismatic offset design helped to reduce parallax errors and heat mirage from the barrel as it heated up during firing. The aiming mark was an inverted, tapered perspex pillar ending in a point which could be illuminated by a tritium element for use in low light conditions. The inverted sight post allowed rapid target re-acquisition of the target after the recoil of the firearm raised the muzzle. The sight was somewhat heavy, but due to its solid construction was durable and robust. (Note: During the Cold War, the British SUIT was copied by the Soviet Union and designated the 1P29 telescopic sight.)

The SLR was officially replaced in 1985 by the bullpup design L85A1 service rifle, firing the 5.56×45mm NATO cartridge. The armed forces were re-equipped by 1994 and during this period the L1A1 rifles were gradually phased out. Most were either destroyed or sold, with some going to Sierra Leone. Several thousand were sent to the US and sold as parts kits, and others were refurbished by LuxDefTec in Luxembourg and are still on sale to the European market.

== Gallery ==
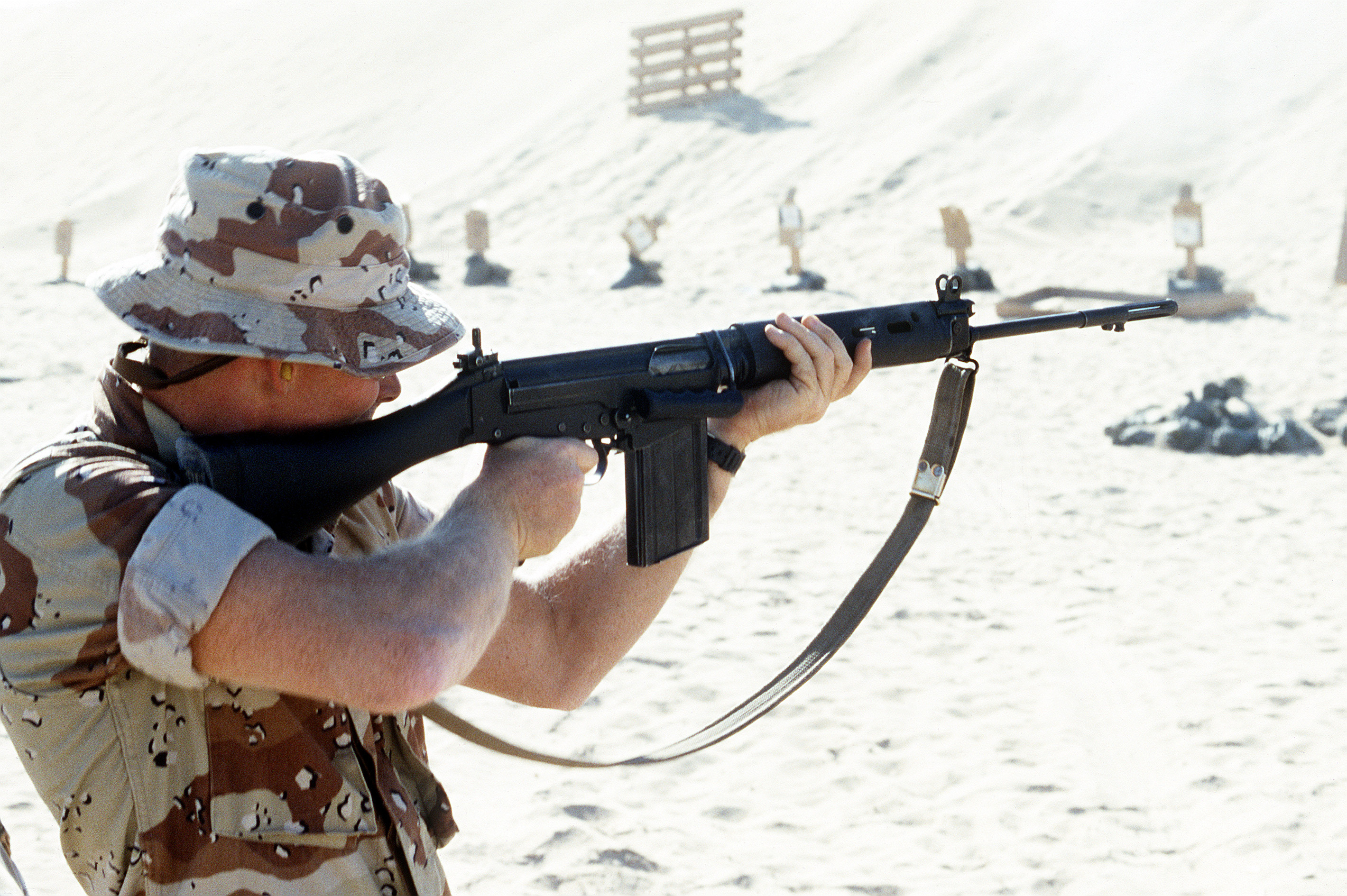
A United States Marine with a British L1A1 SLR, during a training exercise as part of the Gulf War's Operation Desert Shield

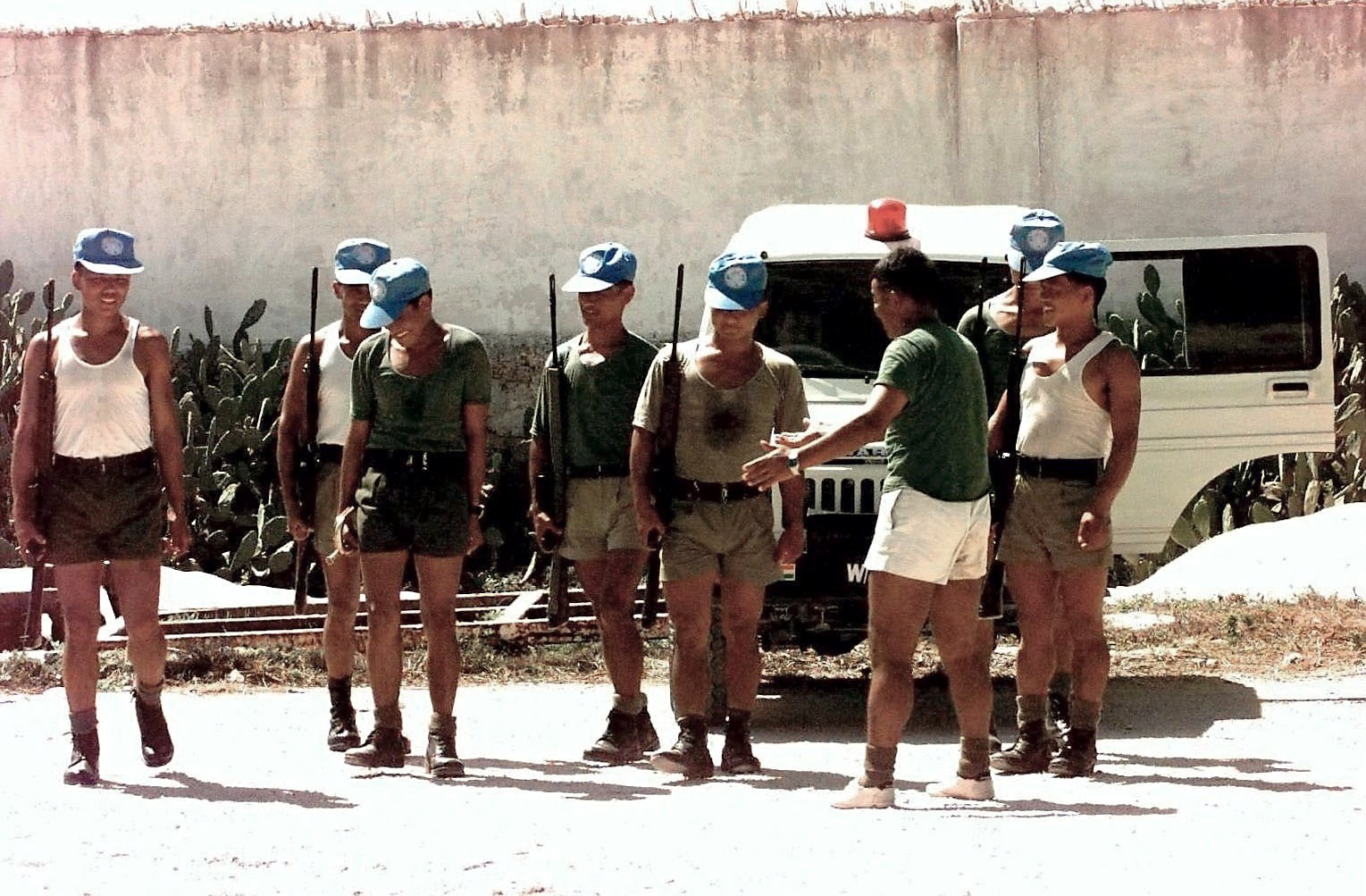
Malaysian soldiers with L1A1 rifles in their headquarters, near the airport in Mogadishu during Operation Restore Hope

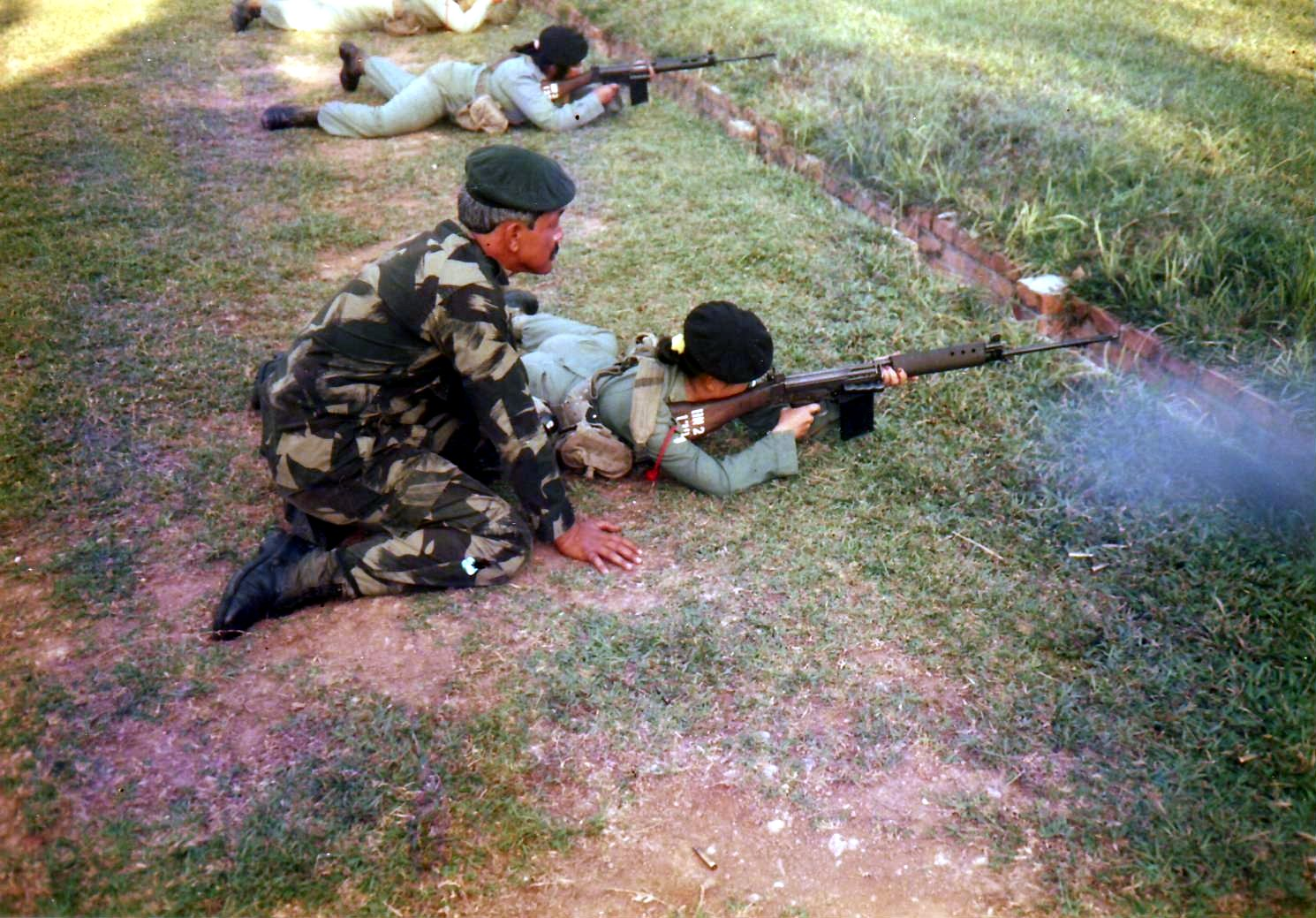
A female soldier of the Rejimen Askar Wataniah with an L1A1 SLR, circa 1990s

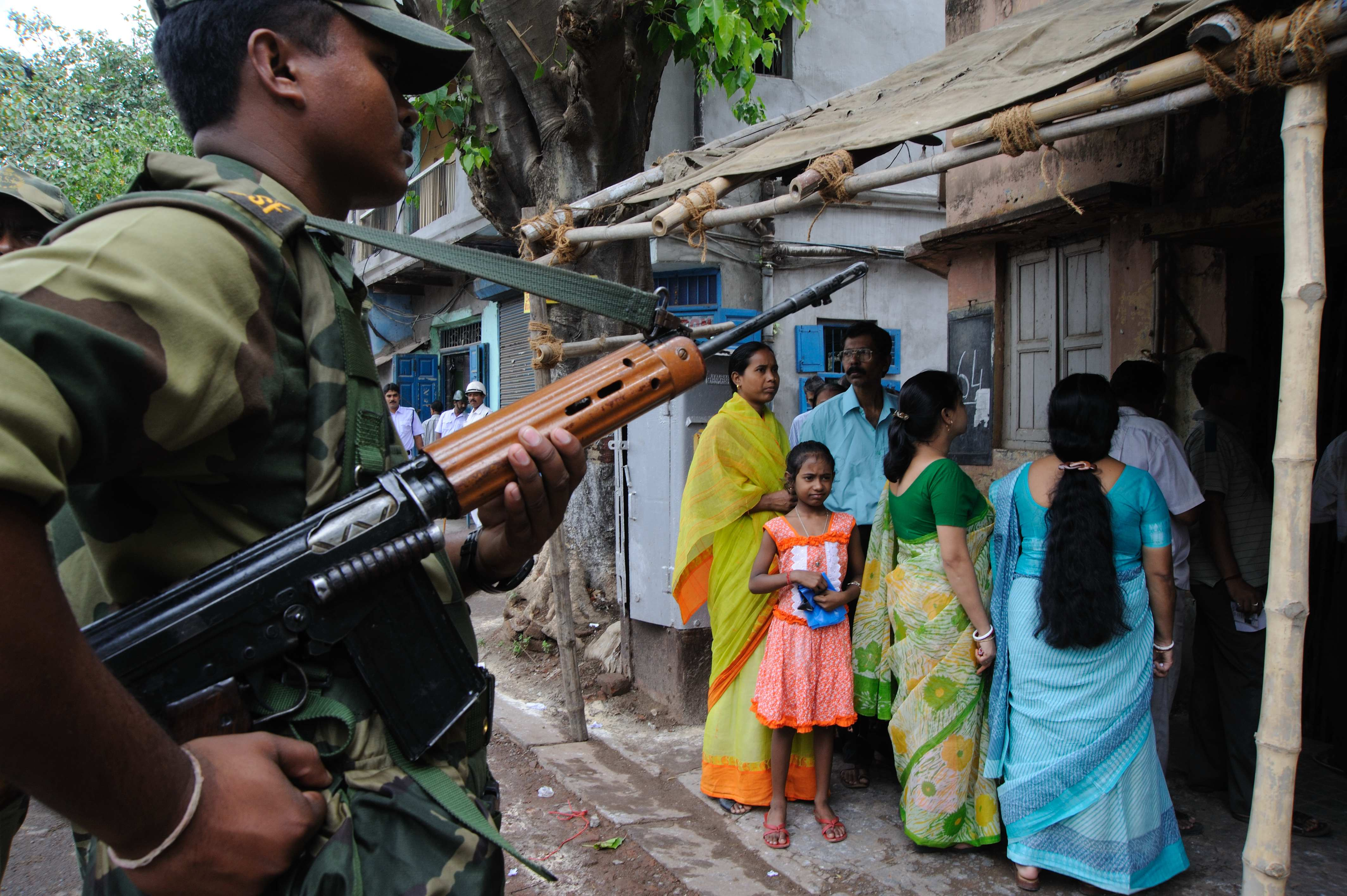
A Border Security Force soldier carrying an L1A1 rifle in West Bengal during elections, 2009

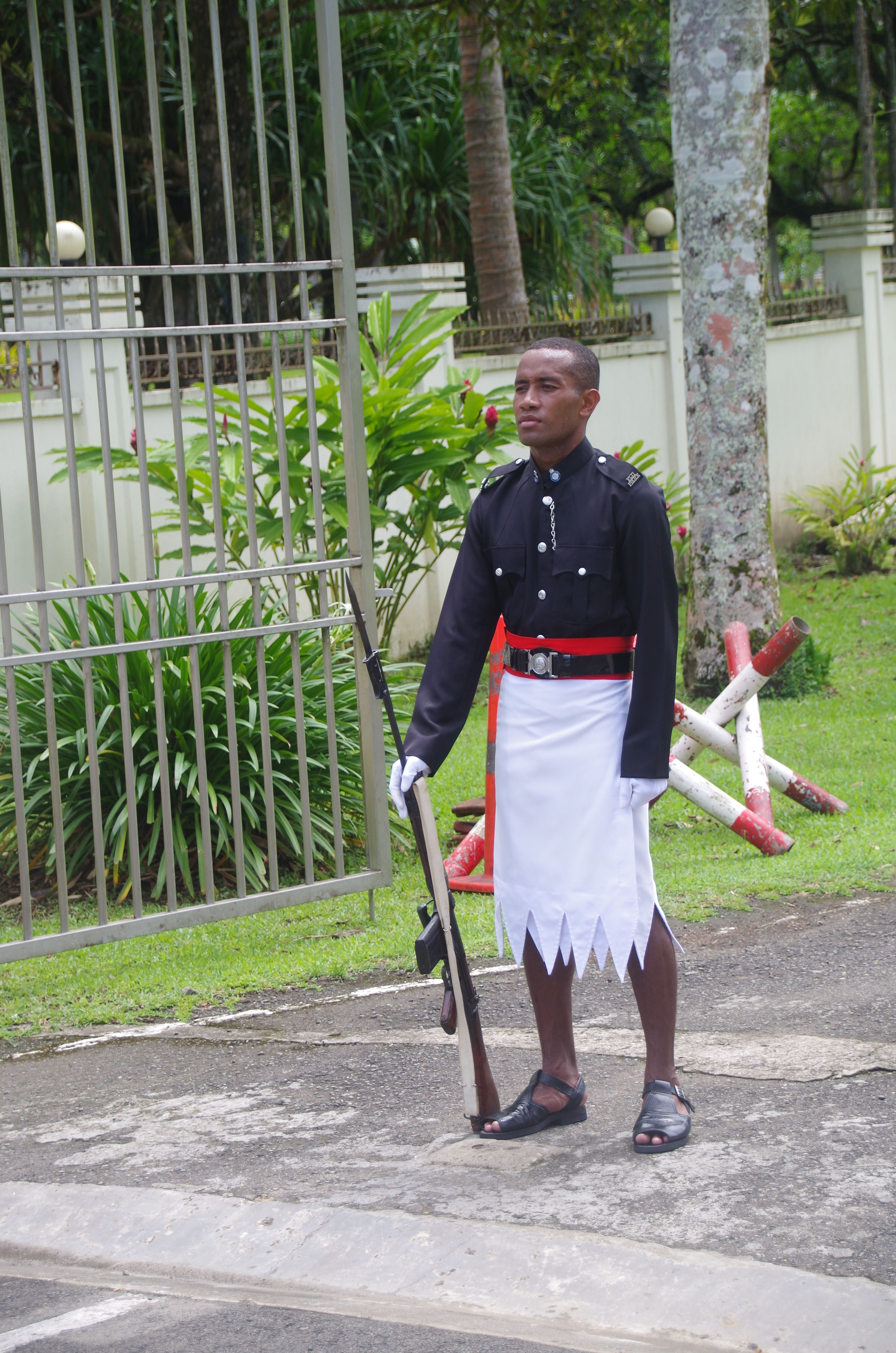
Fijian police gendamarie with L1A1 in stand at ease position

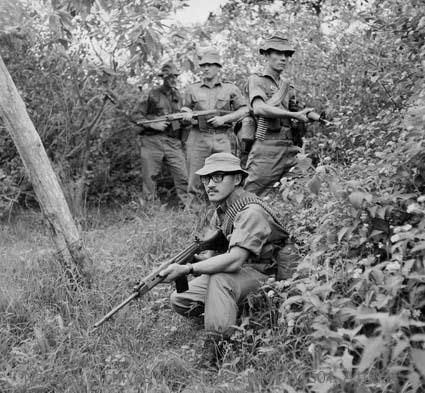
Bruneian Army officers armed with L1A1 SLRs participating in Australian jungle warfare training

== Conflicts ==
The L1A1 self-loading rifle has been used in the following conflicts:

- Malayan Emergency
- Mau Mau rebellion
- Suez Crisis
- Jebel Akhdar War
- Aden Emergency
- Indonesia–Malaysia confrontation
- Congo Crisis
- Vietnam War
- Dhofar rebellion
- India–Pakistan war of 1965
- Communist insurgency in Malaysia (1968–1989)
- The Troubles
- Rhodesian Bush War
- Nigerian Civil War
- First JVP Insurrection
- India–Pakistan war of 1971
- Soviet–Afghan War
- Falklands War
- Sri Lankan civil war
- Second JVP Insurrection
- Bougainville conflict
- Gulf War
- Sierra Leone Civil War
- Nepalese Civil War
- Kargil War
- 2008 Mumbai attacks
- 2013 Lahad Datu standoff

== Users ==
=== Current ===
- Australia: Australia's Federation Guard uses L1A1s for ceremonial events only.
- India: Used by various police units in the past and Village Defence Guards.
- Malta: Still used by its armed forces, mainly for ceremonial purposes.
- Nepal: Uses both British/Indian-made SLRs.
- Sierra Leone: 10,000 received in 2000
- Sri Lanka: Sri Lanka Corps of Military Police uses L1A1s only when taking part in events in ceremonial scarlet uniform.
- Yemen

=== Former users ===
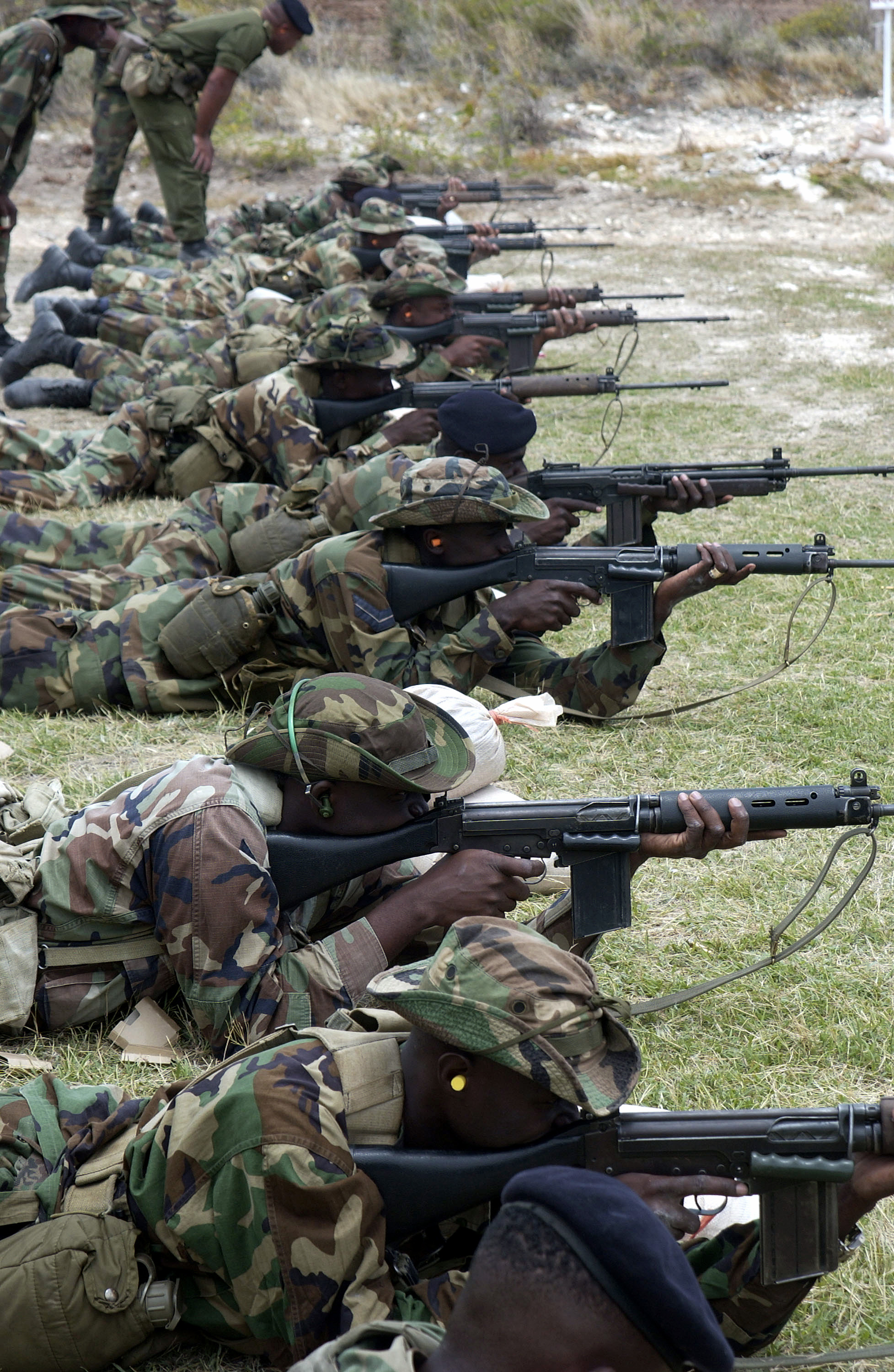
Soldiers from the Jamaica Defence Force (JDF) fire their L1A1s on a range while taking part as the opposing force during the Tradewinds 2002 Field Training Exercise, on the island of Antigua. There is a soldier with the L2A1 light support weapon with the bipod used as a handguard.

- Australia: Was produced under licence. Replaced by the F88 Austeyr.
- Afghanistan: Early anti-Soviet insurgent groups received some 1As captured by Pakistan from India. They were soon replaced due to ammunition shortage.
- Bangladesh: Indian-made 1A1 SLRs used in the Bangladesh Liberation War.
- Brunei: Uses them as standard issue infantry rifles alongside M16 service rifles.
- Canada: Produced under licence by Canadian Arsenals Limited as the C1 rifle, and C2 squad automatic rifle. Replaced in service by the C7 rifle.
- British Hong Kong: Used by the Royal Hong Kong Regiment.
- Jamaica: Uses various British and Australian L1A1s.
- Kuwait
- Malaysia: Used until the 1990s and replaced by the HK 33, Beretta AR70 and M16A1.
- New Zealand: Used Australian-built L1A1s from 1960, replaced by Steyr AUGs in 1988. The New Zealand Navy still uses the L1A1 for line throwing between ships. 15,000 British-made L1A1s were delivered to New Zealand.
- Nigeria: Used by Federal army

- Biafra: 930 FN FAL modified to SLR standard by Parker-Hale

- Papua New Guinea: Used Australian built L1A1s.
- Rhodesia: Adopted in the early 1960s, seconded to reserve status following the Rhodesia's unilateral declaration of independence. Standard service rifle of the Rhodesia Regiment.
- Singapore: Introduced by British colonial forces prior to independence to 1st and 2nd Singapore Infantry Regiments in 1957. Replaced by AR-15/M16 rifles a few years after independence.
- Sri Lanka: Australian-made, but refurbished and supplied by Singapore from 1984 to 1985. The Type 56 assault rifle is used by the Sri Lankan military.
- United Kingdom: Used by the British Armed Forces as a primary service rifle until the adoption of SA80 in 1985, at which point it began to be gradually phased out of service until it was fully replaced in 1994.
- Vanuatu: 270 SLRs, some configured as light machine guns. L1A1 Self-Loading Rifles replaced by the FAMAS in 2009.

== See also ==
- AR-10 – An American 7.62mm battle rifle design from the same period
- Armalite AR-16 – An American 7.62mm battle rifle
- CETME rifle – A Spanish 7.62mm battle rifle
- Heckler & Koch G3 – A German 7.62mm battle rifle derived from the CETME
- Howa Type 64 – A Japanese 7.62mm battle rifle
- Small Arms Weapons Effects Simulator - Infrared training device used in the 1980s used in conjunction with the L1A1 SLR
- T48 rifle – An American 7.62mm battle rifle
