= Austen submachine gun =

Austen Submachine gun
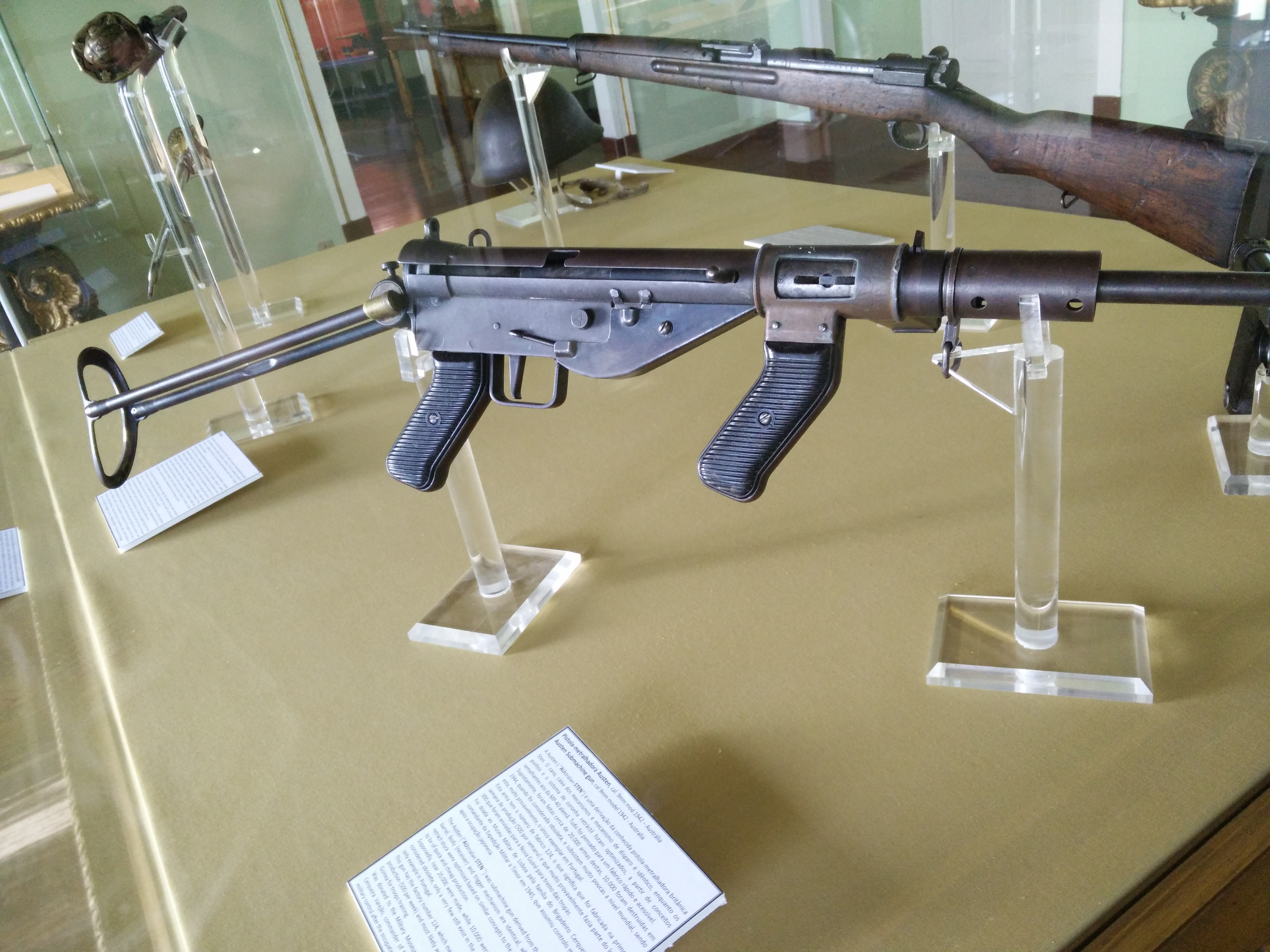
- An Austen Mark 1 submachine gun
- Type: Submachine gun
- Place of origin: Australia

Service history
- In service: 1942–1945
- Used by: See Users
- Wars: World War II; Indonesian National Revolution; Rhodesian Bush War

Production history
- Designed: 1941
- Produced: 1942–1944
- No. built: Mk I: 19,914; Mk II: 200
- Variants: Mark I, Mark II

Specifications
- Mass: Mk.I 8 lb 8 oz (3.9 kg) empty, Mk.II 6 lb 12 oz (3.1 kg) empty
- Length: (stock open/closed): 33.25 in (845 mm) / 21.75 in (552 mm)
- Barrel length: 7.8 in (198 mm)
- Cartridge: 9×19mm Parabellum
- Calibre: 9 mm
- Action: Blowback
- Rate of fire: 500 round/min
- Muzzle velocity: 1,300 ft/s (396 m/s)
- Feed system: 32-round Sten magazine or 28-round Austen magazine (Both magazines are interchangeable)

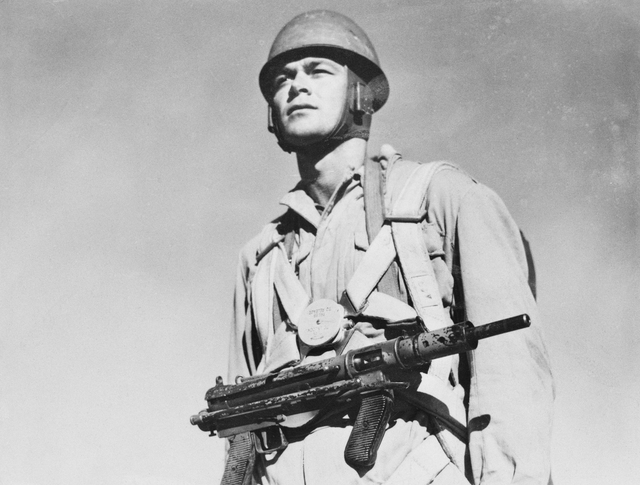
An Australian paratrooper from the Parachute Battalion Training Centre armed with an Austen Mark 1 submachine gun.

The Austen (from "Australian Sten") is a 9×19mm Australian submachine gun derived from the British Sten gun developed during the Second World War. In total 19,914 Austens were produced during the war by Diecasters Ltd of Melbourne and W. T. Carmichael Ltd of Sydney.

== Design and development ==
With the war in Europe demanding most of the available materiel for the British, Australia was not in a position to purchase weapons from the United Kingdom or the United States, and so they had to develop their own submachine guns. The British Sten submachine gun was taken as the basis for the Austen. The barrel, body (receiver) and trigger mechanism of the Mark II Sten were copied, while the folding stock and bolt, with separate firing pin and telescopic cover over the return spring, were copied from the German MP40. The folding stock also included a screwdriver and a cleaning rod which both unscrewed from the tubes of the stock. The weapon also featured twin pistol-style grips; the latter containing a small spare parts container inside. The weapon had a selective-fire feature permitting the operator to fire single shots or fully automatic at 500 rounds per minute.

An interesting production feature of the Austen was that some parts were manufactured by the diecasting process. These parts were the magazine housing, part of the mechanism for the stock and the forward half of the magazine. The magazine loader was also diecast. The two firms manufacturing the Austen were specialist diecasting companies.

There was a suppressed version made, the Austen (S) Mark I, which was possibly used by the Z Special Unit.

A second version, the Mark II Austen, was developed during 1942 and 200 were manufactured by the end of the year for trials. By January 1943 Mk.II guns had undergone routine testing and an order for 200 XP MK.II guns at a cost of £5 each was placed on the 8th of February 1943 for operational testing and user reports. This model made even more extensive use of diecasting; the large grip assemblies at both the front and back of the gun were produced in this way. According to Ian McCollum the Mk.II was not ready until 1946, after the end of the Second World War. Two hundred examples were built, and these were both adopted and declared obsolete in August 1946.

The Austen never achieved the level of popularity that the Owen gun achieved. This was largely because the Owen was a very reliable weapon and although the Austen was an improvement on the basic Sten, it was never able to achieve the Owen's reliability.

Regarded as obsolete by 1945, the Austen was rarely used in subsequent decades. In contrast, the Owen was widely used by the Australian Army until the 1960s.

== Users ==
- Australia
- Dutch East Indies
- Rhodesia
