= List of World War II weapons of China =

Below are different types of weapons used during World War II by the People's Liberation Army, the National Revolutionary Army, and numerous warlord forces.

== Small arms ==
=== Pistols (manual and semi-automatic) ===
Name	Cartridge	Origin	Photo	Notes
Astra Model 900	7.63×25mm Mauser 9mm Largo	Kingdom of Spain		
Mauser C96	7.63×25mm Mauser 7.65×21 Parabellum (Rare) 9×19mm Parabellum 45 ACP (China) 9 mm Mauser export (rare) 8mm Gasser	German Empire Republic of China		Locally-produced Mauser (Germany), Taiyuan Arsenal, Taku Naval Arsenal and Hanyang Arsenal (China) Called the Box Cannon (盒子炮). The most common and popular pistol since the beginning of the Republic. Imported from Germany and Spain (Astra 900 and MM31), but mostly produced locally in various arsenals, the larger being in Hanyang, Shanghai, Gongxian, Taku and Shanxi. Often used with a detachable shoulder stock. The pistol used the 7.63x25mm caliber, but a version in .45 ACP was also produced in Shanxi, called the "Type 17"
Mauser M712	7.63×25mm Mauser 7.65×21 Parabellum (Rare) 9×19mm Parabellum 45 ACP (China) 9 mm Mauser export (rare) 8mm Gasser	German Empire Republic of China		Mauser (Germany), Taiyuan Arsenal, Taku Naval Arsenal and Hanyang Arsenal (China)
Ruby	.32 ACP	Republic of China Kingdom of Spain		Originally made in Spain, but produced in China by the Hanyang Arsenal, as well as smaller shops.
Browning Hi-Power	7.65×21 Parabellum 9×19mm Parabellum.40 S&W	Belgium Canada		Limited numbers in the Burma Campaign X-Forces and Y-Forces Produced by the John Inglis Company in Canada for China through the Mutual Aid Board in 1943. Originally intended to make 180,000, only 4,000 were delivered to Karachi, India before the end of the war, with supply problems over "the Hump" making it hard for them to reach the Chinese Y Force. Production was cancelled in 1944, but restarted in late 1945, with 40,000 being used in the Civil War after World War II.
FN M1900	.32 ACP (7.65×17mm Browning SR)	Republic of China Belgium		Imported and locally-produced
FN Model 1922	9×17mm Browning7.65×17mm Browning	Republic of China Belgium		
Nambu Type 14	8mm Nambu	Japan		Captured
North China Type 19	8mm Nambu	China-Nanjing		The Type 14 was captured from the Imperial Japanese Army and nicknamed the Turtle Shell Pistol (王八盒子) or Chicken Thigh Pistol (鸡腿撸子). It was also supplied to Manchukuo and the Collaborationist Chinese Army, who also produced a very small amount of the Type 19, a copy of the Type 14.
Colt Model 1903 Pocket Hammerless	.32 ACP (M1903).380 ACP (M1908)	United States		Officers only
Nagant M1895	7.62×38mmR	Russian Empire		
Colt M1911A1	.45 ACP	United States		American Lend Lease
M1917 revolver	.45 ACP (11.43×23mm).45 Auto Rim (11.43×23mmR)	United States		American Lend Lease
S&W Regulation Police	.32 S&W Long	United States Republic of China		Smith & Wesson revolvers in this caliber, copies of the S&W Regulation Police, was produced in the 44th Arsenal located in Guizhou during slack time, starting 1942, often with a detachable shoulder stock.

=== Rifles ===
Name	Cartridge	Origin	Photo	Notes
Hanyang 88	7.92×57mm Mauser	Qing dynasty		The most common Chinese rifle in the war and was based on the German Gewehr 88 originally used by the New Armies of the Qing dynasty .
Gewehr 1888	M/88, 7.92×57mm Mauser	German Empire		(Several Gewehr 88's also found their way to China after World War I and even its predecessor, the Gewehr 71/84, was still in very limited use.). Around 1,000,000 were produced in several Chinese arsenals before production ceased in 1944. There also existed a more uncommon carbine version.
Gewehr 98	M/88 until 1903 7.92×57mm Mauser later	German Empire		Some surplus weapons from various countries in possession of the Gewehr 98 after World War I sold these off internationally, with some ending up in the arms of Chinese warlords.
Standardmodell	7.92×57mm Mauser7×57mm Mauser7.65×53mm Mauser	Weimar Republic		
Chiang Kai-Shek rifle	8×57mm IS (7.92x57mm Mauser)	Republic of China		In the Chinese National Armament Standards Conference of 1932 it was decided that the Mauser Standardmodell was to be the standard-issue rifle of China. It started being imported from Germany in 1934 and production in Chinese arsenals also began in 1935, first under the name "Type 24 Rifle", but was soon renamed to the "Chiang Kai-Shek rifle" after the Generalissimo. It would remain the standard service rifle throughout the war, but would never outproduce the Hanyang 88, with the total number of Chinese produced Chiang Kai-Shek rifles made between 1935 and 1945 being ~360,000. In 1935, Germany adopted a modified Standardmodell as their service rifle under the designation Karabiner 98k, continued Chinese imports between 1938 and 1939 would consist of some 100,000 examples of this rifle.
Karabiner 98k	7.92×57mm Mauser	Nazi Germany		
FN Model 1924	7×57mm Mauser 7.62×51mm NATO .30-06 Springfield 7.65×53mm Mauser 7.92×57mm Mauser	Belgium Republic of China		After World War I, German arms exports were banned under the Treaty of Versailles, and weapons companies of other countries stepped in to fill the gap. A very large amount of Belgian M1924 rifles and M1930 carbines from FN were sold to China. Chinese arsenals also produced copies, such as the "Type 21 Carbine" from Guangdong or the "Type 77 Rifle" (named after the date of the Marco Polo Bridge Incident) from Zhejiang.
Vz. 98/22	7.92×57mm	Czechoslovakia		After World War I, German arms exports were banned under the Treaty of Versailles, and weapons companies of other countries stepped in to fill the gap. Czechoslovak Brno produced and exported a modified version of the German Gewehr 98. Records show around 200,000 were shipped to China between 1927 and 1939.
Vz. 24	7.92×57mm	Czechoslovakia		Right after the ZB vz. 98/22, Brno started producing the shorter ZB vz. 24. Around 100,000 were imported by the Central Government of China between 1937 and 1938, and several tens of thousands more by provincial governors.
Mosin–Nagant 1891 Mosin–Nagant 1891/30	7.62×54mmR	Soviet Union		Called the Three-Line Repeater (三线步枪), due to the old Russian measurement of the caliber, or Water Repeater (水连珠), believed to be due to Chinese first encountering the rifle from Russian Naval Infantry. Many Mosin-Nagant 1891 rifles were supplied during the Sino-Soviet cooperation in the 1920s and to the troops of the pro-Soviet Sheng Shicai. The Soviet Aid Program early in the war also supplied China with 50,000 Mosin-Nagant 1891/30 rifles, which were used by second line and garrison troops due to the caliber difference.
Carcano 1891	6.5×52mm	Italy		The Carcano rifle was first imported from Italy in 1920, with an order of 40,000. In 1922, a further 14,000 rifles were purchased. In 1924, a further 40,000 rifles were obtained. Japanese records show these rifles being captured in Fujian. In 1941, Japan sold 15,000 of these captured weapons to the collaborationist Nanjing Army.
M1917 Enfield	.30-06	United States		Common Chinese Lend-Lease rifle. Most of the X Force in Burma were carrying this rifle. At first the rifles were cut-down to a shorter length, to better suit the shorter Chinese soldiers, but later issued rifles were of normal length.
M1903A3 Springfield	.30-06	United States		The M1903A3 Springfield was also commonly issued to soldiers of the X Force. It was also used by Chinese commandos in 1945, provided by the OSS.
M1 Carbine	.30 Carbine	United States		Milton E. Miles of SACO considered the light-weight M1 Carbine to be more suitable to the Chinese soldiers than the bigger Mauser rifles, therefore, most SACO units from 1943 on were issued with this semi-automatic weapon. It was also used by the X Force in Burma.
Lee-Enfield No.4 Mk I*	.303 British	United Kingdom Canada United States		The North American produced version of the Lee-Enfield was issued to the X Force while they were training in India. The rifles were part of the Lend-Lease program and marked as US property. Once American rifles started being issued, the Lee-Enfields were kept as training weapons and for guard duty. 40,000 were supplied from 1942 onward.American Lend Lease, used in training in Burma
Mauser 1907 Mauser Type 1 Mauser Type 4	6.8×57mm 7.92×57mm	China Germany		The Type 1 was a Chinese-produced version of a pattern of imported German rifle (Mauser 1907) from the end of the Qing dynasty. Originally chambered in 6.8x57mm, but changed to 7.92×57mm with the new designation Type 4 (usually just called the "Type 1 7.9mm"), in 1915. The Type 4 were the older Chinese standard rifles and common during the Warlord era. In World War II, they were outdated, but still in use by more poorly equipped units.
Liao Type 13	7.92×57mm 6.5×50mmSR	China Manchukuo		A hybrid between Arisaka and Mauser 4 produced in the Japanese puppet state Manchukuo and before. Around 140,000 are estimated to have been produced in total. Most of the weapons are using the 7.92×57mm Mauser cartridge, but some have turned up chambered in 6.5×50mmSR Arisaka.
Arisaka Type 30Arisaka Type 38	6.5×50mmSR	Japan China China-Nanjing		While the Japanese Arisaka rifle was supplied to collaborationist units, particularly the Manchukuo Imperial Army and used as captured weapons by Allied ones, China had also imported and produced (in Shanxi) Type 30 and 38 Rifles since before the war. Up to 1917, ~200,000 Type 38 and 150,000 Type 30 rifles had been imported. The Type 38 was called 38 Big Cover (三八大盖), by the Chinese. Copies of the Type 30 and 38, in 7.92×57mm and 6.5×50mmSR respectively, both named "Type 19", were also made in the collaborationist China.
Karabinek wz. 1929	7.92×57mm	Poland		The Polish Karabinek wz. 1929 were exported to China. It is estimated this was only a small amount.
Mannlicher M1886	M86: 11×58mmR M86-88: 8×52mmR	Austria-Hungary		Many were imported very long before World War II, but were still used by some rear-line units.
Mannlicher M1888	M88 8×52mmR M88-90 and M88-95: 8×50mmR M88/24: 8×57mm IS	Austria-Hungary		Many were imported very long before World War II, but were still used by some rear-line units.
ZH-29	7.92×57mm	Czechoslovakia		210 examples of this weapon were purchased in 1930 and 1931 for Northeast China. They were probably captured in the Japanese invasion of Manchuria.
Murata Type 13	11×60mmR Murata 8×53mmR Murata	Japan		Local defense militias in Manchukuo were issued obsolete weapons such as these.

== Sources ==
- Jowett, Philip S. (2004). Rays of the Rising Sun: Armed Forces of Japan's Asian Allies 1931–45: Volume 1: China and Manchukuo. Helion & Company Limited. ISBN 978-1-906033-78-1.
- Jowett, Philip S. (2005). The Chinese Army 1937–49: World War II and Civil War. Osprey Publishing. ISBN 978-1-84176-904-2.
- Ball, Robert W. D. (2011). Mauser Military Rifles of the World. Iola: Gun Digest Books. ISBN 978-1-4402-2892-6.
- Ness, Leland; Shih, Bin (July 2016). Kangzhan: Guide to Chinese Ground Forces 1937–45. Helion & Company. ISBN 978-1-910294-42-0.
- Lai, Benjamin (18 Oct 2018). Chinese Soldier vs Japanese Soldier: China 1937–38. Combat 37. Osprey Publishing. ISBN 978-1-4728-2820-0.
- Shih, Bin (2018). China's Small Arms of the Second Sino-Japanese War (1937–1945).
