= General Liu rifle =

General Liu Rifle
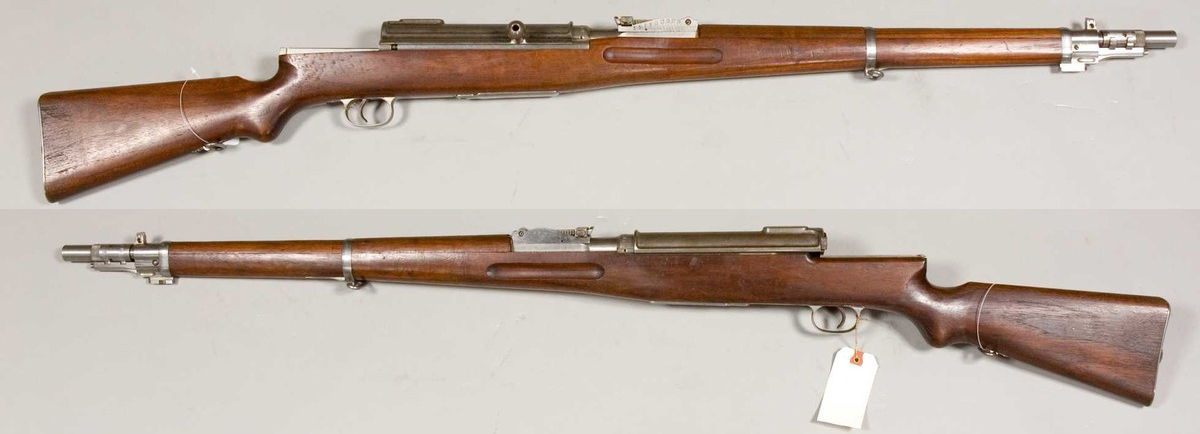
- A sample from the Swedish Army Museum, manufactured in 1915
- Type: Semi-automatic / Straight-pull bolt action rifle
- Place of origin: Republic of China

Production history
- Designer: General Liu Qing En
- Designed: ca. 1914
- Manufacturer: Hanyang Arsenal, Pratt & Whitney Machine Tool
- Produced: 1914–1918
- No. built: approx. 10

Specifications
- Mass: 4.7 kg (10 lb 6 oz) empty
- Length: 122.5 cm (48.2 in)
- Barrel length: 64.7 cm (25.5 in)
- Cartridge: 7.9x57mm S-Patrone
- Caliber: 7.92 mm
- Action: Gas operated, rotating bolt
- Muzzle velocity: 780 m/s (2,600 ft/s)
- Feed system: Integral magazine, 6 round capacity
- Sights: Rear: Ladder graduated 400–2000 m Front: Blade

The General Liu rifle was a semi-automatic rifle named after its inventor and the first Superintendent of the Hanyang Arsenal, General Liu Qing En (1869–1929), as the rifle never received any other designation. It was one of the first Chinese semi-automatic rifles. The rifle used a muzzle "gas-trap" system similar to the Bang rifle (other rifles including this system were the Gewehr 41 and early production models of M1 Garand). The rifle's method of operation could be switched from gas to straight-pull bolt action by rotating counterclockwise the cylinder located on the muzzle, to revert to gas-operated reloading the cylinder had to be rotated back (clockwise). The stock had a compartment for cleaning tools.

== History ==
At the beginning of 1914, Liu contacted the Pratt & Whitney Tool Company in Hartford, Connecticut to purchase machinery for the Hanyang Arsenal. A contract for US$1,082,500 was signed with the company on 11 April, with delivery expected in 24 months. Later that year in September, Liu—along with his family and seven subordinates—arrived in Hartford, with the purpose of the visit being to familiarize themselves with the machinery. Liu stayed in Hartford at least until June 1915.

On 8 September 1916, two versions of the rifle were tested at the Nan Yuan Proving Ground in Beijing. The first version was made at Hanyang with a hand-made driving spring, the second was manufactured at Pratt & Whitney and had a machined spring. Testing revealed that the hand-made springs proved to be too weak to properly cycle the rounds, as opposed to the ones produced in US.

In 1918 two rifles were tested at the Springfield Armory by Julian Hatcher.

The machinery purchased in 1914 was loaded onto a boat for delivery to China, though the vessel sank in transit. In 1919 the machinery was recovered and arrived in Shanghai, where it was kept in a warehouse until 1921, when it was diverted to Gongxian Arsenal.

In the summer of 1919, Liu suffered a stroke which caused paralysis of one side of his body.

After being sent to Gongxian, the machinery and tooling equipment was later redirected back to Hanyang but it did not arrive until 1935. When the machinery arrived at Hanyang, it was set up and initially used to manufacture Hanyang 88 rifles, and was later changed to produce Type 24 Chiang Kai-shek rifles.
