= List of Chaco War firearms =

This is a list of firearms used in the Chaco War. The Chaco War was fought from 1932-1935 between Bolivia and Paraguay over control of the northern part of the Gran Chaco region (known as Chaco Boreal) of South America, which was thought to be rich in oil.

Many Bolivian weapons were captured by the Paraguayans.

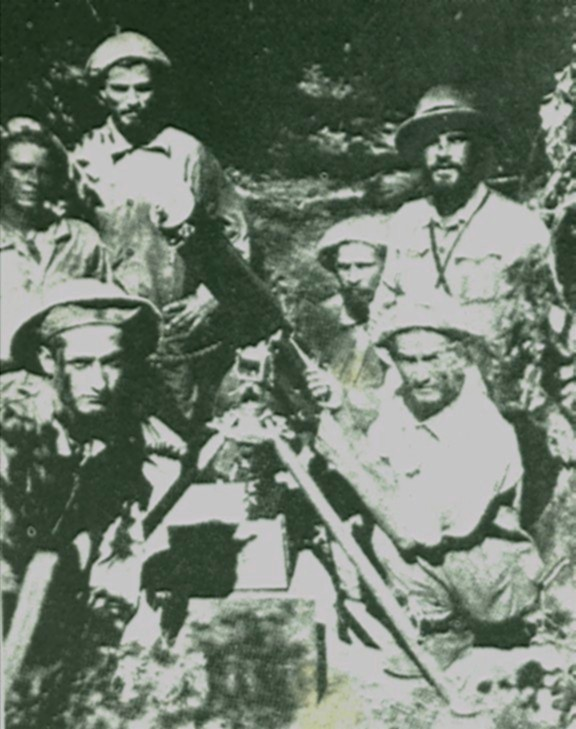
A Vickers machine gun in Paraguayan service.

== Pistols ==
- Browning M1911: bought by Bolivia;
- FN 1903: most numerous pistol of Paraguay, bought from 1927;
- Colt 1903: Bought by Paraguay between 1927 and 1929
- Browning 1900: Popular sidearm with Paraguayan Officers
- Browning M1910: in Bolivian service;
- Luger Model 1906: bought by Bolivia from 1912;
- Mannlicher M1905: bought by Paraguay;
- Mauser C96: bought by Bolivia prior to the war;
- Smith & Wesson Military & Police: bought by Paraguay.
- Walther PP: in Bolivian service.

== Rifles ==
- Argentine Mauser Model 1891 (also known as Modelo 1895): bought by Bolivia;
- Argentine Mauser Model 1909: some covertly supplied to Paraguay;
- FN Model 30: bought by both sides;
- Haenel Model 1909 carbine: bought by Paraguay;
- Lee–Metford: in Paraguayan service since 1904;
- Mauser Model 1895 (Mauser Modelo Chileno): used by Paraguay;
- Mauser Model 1907: acquired by both Bolivia and Paraguay;
- Mauser Standardmodell rifle: supplied to both sides;
- Oviedo Model 1927: Spanish low-quality copy of the Mauser Model 1907 produced for Paraguay;
- Oerlikon SSG36: antitank rifle bought by Bolivia;
- Vetterli M1870/87/15: Bought by Paraguay
- vz. 24: bought in large numbers by Bolivia, many captured by the Paraguayans;
- vz. 33: used by Paraguay.

== Submachine guns ==
- Vollmer VMP-30: bought by Bolivia, small amounts bought by Paraguay before the war and captured during it;
- Bergmann MP18: bought by Bolivia
- Bergmann/Haenel MP 28.II: bought by Bolivia, small amounts bought and captured by Paraguay;
- Bergmann MP35: bought by Bolivia. There may be a confusion with the similar-looking MP 28;
- Sig Model 1920: Bought by Bolivia, some captured by Paraguay
- Steyr Solothurn S1-100: bought by Bolivia, some captured by Paraguay;
- Suomi KP/-26 and KP/-31: imported by Bolivia, in small numbers;
- Thompson submachine gun: dubious claim that a few have been imported by Paraguay, other sources explain some were bought by Bolivia

== Machine guns ==
- Browning Commercial MG38 and MG40: bought by both Bolivia and Paraguay;
- Colt–Browning M1895: Bought in small numbers by Bolivia and Paraguay
- Lewis gun: used by Bolivia;
- Madsen machine gun: in service with both sides;
- Maxim Machinegun:Used by Bolivia and Paraguay
- Vickers machine gun (Types C, E and F): bought by Bolivia;some captured by Paraguay
- Vickers–Berthier light machine gun: bought by Bolivia;
- ZB vz. 26 and ZB vz. 30: bought by Bolivia.

== See also ==
- Aerial operations in the Chaco War
- Tank warfare in the Chaco War

== Bibliography ==
- Ball, Robert W. D. (2011). Mauser Military Rifles of the World. Iola: Gun Digest Books. ISBN 9781440228926.
- de Quesada, Alejandro (20 November 2011). The Chaco War 1932-35: South America's greatest modern conflict. Osprey Publishing. ISBN 978-1-84908-901-2.
- Huon, Jean (September 2013). "The Chaco War". Small Arms Review. Vol. 17, no. 3. Archived from the original on 2019-08-19.
- Scarlata, Paul (May 2014). "La Guerra del Chaco: fighting in El Infierno Verde: Part 2: tanks, airplanes, submachine guns: all played a role in this bloody conflict over some of the world's most godforsaken real estate". Shotgun News.
