= Hanyang =

Hanyang may refer to:

== China ==
- Hanyang District (漢陽區, 汉阳区, Hànyáng Qū), Wuhan, Hubei

- Hanyang Arsenal (漢陽兵工廠), founded in 1891 as one of the oldest modern arsenals in Chinese history
- Hanyang 88 (漢陽八八式步槍), Chinese rifle used in the Second Sino-Japanese War

- Hanyang, Jiangxi (寒阳镇), a town in Lushan District, Jiujiang, Jiangxi
- Hanyang, Shanxi (韩阳镇), a town in Yongji City, Shanxi
- Tianshui in Gansu, formerly known as Hanyang
  - Hanyang Commandery (漢陽郡, 汉阳郡, Hànyángjùn), a medieval administrative division of China
  - Hanyang County (漢陽縣, 汉阳县, Hànyángxiàn), a medieval administrative division of China
- Hanyang Motorcycles (广建雅), chinese motorcycle brand

== South Korea ==
- Seoul; Hanyang (한양; 漢陽) is one of the former names of Seoul
- Hanyang University (한양대학교; 漢陽大學校), with a main campus in Seoul and a second campus in Ansan
