= Mauser Model 1924 =

Mauser Model 1924 may refer to:

- The Belgian variant of FN Model 24 and Model 30, made by FN Herstal
- The Czech Vz. 24, made by Zbrojovka Brno
- The German Standardmodell rifle, made by Mauser
