= HY1935 bayonet =

Knife bayonet

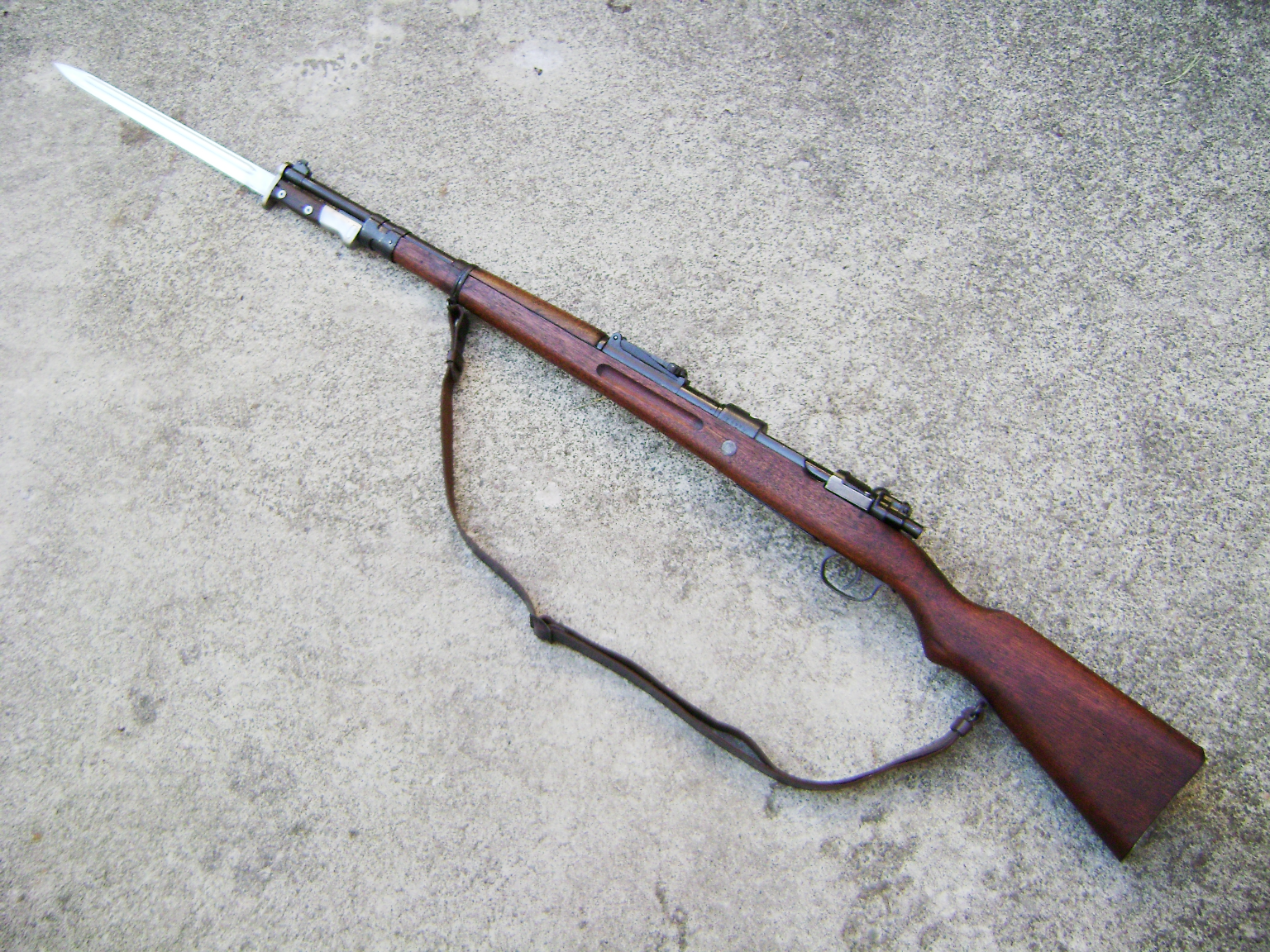
Chiang Kai-shek rifle with HY1935 bayonet

The Hanyang M1935 bayonet is a bayonet used on the Chinese Chiang Kai-Shek rifle. It is based on the Mauser S84/98 III bayonet used on German Gewehr 98 rifles and derivatives and utilizes the same Mauser bayonet lug pattern.
