= Mukden Arsenal Mauser =

Liao Type 13
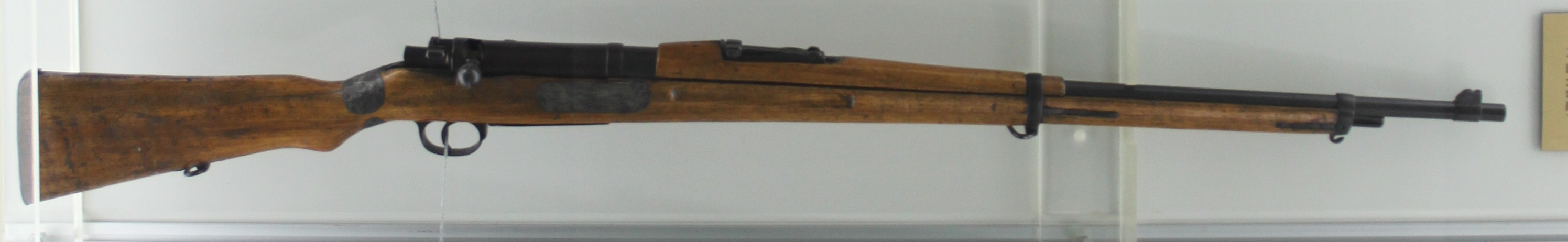
- Type: Rifle
- Place of origin: Republic of China; Manchukuo

Service history
- Used by: Fengtian clique Manchukuo Imperial Army; Inner Mongolian Army

Production history
- Designer: Mukden Arsenal
- Designed: 1924
- Manufacturer: Mukden Arsenal
- Produced: 1924-1938
- No. built: c. 140,000

Specifications
- Mass: 9.4 pounds (4.3 kg)
- Length: 48.82 inches (124.0 cm)
- Barrel length: 29.13 inches (740 mm)
- Cartridge: 7.92×57mm 6.5×50mmSR
- Action: Bolt action
- Feed system: 5-round, staggered column, flush, box internal magazine
- Sights: Tangent leaf rear sight graduated to 2,000 metres (6,600 ft)

The Mukden Arsenal Mauser, also known as the Model 13 Mauser and Liao Type 13, was a rifle that implemented characteristics of both the Mauser Type 4 and Arisaka rifles. They were mostly built in the Mukden arsenal in Manchukuo.

== History ==
=== Origin ===
The Österreichische Waffenfabriksgesellschaft (Œ.W.G.) continued improvement of its Steyr Model 1912 Mauser export rifle after 1912 and during World War I. The final 1917 prototype featured a shrouded firing pin and striker, two gas vent holes, detachable box magazine, and receiver dust cover, taking a lot of influence from the Japanese Type 38 rifle which itself was derived from Mauser. However, before the war's end the production of Mannlicher M1895s for the Austro-Hungarian Army was prioritized, and the 1919 peace treaty prohibited military arms production in Austria. Steyr therefore sold a license to a customer in the Far East, which got rid of the detachable box magazine. It has also been suggested that incomplete guns were imported from Austria in 1918–1920.

=== Production ===
The factory established in Shenyang (later known as Mukden) began producing the rifle around 1924. This date is believed to be the origin of the designation "Type 13" as the Nationalist Chinese calendar begins in 1911. After the Japanese invasion of Manchuria in 1931, rifles continued to be produced in the newly created puppet state of Manchukuo, until the factory switched over to producing Arisaka rifles in 1938. It is estimated that around 140,000 Type 13 rifles were made in total. Most of the weapons are using the 7.92×57mm Mauser cartridge, but about 10,000 were chambered in 6.5×50mmSR Arisaka after in late 1944 the production was restarted again for the Manchukuo Imperial Army. Besides different chamber dimensions, this version had a steel block inside the magazine installed in order to shorten it without changing the production technology.

=== Use ===
The rifles were originally used by the soldiers of Zhang Zuolin (who established the factory and the production of the rifle) in various battles during the Warlord Era. 72,679 rifles of this type were captured by the Japanese after the Mukden incident in 1931. The Manchukuo Imperial Army then began using these rifles, as well as newly produced ones, although by the start of the Second Sino-Japanese War the number of rifles in service is estimated to have been fairly small, most likely due to the standardization program and shift towards Japanese weapons during the 1930s. The collaborationist Inner Mongolian Army of Prince Demchugdongrub, and the later puppet state of Mengjiang, had 10,000 of these rifles as well, received in 1929.

== Design detail ==
=== Arisaka characteristics ===
The rifle shared many features with the Arisaka rifle, such as a two-part stock, an ovoid bolt handle, and double-gas escape ports on the receiver. It also had a sliding bolt cover that attached to the bolt, and was removable. Another similarity it had with the Arisaka was the bolt being bored from the rear, in order to allow room for a mainspring, which was fixed in by the use of a large housing.

=== Mauser characteristics ===
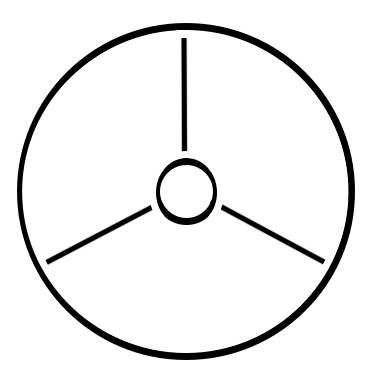
The symbol of Mukden arsenal

The rifle's safety is similar to that of the Mauser 1898; however, instead of being threaded, the bolt sleeve is fixed to the bolt by way of lugs. The rifle has a pistol grip stock, but with no grasping grooves. Its upper handguard runs from the receiver ring to the lower band. The upper and lower bands are both thinner than on a Mauser, and there is a parade hook for the upper band. The nose cap of the rifle has a short H bayonet lug, so only a bayonet with a muzzle ring can be fitted to it. The lower barrel band has a swivel, and there is a quick-release sling fitting behind the stock's pistol grip.

=== Specifications ===
The rifle was built to be 48.82 inches (124.0 cm) long, with the barrel making up 29.13 inches (740 mm) of that, to weigh 9.4 pounds (4.3 kg). It was designed to be a bolt-action rifle with a 5-round box magazine, and to have a tangent leaf rear sight that was graduated to 2,000 metres (6,600 ft). It was made mostly to fire 7.92×57mm (Mauser) bullets, but some were modified to hold 6.5×50mm (Arisaka) bullets; the modified version was given an auxiliary block in the back of the magazine well in order to compensate for the size difference of the cartridges. The rifle had a left-handed 4-groove rifling. The top of the receiver ring was marked with the symbol of the Mukden arsenal, and the serial number of the gun was placed on the left side of the receiver ring.

== See also ==
- Chiang Kai-shek rifle
