= 7×57mm Mauser =

German military rifle cartridge

7×57mm
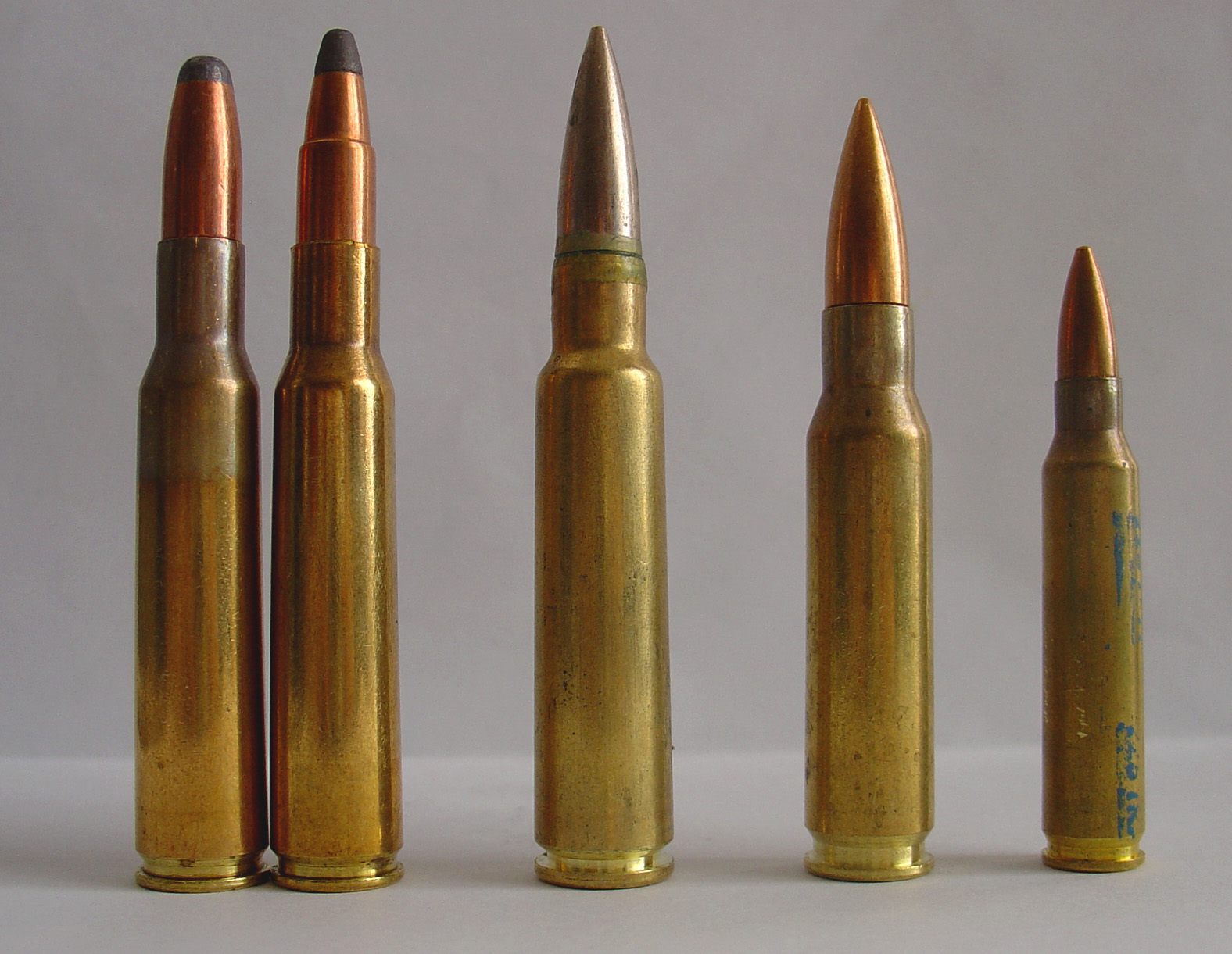
- Two 7×57mm cartridges next to a 7.5×55mm/GP11 (middle), .308 Winchester and .223 Remington (far right)
- Type: Rifle
- Place of origin: German Empire

Service history
- Used by: Austria-Hungary; Spain; Dominican Republic; Colombia; Mexico; Brazil; Chile; Cuba; Kingdom of Serbia; Venezuela; First Philippine Republic; Boers
- Wars: First Rif War; Spanish–American War; Philippine–American War; Mexican Revolution; Second Boer War; Macedonian Struggle; Balkan Wars; First World War; Spanish Civil War other conflicts

Production history
- Designer: Paul Mauser
- Designed: 1892
- Produced: 1892–present
- Variants: 7×57mmR (rimmed)

Specifications
- Parent case: none
- Case type: Rimless, bottleneck
- Bullet diameter: 7.25 mm (0.285 in)
- Land diameter: 6.98 mm (0.275 in)
- Neck diameter: 8.25 mm (0.325 in)
- Shoulder diameter: 10.92 mm (0.430 in)
- Base diameter: 12.01 mm (0.473 in)
- Rim diameter: 12.10 mm (0.476 in)
- Rim thickness: 1.15 mm (0.045 in)
- Case length: 57.00 mm (2.244 in)
- Overall length: 78.00 mm (3.071 in)
- Case capacity: 3.90 cm^{3} (60.2 gr H_{2}O)
- Rifling twist: 220 mm (1 in 8.66 in)
- Primer type: Large rifle
- Maximum pressure (C.I.P.): 390.00 MPa (56,565 psi)
- Maximum pressure (SAAMI): 351.63 MPa (51,000 psi)
- Maximum CUP: 46,000 CUP

Ballistic performance
Bullet mass/type	Velocity	Energy
8.0 g (123 gr) RWS KS	900.0 m/s (2,953 ft/s)	3,240 J (2,390 ft⋅lbf)
10.5 g (162 gr) RWS ID Classic	800.0 m/s (2,625 ft/s)	3,360 J (2,480 ft⋅lbf)
11.2 g (173 gr) RWS HMK	770.0 m/s (2,526 ft/s)	3,320 J (2,450 ft⋅lbf)
11.2 g (173 gr) Factory Military	700.0 m/s (2,297 ft/s)	2,746 J (2,025 ft⋅lbf)
- Test barrel length: 735 mm (29 in) 173 g military loading, 600 mm (23.62 in) RWS; Source: RWS / RUAG Ammotech

7×57mmR

Specifications
- Case type: Rimmed, bottlenecked
- Bullet diameter: 7.25 mm (0.285 in)
- Neck diameter: 8.25 mm (0.325 in)
- Shoulder diameter: 10.92 mm (0.430 in)
- Base diameter: 12.05 mm (0.474 in)
- Rim diameter: 13.50 mm (0.531 in)
- Rim thickness: 1.60 mm (0.063 in)
- Case length: 57.00 mm (2.244 in)
- Overall length: 78.00 mm (3.071 in)
- Case capacity: 3.90 cm^{3} (60.2 gr H_{2}O)
- Rifling twist: 220 mm (1 in 8.66 in)
- Primer type: Large rifle
- Maximum pressure (C.I.P.): 340.00 MPa (49,313 psi)

The 7×57mm Mauser (designated as the 7 mm Mauser or 7×57mm by the SAAMI and 7 × 57 by the C.I.P.) is a first-generation smokeless powder rimless bottlenecked rifle cartridge. It was developed by Paul Mauser of the Mauser company in 1892 and adopted as a military cartridge by Spain in 1893. It was subsequently adopted by several other countries as the standard military cartridge, and although now obsolete as a military cartridge, it remains in widespread international use as a sporting round. The 7×57 Mauser (originally known in Britain as the .275) was a popular stalking cartridge and sporting rifles in this chambering were made by the famous British riflemakers, such as John Rigby, Holland and Holland, Westley Richards and others. British cartridge nomenclature designated caliber in inches, and the cartridge was known as the .275 bore after the measurement of a 7 mm rifle's bore across the lands. The cartridge is today often erroneously referred to as the ".275 Rigby": The cartridge was never referred to in the British Commonwealth as the ".275 Rigby" prior to recent articles by American gun writers, and may be a misunderstanding of British rifle nomenclature. Rigby sold their rifles as the "Rigby-Mauser system" and historical references to .275 Rigby-Mauser rifles may have been misconstrued. Other references to the 7mm Mauser in ammunition catalogues of the pre-WW2 period list .275 Rigby ammunition - but this specifically refers to the Rigby brand of ammunition they sold in a high velocity loading and is not the name of the cartridge itself. Rigby themselves only packaged their ammunition or marked their rifles as .275 Bore. The cartridge has also been referred to as the .276 caliber and 7mm interchangeably.

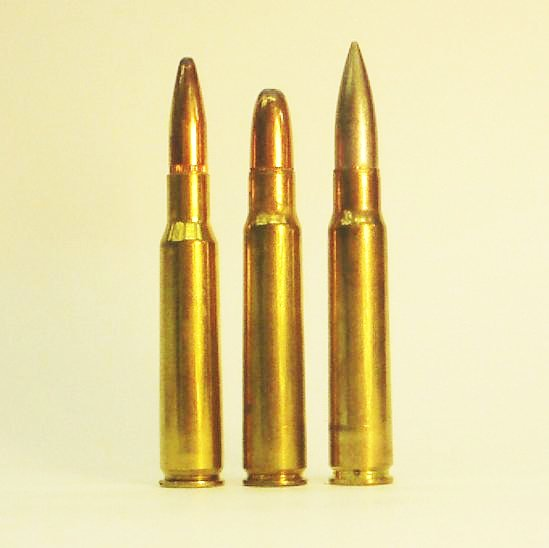
A modern 7 mm Mauser cartridge next to two 7.92 mm Mauser cartridges (FMJ round nose and spitzer bullets)

== History ==
Paul Mauser visited the Kingdom of Spain in 1892 after the delivery of trial rifles in 1891 and brought with him a new rifle designed to use a new cartridge of 7 mm caliber. Judging by the dimensions of the casing, it was developed from Mauser's Patrone 88 adopted into German service: in fact, its derivative, 6.5×57mm Mauser, was marketed as M88/57/6.5 mit und ohne Rand in a 1921 catalog. Like the 7.65×53mm Mauser introduced in 1889, he had developed the 7×57mm Mauser cartridge for use with the new smokeless propellant, introduced as Poudre B in the 1886 pattern 8×50mmR Lebel, which started a military rifle ammunition revolution. At the time of its development 7×57mm Mauser was a high-performance smokeless-powder cartridge.

The Mauser Model 1892 rifle turned out to be a transitional design that was manufactured in limited numbers for the Spanish Army. It was quickly improved to the Mauser Model 1893 featuring a new internal box magazine where the cartridges were stored in a staggered column. The Spaniards were so impressed with the Mauser Model 1892 and 1893 rifles and their new 7×57mm Mauser cartridge that they not only ordered rifles and ammunition from Mauser, but also awarded him the Grand Cross of the Spanish Military Order of Merit, the highest decoration Mauser ever received.

== Cartridge dimensions ==
The 7×57mm cartridge has 3.90 ml (60 grains H_{2}O) cartridge case capacity. The exterior shape of the case was designed to promote reliable case feeding and extraction in bolt-action rifles and machine guns alike, under extreme conditions.

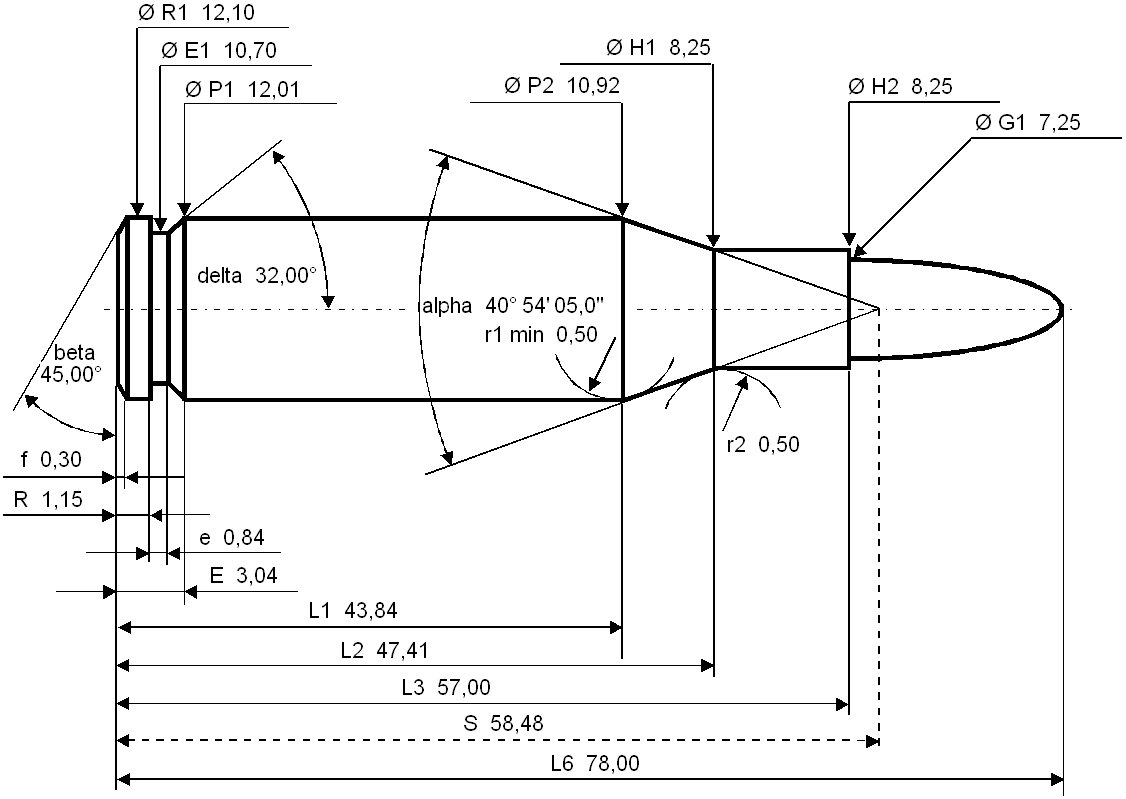

7×57mm maximum C.I.P. cartridge dimensions. All sizes in millimeters (mm).

Americans would define the shoulder angle at alpha/2 ≈ 20.55 degrees. The common rifling twist rate for this cartridge is 220 mm (1 in 8.66 in), 4 grooves, diameter of lands = 6.98 mm (0.275 in), diameter of grooves = 7.24 mm (0.285 in), land width = 3.90 mm (0.154 in) and the primer type is large rifle.

European 7 mm cartridges all have 7.24 mm (0.285 in)-diameter grooves. American 7 mm cartridges have 7.21 mm (0.284 in)-diameter grooves.

According to the official C.I.P. (Commission Internationale Permanente pour l'Epreuve des Armes à Feu Portatives) rulings, the 7×57mm case can handle up to 390.00 MPa (56,565 psi) P_{max} piezo pressure. In C.I.P. regulated countries every rifle-cartridge combo has to be proofed at 125% of this maximum C.I.P. pressure to certify for sale to consumers.

The SAAMI maximum average pressure (MAP) for this cartridge is 51,000 psi (351.63 MPa) piezo pressure or 46,000 CUP. This lower specification is in deference to the Remington Rolling block rifles that may still be in circulation. Concerns regarding the early Mauser rifles such as the models 93 and 95 are misplaced, as the original ammunition issued with the M93 Spanish Mauser produced an average pressure of 50,370 CUP in those rifles.

== 7×57mmR (rimmed) ==
A rimmed cartridge was developed from the 7×57mm shortly after its introduction for use in break-action rifles and combination guns. A rimmed cartridge greatly simplifies the issues of designing an extractor, particularly in a combination gun or "drilling" which must also be designed to extract rimmed shotgun shells. While various modern break-action and single-shot rifle and pistol designs have been developed that can reliably extract rimless cartridges, most of these date from the 1970s or later. While the external dimensions of the two versions are nearly identical other than the rim, there are differences in the internal design. In particular, the cartridge web, the area immediately above the rim on the rimmed version or the rebate on the rimless version, is thinner in the rimmed case, and some authorities recommend limiting the rimmed cartridge to 41,000 CUP because of this.

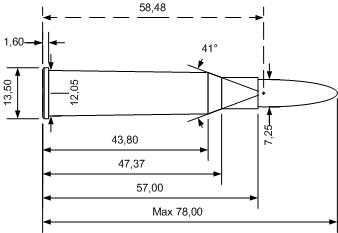

7×57mmR cartridge dimensions. All sizes in millimeters (mm).

== Sporting round ==
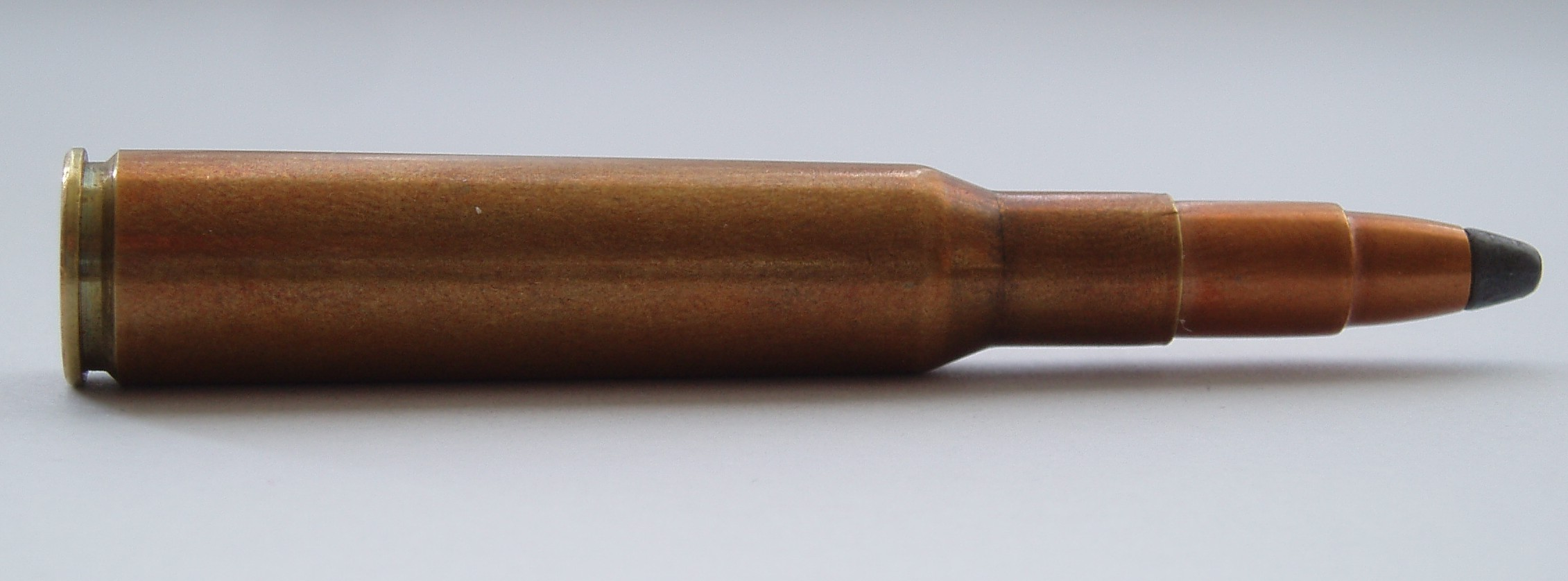
7×57mm hunting cartridge

The ballistics of the 7×57mm became popular with deer and plains game hunters. The relatively flat trajectory and manageable recoil ensured its place as a sportsman's cartridge. The cartridge became a standard chambering for British sportsmen and on deer estates (along with the 6.5x54 Mannlicher) for hunting red deer in the United Kingdom.

The 7×57mm can offer very good penetrating ability due to a fast twist rate that enables it to fire long, heavy bullets with a high sectional density. This made it popular in Africa, where it was used on animals up to and including elephants, for which it was particularly favoured by noted ivory hunter W.D.M. "Karamojo" Bell, who shot about 800 African elephants with 1893 pattern 7×57mm military ball ammunition using Rigby Mauser 98 rifles, when most ivory hunters were using larger-caliber rifles. Bell selected the cartridge for moderate recoil, and relied on the 11.2-gram (172.8 gr) long round-nosed military full metal jacket bullets for penetration.

The 7×57mm was also the favored cartridge of Eleanor O'Connor, wife of famous hunter and author Jack O'Connor. Eleanor accompanied her husband on multiple hunting expeditions all over the world, killing small and large game with the 7×57mm. Jack O'Connor also made extensive use of the round and remarked that "I think I have seen more game killed with fewer shots from this modest little cartridge than with any other." Though not as popular today, the 7×57mm is still produced by most major ammunition manufacturers and many modern rifles are available chambered for the cartridge. The cartridge is more popular in Europe than in the United States and most European gunmakers chamber rifles in 7×57mm. (Although they don't export them to the USA.)

The 7×57mm round was also used by the Indian hunter and conservationist Jim Corbett to put down the infamous man-eating Leopard of Rudraprayag besides a few other Man-Eaters of Kumaon. Corbett's writings mention using the .275 in a Rigby-made Mauser 1898 sporting rifle with attached torch to despatch the leopard on a dark summer night in May 1926. For man-eating tigers, Corbett preferred the .450/400 Nitro Express cartridge in a double-barreled configuration from W.J. Jeffery & Co as the .400 Jeffery Nitro Express rifle but retained the Rigby Mauser as a backup weapon. The rifle used by Corbett was acquired by the gunmaker.

The 7×57 is able to handle a wide range of projectile weights, is easy to reload, has relatively mild recoil, and is accurate. Some rifle metallic silhouette shooters use 7×57.

== Military use ==
The military of the Kingdom of Spain adopted the Mauser Model 1893 rifle. It was chambered for the new 7×57mm Mauser cartridge. The original cartridge featured a long, 11.2-gram (173 gr) round-nose, full-metal-jacketed bullet with a muzzle velocity of about 700 m/s (2,300 ft/s) with 2,744 J (2,024 ft⋅lbf) muzzle energy from a 740 mm (29.1 in) barreled rifle. For the late 19th century, these ballistics were impressive, and the loading provided a fairly flat trajectory combined with excellent penetration. At the same time, it exhibited relatively modest free recoil. That was a combination of attributes that made it popular with both soldiers and sportsmen alike.

The qualities of the 7×57mm as a military round were shown in the Spanish–American War of 1898. At the commencement of the American assault on the strategic Cuban city of Santiago, 750 Spanish troops defended positions on San Juan and Kettle hills. The attacking force numbered approximately 6,600 American soldiers, most of them armed with new smokeless-powder Krag–Jørgensen rifles in .30-40 Krag caliber, and supported by artillery and Gatling gun fire. Though the assault was successful, the Americans suffered more than 1,400 casualties, nearly 20 per cent of their forces. A U.S. board of investigation later concluded that the casualties were primarily due to the superior firepower of the Spanish Model 1893 Mauser rifles.

During the Second Boer War in South Africa, British authorities were obliged to re-evaluate rifle and ammunition design and tactics after facing Boer sharpshooters and snipers armed with Mauser Model 1893 rifles and Mauser Model 1895 rifles firing 7×57mm rounds with withering effectiveness, easily outranging the .303 British cartridge as regarding accurate long-range fire. The .303 British cartridge at that time was still using cordite propellant, in contrast to the Mauser's higher-performance ballistite type smokeless powder.

== Military ammunition ==
The oldest 1893 pattern military ball ammunition was loaded with an 11.2-gram (172.8 gr) long round-nosed bullet fired at a muzzle velocity of 670 m/s (2,198 ft/s) with 2,514 J (1,854 ft⋅lbf) muzzle energy from a 589 mm (23.2 in) long barrel. It had a maximum range of 3,250 m (3,554 yd). In 1893 this ballistic performance made it the high-performance service cartridge champion of its day when compared to other 1893 pattern smokeless-powder cartridges such as the 8mm Lebel, .303 British, and 8×50mmR Mannlicher.

In 1913, following the lead of French and German Army commands in developing the spitzer or pointed-tip bullet shape, the Spanish ordnance authorities issued a redesigned 7×57mm cartridge with a spitzer bullet (7 mm Cartucho para Mauser Tipo S). It was loaded with a 9-gram (138.9 gr) spitzer bullet fired at a muzzle velocity of 850 m/s (2,789 ft/s) with 3,251 J (2,398 ft⋅lbf) muzzle energy from a 589 mm (23.2 in) long barrel. It had a maximum range of 3,700 m (4,046 yd). The new spitzer bullet style was partially responsible for the cartridge's improved performance as it significantly reduced air drag within normal combat ranges and withstood higher accelerations in the barrel. Reverse engineering the trajectory from the previous sentence indicates a ballistic coefficient (G1 BC) of approximately 0.33.

After that, military ball ammunition loaded with a 10.5-gram (162.0 gr) spitzer bullet fired at a muzzle velocity of 750 m/s (2,461 ft/s) with 2,953 J (2,178 ft⋅lbf) muzzle energy from a 589 mm (23.2 in) long barrel became available. Besides a pointed nose, this projectile also had a boat tail to reduce drag. It had a maximum range of 5,000 m (5,468 yd). Reverse engineering the trajectory from the previous sentence indicates a ballistic coefficient (G1 BC) of approximately 0.54.

== Military users ==
At one time, the 7×57mm Mauser cartridge saw widespread military use. It was used by:

- Austria-Hungary:User Repetiergewehr M.14. in WWI
- Bolivia
- Brazil
- Chile
- China
- Costa Rica
- Cuba
- Colombia
- El Salvador
- Honduras
- Iran
- Mexico
- Orange Free State
- Paraguay
- First Philippine Republic
- Kingdom of Serbia
- Spain
- South African Republic
- United Kingdom
- Uruguay
- Venezuela

=== Chambered weapons ===
- Mauser Model 1893
- Mauser Model 1895 and Mauser Model 1899
- Mauser Model 1907
- Mauser Model 1908
- Mauser Standardmodell
- vz. 24
- Mendoza 1911 machine gun
- Mondragón rifle
- FN Mauser M1930
- Remington Rolling Block
- Venezuelan FN Model 1949
- M1895 Colt–Browning machine gun
- Hotchkiss Model 1922 machine gun
- Madsen machine gun
- SIG KE7
- FN Model D
- Colt R75 Browning Automatic Rifle model 1925
- M1941 Johnson
- FA Trapote m/33
- Type 3 heavy machine gun
- ZB vz.26

== Use as a parent case ==
6.5×57mm Mauser was created by Paul Mauser himself by necking down the 7×57mm already in 1890s. 5.6×57mm was created by RWS in 1960s in a similar way. Both cartridges also have rimmed variants for break-action hunting rifles, 6.5×57mmR and 5.6×57mmR respectively.

The .257 Roberts uses the 7×57mm Mauser as its parent cartridge. The 6mm Remington is also based on the 7×57mm Mauser cartridge.

The 7×57mm Mauser was also the parent case of the 6×57mm Mauser developed in 1895.

== Wildcats ==
The 7×57mm Mauser is also used as the parent case for a host of modified variants that are not officially registered with or sanctioned by C.I.P. or its American equivalent, SAAMI. These cartridges are known as wildcat cartridges. The US wildcat cartridge developer P.O. Ackley developed several 7×57mm Mauser based wildcat cartridges.
The 7×57mm Mauser Ackley Improved is an alternate version of the 7×57mm Mauser cartridge with 40 degree shoulder. This wildcat was designed to be easily made by rechambering existing firearms, and fire forming the ammunition to decrease body taper and increase shoulder angle, resulting in a higher case capacity with the trade-off of a smaller bullet. Reloading dies for this wildcat chambering are readily available.
The .228 Ackley Magnum is also based on the 7×57mm Mauser cartridge but is also necked down to .228 caliber (5.79 mm). Bullets in this caliber are hard to find but provide greater weight than .223 caliber bullets, up to 100 grains (6.5 g), without excessively quick twist rate.
The .257 Roberts Ackley Improved is a second generation wildcat cartridge based on the .257 Roberts cartridge.

== See also ==
- List of rifle cartridges
- Table of handgun and rifle cartridges
- 7 mm caliber

== Bibliography ==
- De Haas, Frank; Zwoll, Wayne (2003). Bolt Action Rifles. Iola: Krause Publications. ISBN 978-0-87349-660-5.
- Sams, Stanhope (August 1, 1898). "The Krag-Jorgensen Gun: It Is Inferior In Many Respects To The Mauser Used By The Spaniards" (PDF). The New York Times.
- C.I.P. decisions, texts and tables (free current C.I.P. CD-ROM version download (ZIP and RAR format))
