= Gongxian Arsenal =

Chinese military factory

Gongxian Arsenal (simplified Chinese: 巩县兵工厂; traditional Chinese: 鞏縣兵工廠; pinyin: Gǒngxiàn Bīnggōngchǎng) was an arsenal located in Gong County, Henan (now Gongyi). During the Second Sino-Japanese War the arsenal was a major producer of small arms for Chinese forces.

== History ==
In 1914, Yuan Shikai, then President of the Republic of China, personally planned the Gongxian Arsenal. At that time, the purpose was to increase the military strength of the Beiyang Army and unify the weapons manufacturing industry. Due to its advantageous geographical location and abundant resources such as coal, bauxite and clay, the Ordnance Industry Supervision Office in Beijing decided in 1915 to build a large military factory mainly producing ammunition and guns. Arsenal construction was supervised by Admiral Sa Zhenbing, assisted by military engineers from Germany, Denmark and other countries; manufacturing machines were ordered from a military factory in Connecticut, and a 10-km long and 20-meter deep "air-raid shelter" was built to protect personnel. In 1919 (the eighth year of the Republic of China), it was officially put into production and became one of the four largest arsenals in China at that time. Later, with the death of Yuan Shikai, the Gongxian Arsenal became the focus of competition among the warlords.

In 1922 it was under the control of Wu Peifu and the arsenal received new equipment from Niles, Bement and Dord of New York. In April 1922 Wu arranged for two French engineers to inspect the arsenal to determine if it could be used to manufacture airplanes. War intervened and Wu out the arsenal to work producing rifle ammunition, though as it had previously specialised in artillery shells twelve boxes of machinery had to be transported by rail from Hanyang, arriving on 4 October 1924.

In 1930, after the Central Plains War, the Northern Expeditionary Army under Chiang Kai-Shek occupied Gongxian County, and the arsenal was place under the management of the National Government. In 1938, the Gongxian Arsenal was bombed by Japanese aircraft; the fifth factory for rifles was in ruins and production was suspended. After the start of the Battle of Zaoyi in May 1940, Zhang Zizhong, commander-in-chief of the 33rd Group Army and commander-in-chief of the Right-wing Corps of the Fifth Theater, was killed in action, and on June 12 the Japanese army occupied Yichang. The Gongxian Arsenal was ordered to relocate to Chongqing. Due to the occupation of Yichang by the Japanese army, the Gongxian Arsenal could not be completely removed. In 1948, some of the factories remaining in Chenxi were ordered to move to Dongjiayuan, Zhuzhou, Hunan to prepare for the construction of a new factory. With the second civil war military defeat, on May 19, 1949, more than 2,000 employees moved to the Hainan Yulin plant. In March 1950, the Yulin factory moved to Kaohsiung, Taiwan, and merged into the 60th arsenal.

== Firearms produced ==
- Type 88 rifle
- Type 24 Chiang Kai-Shek rifle
- Type 4 rifle
- Mauser C96 pistols in 7.63mm and 7.65mm caliber
- ZB vz.26
