= Hanyang Arsenal =

Chinese military factory

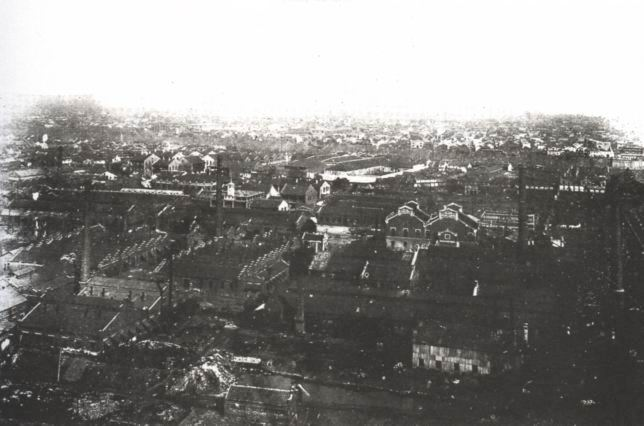
Photograph of the Hanyang arsenal

Hanyang Arsenal (traditional Chinese: 漢陽兵工廠; simplified Chinese: 汉阳兵工厂; pinyin: Hànyáng Bīnggōngchǎng) was one of the largest and oldest modern arsenals in Chinese history, located in its namesake Hanyang County.

== History ==
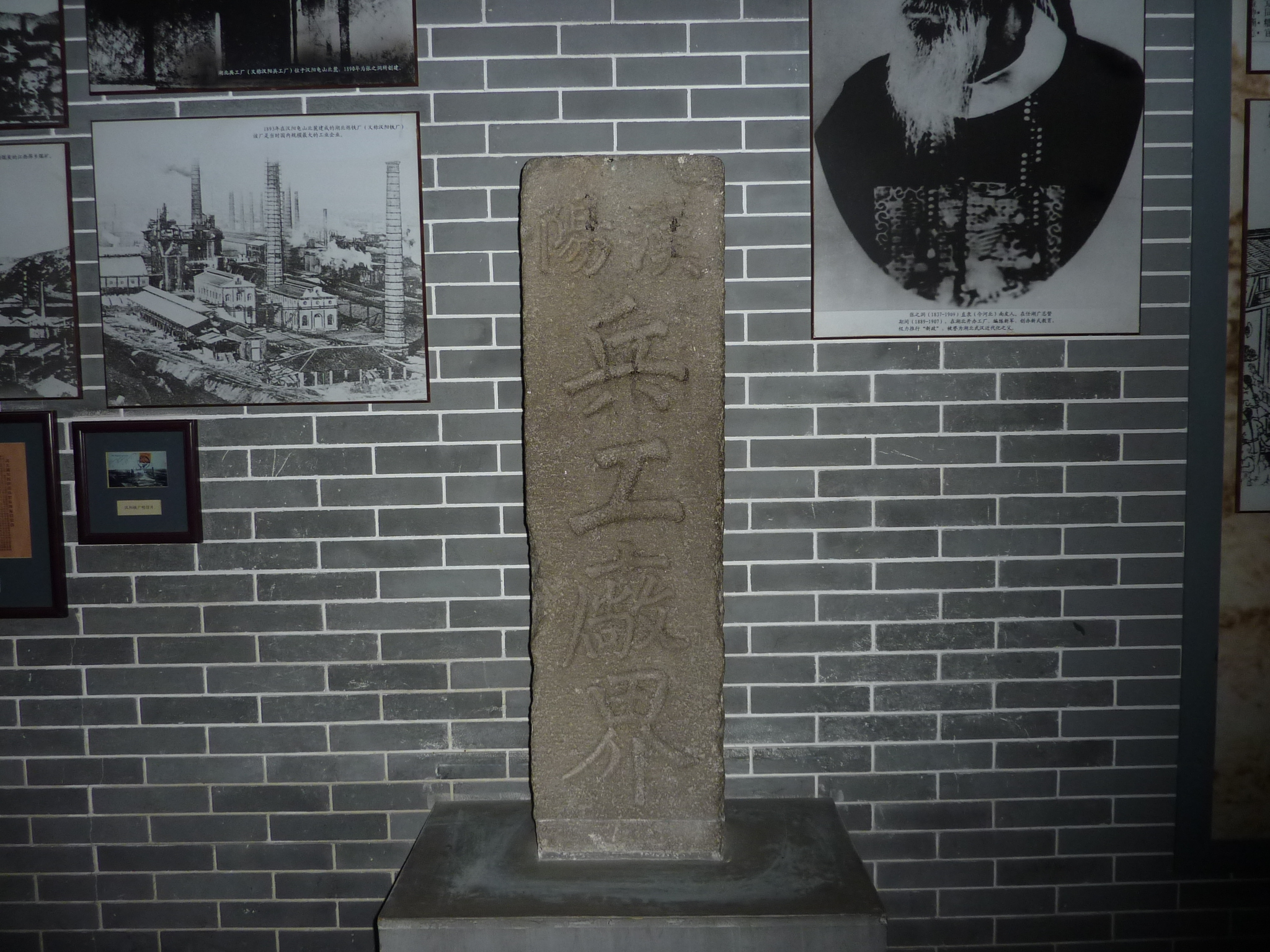
A boundary marker from the arsenal. Presently on display in the Xinhai Revolution Museum, Wuhan.

Originally known as the Hubei Arsenal, it was founded in 1891 by Qing official Zhang Zhidong, who diverted funds from the Nanyang Fleet in Guangdong to build the arsenal. It cost about 250,000 pounds sterling and was built in 4 years. On 23 April 1894, construction was completed and the arsenal, occupying some 40 acres (160,000 m^{2}), could start production of small-caliber cannons. It built magazine-fed rifles, Gruson quick fire guns, and cartridges.

On 14 June 1894, only months after the arsenal was constructed, an industrial accident started a fire in the arsenal that destroyed all the equipment and most of the structures in the arsenal, $1,000,000 in damages were reported. In July of the same year rebuilding began, and in August 1895, all was back to normal, and the arsenal started production of German M1888 Commission rifles, locally called 7.92cm Type 88 Mauser rifle (even though the Commission rifle was unrelated to the Mauser). Today, these rifles are known as the Hanyang 88 or Type 88 rifle (which was patterned from the Gewehr 88 design) At the same time, ammunition for the rifle were being produced at a rate of 13,000 rounds per month.

500,000 taels were spent annually in the arsenal, which constructed Mauser rifles and used steel from the works around Hanyang. Iron and coal mines surrounded the area. 160,000 Mausers were purchased by the Chinese military, along with mountain guns and small caliber versions. Smokeless powder was produced for guns at a factory next to the arsenal. The arsenal itself built 40 Mausers a day, 6 field guns a month. Every day the following was manufactured: 300 shells, 35,000 rifle cartridges, 1,000 pounds smokeless powder. They were moved via the Yangtze river until reaching Wuchang. Fortifications across China in the interior and on the coast received these weapons.

During the Boxer Uprising of 1900, the arsenal supplied the Boxers with more than 3,000 rifles and 1 million rounds of ammunition.

In 1904, the arsenal made several modifications to the design of the Type 88, and, at the same time, expanded production capacity to 50 rifles and 12,000 rounds of ammunition per day. For a time in 1910, the arsenal switched to producing the Type 68 rifle, at a rate of 38 per day.

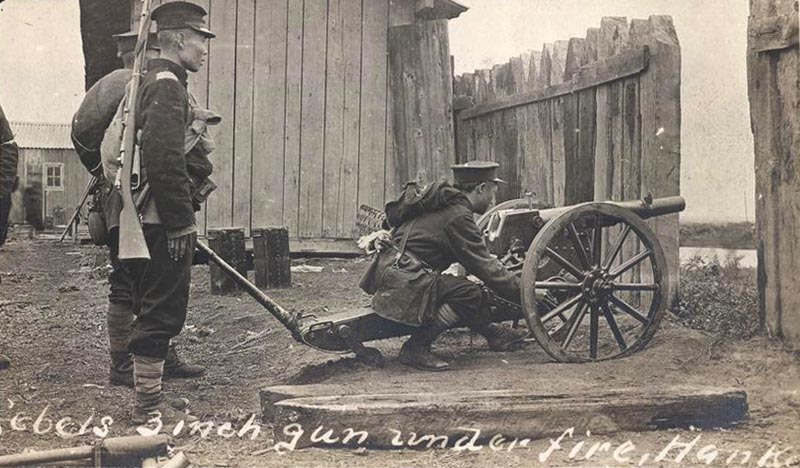
A 57 mm cannon built by the Hangyang Arsenal.

The quality of the firearms produced in this period was generally low, because the local steel foundries were often ill-equipped and badly managed.

Because of its proximity to Wuchang, the revolutionaries, during the Wuchang Uprising of the Xinhai Revolution, largely equipped themselves with foreign and locally made weapons stored at this arsenal – some 7,000 rifles, 5 million rounds, 150 pack guns and 2,000 shells. The arsenal, in support of the revolution, switched into full gear and began producing weapons and ammunition day and night.

The Republic of China expanded the arsenal numerous times, and production soared. Quality, however, remained low. In 1917, a training school was established alongside the arsenal. In 1921, production began on copies of the Browning M1917 and the Mauser M1932 "Broomhandle" pistol. In 1930, the design of the Type 88 was once again modified, extending the bayonet. In 1935, a version of the Maxim gun—the Type 24 HMG—was being produced, based on blueprints from the German M08.

As the Imperial Japanese Army approached Hanyang and Wuhan in 1938, the arsenal was forced to move to Hunan, with parts of its assets transferred to various other arsenals across the country. At Hunan, it continued production of the Type 88 rifle and carbine, and also the Chinese version of the Mauser Standardmodell, the Chiang Kai-shek rifle otherwise known as the Type Chungcheng style rifle.

With the Allies' victory in 1945, orders to the arsenal gradually stopped, and on 1 July 1947, the arsenal was shut down. Much of the arsenal tooling was moved to Chongqing, where it provided the foundation for later arms production there, with Chongqing Jianshe being one of these manufacturing concerns. Many of the senior employees transferred to Taiwan and built the basis of today's Taiwanese arsenals. When the Communists took over, they relocated the arsenal's remnants southeast across the Yangtze near the White Cloud Cave recreational area and renamed it to the "3303 Arsenal".

== Firearms produced ==
- Type 88 rifle
- Type 68 rifle
- Type 24 Chiang Kai-Shek rifle
- Type 24 HMG
- Mauser C96 pistols in 7.63mm and 7.65mm caliber
- Type 30 machine gun
- The General Liu rifle, an early semi-automatic rifle, was to be produced at Hanyang, but only a small number of prototypes were actually made.

== See also ==
- Chinese Civil War
- Second Sino-Japanese War
- Self-Strengthening Movement
- Sino-German cooperation (1926–1941)
- Taiyuan Arsenal
- Foochow Arsenal
- Great Hsi-Ku Arsenal
- Jiangnan Shipyard
