= Mauser Model 1904 =

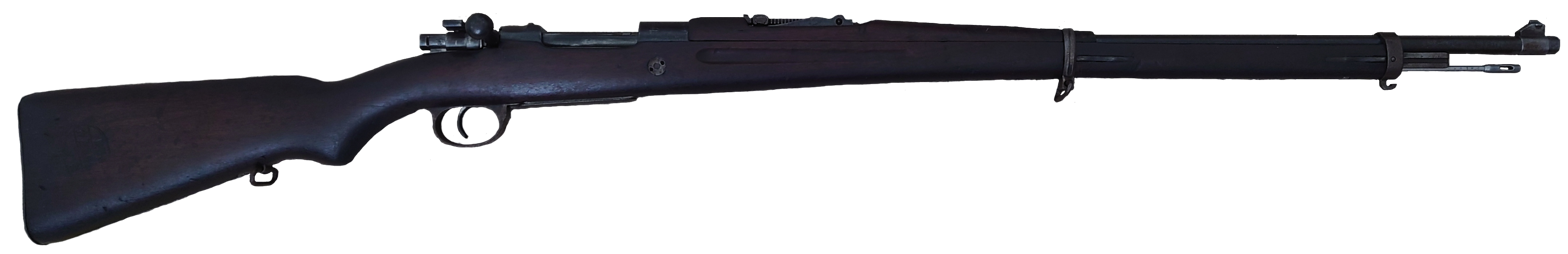
- The Chinese-made Type 4 Rifle
- Type: Bolt-action rifle
- Place of origin: Imperial Germany

Service history
- In service: 1905 — Present
- Used by: See Users
- Wars: World War I; Chaco War; Second Sino-Japanese War; Chinese Civil War

Production history
- Designed: 1904
- Manufacturer: Mauser; DWM; Various Chinese arsenals; Oviedo
- Produced: 1905–1935

Specifications
- Mass: 3.76 kilograms (8.3 lb) (Chinese Model 1907)
- Length: 125 centimetres (49 in) (Chinese Model 1907)
- Barrel length: 74.0 centimetres (29.1 in) (Chinese Model 1907)
- Cartridge: 6.8×57mm Mauser; 7×57mm Mauser; 7.65×53mm Mauser; 7.92×57mm Mauser
- Action: Bolt-action
- Feed system: 5-round stripper clip, internal magazine
- Sights: Iron sights adjustable to 2,000 metres (2,200 yd)

The Mauser Model 1904 and Model 1907 were Gewehr 98 pattern bolt-action rifles produced by Mauser and Deutsche Waffen und Munitionsfabriken (DWM). They were designed for export market. Copies were later produced in China and in Spain.

== Design ==
The Models 1904 and 1907 were similar to the Gewehr 1898. They featured a longer cocking piece. Only the rifles made for Paraguay kept the Lange Visier sight of the German rifle. While most of the rifles were fitted only with a short bayonet lug that required a bayonet with a muzzle ring, rifles ordered by Paraguay and Ecuador had another lug to fit the Mauser Model 1895 bayonet. The Siamese model was heavier and slightly longer.

== Variants ==
=== Brazilian carbine version ===
The Brazilian military police ordered a carbine variant, with a bent bolt handle. A bayonet lug was fitted under the barrel band, similarly to the Mauser Model 1893.

=== Paraguayan and Chinese carbines ===
These carbines generally featured turned down bolt handle, even if some Chinese carbines had a straight one. The stock ended under the muzzle. The carbines also had a tangent leaf rear sight while the front sight was directly mounted on the nose cap. No bayonet could be used.

=== Chinese variants ===
China tested the Model 1904 from 1907. The rifle was known as Model 1904/1907 while the carbine was known as Model 1907. Most of the rifles were originally produced by Mauser and DWM with a special 6.8×57mm cartridge. The production of the Model 1907 soon started in Guangdong arsenal with DWM help. The 1911 revolution slowed the purchase of weapons and in 1914, thousand of 6.8mm Model 1907 rifles stored in Germany were chambered to the standard 7.92×57mm Mauser and pressed into service of the German Empire. Originally produced as the Guang Xu Type 33 during the Imperial rule, the newly formed Republic of China chose it as the standard rifle of the Chinese army as the Type 1 rifle, intended to replace the Hanyang 88. In 1915, the Chinese also decided to switch to the 7.92mm cartridge and the rifle was renamed Type 4 or 7.9mm Type 1. More than 200,000 were produced until 1935. The last factory producing them was the Gongxian Arsenal, where the guns were nicknamed Gong 98. While they had been replaced in most front-line units at the beginning of the Second Sino-Japanese War, the Type 4 rifles were kept in regular use with some units. They were still used by the Red Guards in the 1960s.

=== Mauser/Oviedo Model 1927 ===
The Spanish Fabrica Nacional de Armas, in Oviedo, produced a derivative of the Mauser 1907 for Paraguay. Three variants were produced: a long rifle (Fusil Modelo 1927), a short rifle (Mosqueton Modelo 1927) and a carbine (Carabina Modelo 1927). The bolt stop was extended to block the clips during the loading of the magazine, thus enabling the use of different models of clip. They had a tangent leaf sight while the upper hand guard of the rifle and short rifle was slightly extended. The short rifle did not feature a pistol grip and the carbine had a stock extended to the muzzle. The bolt handle was straight for the rifle and bent for the carbine, whereas the short rifle can be found with both types of bolt handles.

The Paraguayans wanted an affordable weapons, and the guns were reportedly of low quality. 10,363 were purchased from 1927 to 1932. They saw combat use during the Chaco War and performed poorly; according to the Paraguayan historian and general Samaniego, the rifles were even called "Mata Paraguayo" [Paraguayan Killer] by the troops for the MP engraving they had and their grave tendency to fail.

== Users ==
- Bolivia: ~4,000 Modelo 1907 rifles and 1,000 Model 1907 carbines made by DWM in 7.65×53mm Mauser, used during the Chaco War
- Brazil: 7mm DWM Model 1907 rifles. A Model 1907 carbine was also sold by DWM to the cavalry of the military police.
- Qing dynasty: Model 1907, Type 1
  - Republic of China: Type 4
  - People's Republic of China
- Colombia: DWM Model 1904
- Chile: 300 DWM Model 1907 short rifle
- Ecuador: Model 1907
- El Salvador: Model 1904
- German Empire: Chinese Model 1907
- Paraguay: Fusil Modelo 1907 Paraguayo, Carabina Mauser Paraguayana Mo. 1907, Fusil Modelo 1927, Mosqueton Modelo 1927 and Carabina Modelo 1927, all used during the Chaco War
- Persia: 1,500 Mauser Model 1904/1907
- Siam: slightly heavier and longer Mauser Model 1904
