= Mauser Model 1895 =

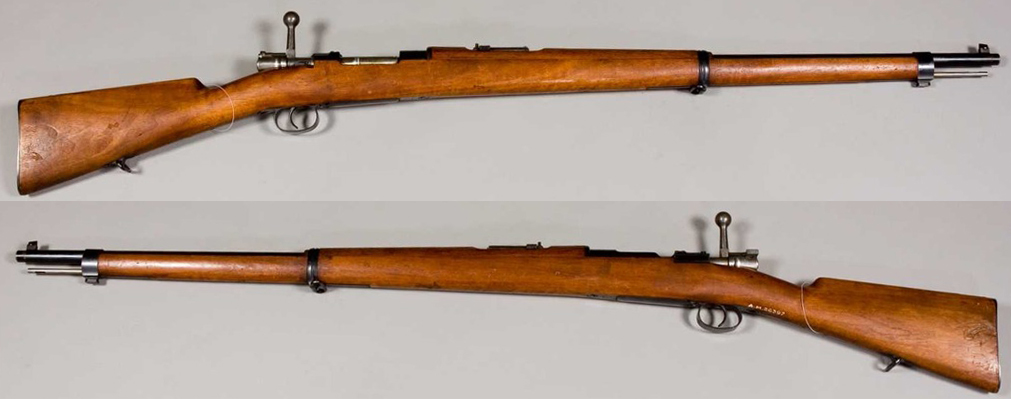
- Serbian M1899, almost identical to Chilean M1895.
- Type: Bolt-action rifle
- Place of origin: German Empire

Service history
- In service: 1895–1945
- Used by: See Users
- Wars: Spanish-American War; Second Boer War; World War I Mexican Revolution; Cristero War; Chaco War; World War II

Production history
- Designed: 1895
- Manufacturer: Ludwig Loewe & Company 1895–1896; Deutsche Waffen und Munitionsfabriken 1897–1909; Zastava Arms 1899–1915
- Produced: 1895–1915
- No. built: approx.1,800,000
- Variants: Mauser Model 1895 Short Rifle; Mauser Model 1895 Carbine

Specifications
- Mass: 3.9 kg (8.6 lb)
- Length: m/1895 Rifle: 1,220 mm (48 in) m/1895 Short: 1,046 mm (41.2 in) m/1895 Carbine: 947 mm (37.3 in)
- Barrel length: m/1895 Rifle: 740 mm (29 in) m/1895 Short: 540 mm (21 in) m/1895 Carbine: 465 mm (18.3 in)
- Cartridge: 7×57mm Mauser
- Action: Bolt-action
- Muzzle velocity: 700 m/s (2,297 ft/s)
- Effective firing range: 500 m (550 yd) with iron sights
- Feed system: 5-round stripper clip, internal magazine
- Sights: Iron sights.

The Mauser Model 1895 is a bolt operated magazine fed rifle using the 7×57mm Mauser cartridge. It was exported to many overseas powers, including the Chilean forces which adopted as the Fusil Mauser Chileno Modelo 1895. It is the first major modification of the Mauser Model 1893 and was produced by Deutsche Waffen und Munitionsfabriken, known as DWM, and its predecessor, the Ludwig Loewe Company from 1895 to 1900.

== History ==
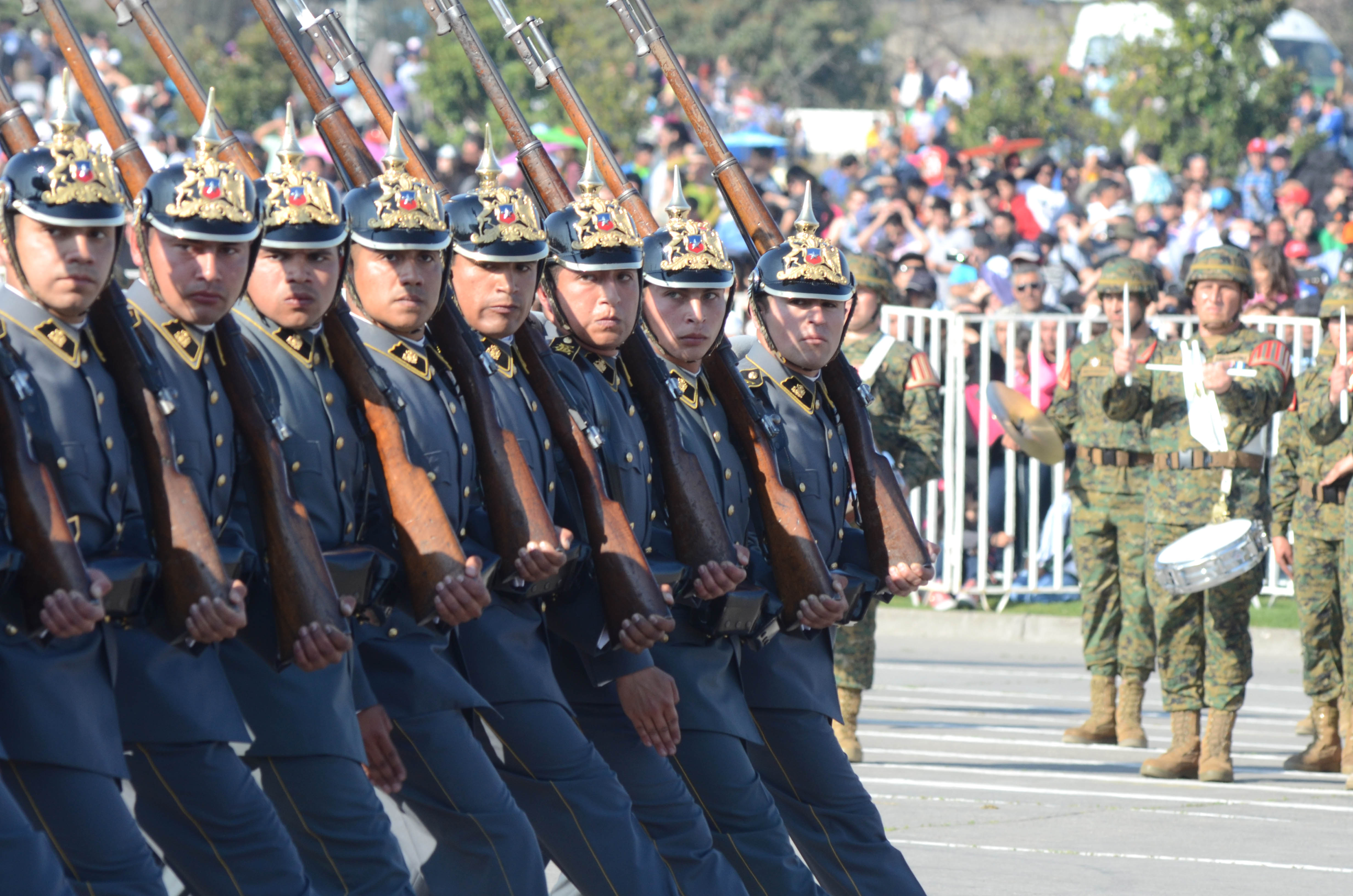
Chilean M1895 rifles during a military parade in 2014.

First supplied by the Ludwig Loewe & Co during 1895-1896 then later by the DWM (1897-1900), the Mauser model 1895 first made its appearance during a small arms race between Argentina and Chile in 1896 and 1898. In this period, over 80,000 Model 1895 rifles and 30,000 Model 1895 carbines were shipped and deployed to the Chilean army.

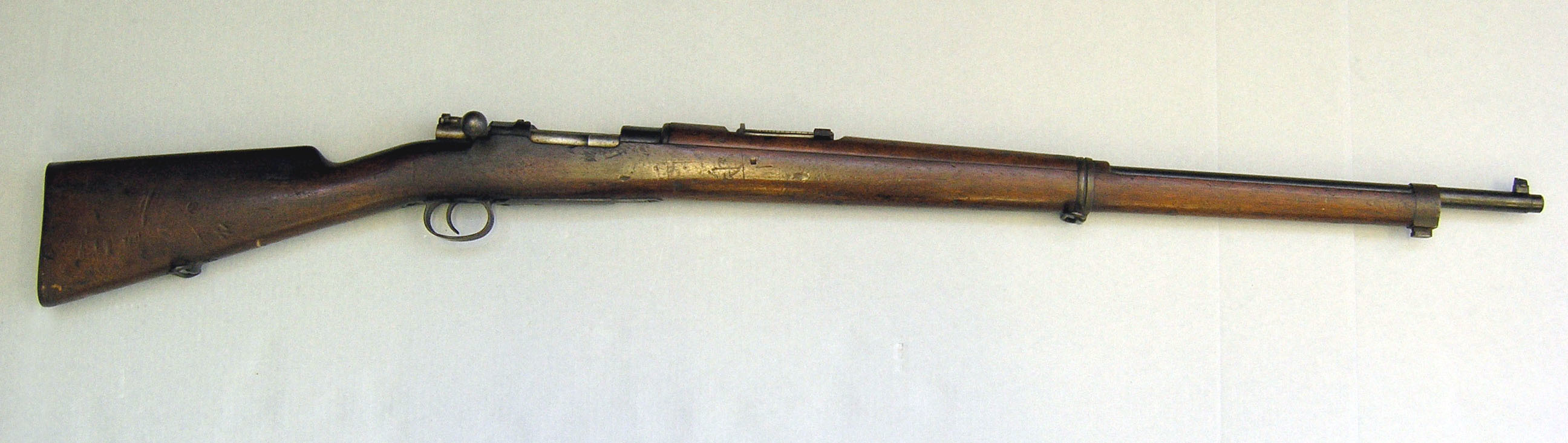
Mauser 1895, used by the Boers in South Africa; (at the Auckland Museum)

The Model 1895 was also deployed to republic of the Orange Free State (Oranje Vrij Staat) and the South African Republic (The Z.A.R. but more commonly known as the “Transvaal”) by Ludwig Loewe and Co. (and later DMW) shortly after the Jameson Raid in December 1895 to deal with the shortage of modern magazine fed rifles for the state army. Roughly 70,000 Mauser rifles were ordered but only 55,000 were delivered. Some of the undelivered rifles were diverted to Chile, and as a result many of the rifles in that country bore the inscription “O.V.S” (Oranje Vrij Staat), Orange Free State. The Model 1895 brought to the “Transvaal” was also known as "Boer Model" Mauser and those delivered to the Orange Free State (Oranje Vrij Staat) were marked “O.V.S.” just above the serial number accompanied. Rifles delivered to the Transvaal bore no state markings. All were marked “Mod. Mauser” followed by the date of manufacture. Because of this, a misunderstanding occurred regarding the identification between the Model 1896 and Model 1897. At the time, an Afrikaans farmer (also known as a Boer) could purchase a Mauser Model 1895 at a price of £3. Another variant known in Afrikaans as Plezier Mauser was sold slightly above cost by the respective governments and private dealers for sport and private use. These rifles varied in stock style, barrel, sight lines and ornamentation. Some of the last rifles delivered by DWM were equipped with turned down bolt handles which made them suitable for the South African farmers on horseback. Work on the manufacturing of the Mauser Model 1895 was halted in 1899 by the Second Boer War.

The Mauser Model 1895 also saw service in Mexico, Costa Rica, Paraguay, Iran, El Salvador and Honduras. Mauser Model 1895 rifles and carbines were the standard weapons of the various Mexican armies during the Mexican Revolution while the Paraguayan rifles saw combat during the Chaco War.

== Design ==
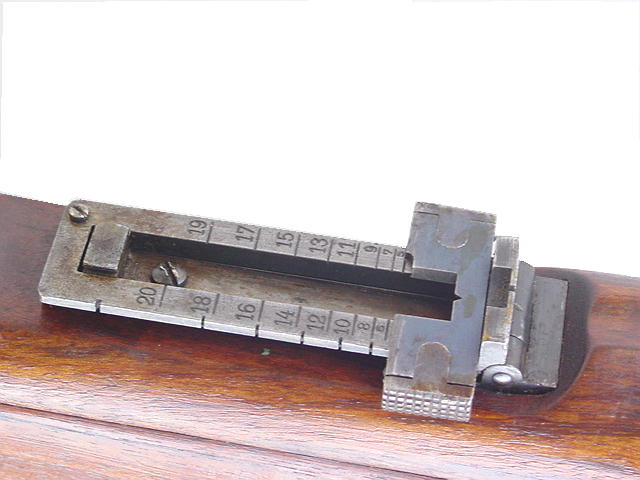
Mauser Model 1895 rear sight leaf

The Mauser Model 1895 is a modification of the Mauser Model 1893. The flush-mounted staggered column box magazine has a capacity of 5 smokeless powder 7×57mm Mauser cartridges. The internal magazine can be loaded with single rounds by pushing the cartridges into the receiver top opening or via stripper clips. Each stripper clip can hold 5 rounds to fill the magazine and is inserted into clip guides machined into the rear receiver bridge. After loading, the empty clip is ejected when the bolt is closed. The stock has a straight wrist and a handguard which stretches from the receiver ring to the lower barrel band. The upper band has a lug for the Model 1895 bayonet.

The Model 1895 differed from the Mauser Model 1893 with regards to the bolt face. The bolt face used in the Mauser Model 1893 was square whereas the Model 1895's was cylindrical, this is due to the fact that the square face was unnecessary for reliable feeding. But the rifles and carbines, supplied to the two Boer republics retained the square bolt face. In addition, the Model 1895 had an auxiliary shoulder behind the bolt handle in order to provide additional locking in case of bolt failure. The forward receiver ring diameter were the two forward locking lugs achieved lockup is 33 millimetres (1.30 in). Another major modification regarding the Model 1895 to the Model 1893 was the magazine follower, the tail of which was rounded so that the bolt could be closed on an empty chamber

The Mauser Model 1895 iron sight line had an open post type front sight, and a tangent-type rear sight with a rear notch. These standard sight lines consisted of somewhat coarse aiming elements making it suitable for rough field handling, aiming at distant area fire targets and low light usage, but less suitable for precise aiming at distant or small point targets. The rear tangent sight was graduated for 1893 pattern 7×57mm Mauser cartridges loaded with a 11.2-gram (172.8 gr) long round-nosed bullet from 400 to 2,000 m (437 to 2,187 yd) in 100 m (109 yd) increments.

== Variants ==
=== Model 1895 Short Rifle ===
Also known as the mosqueton, the Short Rifle is a slightly longer version of the carbine with an overall length of 41.2 in (1,046 mm), a 21.25 in (540 mm) barrel and a 1,400 m (1,531 yd) rear sight. The only other modifications are a bent bolt handle and sling swivels on the left side of the barrel band and stock.

=== Model 1895 Carbine ===
Also known as the Carabina Mauser Chilena Modelo 1895, this shortened variant was primarily designed for cavalry and artillery. This model is similar in design to the Mauser Model 1895 except for the fact that it is smaller. It is only 37.3 in (947 mm) long with an 18.3 in (465 mm) barrel. It was also closely related to the short rifle except that the sling swivels are on the left side of the barrel band and on the stock behind the wrist. It also has the same modified form of the bent bolt handle as the short rifle.

=== Serbian M1899 ===
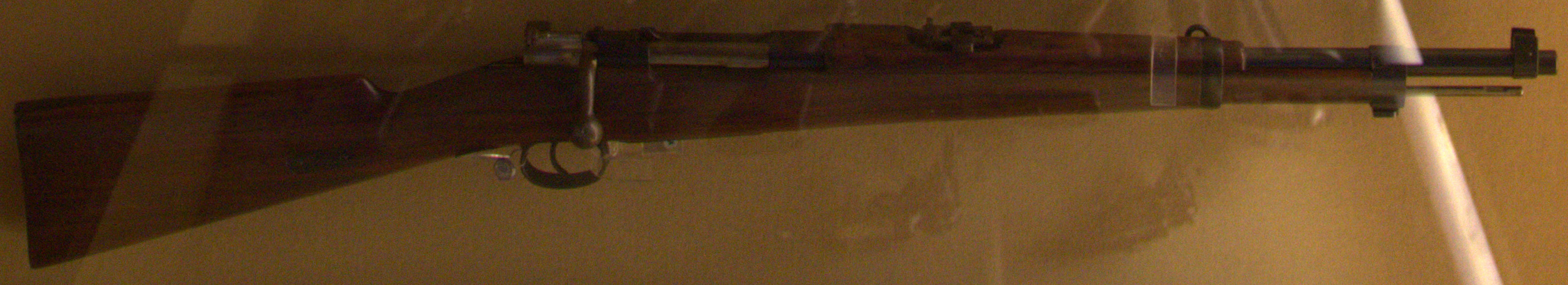
A Serbian M 99 C short rifle.

The Zastava M1899 in 7×57mm is a variant of the Mauser Model 1895, it was produced under license by Zastava Arms from 1899 to 1915. Depending on the slight modifications during the production, they were designated M1899, M1899/07 and M1899/08. 10,000 carbines, designated M1899/07 or M1907 were also produced by Zastava from 1907 to 1910. They were the standard service rifle of the Serbian Army during the Balkan Wars and World War I. Yugoslav used them as Puska 7 mm M 99 and Karabini 7 mm M 8 C. Before World War II, the M1899 long rifle was shortened and rechambered in 7.92×57mm to resemble the M24B short rifle. This version was designated Puska 7,9 mm M 99 C. The rifles captured by Nazi Germany were designated Gewehr 222 (j) (M99), Karabiner 421 (j) (M08C) and Gewehr 291/4 (j) (M99C).

== Users ==
- Chile
- (Qing dynasty) China
- Costa Rica
- Dominican Republic
- El Salvador
- Honduras
- Iran
- Mexico
- Orange Free State
- Paraguay
- (Kingdom of Serbia) Serbia
- South African Republic
- Uruguay

== See also ==
- List of firearms
- Spanish-American War
- Second Boer War
- Swedish Mauser
