= Chiang Kai-shek rifle =

Chinese bolt-action rifle

Type 24 / Type Zhongzheng
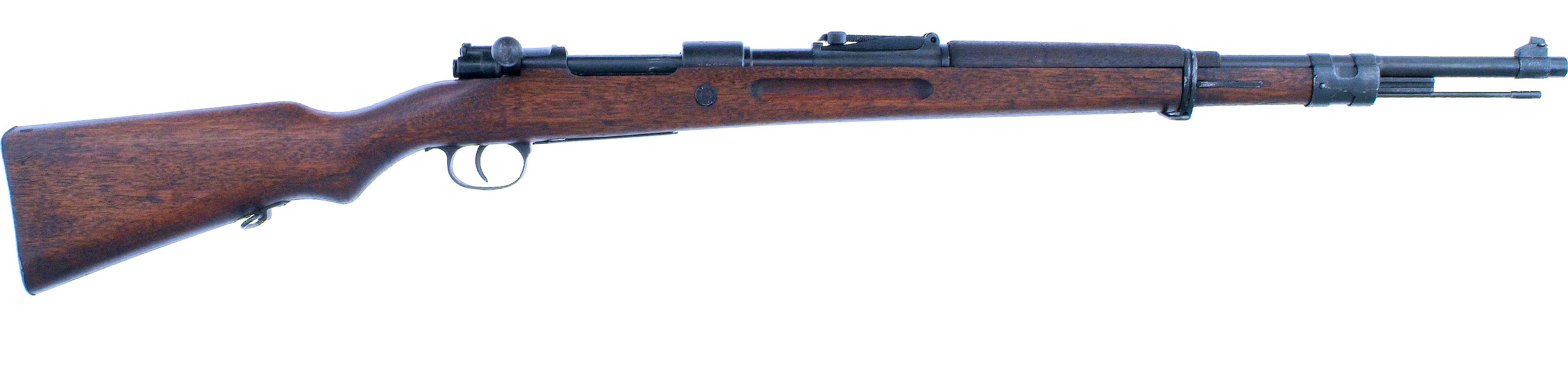
- Type Chiang Kai-shek rifle/Type 24 rifle
- Type: Bolt action rifle
- Place of origin: Republic of China

Service history
- In service: 1935–1980s
- Used by: See Users
- Wars: Chinese Civil War; Second Sino-Japanese War; World War II; First Indochina War; Korean War; Vietnam War; Laotian Civil War

Production history
- Designed: 1934
- Manufacturer: Gongxian, (Note: Sometimes known as Kung Hsien Arsenal in certain translations.) Hanyang, Jinling and Canton Arsenals
- Produced: 1935–1949
- No. built: ~600,000

Specifications
- Mass: 4.08 kg (9.0 lb)
- Length: 1,110 mm (44 in)
- Barrel length: 600 mm (24 in)
- Cartridge: 7.92×57mm Mauser
- Action: Bolt action
- Rate of fire: 15 rounds per minute
- Muzzle velocity: 810 m/s (2,657 ft/s)
- Effective firing range: 500 m (550 yd)
- Feed system: 5-round stripper clip, internal magazine

The Type Chiang Kai-shek rifle (Chinese: 中正式), also known as the Generalissimo rifle, and Type 24 (二四式), named after the Chinese Generalissimo Chiang Kai-shek, was a Chinese-made version of the German Standardmodell rifle, the forerunner of the Karabiner 98k. Preproduction of the Chiang Kai-shek rifle started in 1935 (year 24 of the Republican calendar, hence Type 24). It was designated the Type 79 by the Chinese Communists.

The rifle was in full-scale production as early as late 1935. However, full standardization for the production of the Type Chiang Kai-shek rifle only started during the Second Sino-Japanese War and the Hanyang 88 rifle was produced in greater numbers.

== History ==
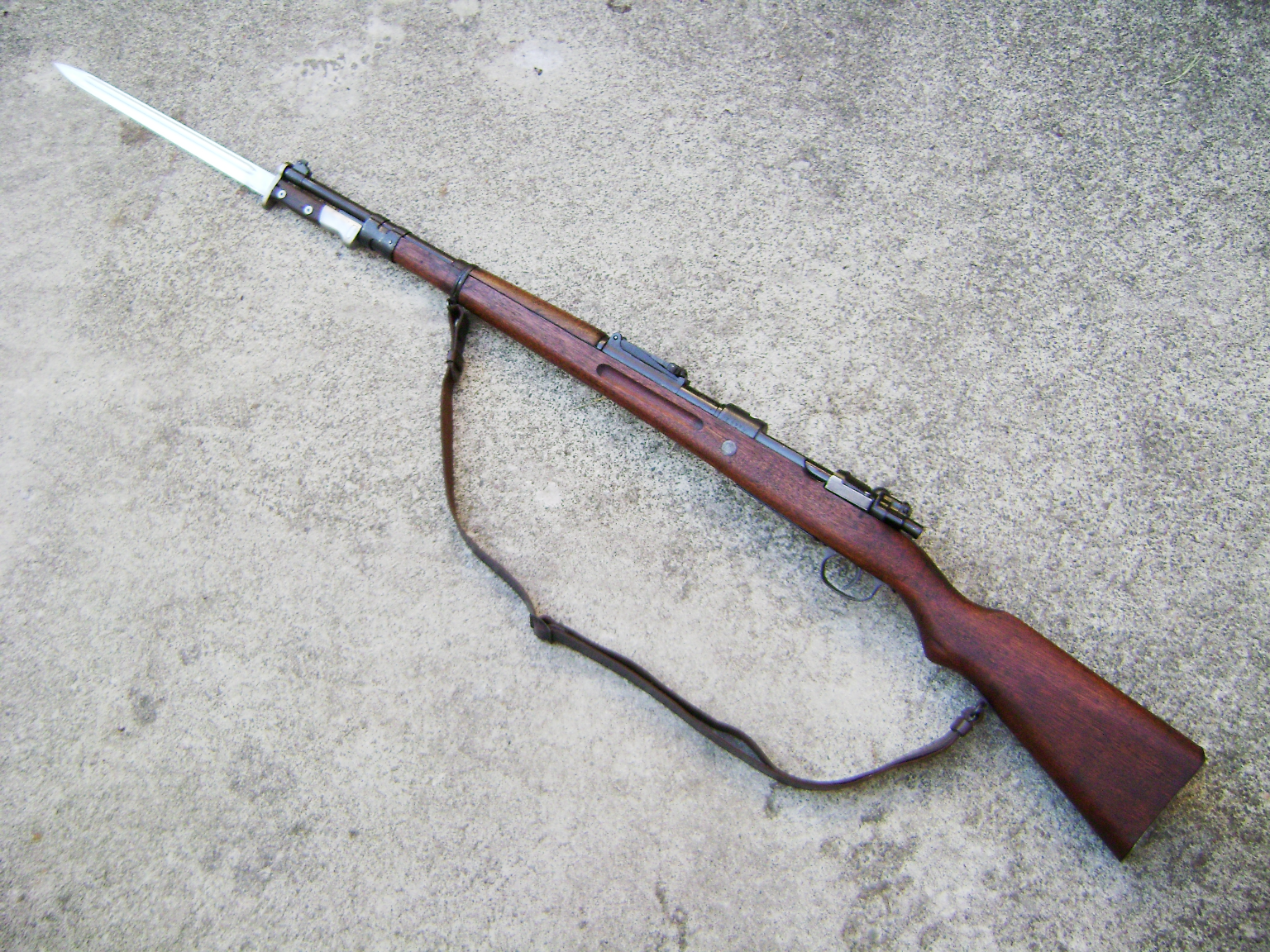
The Chinese Chiang Kai-shek rifle with the HY1935 bayonet

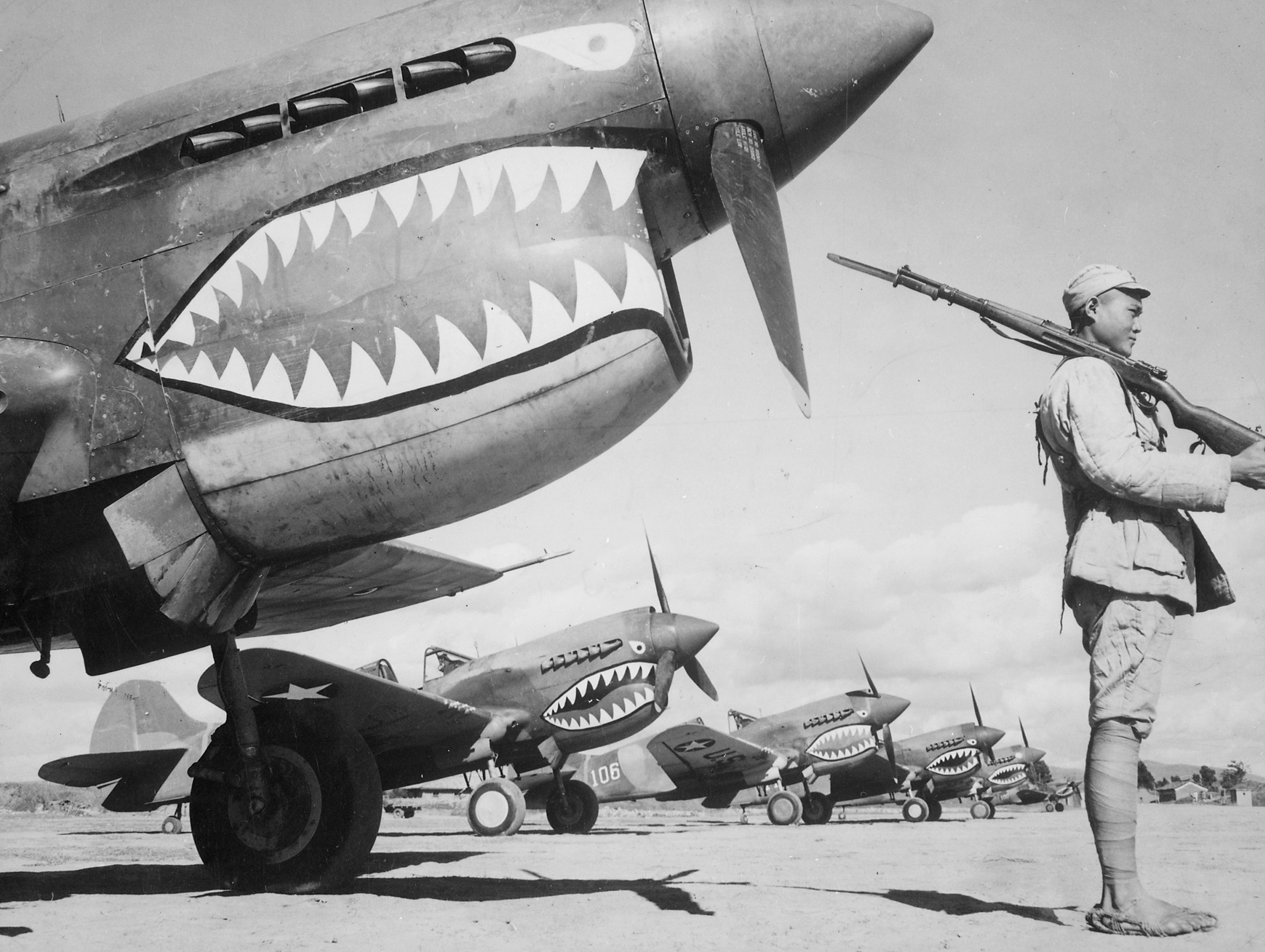
A National Revolutionary Army soldier armed with a Chiang Kai-shek rifle guarding P-40 fighter planes

The weapon served as one of the main service rifles for the Chinese National Revolutionary Army (NRA, or Nationalists). Like the Karabiner 98k, it was a shortened and lightened version of the Gewehr 98, specifically, the Oberndorf Export Mauser named Standardmodell. 10,000 had been bought by China in 1934 and the Germans provided the tooling to produce the Type 24. The 1934 materials proved to be incorrect and new tools were sent in early 1935.

Although it entered production at the Gongxian Arsenal in July 1935, China's limited industrial capacity meant that the rifle was built in relatively low numbers. The name of the rifle was changed from Type 24 to Type Chiang Kai-shek after a visit of the Generalissimo to the factory.

As the war progressed, however, China's industry in western cities like Chongqing and Kunming allowed more rifles to be produced, although quality controls persisted due to the need to move machinery in order to avoid being captured or destroyed by Japanese troops.

Together with the Mauser C96 handgun and the M35 Helmet, these weapons have become recognizable features of the Generalissimo's National Revolutionary Army during China's turbulent early 20th century. In an ironic twist, the rifle, although named after Chiang Kai-shek, was also heavily used by the Communists that he fought against during the Chinese Civil War.

Chinese Sergeant Tung Chih Yeh claimed to have shot and killed over 100 Imperial Japanese Army (IJA) soldiers using a Chiang Kai-shek rifle with and without a scope in the Yangtze area.

In 1941 the Chinese Communists produced copies of this rifle, dubbing them the Type 55 rifle in honour of Eighth Route Army Commander-in-chief Zhu De's (later Marshal) 55th birthday.

About 600,000 of all models were produced between 1935 and 1949, of which ~400,000 had been produced during the war.

By the end of the 1940s, the Type Chiang Kai-shek rifle was phased out from frontline service in favor of superior American aid equipment, such as the semiautomatic M1 Garand, M1 carbine, and Thompson submachine gun for the Nationalists. Despite being replaced by more modern infantry weapons, the Type Zhongzheng still served the ROC armed forces well into the 1970s as a rifle for reserve forces. The Type Zhongzheng Rifle (along with the American M1 Garand) is still used by the ROC Army as a ceremonial/parade rifle to this very day. The Chinese People's Volunteer Army used the Type Zhongzheng rifle during the Korean War alongside other small arms that were provided as military aid to the PRC by the Soviet Union. Among the weapons provided to Chinese Communist forces in Korea by the Soviet Union included Soviet capture Mauser Karabiner 98k rifles. The Type Zhongzheng rifle was also seen in the hands of the Viet Minh during the final stage at First Indochina War and of the Viet Cong during the Vietnam War.

The Chinese People's Militia were using Chiang Kai-shek rifles (as well as Arisakas, M1903 Springfields and Mosin–Nagants) up until the early 1980s before it was replaced with more modern small arms (e.g. the Chinese Type 56 assault rifle and the Chinese Type 56 carbine) and became a supplemental ceremonial weapon (the main ceremonial rifle is the SKS) for the People's Liberation Army to the present day. Many of these rifles (along with other PLA and People's Militia small arms) were used by various Red Guard factions during the Cultural Revolution in the mid- to late 1960s.

== Design ==
The main advantage of the Type Chiang Kai-shek over the Arisaka was that it had better stopping power. The rifle also had a better rate of fire and a greater range than the Arisaka. The weapon was shorter, (similar in length to the Karabiner 98k) when compared with the Gewehr 98 and the Arisaka Type 38 but firing produced more blast and recoil.

The rifle can have a HY1935 bayonet attached with the same Mauser bayonet lug.

== Users ==
- ROC: National Revolutionary Army, various Chinese Warlords and pro-Japanese Collaborationist Chinese Army
- China: People's Liberation Army, called the Type 79
- North Vietnam: Viet Minh and Viet Cong

== See also ==
- Mukden Arsenal Mauser
