= Hanyang 88 =

Chinese bolt-action rifle

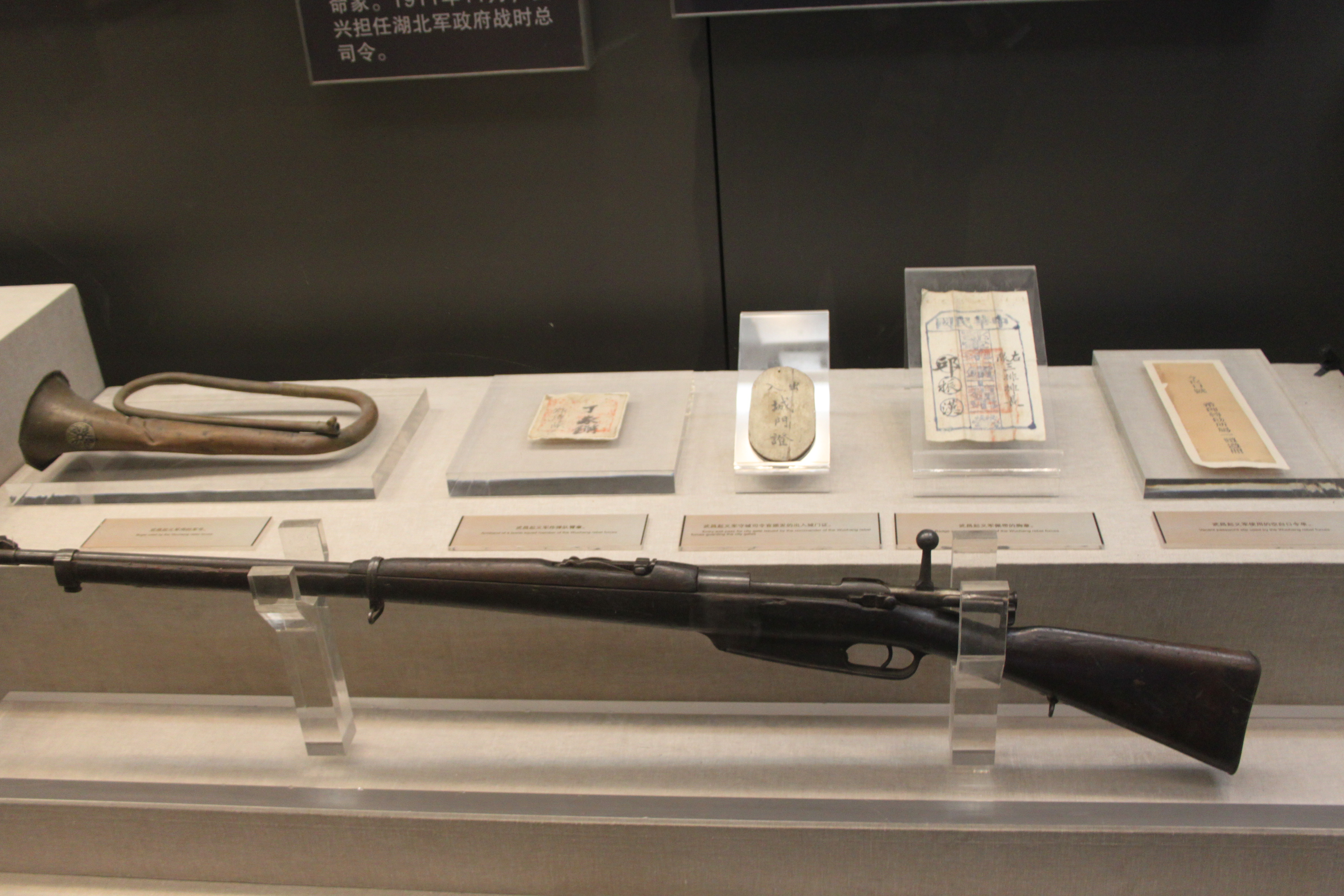
- A Hanyang 88 rifle display in the National Museum of China
- Type: Bolt-action rifle
- Place of origin: Qing dynasty

Service history
- In service: 1895–present
- Used by: See Users
- Wars: Boxer Rebellion; 1911 Revolution; Northern Expedition; Long March; Central Plains War; Chinese Civil War; Second Sino-Japanese War; World War II; First Indochina War; Korean War; Soviet-Afghan War

Production history
- Manufacturer: Hanyang Arsenal
- Produced: 1895–1944
- No. built: 1,083,480
- Variants: Rifle; Carbine

Specifications
- Mass: 4.06 kg (9.0 lb)
- Length: 1,250 mm (49 in)
- Barrel length: 740 mm (29 in)
- Cartridge: M/88
- Action: Bolt-action
- Rate of fire: ~15 rounds per minute
- Muzzle velocity: 620 m/s (2066 fps)
- Effective firing range: 500 m (550 yd)
- Maximum firing range: 2,000 m (2,200 yd)
- Feed system: 5 round en-bloc clip, external box magazine, clip fed
- Sights: rear sight with a range of 160m, front blade sight

The Type 88, sometimes known as Hanyang 88 or Hanyang Type 88 (Chinese: 漢陽八八式步槍) and Hanyang Zao (lit. 'Made in Hanyang'), is a Chinese-made bolt-action rifle, based on the German Gewehr 88. It was adopted by the Qing dynasty towards the end of the 19th century and was used by multiple factions and formations like those in the Republic of China, until the end of the Chinese Civil War.

The name of the rifle is derived from Hanyang Arsenal, the main factory that produced this rifle.

The rifle was due to be replaced as the standard Chinese rifle by the Chiang Kai-shek rifle. However, manufacture of the new rifle never managed to match demand, and the Type 88 continued to be manufactured and to equip the National Revolutionary Army during the Second Sino-Japanese War.

== History ==
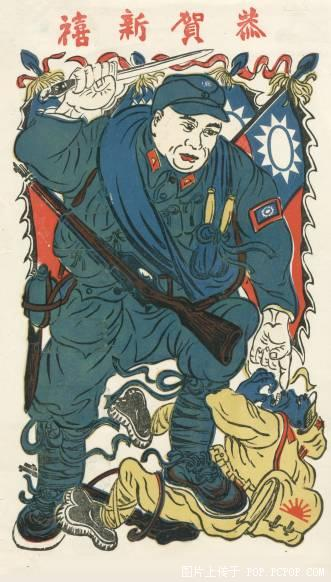
Gewehr 1888 and its copy Hanyang 88 were the main rifles in China for over 50 years

This firearm was a rifle directly patterned on the German Gewehr 88 and was initially fielded by the New Armies of the Qing Dynasty. From the start of production in 1895, the Type 88 was modified twice to improve performance in 1904 and in 1930. It served as one of the standard battle rifles used by the National Revolutionary Army from its founding in 1925 until the late 1940s, after the end of World War II.

Reformed Government troops undergoing training with Hanyang 88 rifles under a Japanese instructor

Japanese forces in China captured large numbers of the Hanyang 88s and issued them to second-line units and collaborationist Chinese troops. It was also used by the Chinese Communists, who not only used it during the same time period, but also during the Korean War. Some were reportedly supplied to the Viet Minh.

Production of the rifle ceased in 1944, 1.1 million rifles having been produced.

Initially manufactured at Hanyang Arsenal, production was moved to the 21st Arsenal in Chongqing after Wuhan fell to Japanese forces in 1938. Further production halted when the Chiang Kai-Shek rifle was instead being produced in 1944.

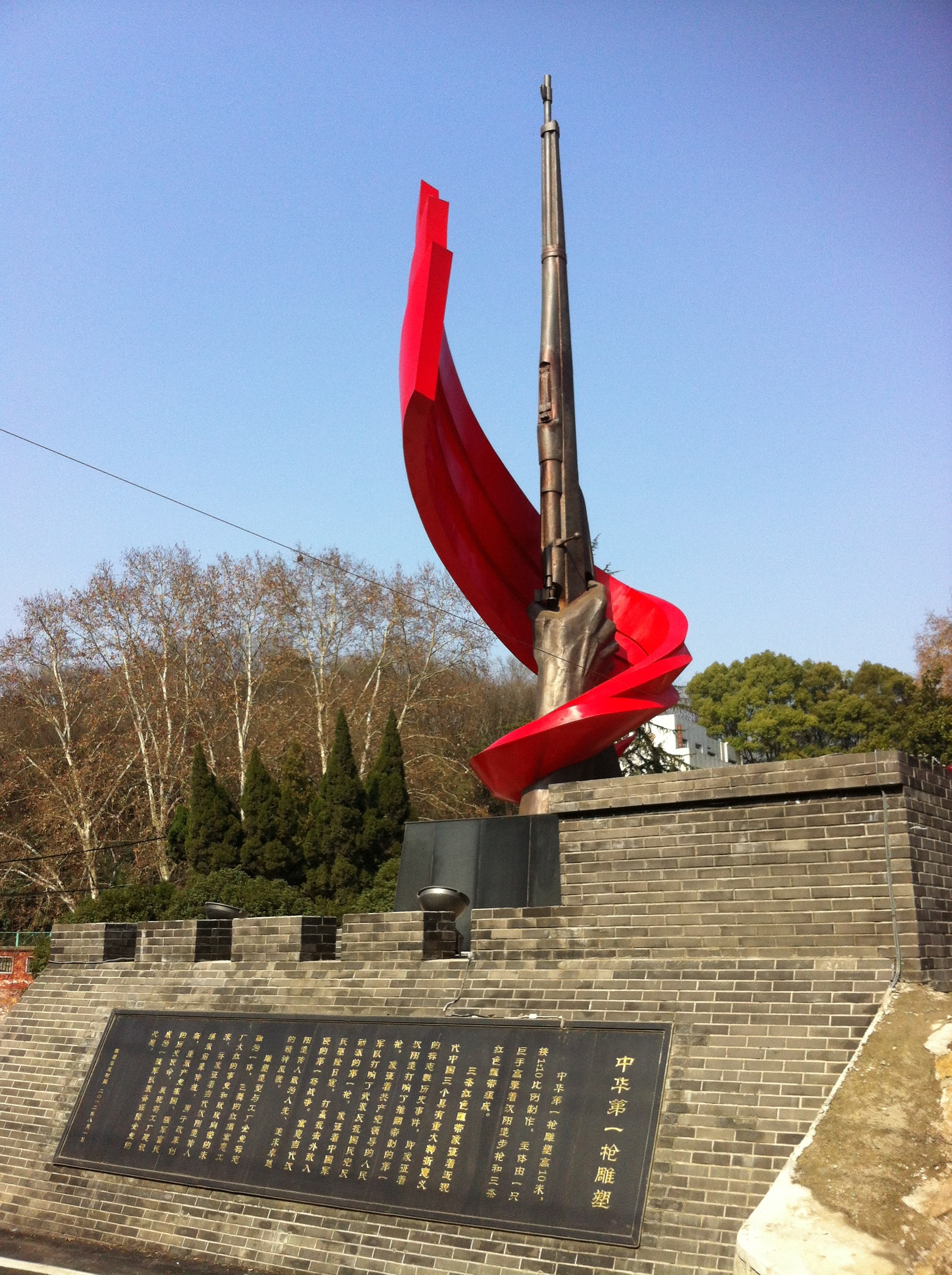
Monument of Hanyang 88

When the rifles were used by the People's Liberation Army, they were either used by militia forces or were used as training/drill rifles.

As part of the Sino-Soviet split, China supplied surplus Hanyang 88s to the Afghan Mujahideen during the Soviet-Afghan War.

== Design ==
The Hanyang 88 was essentially a copy of the Gewehr 88, with a few minor differences taken from the Mannlicher M1904, including the absence of the barrel shroud, and an extension of the bayonet. It was a bolt-action rifle that cocked on opening, and its Mannlicher-style magazine could hold 5 7.92×57mm Mauser rounds. The magazine was loaded by using a 5-round en-bloc clip. When the last round was chambered, the clip would fall out of the magazine via a hole in the bottom. It can also be equipped with a bayonet.

The main advantage of this kind of loading mechanism was that it allowed the user to reload very quickly. The disadvantages, however, were that the hole in the magazine could allow dirt to get in, thus possibly causing reliability issues.

In 1904, the rifle's design was changed to remove the barrel shroud and more wood placed on it to protect the person's hands from being burned. Other changes included the rear sight based on the Kar98.

Although the 5-round en-bloc clips of Hanyang 88 can accept the new round, mass conversion of Hanyang 88 to accept the spitzer bullet, despite having been planned, did not take place.

The Hanyang 88 also had a carbine variant, which was shorter and lighter, albeit with inferior accuracy and range, similarly to the Gewehr 1891 carbine and a short rifle variant.

=== Performance ===
The Hanyang 88 was originally chambered for the German round-nose 7.92×57mm I round. By World War I, this round had already become obsolete. Nevertheless, it was the most numerous rifle used by the Chinese National Revolutionary Army in their engagements with the Japanese during the Second Sino-Japanese War.

== Users ==
- Afghanistan: Used by the Afghan mujahideen during the Soviet-Afghan War supplied by China.
- Qing dynasty: Known to be used in the Boxer Rebellion.
- Republic of China: Used by various Warlords and the NRA.
- People's Republic of China: Used by the PLA before they were phased out.
- Empire of Japan: Some used by second line units.
  - Some Hanyang 88s used by Collaborationist Chinese Army forces.
- Manchukuo: Used by second-line units of the Manchukuo Imperial Army.
- North Vietnam: Some supplied covertly to Viet Minh forces.

== See also ==
- Sino-German cooperation
- Chiang Kai-shek rifle - Another Chinese-made rifle used in World War II.
- Mauser Model 1907 rifle - rifle that failed to replace the Hanyang 88
