= Patrone 88 =

Rifle cartridge

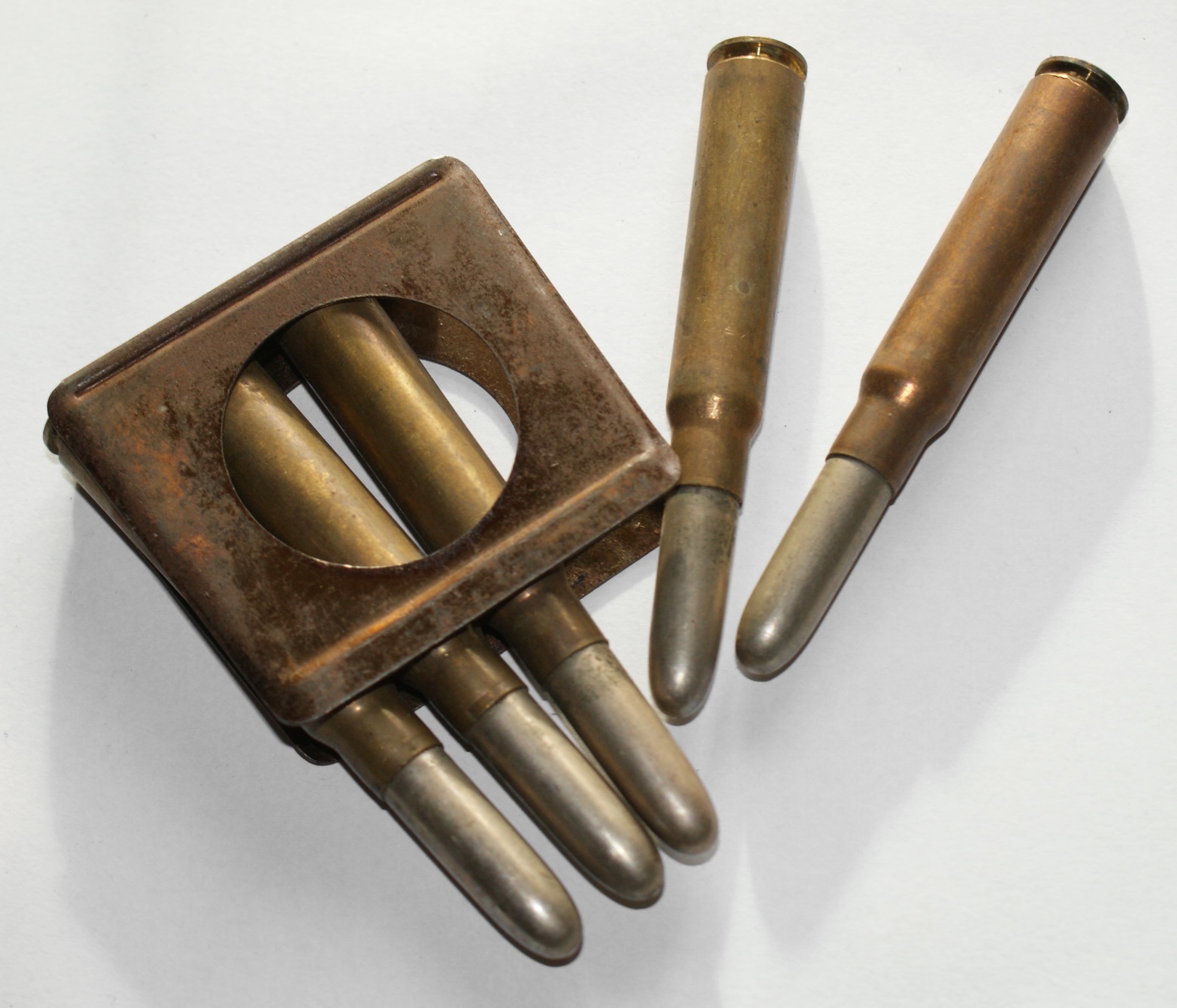
- Five-round clip with 1888 pattern M/88 ammunition
- Type: Rifle
- Place of origin: German Empire

Service history
- In service: 1888–1918
- Used by: German Empire
- Wars: Boxer Rebellion; World War I

Production history
- Designer: German Rifle Testing Commission
- Designed: 1888
- Produced: 1888–present as 8×57mm I
- Variants: 8×57mm I and 8×57mm IR (rimmed)

Specifications
- Case type: Rimless, bottleneck
- Bullet diameter: 8.09 mm (0.319 in)
- Neck diameter: 8.99 mm (0.354 in)
- Shoulder diameter: 10.95 mm (0.431 in)
- Base diameter: 11.94 mm (0.470 in)
- Rim diameter: 11.95 mm (0.470 in)
- Rim thickness: 1.30 mm (0.051 in)
- Case length: 57.00 mm (2.244 in)
- Overall length: 82.00 mm (3.228 in)
- Case capacity: 4.03 cm^{3} (62.2 gr H_{2}O)
- Rifling twist: 240 mm (1 in 9.45 in)
- Primer type: Large rifle
- Maximum pressure (C.I.P.): 380.00 MPa (55,114 psi)
- Filling weight: 2.75 g (42.4 gr)

Ballistic performance
| Bullet mass/type | Velocity | Energy |
|---|---|---|
| 14.6 g (225 gr) FMJ | 620 m/s (2,000 ft/s) | 2,806 J (2,070 ft⋅lbf) |
- Test barrel length: 740 mm (29.1 in)

The Patrone 88 (cartridge 88) or M/88 is a rimless bottlenecked rifle cartridge. It was a first-generation smokeless propellant cartridge designed by the German Gewehr-Prüfungskommission (G.P.K.) (Rifle Testing Commission) as the then-new smokeless propellant introduced as Poudre B in the 1886 pattern 8×50mmR Lebel started a military rifle ammunition revolution.

The Patrone 88 cartridge was loaded with 2.75 g (42.4 gr) of single-base (based on nitrocellulose) smokeless powder. The cartridge was based on a Swiss design and was loaded with a 8.08 mm (0.318 in) diameter 14.6 g (225 gr) round-nose full metal jacket bullet that was cupronickel plated and reached a muzzle velocity of 620 m/s (2,034 ft/s). The bullet core consisted of 95% lead and 5% antimony. It served as parent cartridge of several 8×57mm rimless and rimmed rifle cartridges.

== Origin and military use ==
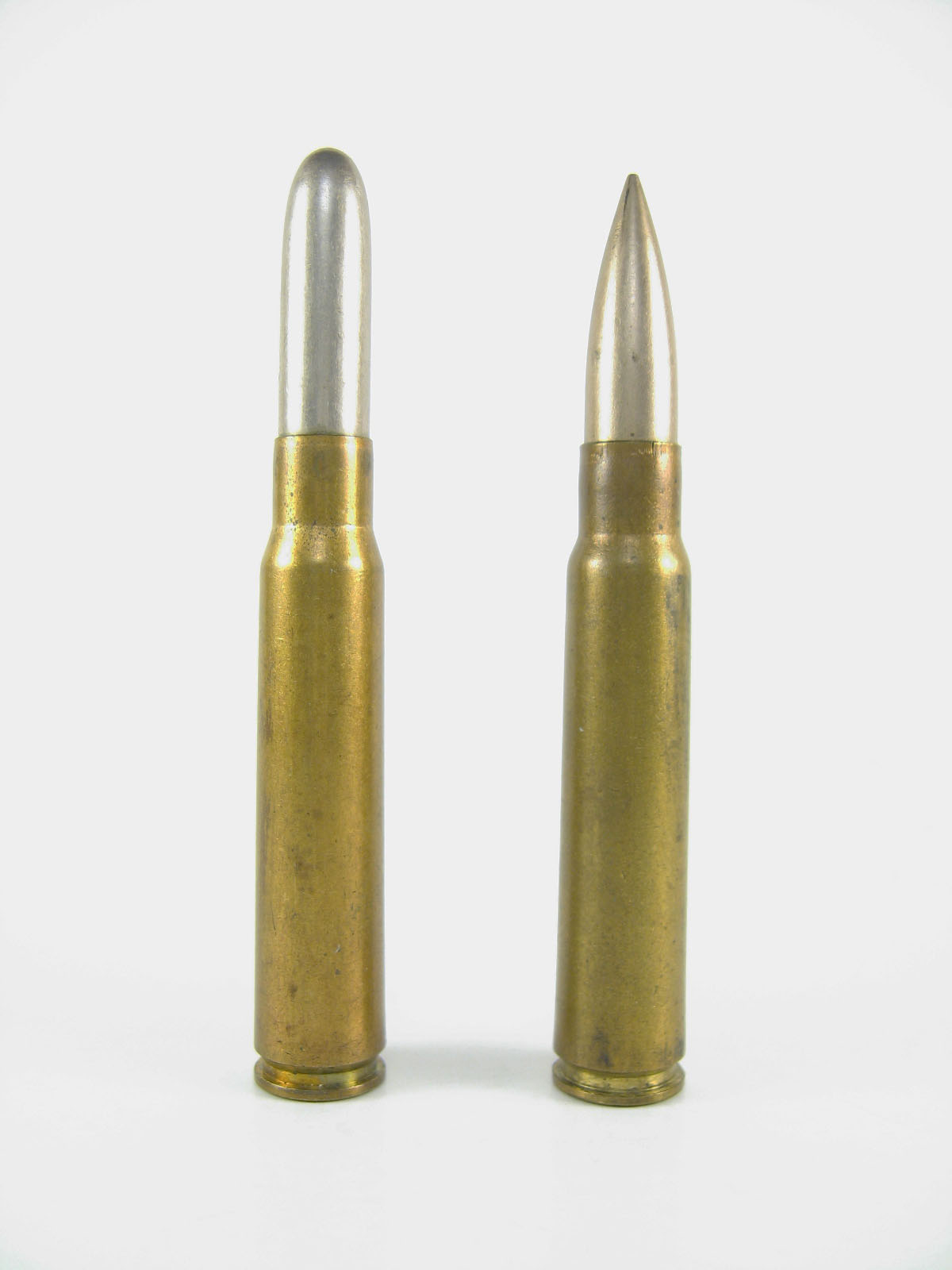
1888 pattern M/88 (left) cartridge alongside the 1903 pattern 7.92×57mm Mauser S Patrone.

The Patrone 88 was adopted by the German Empire in 1888 as service cartridge along with the Gewehr 1888 service rifle. Reportedly the initial version of the design was of two-piece construction like the 11×60mm Mauser and rimmed (so-called M88A, later developed into M88/8R or 8X57 IR hunting cartridge), but then a modern, "cannelured" type of cartridge case was introduced, which, despite being patented at least as early as 1867 (by Joseph Whitworth), wasn't used by any military before.

In the original bore the diameter of the lands was 7.90 mm (0.311 in) and the diameter of the grooves was 8.10 mm (0.319 in). In 1894/1895 the bore dimensions were changed in an attempt to improve accuracy and barrel life. The diameter of the lands remained 7.90 mm (0.311 in) and the diameter of the grooves was changed to 8.20 mm (0.323 in). The 8.08 mm (0.318 in) diameter of the bullets the Patrone 88 was loaded with remained however unchanged and accuracy did not improve. As of 1915 the Patrone 88 bullets became tombac plated.

In German military service the Patrone 88 was replaced in 1904 and 1905 by the S Patrone a.k.a. 7.92×57mm Mauser. Besides the S Patrone chambering, the S Patrone bore (designated as "S-bore") was also dimensionally redesigned: the new bullet with a shorter cylindrical part had reduced bearing surface, which necessitated increasing its diameter to 8.20 mm (0.323 in), the exact diameter of the grooves. The S Patrone and its new spitzer bullet provided the accuracy and barrel life improvements the German military was looking for. As the bolt thrust of the 7.92×57mm Mauser is relatively low compared to many other service rounds used in the early 20th century, many arms originally chambered for the Patrone 88 could be and were adapted for chambering the S Patrone by reaming out metal from the chamber as it required a wider chamber throat to take the differently shaped and thicker brass of the new S Patrone.

== Civilian use and offspring ==
Civilian rifles were also chambered for the Patrone 88. After the adoption of the 7.92×57mm Mauser by the German military, the Patrone 88 was not abandoned by civilian users like hunters. German civilian gunsmiths kept trying to improve the chambering. They took a somewhat similar engineering approach as the German military used, but instead of deepening the grooves and widening the bullet, they reduced the diameter of the lands and grooves whilst leaving the Patrone 88 cartridge itself unchanged. These efforts solved the problems the German military had experienced with the Patrone 88 and resulted and were finalized in what is now known as the 8×57mm I chambering, I (or often, albeit incorrectly, J, which is due to visual similarity of Fraktur I to Roman J) standing for German Infanterie 'infantry'.

In 1939 the Normalisierungsverordnung (normalization regulation) effectively prohibited the production of non-S-bore/7.92×57mm Mauser chambered arms in Nazi Germany. In post World War II Germany the production of the various preceding chamberings is allowed again, but these chamberings have become rare in post 1939 produced arms.

== Civilian 8×57mm I cartridge drawings and dimensions ==
The cartridge has a cartridge case capacity of 4.03 ml (62 grains) H_{2}O.

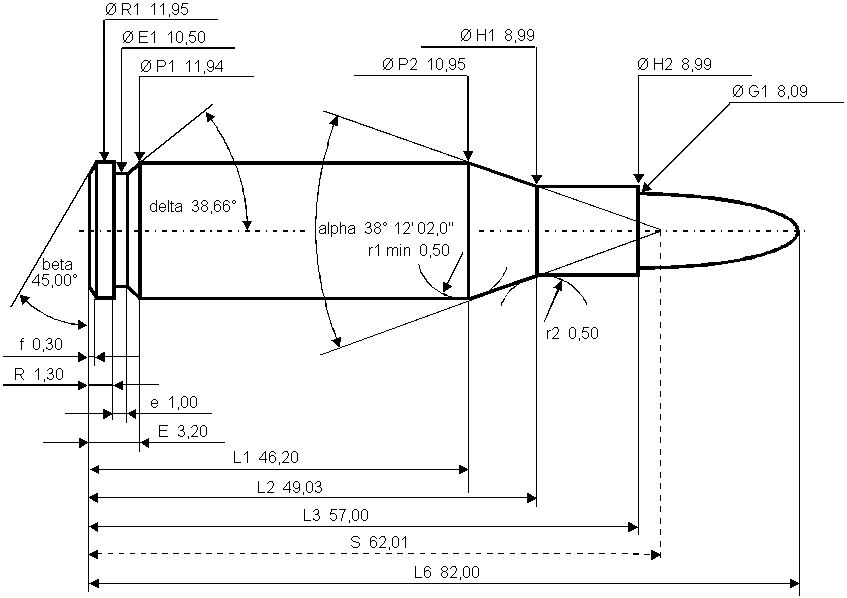

8×57mm I maximum C.I.P. cartridge dimensions. All sizes in millimeters.

Americans would define the shoulder angle at alpha/2 ≈ 19.1 degrees. The common rifling twist rate for this cartridge is 240 mm (1 in 9.45 in), 4 grooves, Ø of the lands = 7.80 mm (0.307 in), Ø grooves = 8.07 mm (0.318 in), land width = 4.40 mm (0.173 in) and the primer type is large rifle.

According to the official C.I.P. (Commission Internationale Permanente pour l'Epreuve des Armes à Feu Portatives) rulings the 8×57mm I can handle up to 380.00 MPa (55,114 psi) P_{max} piezo pressure. In C.I.P. regulated countries every rifle cartridge combo has to be proofed at 125% of this maximum C.I.P. pressure to certify for sale to consumers. This means that 8×57mm I chambered arms in C.I.P. regulated countries are currently (2017) proof tested at 475.00 MPa (68,893 psi) PE piezo pressure.

The rimless 8×57mm I cartridge has been used as parent case for a rimmed 8×57mm IR variant.

== Chambered weapons ==
- Gewehr 1888
- Mannlicher Model 1888 Infantry Rifle
- Mannlicher Model 1893 self-loading rifle
- Puškomitraljez 7,9 mm M.15/26 (Serbian/Yugoslavian Chauchat light machine gun rechambered from 7.65mm Belgian, during a period from 1926 to 1928.)
