= Mauser Standardmodell =

German rifle

Mauser Standardmodell carbine
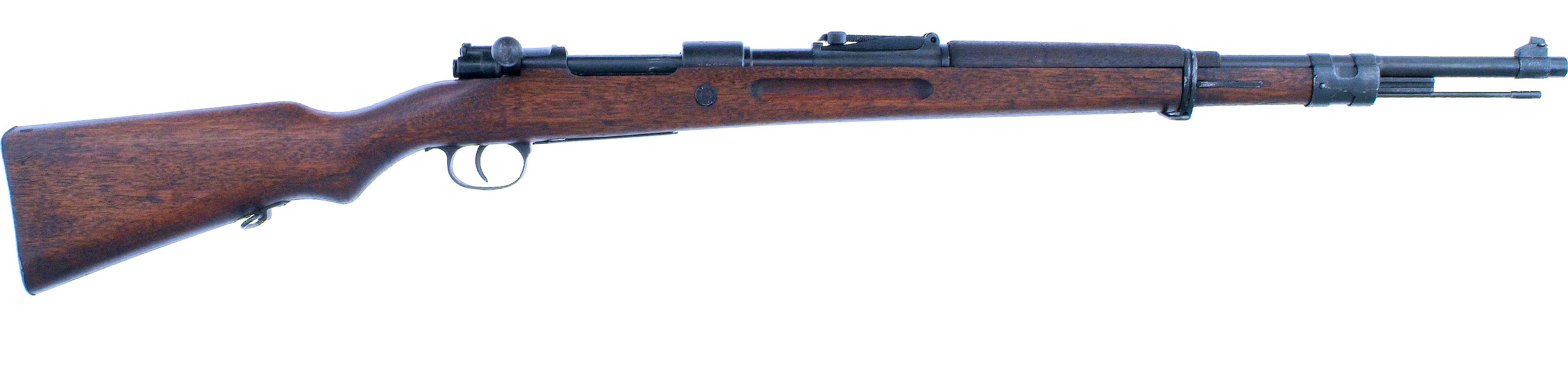
- Type 24 Chiang Kai-shek rifle, a Chinese licensed copy of the Mauser Standardmodell Rifle.
- Type: Bolt-action rifle
- Place of origin: Weimar Republic

Service history
- Used by: See users
- Wars: Chinese Civil War; Chaco War; Second Italo-Ethiopian War; Spanish Civil War; Second Sino-Japanese War; World War II (limited)

Production history
- Designed: 1924
- Manufacturer: Mauser
- Produced: 1924–1935

Specifications
- Mass: 3.99 kg (8.8 lb)
- Length: 1,100 mm (43.31 in)
- Barrel length: 600 mm (23.62 in)
- Cartridge: 7.92×57mm Mauser; 7×57mm Mauser; 7.65×53mm Mauser
- Action: Bolt-action
- Feed system: 5-round stripper clip, internal magazine
- Sights: Tangent-leaf sight

The Standardmodell rifle (also known as Mauser Model 1924 or Mauser Model 1933) is a bolt-action rifle designed to chamber the 7.92×57mm Mauser cartridge. The rifle was developed in 1924 but entered full-scale production in 1933. Officially designed for export and German security guards, it was used by the paramilitary Sturmabteilung (SA) and Schutzstaffel (SS). Export variants were used in South America, Ethiopia, China and the Iberian Peninsula. The carbine version of this rifle was almost identical with the Karabiner 98k that became the standard German service rifle during World War II.

== Design ==
It was a derivative of the Gewehr 98 or Mauser Model 1898, produced in violation of the Treaty of Versailles. It featured combined features of the Karabiner 98AZ and Gewehr 98 versions. The barrel was only 600 mm (23.6 in)-long, comparable to the barrel of the Karabiner 98AZ. The rifle had a new iron sight line, with a tangent rear sight graduated from 100 m (109 yd) to 2,000 m (2,187 yd), with 50 m (55 yd) increments. The rear sight element could be modified to match the trajectory of the standard 7.92×57mm Mauser S Patrone spitzer bullet or the heavier s.S. Patrone boat tail spitzer bullet originally designed for aerial combat and long range machine gun use.

The first version of the gun was designed in 1924. It used the straight bolt handle and the bottom-mounted sling of the Gewehr 98. The rifle entered full-scale production in 1933 with a turned-down bolt and a Karabiner 98k type slot in the butt to attach the sling. The rifle was exported in 7×57mm Mauser, 7.65×53mm Mauser and 7.92×57mm Mauser. A carbine version, identical to the Karabiner 98k, was also produced.

== Service ==
The Standardmodell of 1924 was used by the SA and the SS and was exported to China and South America. According to the manufacturer, the Model 1933 rifle was only sold to the Deutsche Reichspost, the German post office. The rifle was named Gewehr für Deutsches Reichspost (rifle of the German Post Office). Part of this production was actually purchased by Nazi organisations or by the Reichswehr. The Wehrmacht, through requisitions, might have used it during World War II.

Bolivia purchased the Standardmodell in the 1920s and used it in combat during the Chaco War. Its enemy, Paraguay, fielded Standardmodell rifles bought during the 1930s. The rifle was also ordered by Honduras.

The Standardmodell saw service in China. In the Chinese National Armament Standards Conference of 1932 it was decided that the Standardmodell was to be the standard-issue rifle of the National Revolutionary Army. Imports from Germany began in 1934, and production in Chinese arsenals began in 1935. The first 10,000 rifles were bought for the Chinese Tax Police. The rifle was first produced under the name "Type 24 Rifle", but was soon renamed to the "Chiang Kai-Shek rifle" after the Generalissimo. It was used during the Chinese Civil War and the Second Sino-Japanese War.

The Imperial Japanese Navy used the Standardmodell in the form of Chiang Kai-Shek rifles captured in China. The Japanese military procured several rifles from the producer in three contracts (many ended up in IJN, perhaps due to ammo supply difficulties or to unwillingness of the IJ Army arsenals to supply the Navy with domestic rifles): 8,000 in 1938, 20,000 in 1939 and an unclear number in 1940.

The Ethiopian Empire bought 25,000 Model 1924 and Model 1933 rifles and carbines, and fielded them during the Second Italo-Ethiopian War.

The Buenos Aires Police also bought Mauser Model 1933 in rifles and carbines configuration, the latter with a 550 millimetres (21.65 in) barrel. The Argentinean rifles and carbines differ from the other Standardmodells by having an extended arm on the bolt release.

Both before and after the Spanish coup of July 1936, Spain bought Standardmodell rifles and carbines. The German Condor Legion fighting during the Spanish Civil War also used this rifle. Some of the Spanish rifles were rebarreled for the Spanish 7×57mm round. At the same time, Portugal ordered Model 1933s to modernized its military forces.

== Users ==
- Argentina: 7.65mm cartridge
- Bolivia: 7.65mm cartridge
- Republic of China: 7.92mm and 7mm cartridges
- Ethiopian Empire: 7.92mm cartridge
- Weimar Republic: 7.92mm cartridge
- Nazi Germany: 7.92mm cartridge
- Honduras: 7mm cartridge
- Japan: ex-Chinese 7.92mm cartridge
- Paraguay: 7.65mm cartridge
- Portugal:7.92mm cartridge
- Spain: 7.92mm and 7mm cartridges
