= Kropatschek rifle =

Kropatschek/Steyr-Kropatschek
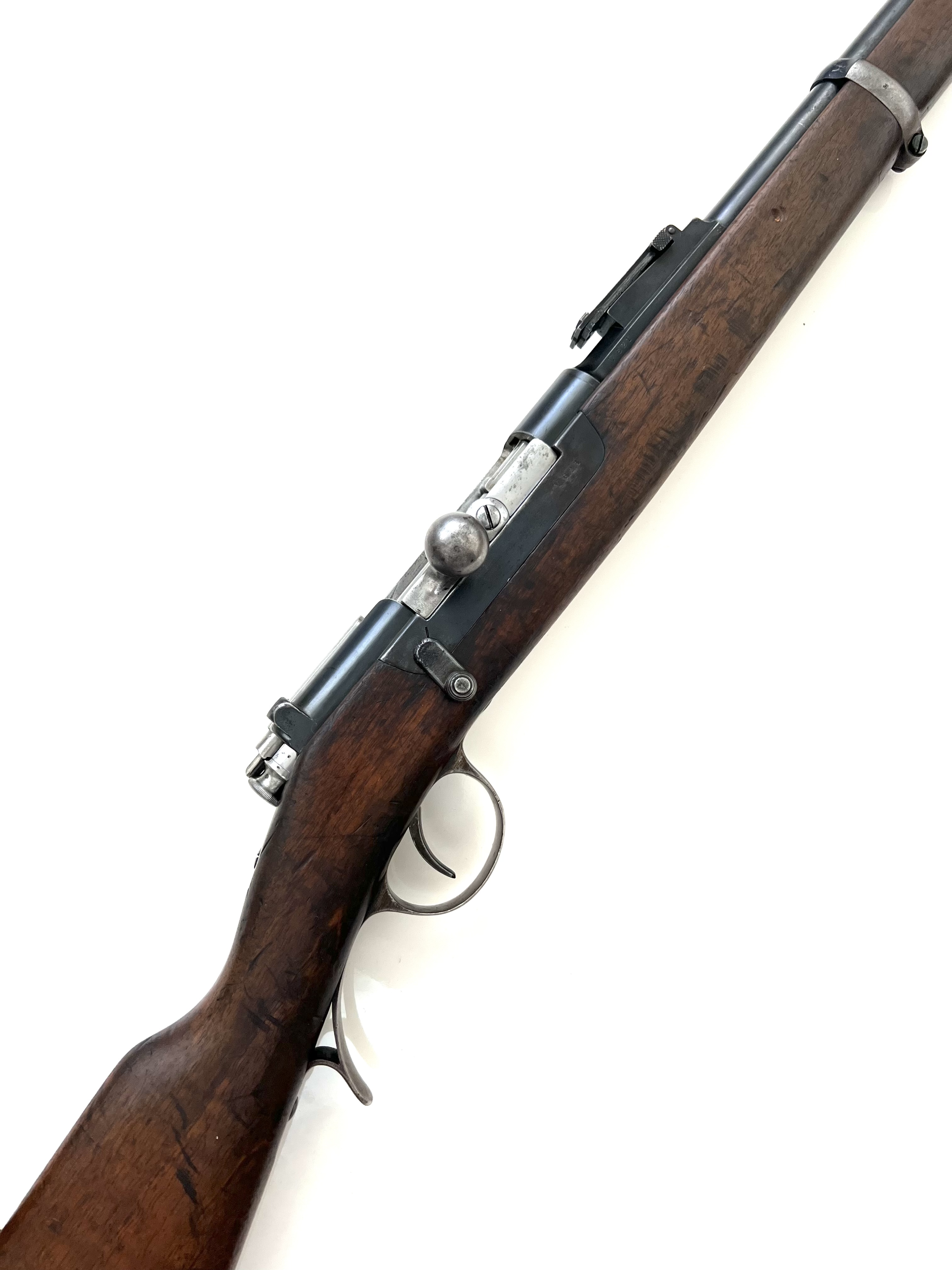
- Kropatschek 1886
- Type: Rifle
- Place of origin: Austria-Hungary

Service history
- In service: 1886–1961 (Portugal)
- Used by: See Users
- Wars: War of the Pacific; French conquest of Tunisia; Mandingo Wars; First Madagascar expedition Tonkin campaign Sino-French War; 31 January 1891 revolt Revolta da Armada; Federalist Revolution; First Italo-Ethiopian War; Portuguese conquest of the Gaza Empire; War of Canudos; Second Boer War; World War I Spanish Civil War; World War II (Portuguese colonies); 1959 Viqueque rebellion Annexation of Goa; Portuguese Colonial War

Production history
- Designer: Alfred von Kropatschek
- Designed: 1886
- Produced: 1886–circa 1898
- Variants: Long rifle, short rifle

Specifications
- Mass: 4.3 kg (9.5 lb)
- Length: 1320 mm (4 ft)
- Barrel length: 820 mm (32.3 in)
- Cartridge: 11.15x58mmR; 11×.15x36mmR; 11×59mmR Gras; 8×56mmR Kropatschek Corto; 8×60mmR Guedes; 8x50mmR Mannlicher
- Caliber: 8mm (.329 in)
- Action: Bolt action
- Muzzle velocity: 609 m/s (2,000 ft/s)
- Effective firing range: 2406 yd (2,200 m)
- Feed system: 8-round integral tubular magazine

A Kropatschek is any variant of a rifle designed by Alfred von Kropatschek. Kropatschek's rifles used a tubular magazine (constructed of nickel-plated steel) of his design, of the same type used in the Japanese Murata Type 22 and the German Mauser Gewehr 1871/84. While designed for black powder, the Kropatschek action proved to be strong enough to handle smokeless powder.

The French Lebel Model 1886 rifle was a modified Kropatschek, which was adopted by the French Navy in 1878.

== Variants ==
=== Austria-Hungary ===
- Gendarmerie Repetier-Karabiner M1881: 11 mm Gendarmerie Carbine (also known as M1874/81);
- Kropatschek Torpedo Boats Gewehr M1893: 8 mm Navy Rifle for Torpedo boat crews.

=== France ===
- Fusil de Marine Mle 1878: 11 mm Navy Rifle, it was a modified Fusil Gras mle 1874 fitted with a 7-round tubular magazine and shortened 60 mm (2.4 in) to reduce weight.
- Fusil d'Infanterie Mle 1883: 11 mm Infantry Rifle.
- Fusil d'Infanterie Mle 1874/85: 11 mm Infantry Rifle—like the Navy M1878, it was a Gras M1874 rifle fitted with a Kropatschek magazine and a two-piece stock, and the gun overall length was shortened 60 mm (2.4 in).

=== Portugal ===
- Espingarda de Infantaria 8 mm m/1886: 8 mm Infantry Rifle;
- Carabina de Caçadores 8 mm m/1886: 8 mm Light Infantry Carbine;
- Carabina de Cavalaria 8 mm m/1886: 8 mm Cavalry Carbine;
- Carabina da Guarda Fiscal 8 mm m/1886/88: 8 mm Treasury Guard Carbine;
- Espingarda de Infantaria 8 mm m/1886/89: 8 mm Colonial Infantry Rifle;
- Carabina de Artilharia 8 mm m/1886/91: 8 mm Artillery Carbine.

== Users ==
- Austria-Hungary
- Brazil – 1878 Kropatschek rifle adopted by the navy in 1884; in 1891 it was replaced by the 1886 Portuguese model. During the second Revolta da Armada the army used a small number of Kropatscheks captured from navy depots. The Kropatschek was phased out in naval service in 1895 after the adoption of the 1894 Brazilian Mauser
- Chile – 2,000 1878 Kropatschek rifles were delivered for the navy in 1881. The objective of this acquisition was to have a fast-firing weapon to repeal torpedo boats.
- Ethiopian Empire
- French Third Republic
- Kingdom of Greece – Part of French military aid during World War I.
- Kingdom of Portugal
- Portugal – Remained in service with colonial troops until 1961
- Qing Empire
- Russian Empire – 150,000 Kropatscheks bought from France in 1915
- Soviet Union – taken into Soviet inventory following the Russian Civil War; most were shipped to Republican forces during the Spanish Civil War
- Kingdom of Spain – 746 M1878 Kropatschek rifles procured from OEWG.
- Spanish Republic – 1,821 surplus 1878 Kropatschek rifles delivered by the Soviet Union
- Wassoulou Empire – The Wassoulou Empire arms industry created functional copies of the Krophatschek rifle in the 1880s and 90s to use in their struggle against French colonial forces.

== See also ==
- Antique firearms
