= Mauser-Koka =

Serbian rifle

Serbian Model 1878/80 (Mauser-Koka)
- Type: Service rifle
- Place of origin: Kingdom of Serbia

Service history
- In service: 1881–1940s
- Used by: Kingdom of Serbia
- Wars: Serbo-Bulgarian War; Balkan Wars; World War I (limited); World War II (limited)

Production history
- Designer: Kosta "Koka" Milovanović (Коста "Кока" Миловановић)
- Designed: 1880
- Manufacturer: Mauser; Zastava Arms
- Developed from: Mauser Model 1871
- Variants: See § Variants

Specifications
- Mass: 4.5 kg (9.92 lb)
- Length: 1,350 mm (53.15 in)
- Barrel length: 855 mm (33.66 in)
- Cartridge: Mauser-Koka M.78/80: 10.15×63mmR; Mauser-Koka 1884 Carbine: 10.15×63mmR; Mauser-Koka 1884 Carbine (Late 1930s conversion): 11×59mmR Gras; Koka-Đurić M.80/07C: 7×57mm Mauser
- Action: Bolt action
- Muzzle velocity: 1,680 ft/s (510 m/s)
- Feed system: Mauser-Koka M.78/80: Single-shot; Mauser-Koka 1884 Carbines: 5-round Tube magazine; Koka-Đurić M.80/07C: 5-round Box magazine
- Sights: Iron sights

The Mauser-Koka was a Serbian service rifle created in the late 19th century.

== History ==
In 1880, Serbian Major Kosta "Koka" Milovanović (Коста "Кока" Миловановић) developed an updated version of the Mauser Model 1871, still single-shot, but chambered in its unique 10.15×63mmR cartridge. It had unique additions in that it had a bolt guide (much like the M1870 Italian Vetterli) and the "progressive rifling" that was developed by Koka. The Kingdom of Serbia adopted the rifle in 1880. It was designated Serbian Model 1878/80, also known as Mauser-Koka, Mauser-Milovanović, and known in Serbian as Kokinka (Кокинка). The grooves reduced in diameter from breech to muzzle. The muzzle velocity of the Mauser-Milanović was 1,680 feet per second (510 m/s). It saw first combat in the Serbo-Bulgarian War. Approximately 110,000 Mauser-Milovanović rifles entered the Serbian arsenal. It was further developed in 1907.

== Variants ==
=== Mauser-Koka 1884 ===
The Mauser Models 1884 "Artillery & Cavalry Carbine" were produced in 1884 in 4,000 units each at the Oberndorf plant for the use of the Serbian cavalry and Artillery. They were based on the M71/84 and had a five-round tubular magazine. By 1914, only 126 Cavalry & 815 Artillery models were left in the military's possession. In 1937, all remaining Model 1884 carbines were converted to the 1870s vintage 11×59mmR Gras cartridge, which was in good supply in Yugoslav Army depots after the Balkan War.

=== Mauser-Koka-Đurić ===
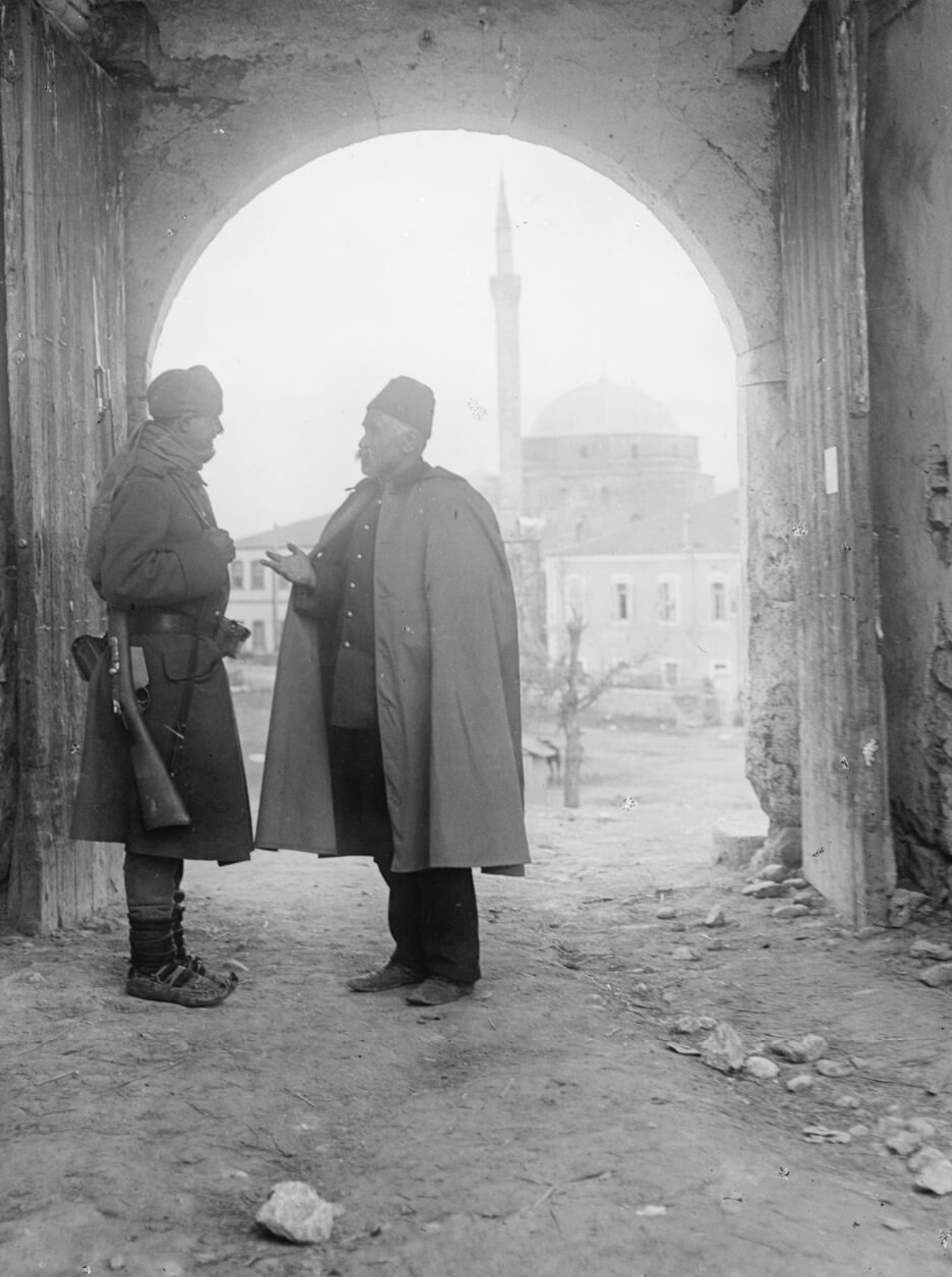
Serbian armed with Đurić M80/07C Mauser and Turkish soldier conversing in Skopje, 1912

Starting 1907, about half of the Mauser-Koka inventory was converted in Kragujevac to shoot the 7×57mm from a 5-shot magazine; the new barrels were purchased from Steyr. An additional locking lug was added by milling the receiver on a lathe around 1mm, then heating the locking lug collar red-hot and fitting to the cold receiver. Both the old and new guns (designated M.80/07 or M.80/07 C) saw action in the Balkan Wars and World War I. The converted M80/07 are often referred to as "Đurić Mausers" (Ђурић-Маузер). The M.80/07 C rifles captured from the Royal Yugoslav Army by the Nazi Germany during the World War II were designated Gewehr 223 (j), while surplus M.78/80 rifles that was still in storage were designated Gewehr 352 (j).

== See also ==
- Serbian Model 1899
- Serbian Model 1908
- Serbian Model 1910
- Yugoslavian Model 90
- Yugoslavian Model 03
- Yugoslavian Model 24
- Yugoslavian Model 24CK
- Yugoslavian Model 24 Carbine

== Sources ==
- Ball, Robert W.D. (2 August 2011). Mauser Military Rifles of the World. Gun Digest Books. pp. 311–314. ISBN 978-1-4402-1544-5.
- John Sheehan, 1 of 110,000. The Serbian M78/80 is one of the Rarest of Mauser Rifles", Guns magazine, May 2012, pp. 36-39
- Viktor Kovačević (August 1998). "KOKA POPRAVLJA MAUZERA". Srpsko nasleđe, Istorijske sveske, broj 8 (in Serbian). NIP „GLAS“. Archived from the original on 22 August 2021.
