= Mauser M71/84 =

Mauser Model 71/84
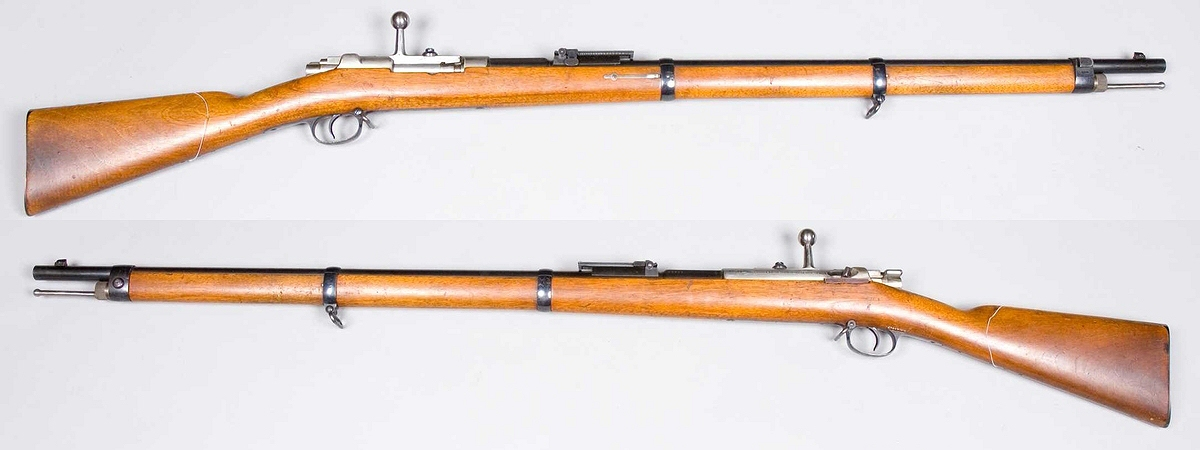
- Mauser Model 71/84
- Type: Bolt action rifle
- Place of origin: German Empire

Service history
- In service: 1884–1888 (as the standard German service rifle); 1884–1945 (limited and foreign use)
- Wars: Argentine Civil Wars; Serbo-Bulgarian War; Second Franco-Dahomean War; First Italo-Ethiopian War; Greco-Turkish War (1897); Uruguayan Revolution of 1897; Second Boer War; Boxer Rebellion; Balkan Wars; World War I; German Revolution of 1918–19; World War II (limited)

Production history
- Designer: Mauser
- Designed: 1881–1883
- Manufacturer: Mauser; Steyr
- Produced: 1884–1890
- No. built: 1,000,000+
- Variants: M1878/80 Carbines (Serbia); M1887 (Turkey)

Specifications
- Mass: 4.5 kg (9.92 lbs)
- Length: 1,350 mm (53 in)
- Barrel length: 855 mm (33.7 in)
- Cartridge: 11.15×60R; 10.15×63R (Serbia); 11x59R Gras (Serbia); 9.5×60R (Turkey); 7.65×53 (Turkish Trials)
- Caliber: .43
- Action: Bolt action
- Muzzle velocity: 1,430 ft/s (440 m/s) (11×60mmR)
- Maximum firing range: 1,600 m (1,749.8 yd) (maximum setting on sights)
- Feed system: 8-round tube magazine
- Sights: Iron sights graduated from 200 to 1,600 meters

The Mauser Model 71/84, adopted as the Gewehr 71/84 or Infanterie-Gewehr 71/84, or "Infantry Rifle 71/84" ("I.G.Mod.71/84" was stamped on the rifles themselves), was the second rifle model in a distinguished line designed and manufactured by Paul Mauser and Wilhelm Mauser of the Mauser company and later mass-produced at Spandau arsenal.

== History ==
After troop trials in 1882 and 1883, the design was updated in 1884 with an 8-round tubular magazine designed by Alfred von Kropatschek, making this the German Army's first repeating rifle (a prototype of an M1871 with a tubular magazine was displayed to Wilhelm II as early as September 1881). This version was designated the Gewehr 1871/84, of which over a million examples were produced.

== Variants ==
=== Jäger ===
The same configuration as the standard infantry rifle, with the addition of a sling swivel at the butt.

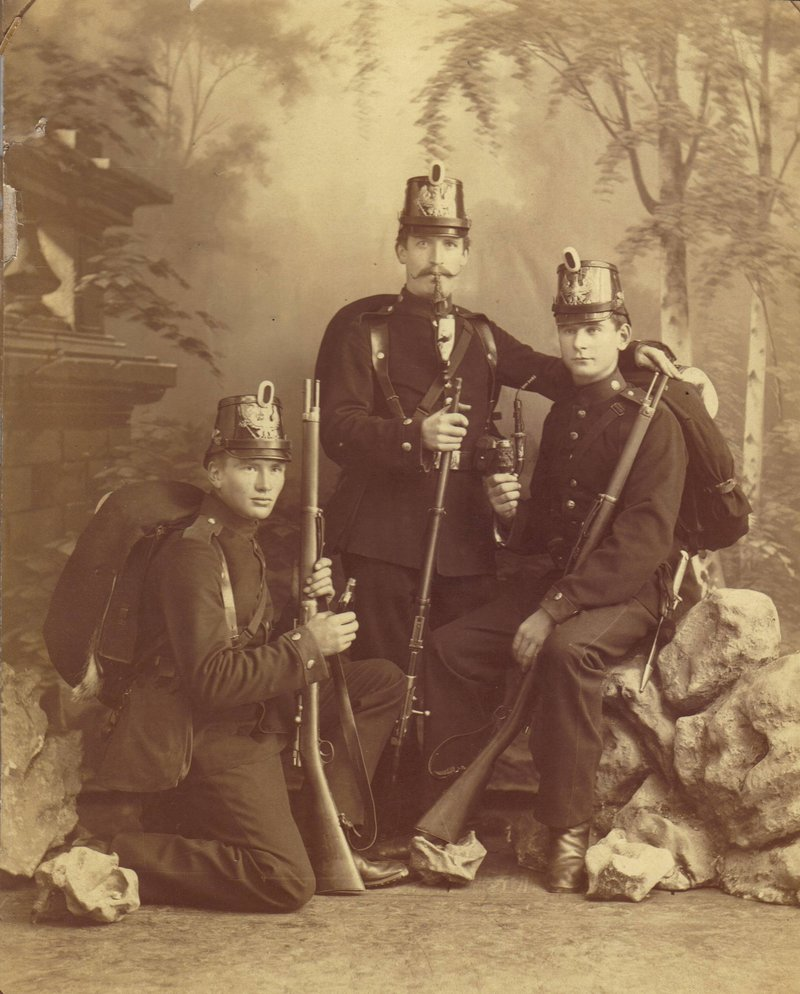
M71/84 Jäger rifles

=== M1887 ===
Adopted by the Ottoman Empire, it differed from the M71/84 in that it had a side-mounted cleaning rod, only two barrel bands, a second locking lug on the rear of the bolt and that it was in 9.5×60mmR, which Paul Mauser touted as the most efficient (black powder) cartridge. A total of 270,000 rifles and 4000 carbines were delivered before adopting the M1890. In 1911, the Ottomans looked into having their rifles converted to 7.65×53mm smokeless by the Mauser factory and Steyr, though they ultimately turned down the proposal, a few were made.

=== Artillery & Cavalry Carbine ===
In 1884, Serbia purchased 4,000 units each at the Oberndorf plant for the use of the Serbian cavalry and Artillery in their proprietary 10.15x63mmR cartridge. In 1937, all remaining Model 1884 carbines were converted to the 1870s vintage 11×59mmR Gras cartridge, which was in good supply in Yugoslav Army depots after the Balkan War.

== Users ==
- Ecuador
- Canada: Quebec Home Guard use (rifles marked Q.H.G.)
- Germany
- Nazi Germany
- Ottoman Empire: M1887
- Serbia: Carbines
- Thailand
- Venezuela

== Gallery ==
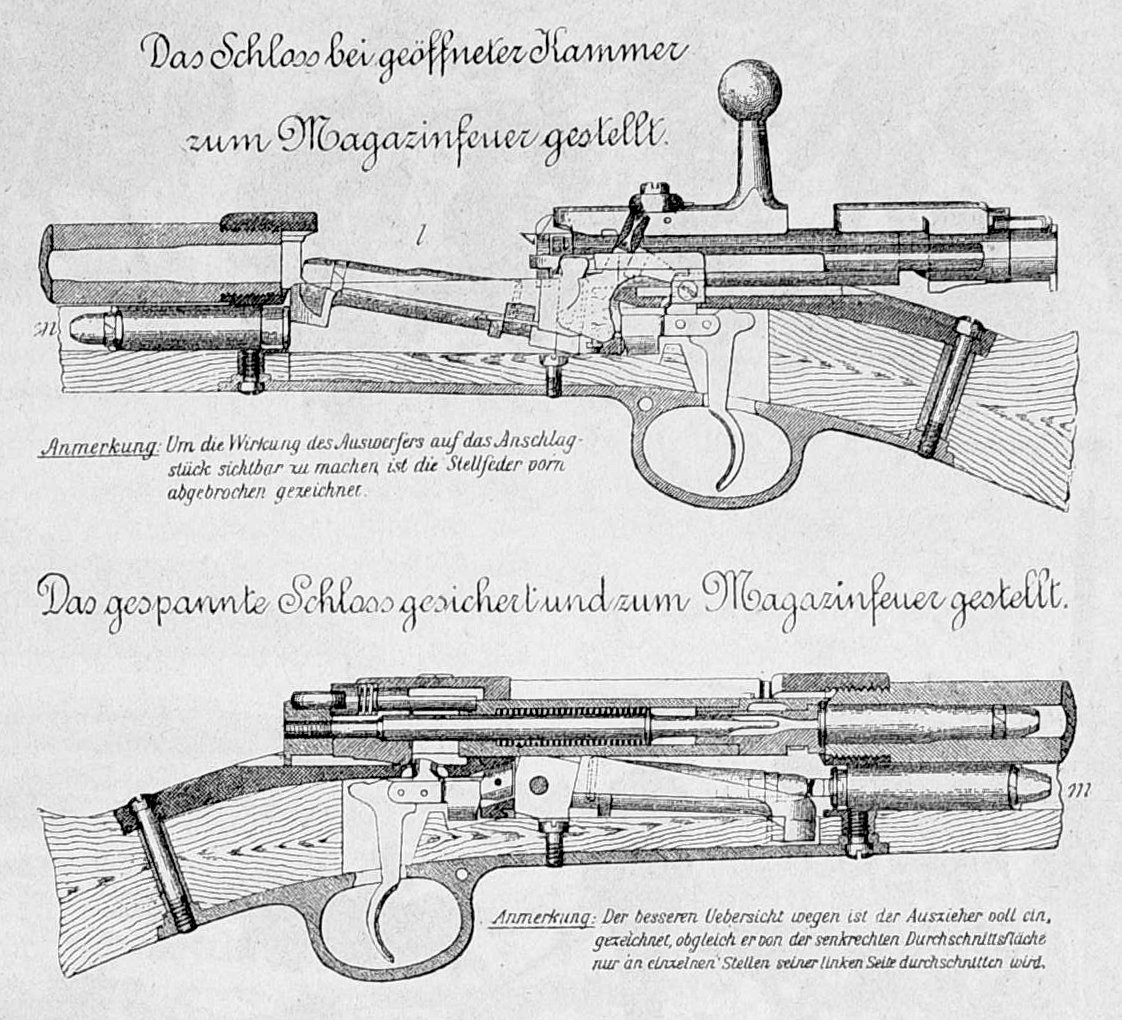
Action and Magazine Cutaway

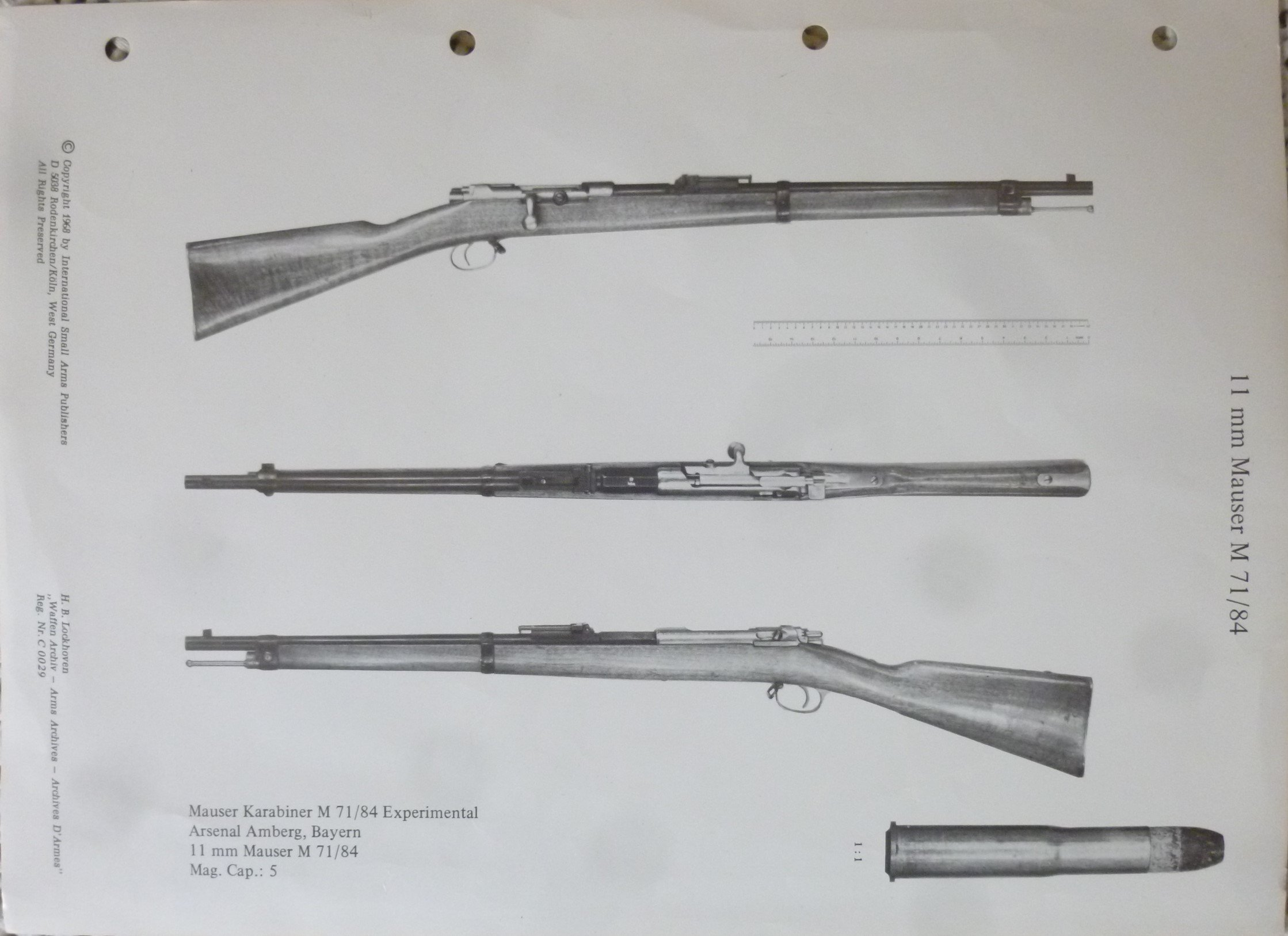
Experimental Carbine

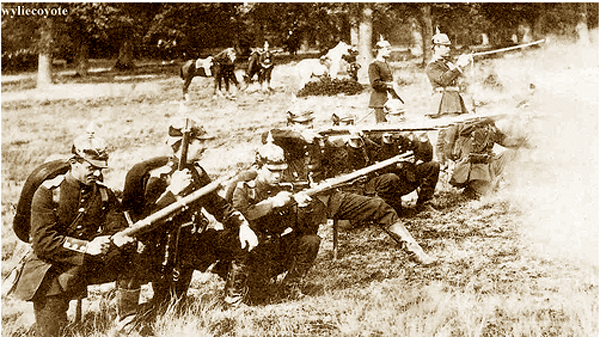
German Soldiers test fire M71/84

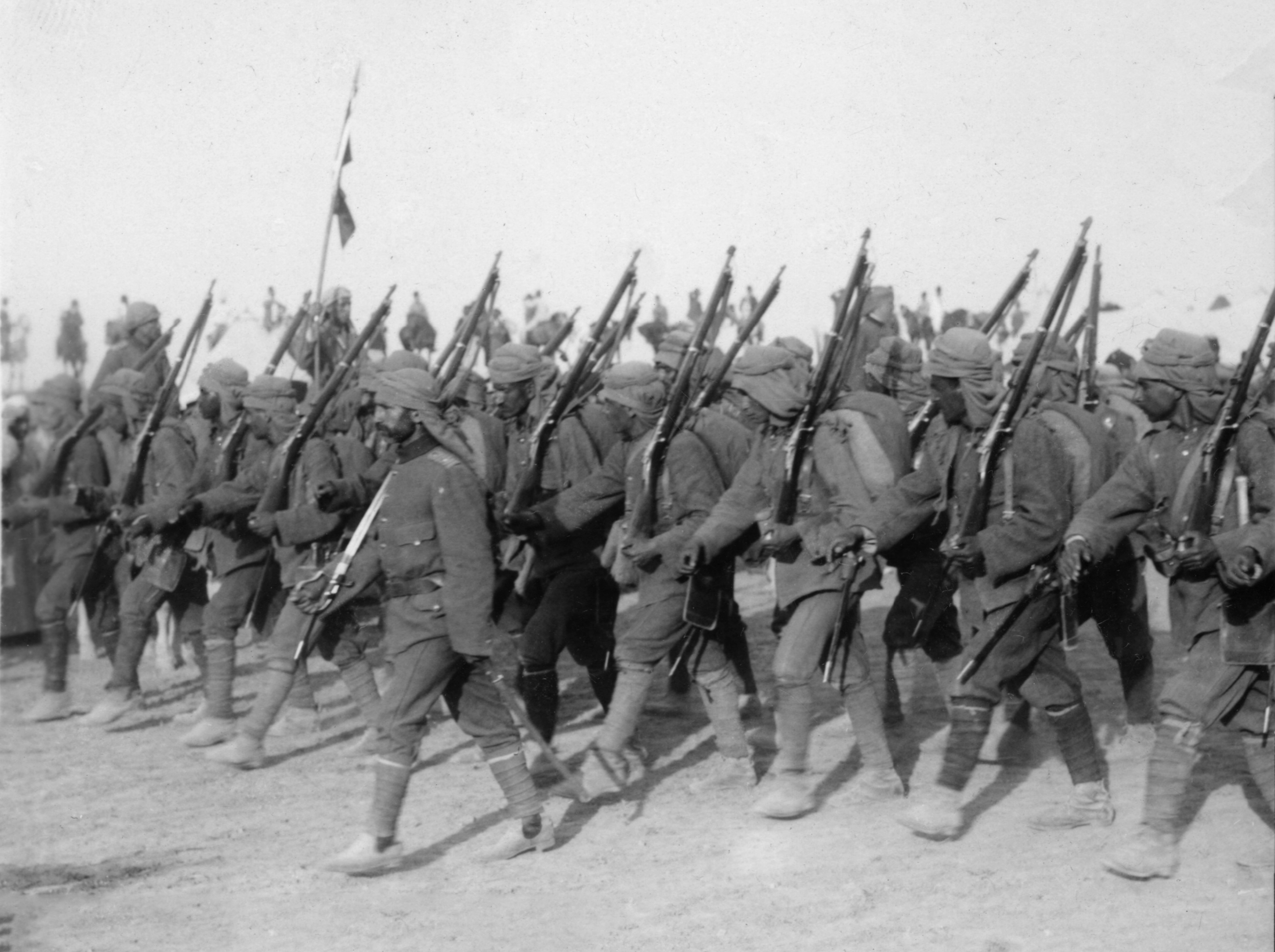
Ottoman M1887 Rifles in WW1

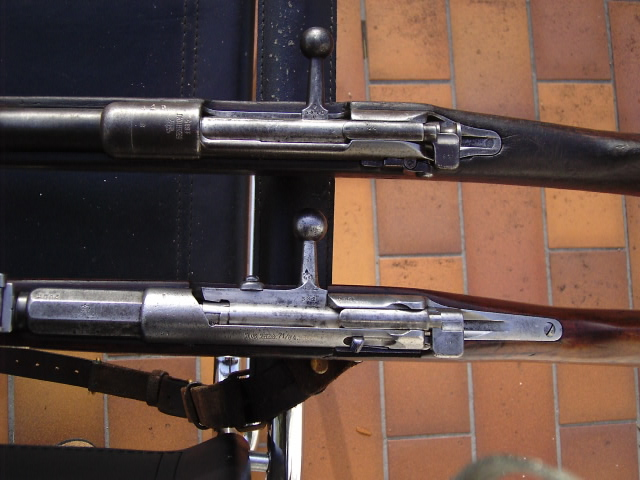
Top view of Gewehr 1888 and M71/84

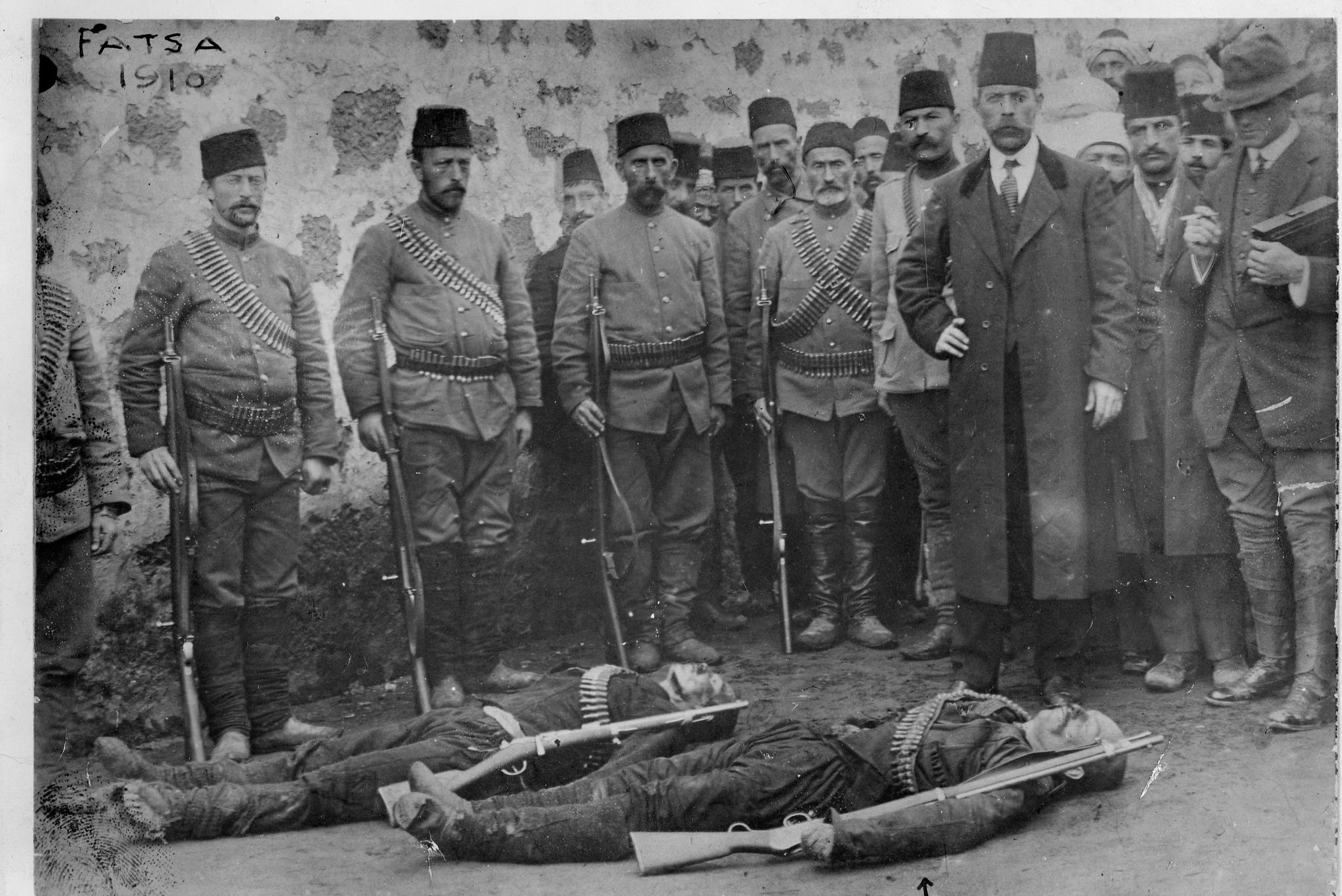
Ottoman Police armed with M1887 rifles in the after math of the shootout with Hekimoglu

== Bibliography ==
- Ball, Robert W.D. (2 August 2011). Mauser Military Rifles of the World. Gun Digest Books. ISBN 978-1-4402-1544-5.
- Grant, Neil (20 Mar 2015). Mauser Military Rifles. Weapon 39. Osprey Publishing. ISBN 9781472805942.
