= 11×60mm Mauser =

Rifle cartridge

11×60 mm Mauser
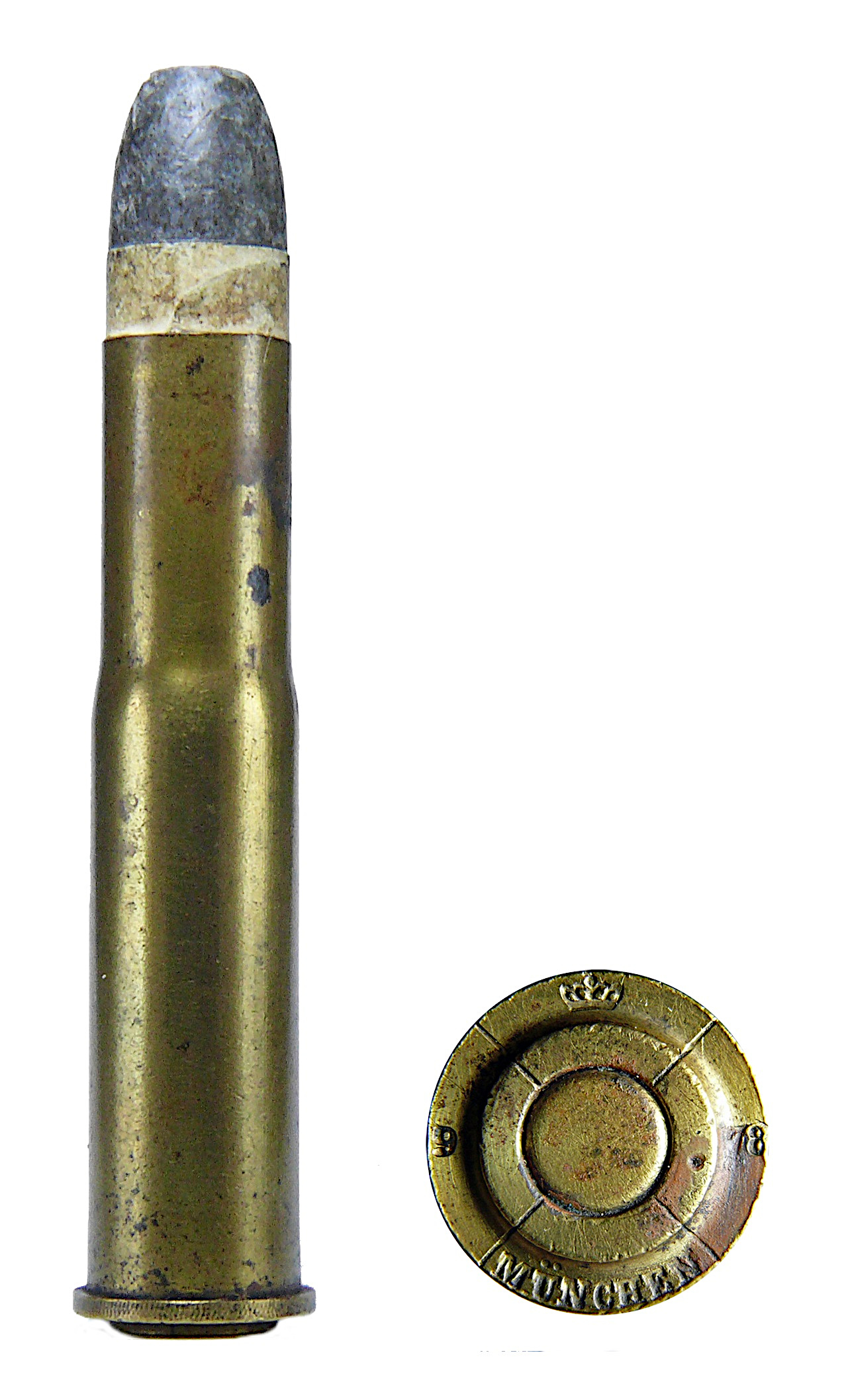
- Type: Rifle
- Place of origin: German Empire

Service history
- Used by: Germany, Japan, Qing dynasty, Uruguay, Korean Empire
- Wars: Satsuma Rebellion, First Sino-Japanese War, Boxer Rebellion

Production history
- Designer: Paul Mauser

Specifications
- Case type: Rimmed Bottleneck
- Bullet diameter: .446 in (11.3 mm)
- Neck diameter: .465 in (11.8 mm)
- Shoulder diameter: .510 in (13.0 mm)
- Base diameter: .516 in (13.1 mm)
- Rim diameter: .586 in (14.9 mm)
- Rim thickness: 0.091 in (2.3 mm)
- Case length: 2.37 in (60 mm)
- Overall length: 2.800 in (71.1 mm)
- Case capacity: 93.61gr H20
- Primer type: Large Rifle

Ballistic performance
Bullet mass/type	Velocity	Energy
370 gr (24 g) lead	1,430 fps (435 m/s)	1,680 ft⋅lb (2,278 J)

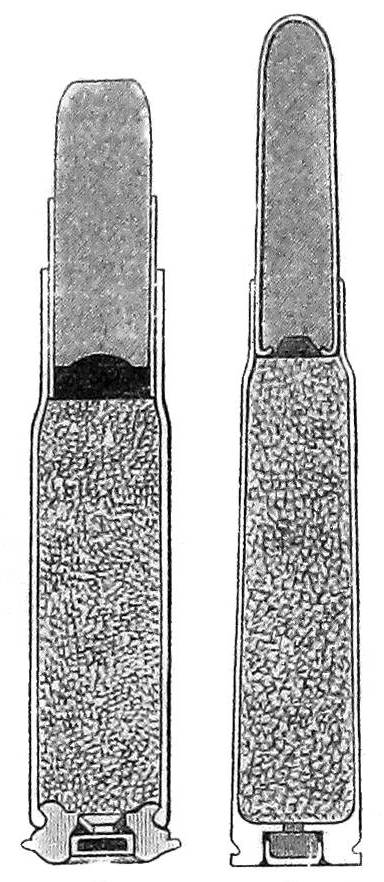
A two-piece 11mm cartridge (left) compared to a more modern 7.65×53mm Mauser

The 11mm Mauser (also known as the 11×60mmR Mauser or .43 Mauser) is a black-powder cartridge developed between 1867 and 1871 and used in the Mauser Model 1871 rifle, as well as the 71/84 variant. It was popular in German sporting rifles up until the early 20th century. It is no longer in production, however it is available from custom loaders and handloading can be done. As early as 1867, the first considerations arose in Prussia to replace the needle rifle with a breech-loading weapon with centerfire cartridges.

On November 7, 1871, the Prussian Rifle Commission set the caliber of the new rifle at 11 mm. The cartridge is based on the Werder rifle cartridge, caliber 11 × 50 mm R.

In 1904, a German gunsmith from Suhl, August Schüler, developed a rimless version of the cartridge to be used in Gewehr 88 & Gewehr 98 actions.

== See also ==
- Table of handgun and rifle cartridges
