= Mylonas rifle =

Mylonas M1874 rifle
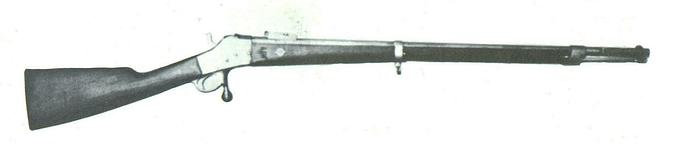
- Type: Rifle
- Place of origin: Greece

Service history
- Used by: Hellenic Army

Production history
- Designer: Efstathios Mylonas
- Designed: 1874
- Manufacturer: Emile et Leon Nagant
- No. built: 8,500

Specifications
- Cartridge: 11×59mmR Gras
- Action: Falling-block
- Sights: Iron

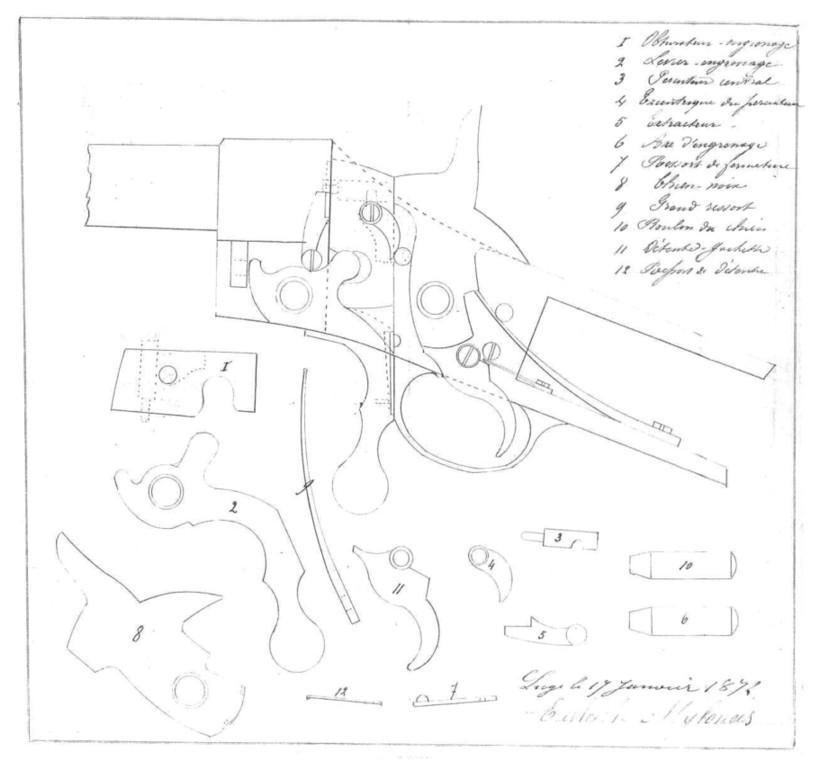
1874 patent for the Mylonas design

The Mylonas Rifle, usually referred to as the Greek Mylonas M1874, is a Greek-designed falling-block black powder rifle. It was designed and developed in 1874 by Greek Artillery Major Efstathios Mylonas (Ευστάθιος Μυλωνάς) while working in the Athens technical facility of the Greek Military Material Authority ("Eforeia Ylikou Polemou", EYP). The 11-mm caliber rifle was a modification of the M1870 Belgian Comblain but with a larger protruding hammer and uniquely styled actuating lever. It was adopted by the Greek Army and, as there was no facility in the country able to produce quantities with the required rate, its construction was ordered to Emile et Leon Nagant of Liège, Belgium. Thus, only the prototype was built in Greece. The Mylonas was shortly replaced by the M1874 French Gras rifle considered superior by the Greek Army. The Mylonas rifle was used during the Thessaly campaign of 1878 and as a reserve in later conflicts, while some equipped police units. Due to its early replacement, a total of only approximately 8500 were built. Today Mylonas rifles are considered collectible items.

== Gallery ==
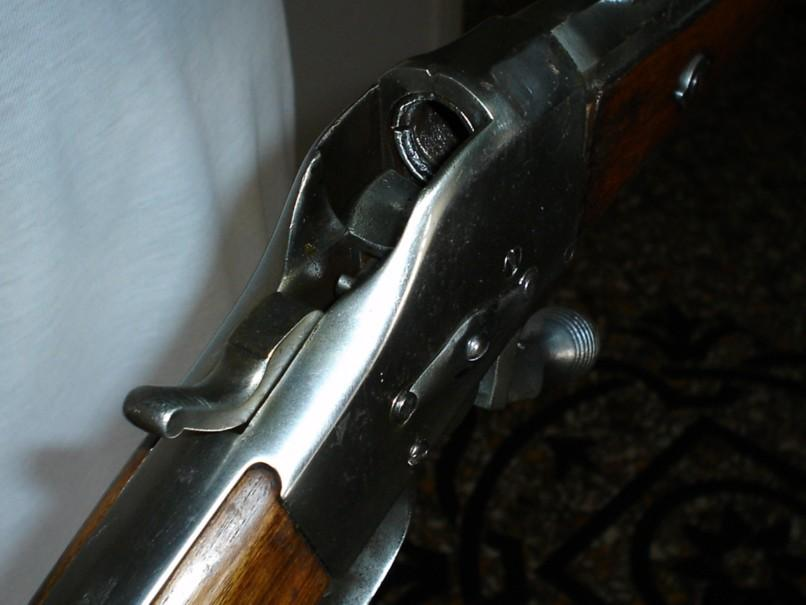

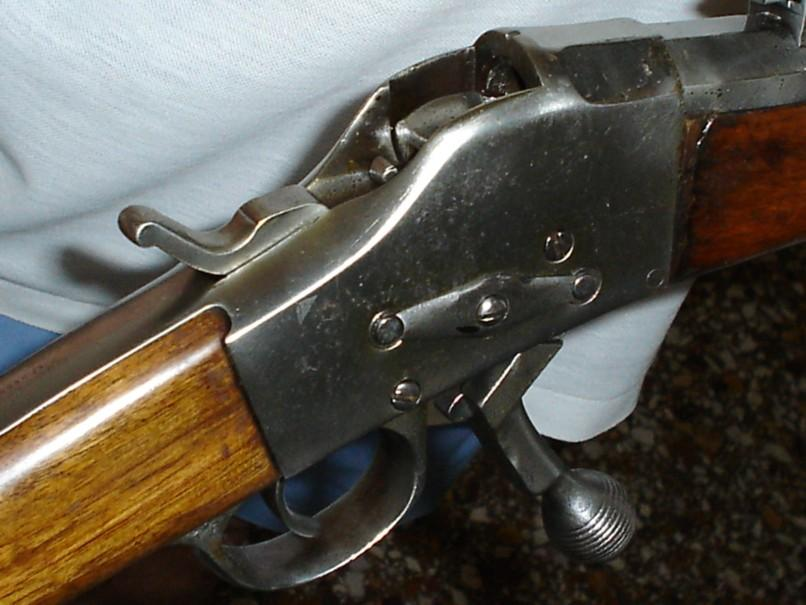

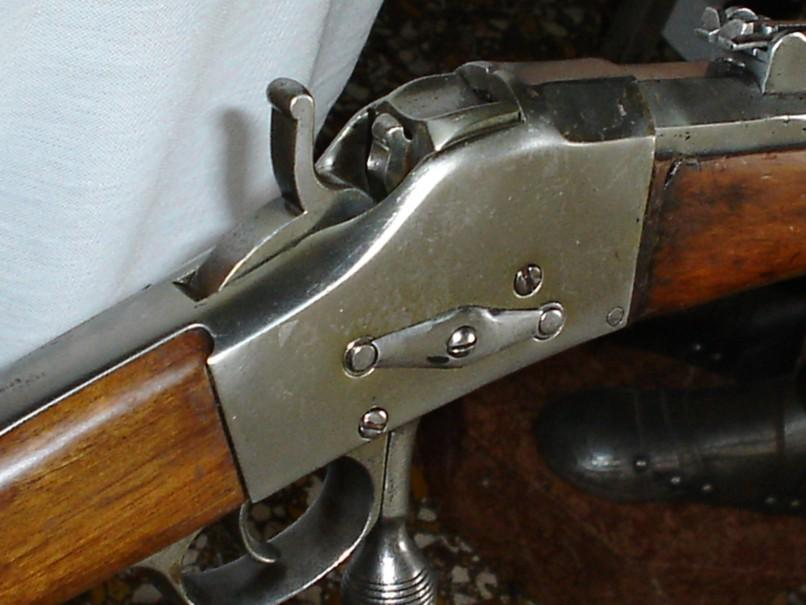

== Mylonas Weapons ==
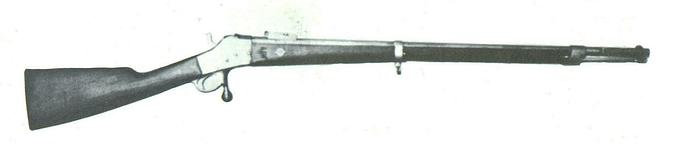
Mylonas (Rifle)

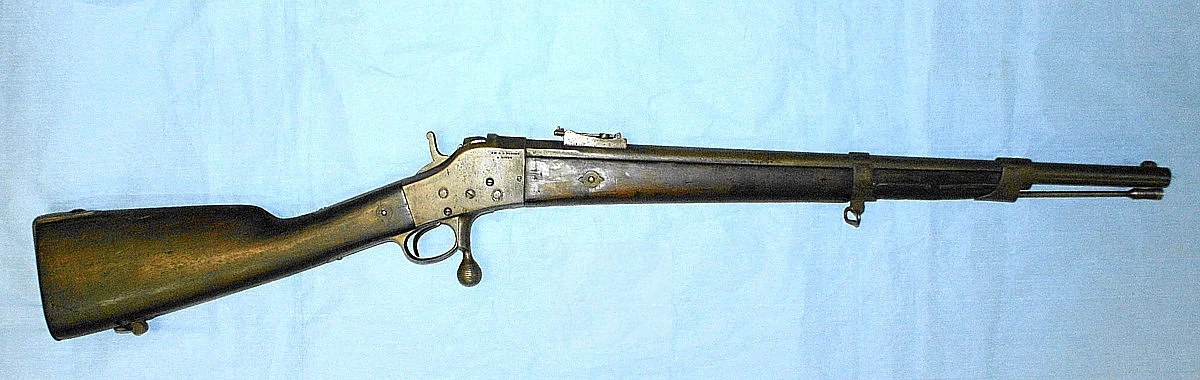
Mylonas (Carbine)

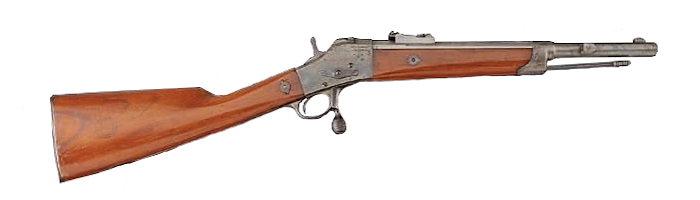
Mylonas (Short-barreled rifle)

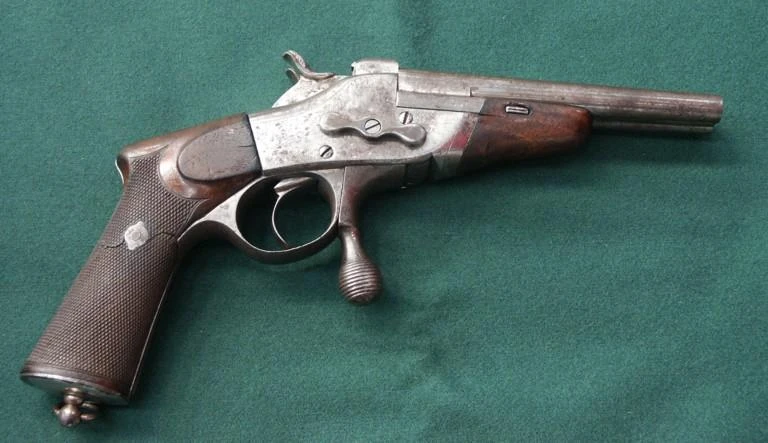
Mylonas (Pistol)
