= Mauser Model 1871 =

Mauser Model 1871 / Gewehr 71
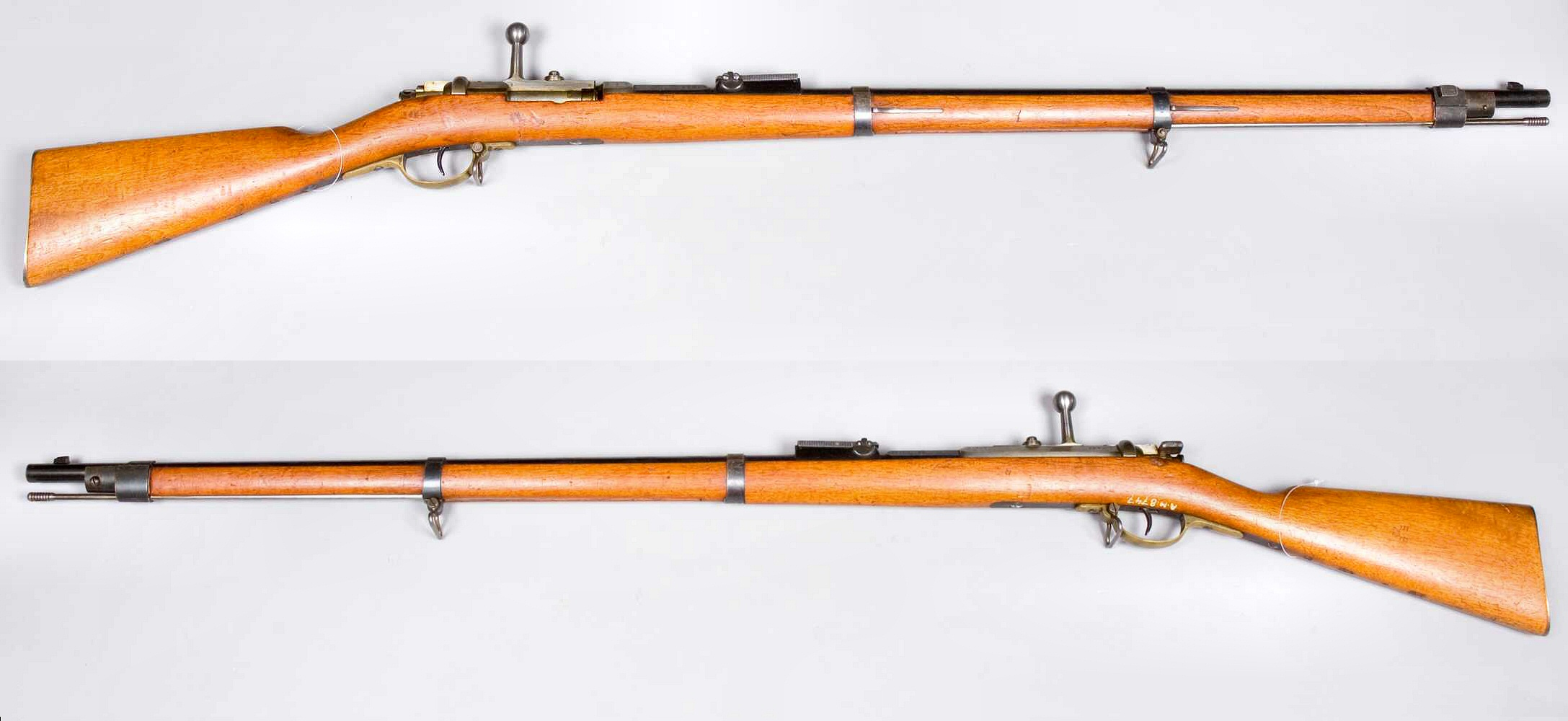
- Mauser Model 1871
- Type: Bolt action rifle
- Place of origin: German Empire

Service history
- In service: 1872–1888 (as the standard German service rifle); 1881–1945 (limited and foreign use)
- Used by: Germany; See Operators
- Wars: Argentine Civil Wars; First Boer War; Serbo-Bulgarian War; Second Franco-Dahomean War; First Sino-Japanese War; First Italo-Ethiopian War; Greco-Turkish War (1897); Uruguayan Revolution of 1897; Second Boer War; Boxer Rebellion; Balkan Wars; World War I; Easter Rising; German Revolution of 1918–19; World War II (limited)

Production history
- Designer: Mauser
- Designed: 1867–1871
- Manufacturer: Mauser; Steyr
- Produced: 1871–1890
- No. built: 3,000,000
- Variants: Jägerbüchse; Carbine; M1878/80 (Serbia); G.A.G. M1879 (Border Guards); M71/84; M1887 (Turkey); M80/07C (Serbia)

Specifications
- Mass: 4.5 kg (9.92 lbs)
- Length: 1,350 mm (53 in)
- Barrel length: 855 mm (33.7 in)
- Cartridge: 11.15×60R; 11.15×37R; 10.15×63R (Serbia); 7×57 (Serbia); 6.5×53.5R (Uruguay)
- Caliber: .43
- Action: Bolt action
- Muzzle velocity: 1,430 ft/s (440 m/s) (11×60mmR)
- Maximum firing range: 1,600 m (1,749.8 yd) (maximum setting on sights)
- Feed system: Single-shot; M80/07: 5-round stripper clip, internal magazine
- Sights: Iron sights graduated from 200 to 1,600 meters

The Mauser Model 1871, adopted as the Gewehr 71 or Infanterie-Gewehr 71, or "Infantry Rifle 71" ("I.G.Mod.71" was stamped on the rifles themselves), was the first rifle model in a distinguished line designed and manufactured by Paul Mauser and Wilhelm Mauser of the Mauser company and later mass-produced at Spandau arsenal.

== History ==
Paul Mauser developed his bolt-action rifle from 1867 to 1871. In 1870–71 trials with 2,500 test rifles took place, with the M1869 Bavarian Werder being the Mausers' chief competitor. The Mauser was provisionally adopted on 2 December 1871, pending the development of an appropriate safety. With support from the government's Spandau arsenal, the improvements to the safety mechanism were completed and the rifle was formally accepted on 14 February 1872 as Infantry Rifle Model 1871 by the German Empire, excluding Bavaria that adopted the Werder. The rifles were issued to the German Army from late 1873 to 1875, with approximately 1.82 million rifles and Jägerbüchse and 80,000–100,000 carbines produced. The Mauser 1871 was replaced by the magazine-fed, smokeless powder using Gewehr 1888 from 1888 through 1890.

== Design ==
The action was not based on its predecessor, the Dreyse needle gun which had seen service during the Franco-Prussian War of 1870–71, and which was found to have a number of weaknesses. The now well known Mauser "wing" type safety lever was developed for the Gewehr 71. The Gewehr 71 is a conventional-looking bolt action chambered in 11mm using black powder cartridges. The action included only a bolt guide rib as its single locking lug, locking forward of the receiving bridge. The original design was a single-shot.

A short version, the M1871 Jägerbüchse was developed for the Jäger or light infantry and served with engineers, fortress and navy units. It was a shortened and lightened M71. A Karabiner 1871 was also developed to equipped the German cavalry but did not enter full-scale production until 1876. A shorter version of the Model 1871, the M1879 Grenzaufsehergewehr, was issued to the border guards in 1880. It shot a unique 11.15×37.5mmR cartridge, a trimmed down version of the full-power military cartridge.

Various German arsenals and the Austrian company Steyr also manufactured the M71 rifle.

Serbia adopted a more up-to-date version of the rifle in 1881, the M1878/80, still single-shot, but chambered in its own 10.15×63R caliber. It had unique additions in that it had a bolt guide (much like the M1870 Italian Vetterli) and the "progressive rifling" (rifling which increases in twist rate as the bullet travels up the bore, to more gradually impart spin) developed by the Serbian Major Kosta "Koka" Milovanović (Коста "Кока" Миловановић), and it is commonly known as "Mauser-Koka", "Mauser-Milovanović", or "Kokinka" ("Кокинка"). The muzzle velocity of the Mauser-Koka was 1,680 feet per second (510 m/s). It saw first combat in the Serbo-Bulgarian War. Approximately 110,000 Mauser-Koka rifles entered the Serbian arsenal. Starting 1907, about half of these were converted in Kragujevac to shoot the 7×57mm from a 5-shot box magazine; the new barrels were purchased from Steyr. Both the old and new guns (designated M80/07) saw action in the Balkan Wars and World War I. The converted M80/07 are often referred to as "Đurić Mausers" (Ђурић-Маузер).

== Service ==
The M71 was used by the Korean Empire Army (especially Guard units—this rifle replaced the Russian Berdan rifle). The number of rifles used is uncertain but the Korean Empire manufactured ammunition for them, which means that the Korean Empire used a respectable number of them. From 1876, the Chinese Qing dynasty bought M71 rifles and carbines from Mauser, Steyr and Spangenberg & Sauer. After the Germans adopted the Gewehr 1888, over 1,000,000 discarded Model 1871 and M71/84 were put into Chinese service.

The South African Republic secretly received many M71 rifles, which saw combat during the First Boer War, the Jameson Raid and the Second Boer War. Some rifles were smuggled to Ethiopia and they were used during the 1894–1896 war against the Italians.

In 1894, Uruguay had their stockpile of M71 rifles converted to smokeless 6.5×53.5mm SR (Daudeteau system) by Société Française d'Armes Portatives Saint Denis in France. They were given new stocks, barrels, sights, bands, and side-mounted cleaning rods. However, the initial batch of ammunition that was sent with the rifles was incorrect and unusable in the guns.

The M71 saw service during the Boxer Rebellion. The Chinese units used the old M71 while German forces used the M71/84. The Chinese also used the M71 during the First Sino-Japanese War and the Xinhai Revolution.

Serbia and Turkey used their M71-based Mausers in the Balkan Wars and during World War I. The M71 Jäger rifles saw service in African theatre of World War I, being the standard rifle of the Schutztruppe. At the same time, the Gewehr 71 with incendiary bullets were used to shoot down observation balloons and German home-guard units were still equipped with M71/84 rifles. Some of these rifles were used during the German Revolution of 1918–19 and surviving rifles were distributed to the Volkssturm units in 1945.

The M71 was also exported to Japan for testing and was used to improve the design of the Murata rifle. Uruguay, Siam and Honduras also fielded the M71 from the 1880s. Venezuela bought 27,000 M71/84 rifles after they were retired from front-line German service, while Ecuador acquired 12,000 M71/84s.

Irish Republicans imported some 1,500 single-shot 1871 Mausers in the Howth gun-running for the nationalist militia called the Irish Volunteers in 1914. They were used in action by the Volunteers in the Easter Rising of 1916, the rebellion aimed at ending British rule in Ireland which began the Irish War of Independence. The 1871 Mauser became known in Ireland as the "Howth Mauser".

== Comparison with contemporary rifles ==
Comparison of 1880s rifles
Calibre	System	Country	Velocity					Height of trajectory				Ammunition	
Calibre	System	Country	Muzzle	500 yd (460 m)	1,000 yd (910 m)	1,500 yd (1,400 m)	2,000 yd (1,800 m)	500 yd (460 m)	1,000 yd (910 m)	1,500 yd (1,400 m)	2,000 yd (1,800 m)	Propellant	Bullet
.433 in (11.0 mm)	Werndl–Holub rifle	Austria-Hungary	1,439 ft/s (439 m/s)	854 ft/s (260 m/s)	620 ft/s (190 m/s)	449 ft/s (137 m/s)	328 ft/s (100 m/s)	8.252 ft (2.515 m)	49.41 ft (15.06 m)	162.6 ft (49.6 m)	426.0 ft (129.8 m)	77 gr (5.0 g)	370 gr (24 g)
.45 in (11.43 mm)	Martini–Henry	United Kingdom	1,315 ft/s (401 m/s)	869 ft/s (265 m/s)	664 ft/s (202 m/s)	508 ft/s (155 m/s)	389 ft/s (119 m/s)	9.594 ft (2.924 m)	47.90 ft (14.60 m)	147.1 ft (44.8 m)	357.85 ft (109.07 m)	85 gr (5.5 g)	480 gr (31 g)
.433 in (11.0 mm)	Fusil Gras mle 1874	France	1,489 ft/s (454 m/s)	878 ft/s (268 m/s)	643 ft/s (196 m/s)	471 ft/s (144 m/s)	348 ft/s (106 m/s)	7.769 ft (2.368 m)	46.6 ft (14.2 m)	151.8 ft (46.3 m)	389.9 ft (118.8 m)	80 gr (5.2 g)	386 gr (25.0 g)
.433 in (11.0 mm)	Mauser Model 1871	Germany	1,430 ft/s (440 m/s)	859 ft/s (262 m/s)	629 ft/s (192 m/s)	459 ft/s (140 m/s)	388 ft/s (118 m/s)	8.249 ft (2.514 m)	48.68 ft (14.84 m)	159.2 ft (48.5 m)	411.1 ft (125.3 m)	75 gr (4.9 g)	380 gr (25 g)
.408 in (10.4 mm)	M1870 Italian Vetterli	Italy	1,430 ft/s (440 m/s)	835 ft/s (255 m/s)	595 ft/s (181 m/s)	422 ft/s (129 m/s)	304 ft/s (93 m/s)	8.527 ft (2.599 m)	52.17 ft (15.90 m)	176.3 ft (53.7 m)	469.9 ft (143.2 m)	62 gr (4.0 g)	310 gr (20 g)
.397 in (10.08 mm)	Jarmann M1884	Norway and Sweden	1,536 ft/s (468 m/s)	908 ft/s (277 m/s)	675 ft/s (206 m/s)	504 ft/s (154 m/s)	377 ft/s (115 m/s)	7.235 ft (2.205 m)	42.97 ft (13.10 m)	137.6 ft (41.9 m)	348.5 ft (106.2 m)	77 gr (5.0 g)	337 gr (21.8 g)
.42 in (10.67 mm)	Berdan rifle	Russia	1,444 ft/s (440 m/s)	873 ft/s (266 m/s)	645 ft/s (197 m/s)	476 ft/s (145 m/s)	353 ft/s (108 m/s)	7.995 ft (2.437 m)	47.01 ft (14.33 m)	151.7 ft (46.2 m)	388.7 ft (118.5 m)	77 gr (5.0 g)	370 gr (24 g)
.45 in (11.43 mm)	Springfield model 1884	United States	1,301 ft/s (397 m/s)	875 ft/s (267 m/s)	676 ft/s (206 m/s)	523 ft/s (159 m/s)	404 ft/s (123 m/s)	8.574 ft (2.613 m)	46.88 ft (14.29 m)	142.3 ft (43.4 m)	343.0 ft (104.5 m)	70 gr (4.5 g)	500 gr (32 g)
.40 in (10.16 mm)	Enfield-Martini	United Kingdom	1,570 ft/s (480 m/s)	947 ft/s (289 m/s)	719 ft/s (219 m/s)	553 ft/s (169 m/s)	424 ft/s (129 m/s)	6.704 ft (2.043 m)	39.00 ft (11.89 m)	122.0 ft (37.2 m)	298.47 ft (90.97 m)	85 gr (5.5 g)	384 gr (24.9 g)

== Operators ==
- Colombia: Model 71
- China: Model 71
- Dahomey: Model 71
- Dominican Republic: Model 71
- Ecuador: Model 71/84
- Ethiopian Empire: Model 71
- Canada: Models 71/84, Quebec Home Guard use (rifles marked Q.H.G.)
- Germany: Models 71,b79 and 71/84
- Nazi Germany: Model 71/84
- Honduras: Model 71
- Irish Republic: Model 71
- Japan: Model 71
- Korea: Model 71
- Serbia: Model 71 and Mauser-Koka
- Ottoman Empire: Model 87
- Transvaal: Model 71
- Thailand: Model 71, Model 71/84
- Uruguay: Model 71
- Venezuela: Model 71/84

== In fiction and popular culture ==
11-mm Mauser is the service rifle of the Martian Army in The Sirens of Titan by Kurt Vonnegut. However, the book states these were bought as surplus from the Spanish–American War, which would in fact make them Model 1893 7×57mm Mauser.

In the film The Last Samurai, the Japanese Imperial Army carries German bolt-action Mauser M1871/84 rifles. The 1884 models were altered in appearance by the filmmakers to resemble the more period-accurate 1871 models.

== Gallery ==
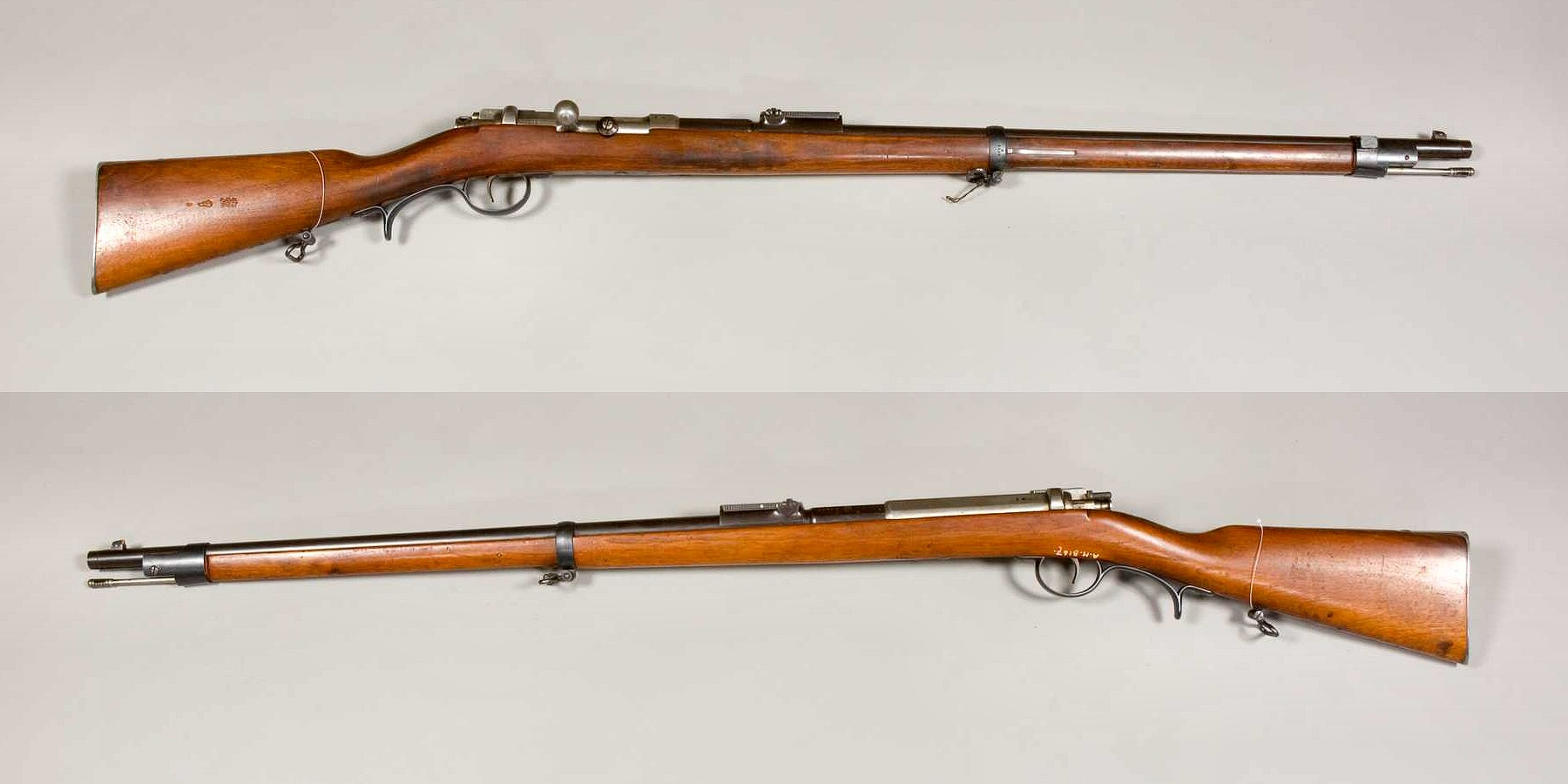
Mauser Model 1871 for Jäger units

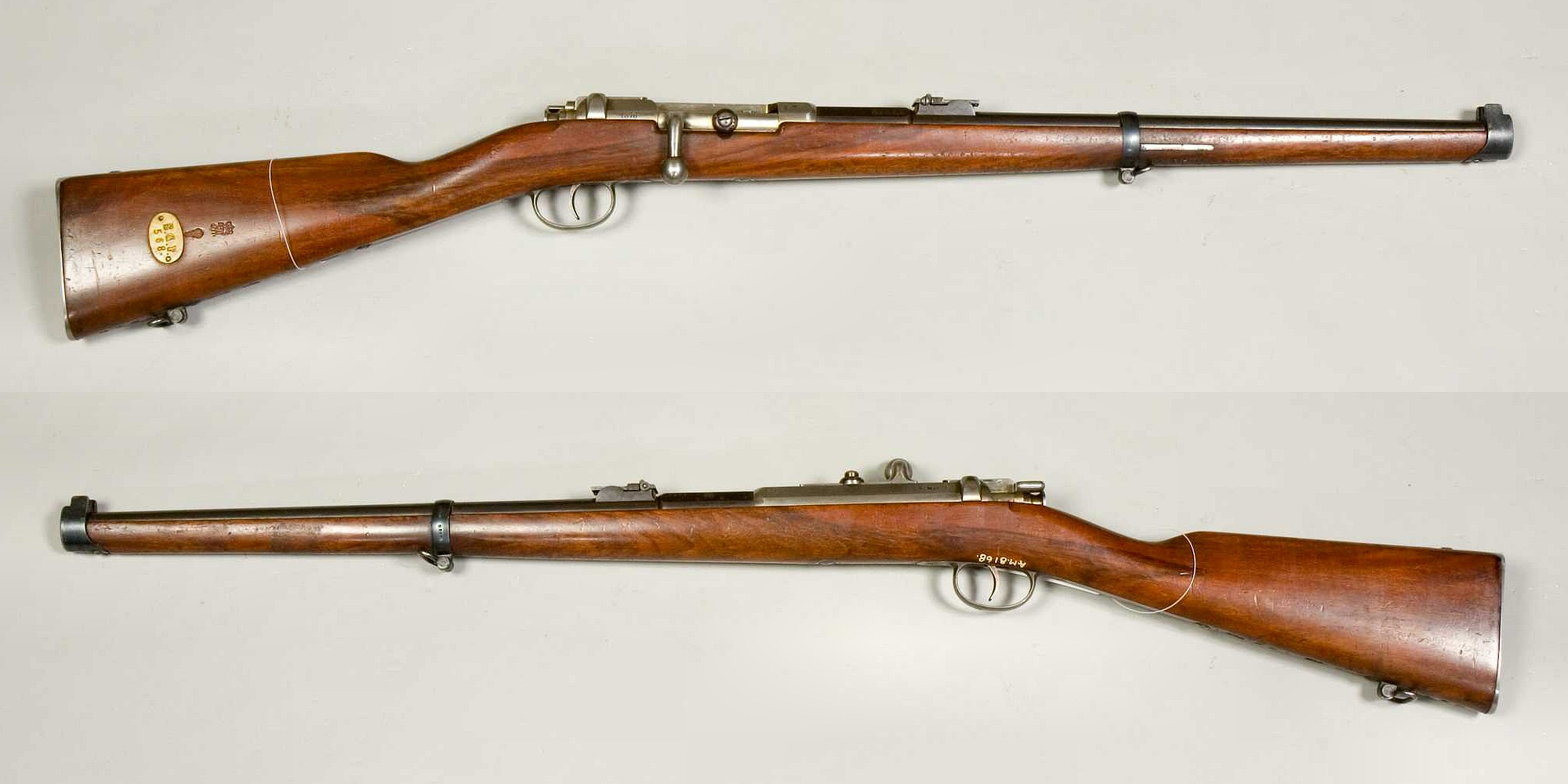
Mauser Model 1871 cavalry carbine

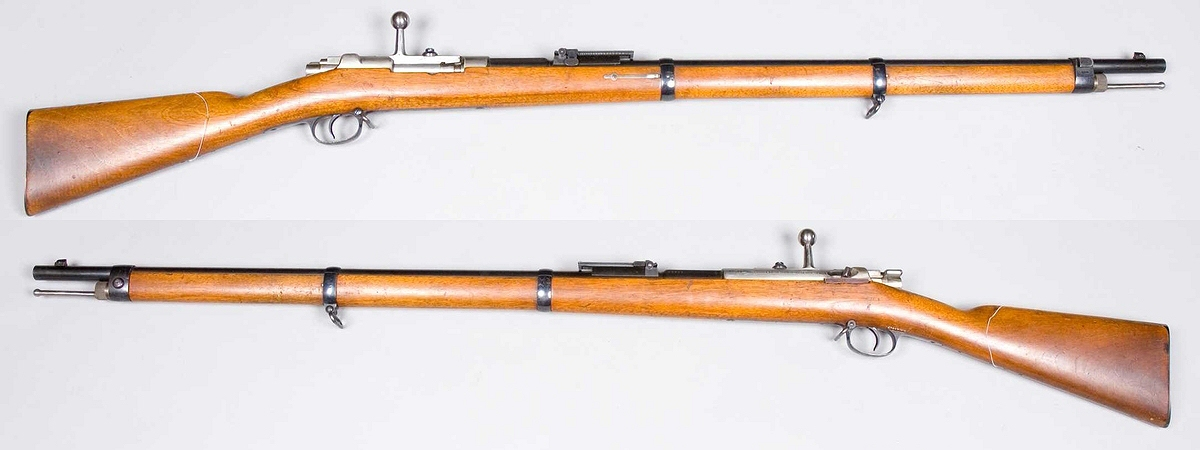
Mauser Model 1871/84

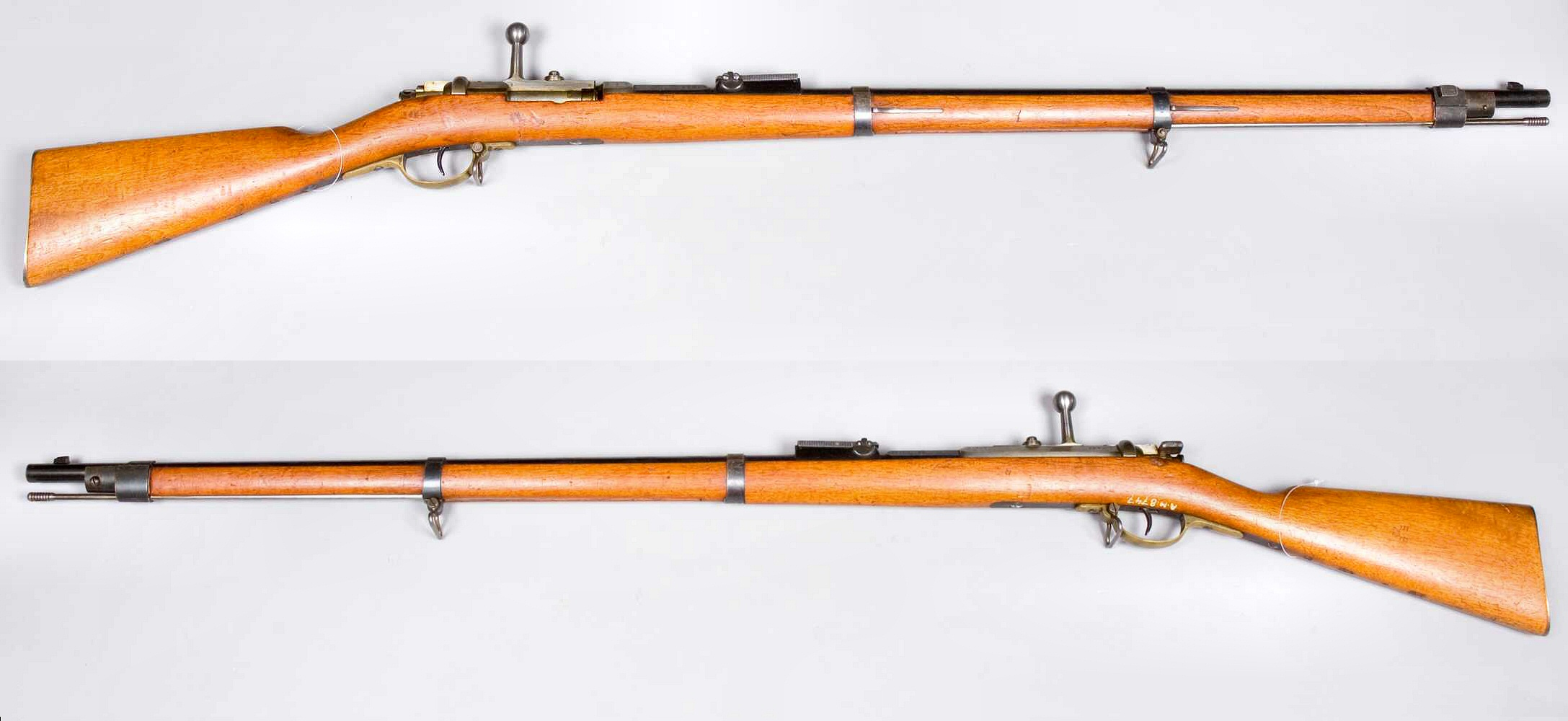
Mauser Model 1871

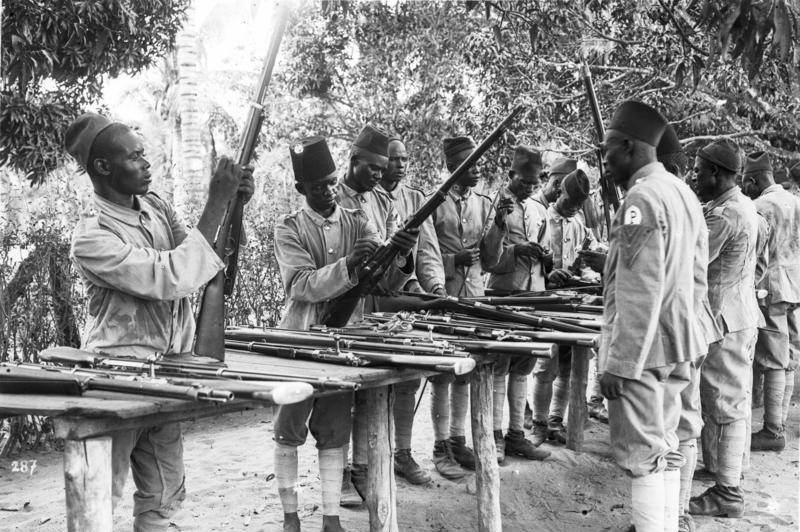
Askari troops in German East Africa armed with Model 1871s

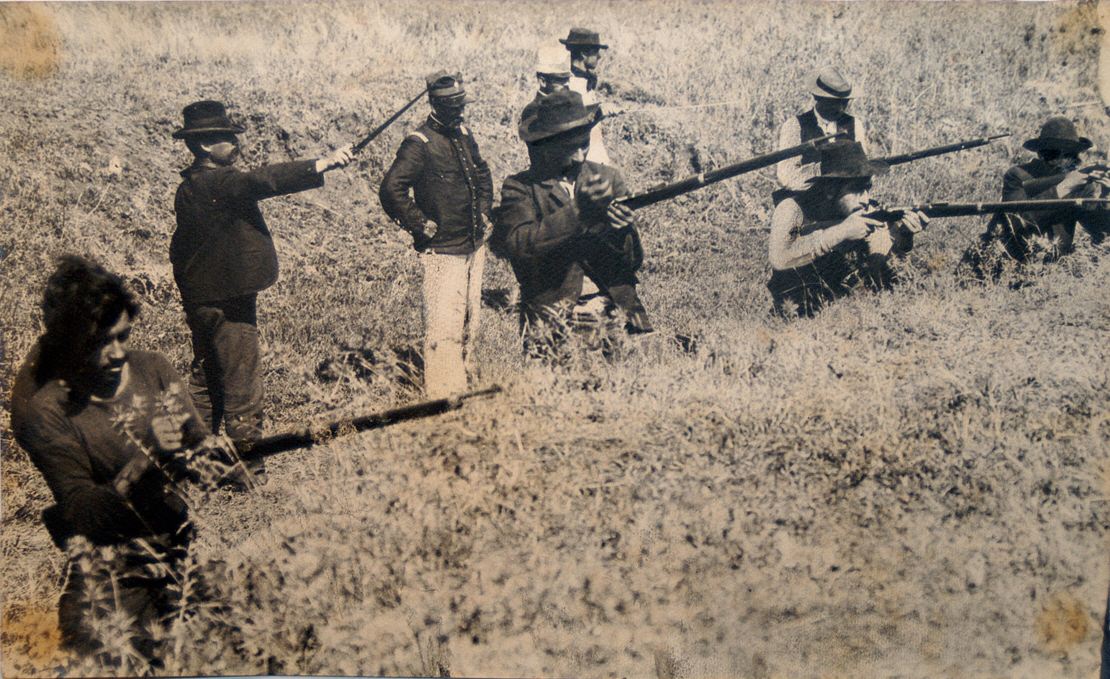
Uruguayan Soldiers Firing their M1871/94 Daudeteau Converted Rifles

== See also ==
- List of firearms
