= Alfred von Kropatschek =

Austrian general

Alfred Ritter von Kropatschek
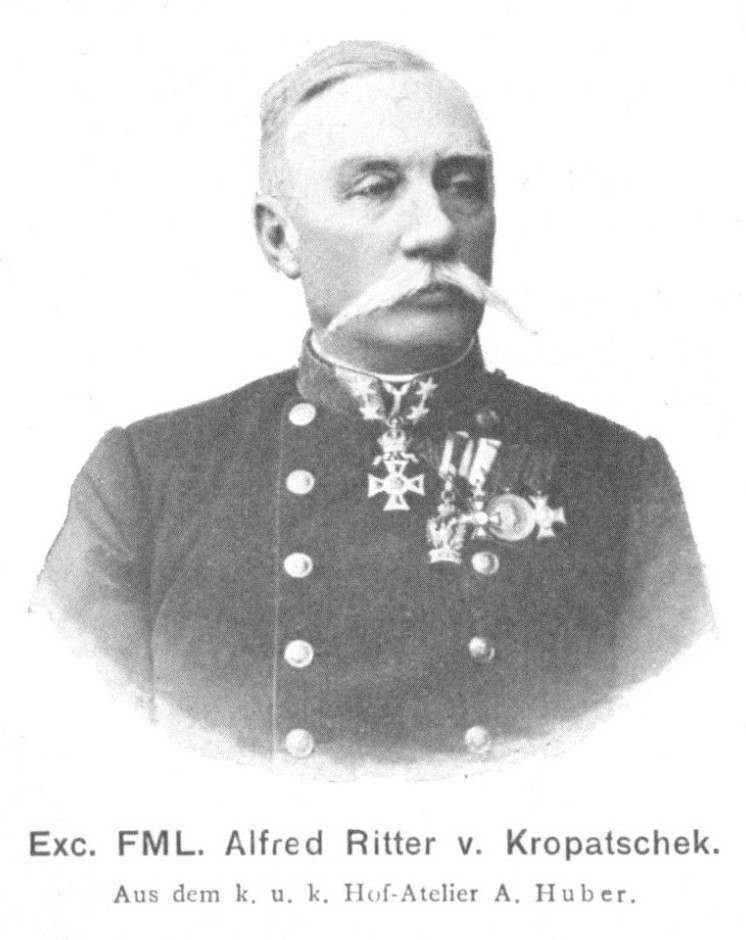
- Born: Alfred Kropatschek; January 30, 1838; Bielsko, Austrian Empire (present day Poland)
- Died: May 2, 1911 (aged 73); Lovran, Austria-Hungary (present day Croatia)
- Occupations: Inventor, General

Alfred Ritter von Kropatschek (Bielitz, January 30, 1838 – Lovran, May 2, 1911) was a general in the Austrian Army and a weapons designer of the late 19th century, who was responsible for several rifle and revolver designs in affiliation with the Steyr Mannlicher; these weapons were used by the armed forces of the Austrian Empire and several other nations. His rifles feature a tubular magazine under the barrel similar to a Winchester rifle; the cartridge lifter was the key to the Kropatschek design. One of his designs was sold to the French Navy, and was later adapted by the French Army in the development of the prolific Lebel rifle, which served as France's front-line rifle from 1886 through the First World War. According to historian Roger A Pauly, some people joked that more bullets from Kropatschek-designed rifles were fired at the Austrians, than by them. Kropatschek's tubular magazine design was also adapted to the German Mauser Model 1871 rifle, resulting in the Model 71/84.

Kropatschek was a contemporary of Ferdinand Mannlicher in their affiliations with the Steyr munitions company, but they had competing designs. The Steyr Kropatschek rifles featured the tubular magazine and the Steyr Mannlicher rifles featured a box magazine. The limiting factors of the tubular magazines were: a risk of pointed tip bullets firing the primer of the next cartridge in the tube, decrease in magazine capacity in short weapons such as carbines (shorter tubes), a shift in the rifle's point of balance as the magazine is depleted, and lack of any significant firing speed advantage in prolonged engagements over single-shot weapons (since cartridges had to be loaded one by one in contrast to magazines designed to use clips). An advantage of the box magazine is quick reloading by inserting a full en bloc or stripper clip.

== Rifle and revolver designs ==
=== Austria-Hungary ===
Model 1881 Gendarmarie Carbine (also known as "M1874/81")
1881 Type Trials Rifles

=== France ===
Model 1878 Navy rifle (Fusil de Marine Mle 1878),
Model 1884 Infantry Rifle (Fusil d'Infanterie Mle 1884),
Model 1885 Infantry Rifle (Fusil d'Infanterie Mle 1885).

=== Portugal ===
Model 1886 8 mm Infantry Rifle (Espingarda de Infantaria 8 mm m/1886),
Model 1886/89 8 mm Infantry Rifle with heat protecting handguard for colonial use (Espingarda de Infantaria 8 mm m/1886/89),
Model 1886 8 mm Light Infantry Carbine (Carabina de Caçadores 8 mm m/1886)
Model 1886 8 mm Cavalry Carbine (Carabina de Cavalaria 8 mm m/1886).
