= Gewehr 1888 =

German bolt-action rifle

Model 1888 commission rifle / Gewehr 88
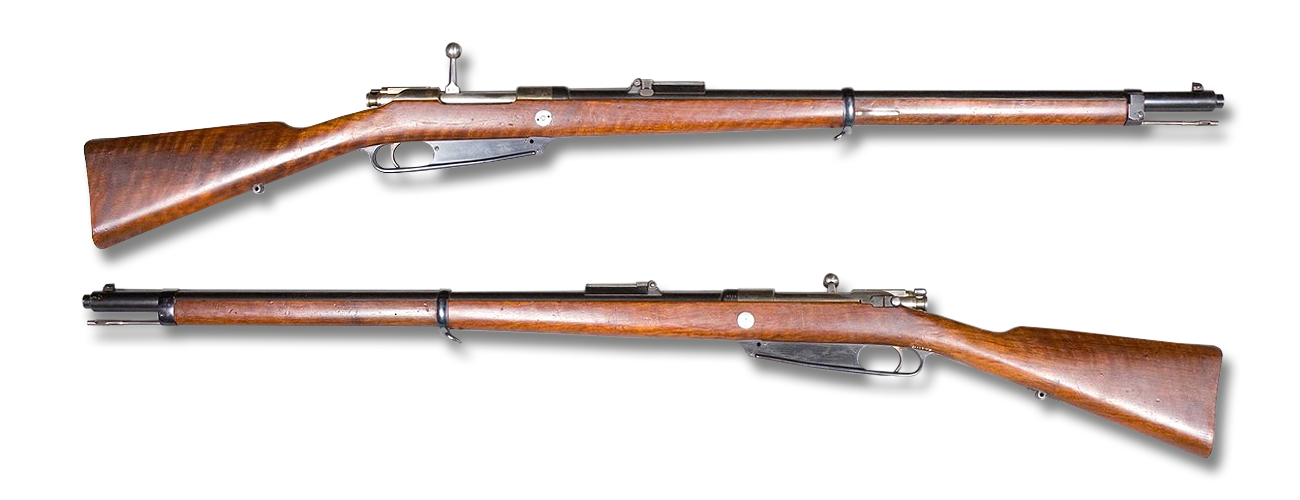
- Type: Service rifle
- Place of origin: German Empire

Service history
- In service: 1888−1945
- Used by: 25+ countries See Users
- Wars: 25+ wars See Conflicts

Production history
- Designer: German Rifle Commission
- Manufacturer: Ludwig Loewe, C.G. Haenel, ŒWG, Imperial Arsenals of Amberg, Danzig, Erfurt, and Spandau, Hanyang Arsenal
- Produced: 1888–1899
- No. built: 2,800,000
- Variants: Gewehr 88/05, Gewehr 88/14, Karabiner 88, Hanyang 88

Specifications
- Mass: 3.9 kg (8.6 lb); 3.1 kg (6 lb 13 oz) (Karabiner 88)
- Length: 1,245 mm (49.0 in); 950 mm (37 in) (Karabiner 88)
- Barrel length: 740 mm (29.1 in); 490 mm (19 in) (Karabiner 88)
- Cartridge: M/88; 7.92×57mm Mauser from Gewehr 88/05 onwards 7×57mm Mauser(Karabiner 88;A small amount is exported to Brazil)
- Action: Bolt action
- Muzzle velocity: With m/88 620 m/s (2066 fps), 8mm Mauser 868 m/s (2847 fps)
- Feed system: 5 round clip in a fixed external magazine

The Gewehr 88 (commonly called the Model 1888 commission rifle) was a late 19th-century German bolt-action rifle, adopted in 1888.

The invention of smokeless powder in the late 19th century immediately rendered all of the large-bore black powder rifles then in use obsolete. To keep pace with the French (who had adopted smokeless powder "small bore" ammunition for their Lebel Model 1886 rifle) the Germans adopted the Gewehr 88 using its own new Patrone 88 cartridge, which was also designed by the German Rifle Commission. The rifle was one of many weapons in the arms race between the Germanic states and France, and with Europe in general. There were also two carbine versions, the Karabiner 88 for mounted troops and the Gewehr 91 for artillery. Later models provided for loading with stripper clips (Gewehr 88/05s and Gewehr 88/14s) and went on to serve in World War I to a limited degree. Unlike many German service rifles before and after, it was not developed by Mauser but the arms commission, and Mauser was one of the few major arms manufacturers in Germany that did not produce Gewehr 88s.

== Design ==
In 1886, fifteen years after their defeat by German forces in the Franco-Prussian War, the French Army introduced the new Lebel magazine rifle firing an 8 mm high-velocity projectile propelled by the new smokeless powder. This made Germany's rifle, the Mauser Model 1871, obsolete due to its large and slow 11 mm round propelled by black powder. The practical result was that the French rifle had greater accuracy and range, and needed cleaning much less often, giving French troops a tactical advantage over the German Army. In response the German Army's Rifle Testing Commission developed the Gewehr 88 which was adopted for service in 1888. For this reason the Gewehr 88 is also known as the "commission rifle," or "Kommissionsgewehr".

=== Cartridge ===
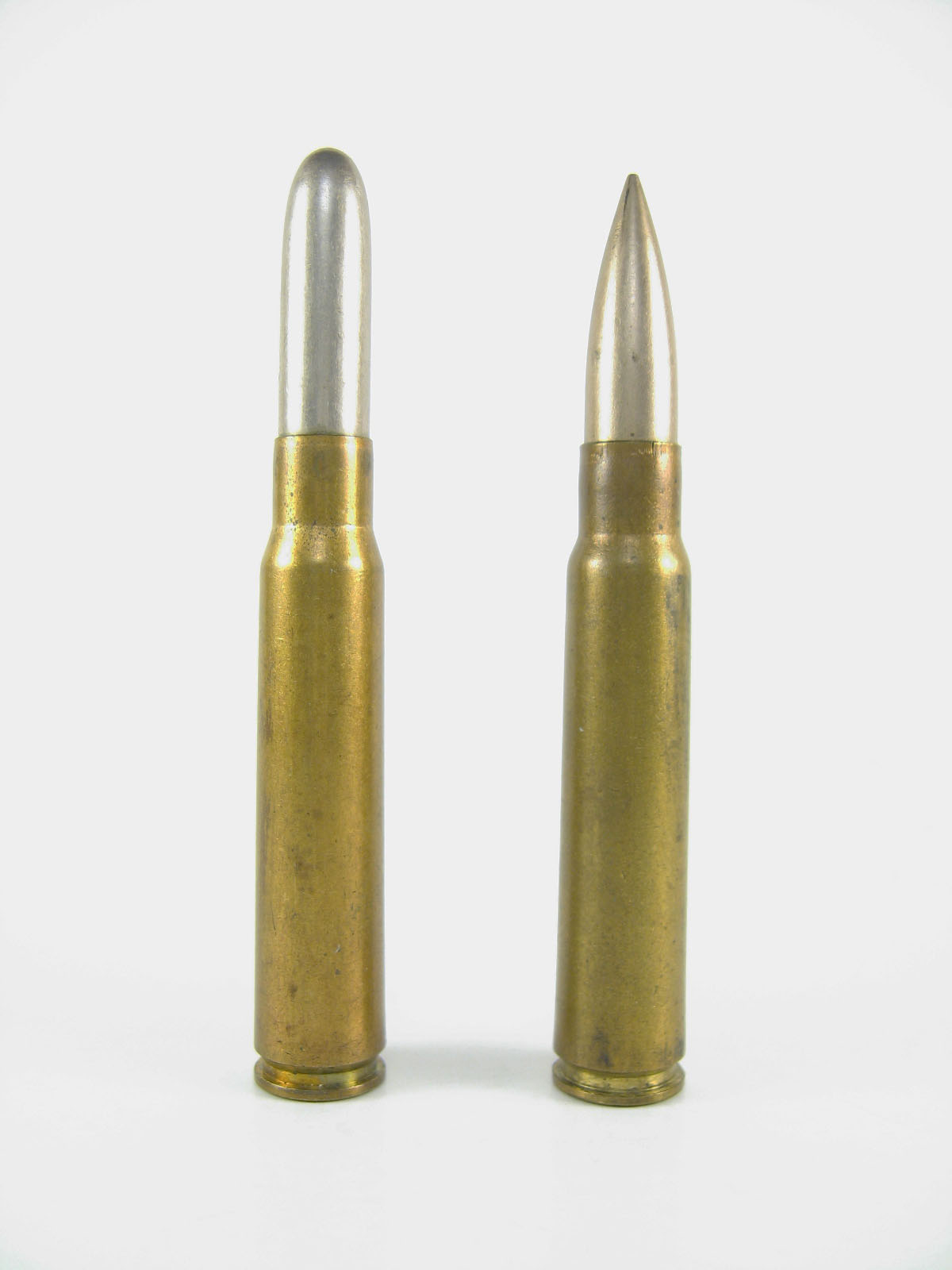
1888 pattern M/88 (left) alongside the 1905 pattern 7.92×57mm Mauser S Patrone

The first step was to select a new cartridge. This began by adapting a Swiss design, resulting in the Patrone 88 or M/88 of 1888, an 8 mm rimless "necked" cartridge (bullet diameter 8.08 mm/.318 in) loaded with an 8.08 mm (.318 in) 14.6 g (226 gr) round-nose bullet propelled by a single-base smokeless powder. In 1905, the 8 mm M/88 cartridge was replaced by the 7.92×57mm Mauser S Patrone (ball cartridge) which was loaded with a new 8.20 mm (.323 in) 9.9 g (154 gr) spitzer bullet and more powerful double-base smokeless powder, resulting in nearly 40% higher muzzle velocity and 30% more muzzle energy.

=== Receiver and magazine ===
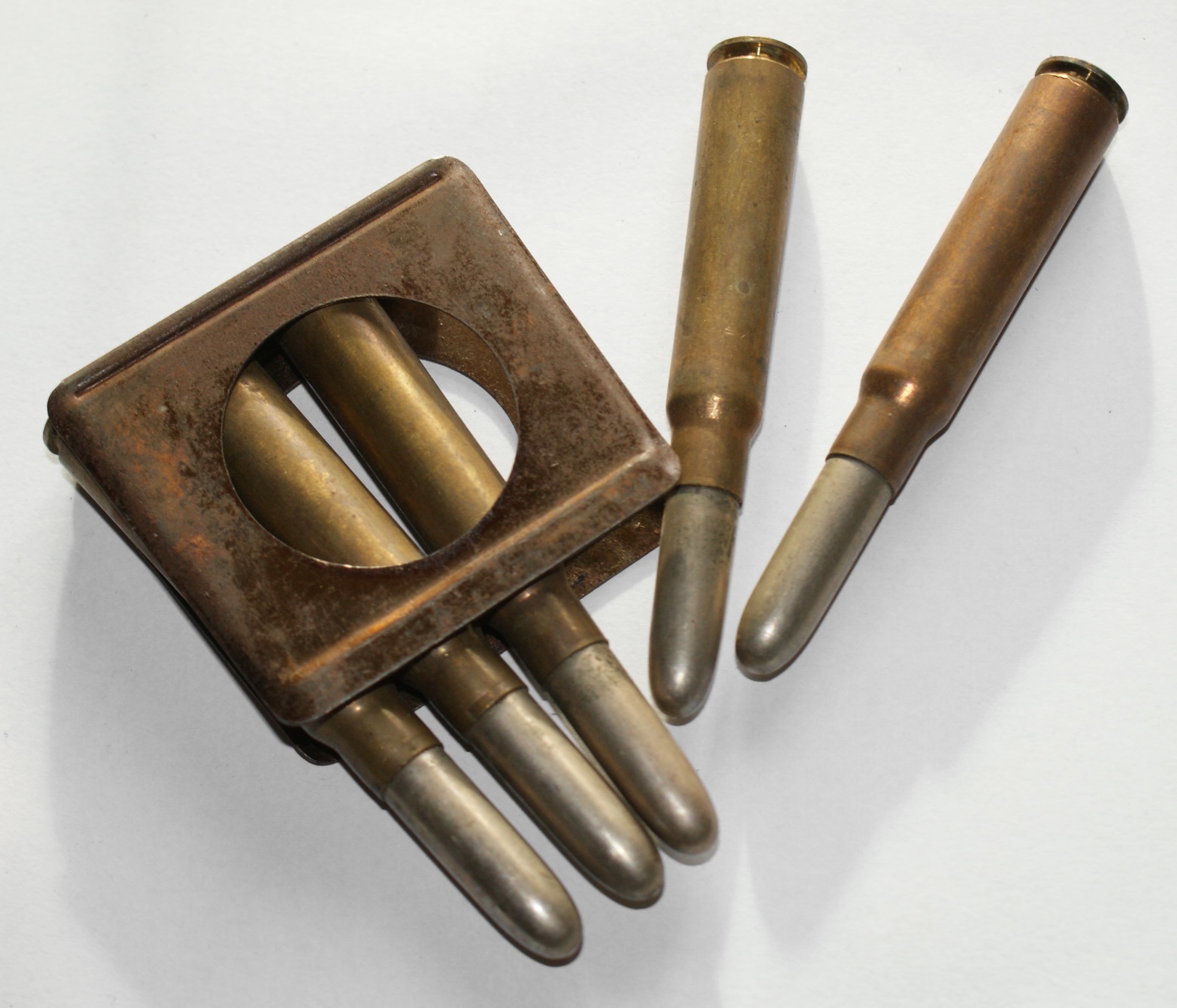
Five-round clip with 1888 pattern M/88 ammunition

The Gewehr 1888 is a further development of the receiver and bolt of the Gewehr 1871 combined with a Mannlicher magazine. It has a receiver with a "split bridge" (i.e., the bolt passes through the receiver and locks in front of the rear bridge); a rotating bolt head; and the characteristic Mannlicher-style "packet loading" or "en-bloc" system in which cartridges are loaded into a steel carrier (an en bloc clip) which is inserted into the magazine, where it holds the cartridges in alignment over a spring. As shots are fired the clip remains in place until the last round is chambered, at which point it drops through a hole in the bottom of the rifle. This system was used in almost all Mannlicher designs and derivatives, and while it allows for speedy reloading, it also creates an entry point for dirt. To settle a patent infringement claim by Steyr-Mannlicher, Germany contracted the Austro-Hungarian company to be one of the manufacturers of Gewehr 88s, and Mannlicher together with Otto Schönauer derived from the Mauser-Schlegelmilch design a whole family of turn-bolt actions, the last of which was serially produced until 1970s.

=== Bolt and barrel ===
The commission rifle's bolt action design was a commission modified Mauser action. The barrel design and rifling were virtually copied from the French Lebel. The rifle has an odd appearance as the entire 'floating' barrel is encased in a sheet metal tube for protection, but with the tube removed the rifle looks rather modern. This tube was intended to increase accuracy by preventing the barrel from directly contacting the stock, but in practice it increased the risk of rusting by providing a space for water to be trapped if the rifle was exposed to harsh conditions. The Karabiner 88 utilized a different bolt handle, which resembled those found on commercial sporting rifles.

== Service history ==
Some early models had flaws due to rushed ammunition production. This was used in 1892 by the then notorious anti-Semitic agitator Hermann Ahlwardt, member of the German Reichstag, to spread an anti-semitic conspiracy theory. Many of the Gewehr 88-rifles were produced by the armament manufacturer Loewe & Company, whose chairman was Jewish entrepreneur Isidor Loewe. Isidor Loewe also held a controlling interest in the Waffenfabrik Mauser. According to Ahlwardt's claims, Loewe would either deliberately supply the German army with insufficient rifles, or, along with other Jews, secretly exchange rifles with flawed ones after they had passed the reliability tests. Ahlwardt accused Loewe of being a spy for France, and denounced the rifle as a Judenflinte ("Jews' musket"). After these claims were found insupportable, Ahlwardt was sentenced to 4 months in prison for malicious falsehood.

Part of the production run was exported to China (see below) or Latin America (for example the Brazilian army used them in War of Canudos in 1896–1897). The commission rifle saw field service with Germany's colonial expansion, including in China during the Boxer Rebellion (with the Gewehr 88s and the unlicensed Hanyang 88 copies also being used by the opposing Chinese troops), and served as a front line weapon for German troops during World War I until 1915 when the supply of Gewehr 98s increased. When Germany replaced the 88 with the Gewehr 98, many of the rifles were given to Austria-Hungary and the Ottoman Empire during World War I because both states had a shortage of rifles (it was used extensively by the Turkish Army even through the 1930s and 1940s). Many Gewehr 88 rifles stayed in active service in second-line units, reserves, and in armies allied with the Germans through and well past World War I.

Most of the Gewehr 88s seen in the US are the ones that were given to the Turkish forces in World War I and have been modified from the original design. The Turks issued these and updated versions at least as late as the 1930s. Gewehr 88/05 rifles were also used by Yugoslavia, Czechoslovakia (for example as modified guard shotgun), and Poland. Gewehr 88 rifles have been used widely during post World War I revolutions, uprisings and wars (on both sides of the Russian Civil War, the German Revolution of 1918–19, the Revolutions and interventions in Hungary (1918–20), the Greater Poland Uprising (1918–19), the Silesian Uprisings, the Turkish War of Independence, the Polish–Soviet War, by the Ulster Volunteers and by Lithuanians in the Lithuanian Wars of Independence). About 5,500 Gewehr and Karabiner 88s were delivered to the Lithuanian Army in 1919–1920 (granted by Germany and sold by France and the UK). Used by the paramilitary Rifle Union, the rest were kept in the storage and were re-barreled before World War II. Inter-war Germany used Gewehr 88 rifles only for the militia. Gewehr 88 rifles were also used in the Spanish Civil War by both sides. At the beginning of World War II some Gewehr 88 rifles were still in use, by second line units or paramilitary organizations (or partisans) in Poland and Yugoslavia. Some of the ex-UVF rifles were used by Home Guard in the United Kingdom in 1940. Ethiopean rifles (some ex-UVF rifles also found their way there) also saw action during the East African Campaign. These rifles were also used by the German Volkssturm in 1944–1945.

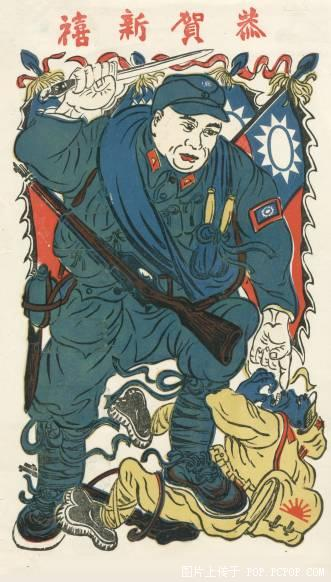
Gewehr 1888 and its copy Hanyang 88 were the main rifles in China for over 50 years.

China also used this rifle extensively during the Qing dynasty and the Republican era. China first bought Gewehr 88 rifles for the First Sino-Japanese War in 1894–1895 and after that started production of the unlicensed Hanyang 88 copy. In the beginning of the 20th century China bought for a second time a large number of original Gewehr 88 rifles. During the following 50 years, the rifle and its Hanyang 88 copy were used in the 1911 Revolution, the Chinese Civil War and the Second Sino-Japanese War and proved more than adequate against the Japanese Arisaka Type 38 rifle, though the latter was newer by 30 years. The last time they saw action in Chinese service was during the Korean War, where some of them were captured and taken to the US as souvenirs.

The rifle was adopted during a period of rapid development in firearms technology, and marked Germany's shift to a smokeless powder. This explains why its period as the primary German service rifle was just over a dozen years, but it remained in limited service for much longer. In 1898 a Mauser design was adopted, the Gewehr 98, which was the culmination of a series of Mauser models in the 1890s. It was a superior replacement using the same ammunition with a stronger powder charge. However, this rifle soon had to be converted to fire the new Spitzer round that Germany adopted after the turn of the century. With these modifications the newer design remained in use until the end of World War II.

The Gewehr 88 was also sometimes made into very elegant sporting rifles by gunsmiths in Germany. Examples of these usually show first-class workmanship and special features such as folding sights and altered bolt handles. Some Karabiner 88 carbines are known to have been produced in 7×57mm Mauser instead of the usual M/88 or the 7.92×57mm Mauser chambering. These were likely intended for sale in South America, where use of the 7×57mm cartridge was widespread. All known 7×57mm Karabiner 88s were produced by Haenel.

== Variants ==
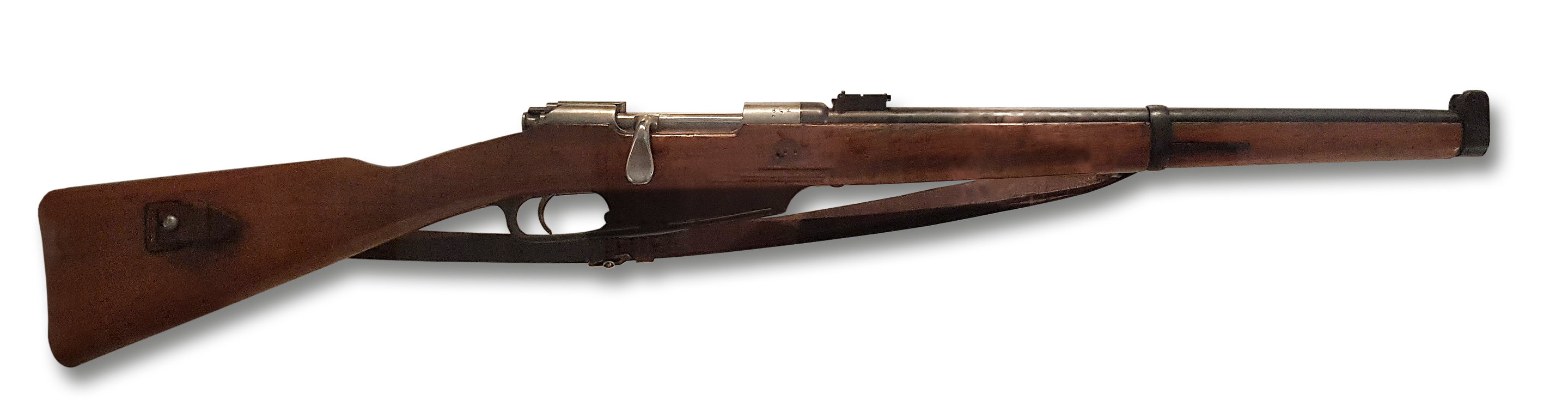
Karabiner 88, German bolt-action carbine variants of Gewehr 1888

At the time of adoption, the M/88 "Patrone 7.9 mm" was loaded with a 14.6 g (226 gr) round nose bullet that measured 8.08 mm (.318 in) in diameter. In 1894/95 the German Army changed the barrel specifications from 7.9/8.1 mm to 7.9/8.2 mm hoping to improve accuracy and Gewehr 88 rifles made from that date on had different bores. The 8.08 mm (.318 in) bullet diameter however remained unchanged. After 1895 most Gewehr 1888 rifles were regrooved. In 1903, the Germany Army adopted a new service cartridge that fired lighter bullets measuring 8.20 mm (.323 in) in diameter. From then on, many Gewehr 88 rifles were rechambered to fire the new 1903 pattern 7.92×57mm Mauser cartridge becoming Gewehr 88 S rifles. This rechambering required more work as the 7.92×57mm Mauser chambering required a wider chamber throat to take the thicker brass of the new 1903 pattern cartridge. 7.92×57mm Mauser adapted rifles have the receiver marked with a large "S" rollmark. From 1905 the rifles were also converted to use the Gewehr 98 type stripper clip by adding stripper clip guides to the top rear of the receiver and altering the magazine becoming Gewehr 88/05 rifles. After the start of World War 1, some of the remaining Gewehr 88 S rifles were modified to the Gewehr 88/14 standard, which was generally similar to Gewehr 88/05 but with cruder workmanship. Some 88's were sold to various nations or armed groups, or captured in combat and therefore a wide variety of markings can be found such as Bulgarian stars, English proofs, Turkish crescents and symbols, Polish eagles etc. Gew 88's were re-serialized by the army capturing them in some rare cases (i.e.; Greece/Turks) or/and when they were re-barrelled. The markings found on Gew 88's are very extensive and therefore are a topic of their own.

=== Modern ammunition use ===
The maximum operating pressure for the Gewehr 88 commission rifle is less than that of any 8 mm Mauser rifle, as the makers of the Gewehr 88 did not fully understand the greater energy of smokeless powder compared to black powder. Shooters planning to use modern 8 mm ammunition in a Gewehr 88 slug their bore and chamber as there are four different possible bores and grooves and chamber dimensioning combinations found on the Gewehr 88 rifle. High performance and hence high pressure or military ammunition designated for machine gun use cannot be fired safely in a Gewehr 88 commission rifle.

=== Schutztruppen Karabiner 1888 ===
This specific example was manufactured in 1893 at the Erfurt arsenal. During World War I, the Kar88 was still in use by secondary units and colonial troops, including the Schutztruppe in German Africa. These forces often modified their weapons to suit harsh environmental conditions. This particular Kar88 was captured by British forces in Togo in 1914. It originally featured a curved bolt handle, but it was later replaced with a straight bolt.

== Defects ==
Although the packet loading system proved to be a design shortcoming, it is not uncommon to encounter a Gewehr 88 today which still retains it. Some of them were modified to use the stripper clips used with the Gewehr 98 by milling a slot into the left side of the action and adding stripper clip guides on the top of the receiver. Through this slot projects a bar which retains the cartridges in place against the magazine spring's pressure. The hole in the bottom of the rifle is often covered with a small piece of sheet metal.

Unlike many rifles designed later, the bolt head of this rifle is able to be removed from the bolt body. This piece could be removed during disassembly, and was frequently lost. Additionally, both the ejector and the extractor that are attached to the bolt head are prone to falling out if care is not taken during disassembly and reassembly.

== Users ==
- Argentina: 5000 bought in 1892 (before all the adopted 1891 Mausers were delivered) due to worries about a Chilean invasion. Later sold to Peru
- Austria-Hungary
- Brazil: Adopted in 1892. In 1894 the Mauser Model 1893 was adopted to replace it, the Gewehr 1888 was still in use alongside the Mauser and Comblain during the War of Canudos
- Kingdom of Bulgaria
- Czechoslovakia
- Ecuador
- Ethiopian Empire: Obtained after 1896 from German and Belgian arms dealers
- France: Captured carbines were issued to second-line soldiers, such as car drivers
- German Empire
- Nazi Germany: Used by Volkssturm
- Kingdom of Greece
- Haganah
- Irish Republic
- Malayan National Liberation Army: Karabiner 88 variant, supplied by Soviet Union only in small numbers
- Orange Free State
- Ottoman Empire
- Peru: 12000 Gewehr 1888 rifles and 2000 Karabiner 88s ordered from Steyr in 1896
- Second Polish Republic
- Qing dynasty
- Republic of China: Nationalists, warlords and anti-Japanese guerillas used the Hanyang 88, a copy of the Gewehr 1888
- South African Republic
- Republic of Lithuania About 5,500 rifles and carbines from 1919 to 1940
- Spanish Republic: Acquired approximately 2,000 through Poland during the Spanish Civil War
- Turkey: Received during World War I, leftover Ottoman stock used in Turkish War of Independence
- Kingdom of Yugoslavia
- United Kingdom: Used by Home Guard
- Ulster Volunteers

== Conflicts ==
- First Sino-Japanese War
- Revolta da Armada
- Federalist revolution
- War of Canudos
- Second Boer War
- Boxer Rebellion
- Herero Wars
- Maji Maji Rebellion
- Mexican Revolution
- Mexican Border War
- Chinese expedition to Tibet (1910)
- Xinhai Revolution
- World War I
- Easter Rising
- Warlord Era
- Russian Civil War
- German Revolution of 1918–19
- Revolutions and interventions in Hungary (1918–20)
- Greater Poland Uprising (1918–19)
- Polish–Soviet War
- Irish War of Independence
- Silesian Uprisings
- Turkish War of Independence
- Lithuanian Wars of Independence
- 1923 Revolution
- Sheikh Said rebellion
- Ararat rebellion
- Constitutionalist Revolution
- Chinese Civil War
- Second Italo-Ethiopian War
- Spanish Civil War
- Dersim rebellion
- Second Sino-Japanese War
- Sudeten German uprising 1938
- World War II
- 1948 Palestine war
- Malayan Emergency
- Korean War
- 1958 Lebanon crisis
- Lebanese Civil War

== Gallery ==
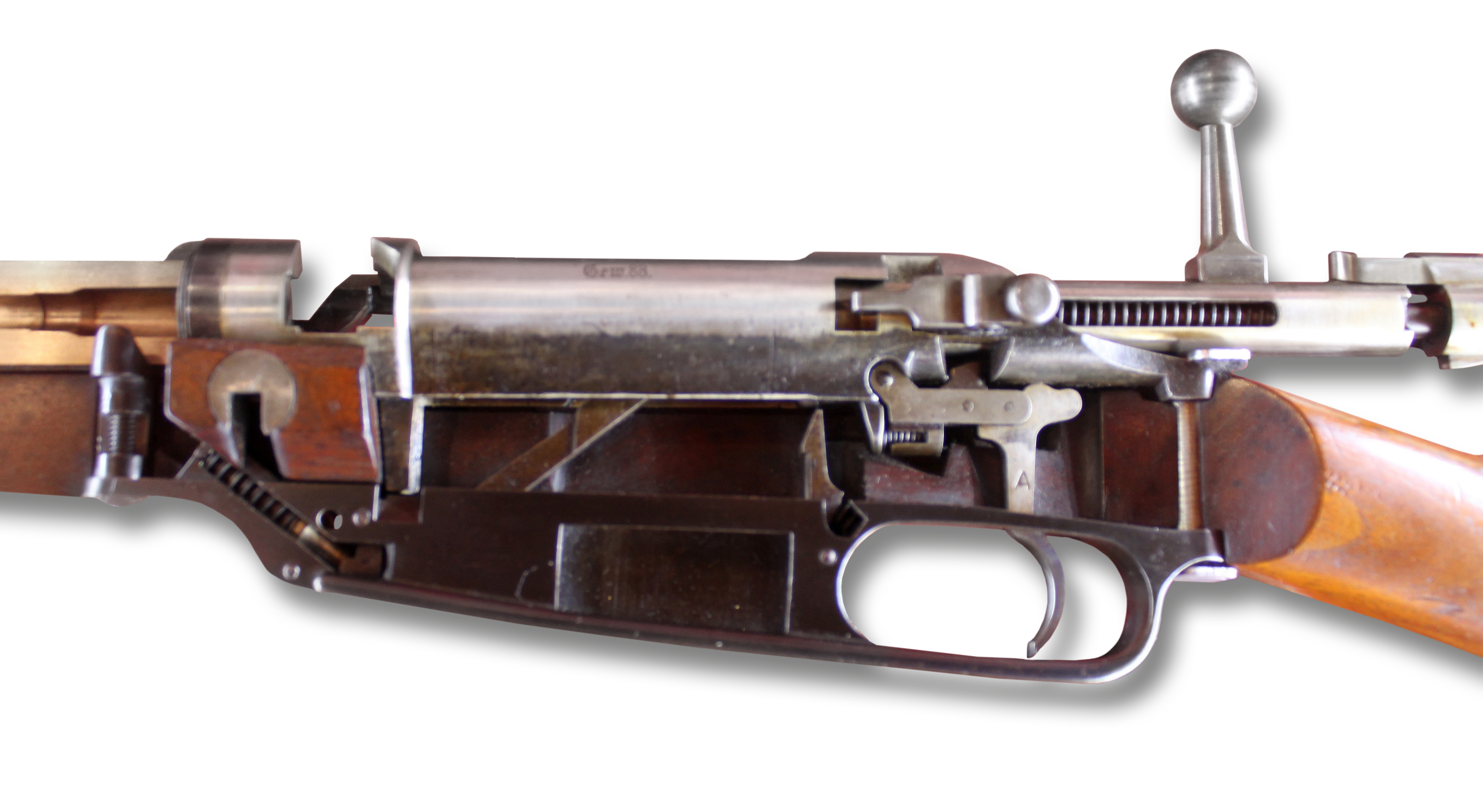
Cutaway model of the Gewehr 88

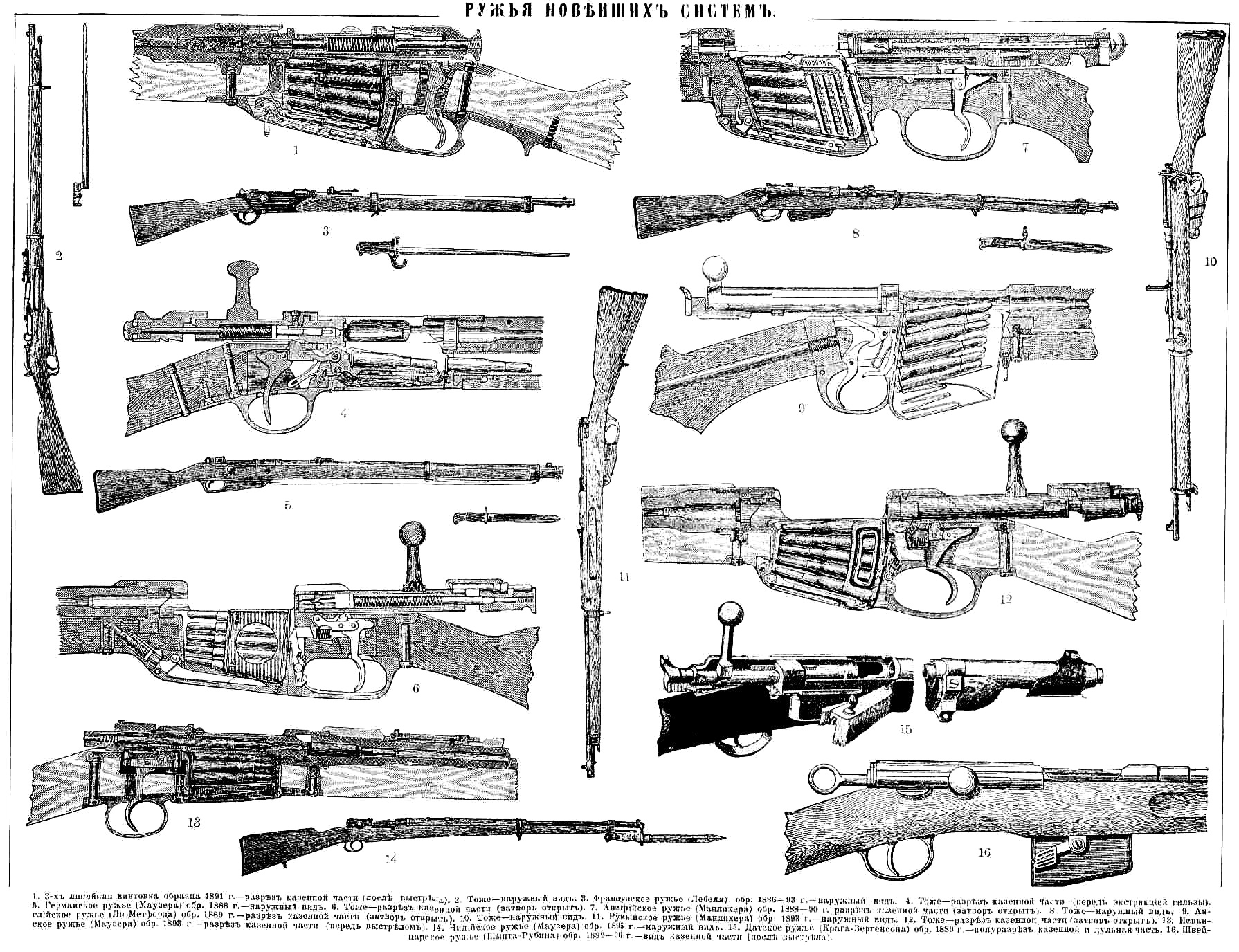
Schematic. Images #5 and #6

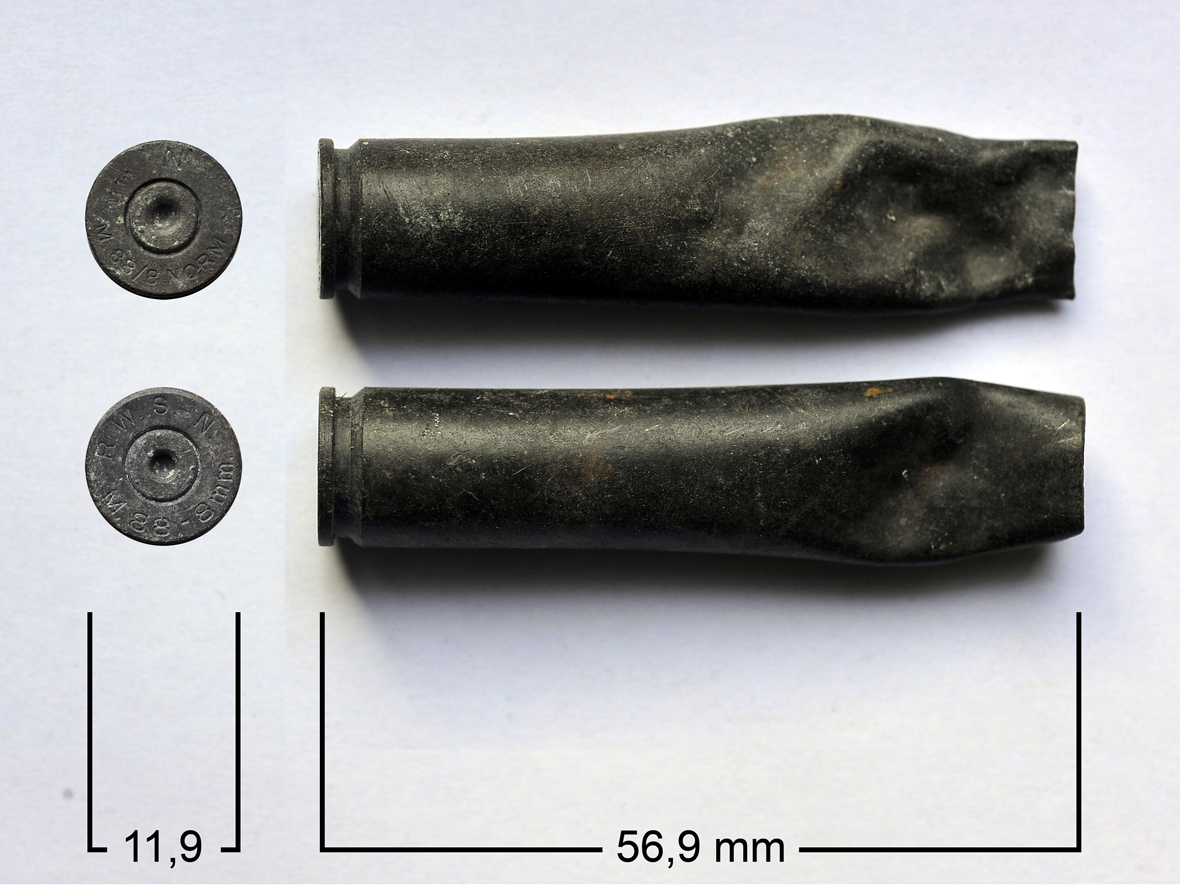
Cartridges M88

== See also ==
- List of infantry weapons of World War I
