= 11×59mmR Gras =

Rifle cartridge

11x59mmR French Gras
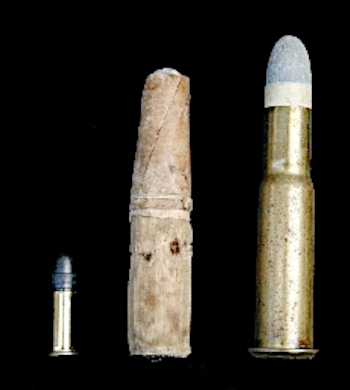
- .22LR, 11mm Paper Chassepot cartridge & 11×59mmR French Gras
- Type: Rifle
- Place of origin: France

Service history
- In service: 1874–1950s
- Used by: Various
- Wars: Various

Production history
- Produced: 1874–1950s

Specifications
- Case type: Rimmed, bottleneck
- Bullet diameter: 11.3 mm (0.44 in)
- Neck diameter: 11.9 mm (0.47 in)
- Shoulder diameter: 13.5 mm (0.53 in)
- Base diameter: 13.8 mm (0.54 in)
- Rim diameter: 16.9 mm (0.67 in)
- Rim thickness: 1.9 mm (0.075 in)
- Case length: 59 mm (2.3 in)
- Overall length: 76 mm (3.0 in)
- Case capacity: 6.17 cm^{3} (95.2 gr H_{2}O)

Ballistic performance
Bullet mass/type	Velocity	Energy
25 g (386 gr) Lead	455 m/s (1,490 ft/s)	2,580 J (1,900 ft⋅lbf)
- Source: Cartridges of the world.

11mm Vickers

Service history
- Used by: France & Great Britain
- Wars: World War I

Production history
- Manufacturer: Vickers Limited

The 11×59mmR Gras, also known as the 11mm Vickers, is a rifle cartridge. France's first modern military cartridge, the 11×59mmR Gras was introduced in 1874 and continued in service in various roles and with various users until after World War II.

== Design ==
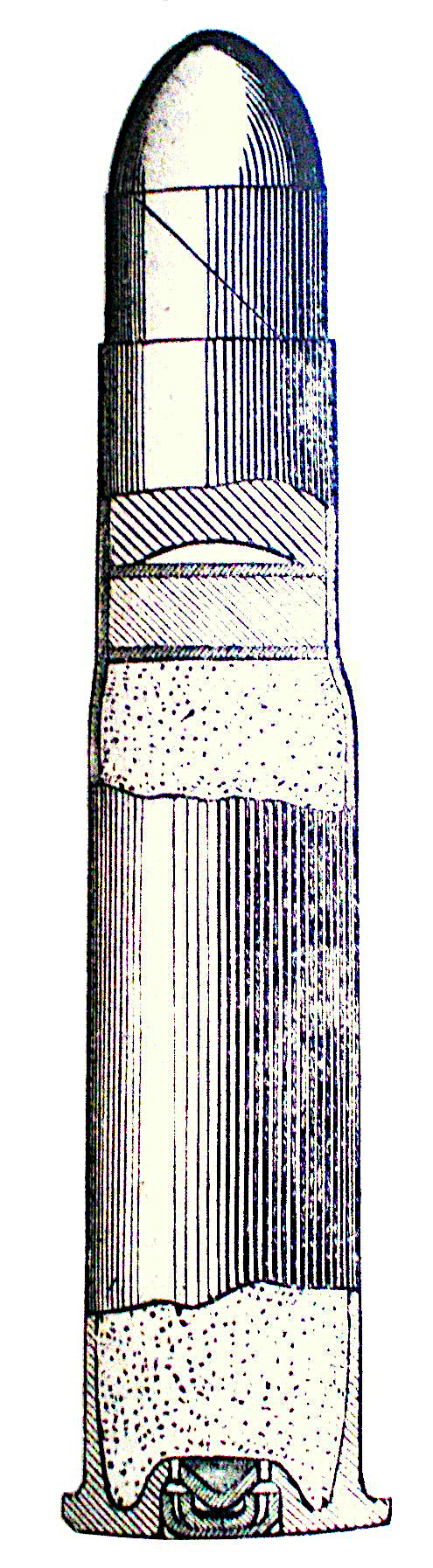
Cutaway diagram of the Berdan-primed cartridge

The 11×59mmR was a rimmed, slightly bottlenecked, centerfire rifle cartridge with an external Berdan primer, developed for use in the single shot, bolt actioned Fusil Gras mle 1874.

The original 1874 cartridge fired a paper patched, 25.0 g (386 gr), 27 mm (1.06 in) long lead bullet driven by 5.2 g (81 gr) of F1 black powder, with a muzzle velocity of 450 m/s (1,500 ft/s), the velocity dropping to 430 m/s (1,400 ft/s) at 25 m (82 ft).

An improved cartridge was introduced in 1879 with a slower burning F3 powder, alterations to the tip of the bullet and a reduction in the height of the patch. In 1884 a bullet was introduced of 5% antimony and 95% lead which was compressed and hardened instead of simply cast, and the tip was flattened to improve accuracy.

During World War I an incendiary round was manufactured to be fired from the cartridge for the balloon busting role.

== History ==
Following their disastrous defeat in the Franco-Prussian War, the French Army instituted a number of broad reforms including the adoption of an updated rifle in 1874, the Fusil Gras mle 1874, that replaced the cloth cartridge of the preceding Fusil Chassepot mle 1866 rifle with a new brass cartridge, the 11×59mmR Gras, France's first modern military cartridge.

In addition to being chambered in their new Fusil Gras mle 1874, the preceding Fusil Chassepot mle 1866 was easily converted to fire the 11×59mmR Gras cartridge by simply modifying the chamber and altering the bolt, known as the Fusil mle 1866/74; this conversion was widely issued alongside the new rifle.

The Remington Rolling Block rifle was also chambered in the 11×59mmR Gras cartridge. The 11×59mmR Gras was used extensively in both the Remington and the Gras rifles by Japan, Chile, Ethiopia, a number of Balkan states, and France's North African colonial possessions. Greece initially chambered their Mylonas rifle in this cartridge but later adopted the Fusil Gras mle 1874 as their standard rifle.

In 1886 it was replaced in French frontline service by the revolutionary 8×50mmR Lebel, the first military cartridge to use smokeless gunpowder. The Lebel cartridge was itself created by necking down the 11×59mmR.

=== World War I service ===
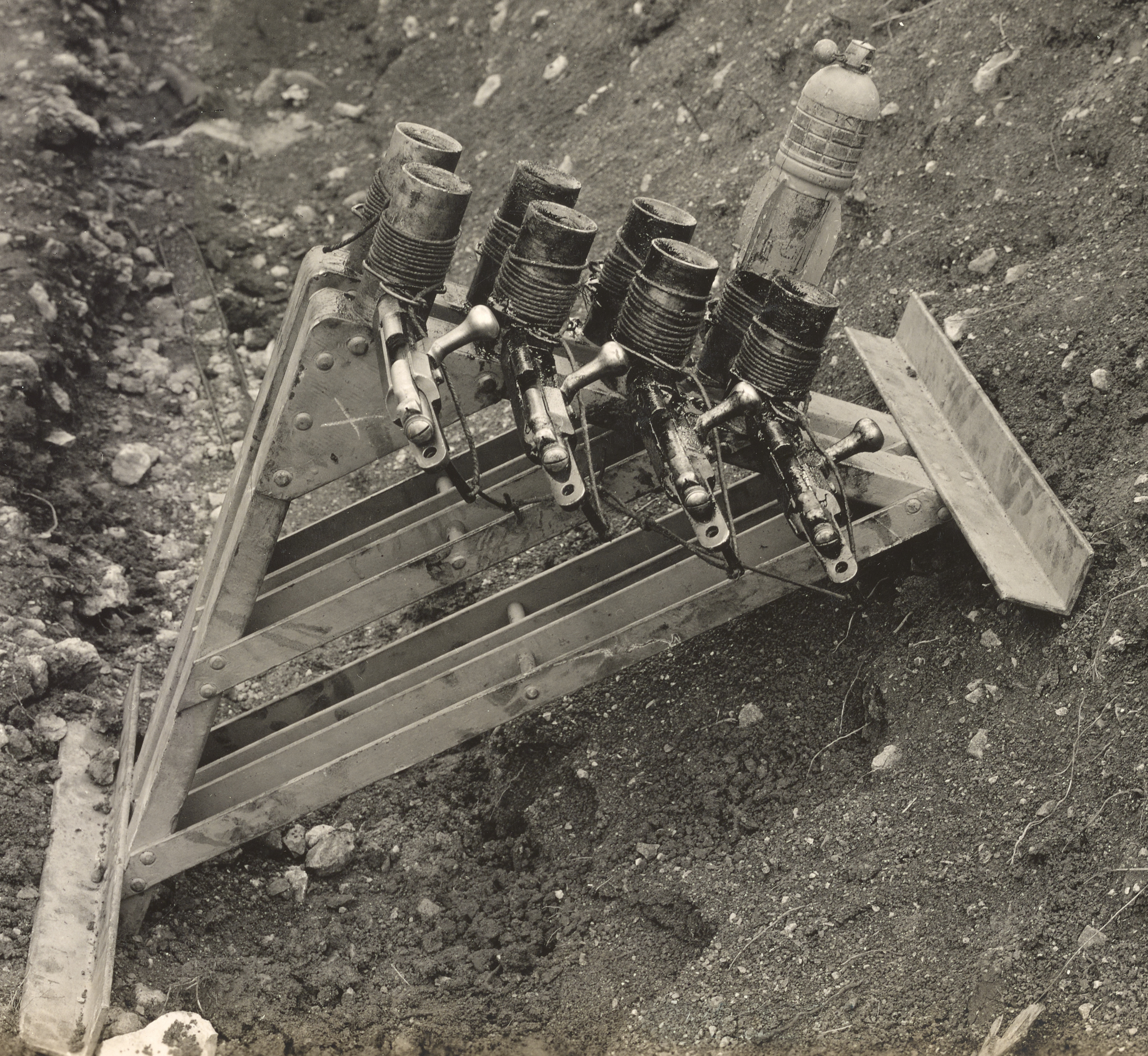
Bombardes DR.

Despite being superseded, the Gras rifle and the 11×59mmR cartridge continued in wide service with territorial and second-line troops as well as throughout France's colonies, continuing in these roles during the Great War. In addition to arming second-line troops, old Gras rifles and the 11×59mmR cartridge were widely used by front-line troops as converted grenade launchers, known as Bombardes DR (grenade throwers) these conversions had cut down barrels and butts of varying workmanship and always fired cartridges with the bullets removed to propel the grenade, and were used as a crude form of trench mortar.

In 1916 it was decided to re-equip the Kingdom of Serbia's Army with French-made weapons, and from October of that year, the Serbian Army received 20,000 Gras rifles along with other French weapons. Due to a chronic shortage of modern rifles within the Imperial Russian Army, 105,000 Gras rifles and a quantity of 11×59mmR cartridges were supplied to Russia during the war, these rifles were subsequently used by the Red Army in their early years.

==== "Balloon buster" ====
By 1917 it had been determined that standard rifle calibre cartridges were less satisfactory for balloon busting (shooting down observation balloons) than larger calibres carrying incendiary or tracer bullets. The French adapted the standard 11×59mmR Gras cartridge to fire from their Hotchkiss M1914 machine gun as an aircraft gun. Later the more reliable and more easily synchronised Vickers machine gun was chambered in the round, known as the Vickers aircraft machine gun and sometimes the "balloon buster", it fired the same cartridge with incendiary bullets and disintegrating belt link, the cartridge became known as the 11mm Vickers in British service. The Vickers aircraft machine gun and the 11mm Vickers was adopted by the allies as a standard anti-balloon armament and used by both the British and French in this role until the end of the war, as well as other allies such as Belgium and the United States of America. Notable users include Belgium's leading fighter ace and the allies' champion balloon buster Willy Coppens, and America's two highest scoring fighter aces, Eddie Rickenbacker and Frank Luke.

=== Post War service ===
Post War the Gras rifle and the 11×59mmR cartridge continued in service with various users, the Italian Army faced a number of Gras rifles in the hands of Ethiopian irregulars during the Second Italo-Ethiopian War of 1936, whilst during World War II the Gras rifle and the 11×59mmR cartridge armed various partisan and guerilla groups throughout the Balkans. In the late 1930s, remaining Mauser-Koka 1884 artillery carbines within the Yugoslav inventory were converted from the 10.15×63mmR Mauser to 11×59mmR Gras cartridges which were in good supply in Yugoslav Army depots. During the Spanish Civil War a number of Republican troops were armed with Gras rifles. The last known official user of the 11×59mmR was Yemen, who continued to use the Gras rifle and cartridge into the 1950s.

== Use ==
=== Military users ===
- Canada
  - Quebec - 1874/80/14 (Mle 1914) Gras variants chambered in 8mm Lebel, and some Mle 1874's and 1874/80's in the original 11×59R were used by the Quebec Home Guard, and Quebec Papal Zouaves. Quebec Home Guard rifles feature the Q.H.G. stamp, while the Papal Zouve Gras rifles are mostly only marked a 3 digit rack number on their stocks, and leather accessories (bayonet frog, sling, belt, cartridge belts etc.)
- Kingdom of Belgium
- Chile
- Ethiopian Empire
- France
- Greece
- Japan
- Kingdom of Montenegro
- Russian Empire
- Kingdom of Serbia
- Kingdom of Serbs, Croats and Slovenes
- Spanish Republic
- Soviet Union
- United Kingdom
- United States
- Yemen

=== Weapons chambering the 11×59mmR ===
- Fusil mle 1866/74
- Fusil Gras mle 1874
- Hotchkiss M1914 machine gun
- Mauser-Koka 1884
- Mylonas rifle
- Remington Rolling Block rifle
- Vickers machine gun

== See also ==
- List of rifle cartridges
- .577/450 Martini-Henry
