= List of Chinese military equipment in World War II =

China, Military WW2

The following is a list of military equipment of the ROC in World War II (1937–1945) which includes aircraft, artillery, small arms, vehicles and vessels. This list covers the equipment of the National Revolutionary Army, various warlords and including the Collaborationist Chinese Army and Manchukuo Imperial Army, as well as Communist guerillas, encompassing the period of the Second United Front.

== Swords and bayonets ==
- Dao
- Miaodao
- HY1935 bayonet
- Qiang (spear)
- Shin guntō (used by pro-Japanese officers)
- Type 30 bayonet (used by pro-Japanese forces)

== Small arms ==
=== Pistols ===
Weapon	Caliber	Notes	Origin
Mauser C96	7.63x25mm.45 ACP	Called the Box Cannon (盒子炮). The most common and popular pistol since the beginning of the Republic. Imported from Germany and Spain (Astra 900 and MM31), but mostly produced locally copy in various arsenals, the larger being in Hanyang, Shanghai, Gongxian, Taku and Shanxi. Often used with a detachable shoulder stock. The pistol used the 7.63x25mm caliber, but a version in .45 ACP was also produced in Shanxi, called the "Type 17"	China; Germany; Spain
FN 1900	.32 ACP	Very popular pistol called the Lu Zi (撸子) or 8 Bangs (八音子) in the North and Bent Ruler (曲尺) in the South. Originally made in Belgium, but with many copies and variations produced in China, most significantly in the arsenals in Jinling and Shanghai. Made with both 6 or 8-inch barrels, the latter having a slot for a detachable shoulder stock.	China; Belgium
Ruby	.32 ACP	Originally made in Spain, but produced copy in China by the Hanyang Arsenal, as well as smaller shops.	China; Spain
Colt M1903	.32 ACP	Imported commercially from the United States. Called the Horse Brand Pistol (馬牌撸子) after the old Colt rampant horse logo.	United States
FN 1910; FN 1910/22	.32 ACP	Imported from Belgium and nicknamed the Floral Mouth Pistol (花口撸子) due to its serrated muzzle ring.	Belgium
Mauser 1914	.32 ACP	Imported from Germany. Called the Kick Mouth Open (张嘴蹬) due to the hold-open design when the gun was empty "waiting" like an "open mouth".	Germany
Astra 400	9mm Largo	Rare pistol imported from Spain and used the uncommon (especially in China) 9 mm Largo caliber.	Spain
Hi-Power	9×19mm	Produced by the John Inglis Company in Canada for China through the Mutual Aid Board in 1943. Originally intended to make 180,000, only 4,000 were delivered to Karachi, India before the end of the war, with supply problems over "the Hump" making it hard for them to reach the Chinese Y Force. Production was cancelled in 1944, but restarted in late 1945, with 40,000 being used in the Civil War after World War II.	Canada
Colt M1911A1	.45 ACP	Supplied to SACO guerrilla units and operatives early in the war, and to the X Force in Burma later on. Nicknamed the Big Eye Pistol (大眼撸子) due to the large caliber.	United States
Colt M1917	.45 ACP	Supplied to SACO guerrilla units and operatives.	United States
S&W Regulation Police	.32 S&W Long	Smith & Wesson revolvers in this caliber, copies of the S&W Regulation Police, was produced in the 44th Arsenal located in Guizhou during slack time, starting 1942, often with a detachable shoulder stock.	China; United States
Nambu Type 14; North China Type 19	8mm Nambu	The Type 14 was captured from the Imperial Japanese Army and nicknamed the Turtle Shell Pistol (王八盒子) or Chicken Thigh Pistol (鸡腿撸子). It was also supplied to Manchukuo and the Collaborationist Chinese Army, who also produced a very small number of the Type 19, a copy of the Type 14.	Japan; China (Nanjing)

=== Submachine guns and automatic pistols ===
Weapon	Caliber	Notes	Origin
Bergmann	7.63x25mm 7.65×21mm	The Bergmann gun was the most common SMG in China at the time and called the Flower Mouth Machine-gun (花机关). SIG in Switzerland produced the originally German weapon under license as the "SIG Bergmann 1920" and exported it to China after World War I. Chinese arsenals in Jinling and Shanghai started producing them in 7.65mm in 1926. Other arsenals, such as Taku and Hanyang, started making them in 7.63mm. Shenyang, Shanxi and Beiyang arsenals also produced copy the weapon. Some arsenals made the weapon with the magazine facing down, instead of to the side.	China; Switzerland
Erma EMP	7.63x25mm	Purchased and copied in small numbers during the Second-Sino Japanese War	ChinaGermany
Thompson	.45 ACP; 7.63x25mm	The M1921 was commercially imported from the United States and thereafter locally produced in China since the 1920s. Several tens of thousands were made copy in the arsenals of Shanxi, Taiyuan and Sichuan. ~4,700 guns were also made in 7.63mm in the 21st Arms Weapons Depot. Later in the war, M1928A1 wartime models were supplied to the X Force in Burma, with some also going to the Y Force, by the United States. The M1 was also supplied to SACO units.	China; United States
Automatic Mauser C96	7.63x25mm	The fully automatic version of the common Mauser C96 was originally invented and imported from Spain (Astra 902, Super Azul and MM31). They were also widely imported from Germany (M712 Schnellfeuer). Chinese-made copies also existed. A Chinese technique of firing the gun was to hold the pistol sideways, as the high recoil due to the very high rate of fire would push the gun in a sweeping motion to the side instead of upwards.	Spain; Germany; China
United Defense M42	9×19mm	Supplied to SACO guerrilla units and operatives.9×19mm	USA
Sten gun	9×19mm	During World War Two, Canada supplied some 73,000 Sten guns (made by the Long Branch arsenal) to Chinese Nationalist forces in an effort to help them fight the Japanese. These Stens were standard MkII pattern guns, chambered for the 9x19mm Parabellum cartridge.	Canada
Grease gun	.45 ACP 9x19mm	Lend-Leased to the National Revolutionary Army, along with the Thompson	USA
PPD-40	7.62x25mm	Received 3,000 during the Second Sino Japanese War.	USSR

=== Rifles ===
Weapon	Caliber	Notes	Origin
Hanyang 88	7.92×57mm	The most common Chinese rifle in the war and was based copy on the German Gewehr 88 originally used by the New Armies of the Qing dynasty (Several Gewehr 88s also found their way to China after World War I and even its predecessor, the Gewehr 71/84, was still in very limited use.). Around 1,000,000 were produced in several Chinese arsenals before production ceased in 1944. There also existed a more uncommon carbine version.	China; Germany
Chiang Kai-Shek rifle Standardmodell; Karabiner 98k	7.92×57mm	In the Chinese National Armament Standards Conference of 1932 it was decided that the Mauser Standardmodell was to be the standard-issue rifle of China. It started being imported from Germany in 1934 and production in Chinese arsenals also began in 1935, first under the name "Type 24 Rifle", but was soon renamed to the "Chiang Kai-Shek rifle" after the Generalissimo. It would remain the standard service rifle throughout the war, but would never outproduce the Hanyang 88, with the total number of Chinese produced Chiang Kai-Shek rifles made between 1935 and 1945 being ~360,000. In 1935, Germany adopted a modified Standardmodell as their service rifle under the designation Karabiner 98k, continued Chinese imports between 1938 and 1939 would consist of some 100,000 examples of this rifle.	China; Germany
FN Model 1924; FN Model 1930	7.92×57mm	After World War I, German arms exports were banned under the Treaty of Versailles, and weapons companies of other countries stepped in to fill the gap. A very large number of Belgian M1924 rifles and M1930 carbines from FN were sold to China. Chinese arsenals also produced copies, such as the "Type 21 Carbine" from Guangdong or the "Type 77 Rifle" (named after the date of the Marco Polo Bridge Incident) from Zhejiang.	Belgium; China
ZB vz. 98/22	7.92×57mm	After World War I, German arms exports were banned under the Treaty of Versailles, and weapons companies of other countries stepped in to fill the gap. Czechoslovak Brno produced and exported a modified version of the German Gewehr 98. Records show around 200,000 were shipped to China between 1927 and 1939.	Czechoslovakia
ZB vz. 24	7.92×57mm	Right after the ZB vz. 98/22, Brno started producing the shorter ZB vz. 24. Around 100,000 were imported by the Central Government of China between 1937 and 1938, and several tens of thousands more by provincial governors.	Czechoslovakia
Mosin–Nagant 1891; Mosin–Nagant 1891/30	7.62×54mmR	Called the Three-Line Repeater (三线步枪), due to the old Russian measurement of the caliber, or Water Repeater (水连珠), believed to be due to Chinese first encountering the rifle from Russian Naval Infantry. Many Mosin-Nagant 1891 rifles were supplied during the Sino-Soviet cooperation in the 1920s and to the troops of the pro-Soviet Sheng Shicai. The Soviet Aid Program early in the war also supplied China with 50,000 Mosin-Nagant 1891/30 rifles, which were used by second line and garrison troops due to the caliber difference.	Soviet Union
Carcano 1891	6.5×52mm	The Carcano rifle was first imported from Italy in 1920, with an order of 40,000. In 1922, a further 14,000 rifles were purchased. In 1924, a further 40,000 rifles were obtained. Japanese records show these rifles being captured in Fujian. In 1941, Japan sold 15,000 of these captured weapons to the collaborationist Nanjing Army.	Italy
M1917 Enfield	.30-06	Common Chinese Lend-Lease rifle. Most of the X Force in Burma were carrying this rifle. At first the rifles were cut-down to a shorter length, to better suit the shorter Chinese soldiers, but later issued rifles were of normal length.	United States
M1903A3 Springfield	.30-06	The M1903A3 Springfield was also commonly issued to soldiers of the X Force. It was also used by Chinese commandos in 1945, provided by the OSS.	United States
M1 Carbine	.30 Carbine	Milton E. Miles of SACO considered the light-weight M1 Carbine to be more suitable to the Chinese soldiers than the bigger Mauser rifles, therefore, most SACO units from 1943 on were issued with this semi-automatic weapon. It was also used by the X Force in Burma.	United States
Lee-Enfield No.4 Mk I*	.303 British	The North American produced version of the Lee-Enfield was issued to the X Force while they were training in India. The rifles were part of the Lend-Lease program and marked as US property. Once American rifles started being issued, the Lee-Enfields were kept as training weapons and for guard duty. 40,000 were supplied from 1942 onward.	Canada; United States
Mauser 1907; Mauser Type 1 Mauser Type 4	6.8×57mm 7.92×57mm	The Type 1 was a Chinese produced version of a pattern of imported German rifle (Mauser 1907) from the end of the Qing dynasty. Originally chambered in 6.8×57mm, but changed to 7.92×57mm with the new designation Type 4 (usually just called the "Type 1 7.9mm"), in 1915. The Type 4 were the older Chinese standard rifles and common during the Warlord era. In World War II, they were outdated, but still in use by more poorly equipped units.	China; Germany
Liao Type 13	7.92×57mm 6.5×50mmSR	A hybrid between Arisaka and Mauser 4 produced in the Japanese puppet state Manchukuo and before in the Mukden Arsenal. Around 140,000 are estimated to have been produced in total. Most of the weapons are using the 7.92×57mm Mauser cartridge, but some have turned up chambered in 6.5×50mmSR Arisaka.	China; Manchukuo
Arisaka Type 30; Arisaka Type 38	6.5×50mmSR	While the Japanese Arisaka rifle was supplied to collaborationist units, particularly the Manchukuo Imperial Army and used as captured weapons by Allied ones, China had also imported and produced (in Shanxi) Type 30 and 38 Rifles since before the war. Up to 1917, ~200,000 Type 38 and 150,000 Type 30 rifles had also been imported. The Type 38 was called 38 Big Cover (三八大盖), by the Chinese. Copies of the Type 30 and 38, in 7.92×57mm and 6.5×50mmSR respectively, both named "Type 19", were also made in the collaborationist China.	Japan; China; China (Nanjing)
Type 81 Short Rifle	7.92×57mm	A short rifle which included a mixture of features from rifles such as the Hanyang 88, vz. 24 and Japanese Arisaka carbine, including a foldable bayonet. They were produced by the Chinese communists, first in the Jin Ji Yu Operating Base Arsenal in September 1940 before prints and templates were distributed to other arsenals. Around 8,700 were made in total and the model was the largest number produced in the communist arsenals during the war.	China
Gewehr 98	7.92×57mm	Some surplus weapons from various countries in possession of the Gewehr 98 after World War I sold these off internationally, with some ending up in the arms of Chinese warlords.	Germany
Karabinek wz. 1929	7.92×57mm	16,450 delivered in 1930 - 1931	Poland
Mannlicher M1886; Mannlicher M1888	8×52mmR	Many were imported very long before World War II, but were still used by some rear-line units.	Austria-Hungary
ZH-29	7.92×57mm	210 examples of this weapon were purchased in 1930 and 1931 for Northeast China. They were probably captured in the Japanese invasion of Manchuria. A derivative prototype was built in 1932 in Shenyang, China. It is unlikely that these rifles saw action during the Sino-Japanese War.	Czechoslovakia China
Murata Type 13	11×60mmR	Local defense militias in Manchukuo were issued obsolete weapons such as these.	Japan
Xiangying rifle	6.5×50mmSR Arisaka	The Xiangying rifle was made by modifying captured Type 38 rifles. Unlike the regular Type 38 rifle, the Xiangying rifle lacked the Arisaka's distinctive dust cover however, it still had a bayonet mount like the Type 38 rifle and was chambered in the same round (6.5×50mmSR Arisaka). The Xiangying rifle is modified with an external gas piston on the right side of the rifle. The gas piston is connected to the base of the bolt handle. It also had a recoil compensator. Only about 4-7 were made.	China

=== Grenades and grenade launchers ===
Weapon	Notes	Origin
Chinese Stielhandgranate	China designed and produced grenades based on the German type, which was the main type during the war. Both several arsenals and civilian workshops produced hundreds of thousands each month. Variations existed, but followed the same basic principle: a wooden handle with a round or cylindrical head and a slow burning fuse. The charge was a mixture of TNT and nitride potassium and were generally weaker than their German counterpart. In 1939, a more powerful design with a smaller handle and much more compressed explosive load became the new standard type in all arsenals. Soldiers often bundled grenades together to blast open fortifications. Another tactic was to tie a grenade to a long bamboo stick, for example to stick up over a wall or into a window.	China; Germany
Various Grenades	Several other types of simple timed or impact grenades were also made in various machine shops. Examples are copies of the Mills bomb and an impact grenade produced in Jinling Arsenal which had a long "tail" made of hemp to make it easier to throw, nicknamed the "Ponytail Grenade". Local production of grenades and mines by Communist soldiers were important to their guerrilla tactics.	China
Type 23 Grenade	The Type 23 Grenade was a simple cast metal grenade adopted in 1934 which had the function to be easily used as a trap. Many of these grenades were also captured by the Japanese and used in the Pacific War, where US reports believed them to be a new Japanese type.	China
Type 27 Grenade Discharger	The Type 27 was a common 50 mm grenade launcher, a simplified version based on the Japanese Type 89 (which proved too complicated to produce and for soldiers to use). The launcher was designed and tested in 1938, with production beginning in January 1939. Some modifications were introduced in 1940 and 1941, such as making the calibration and base plate thicker and changing the shape of the range adjustment wheel. It had a range of 50–250 meters with a kill zone of 20 meters in diameter. The grenade had a delay fuse of 7.5–8 seconds after being launched. The projectile (Type 27 Grenade) were copies of the Japanese Type 91 grenade, which were used with the Type 89. Therefore, captured enemy ammunition could be used as well. 40,900 were produced, with 1,500,000 grenades. The weapon could be carried in a large leather holster.	China; Japan
Type 28 Rifle Grenade	The Type 28 was a rifle grenade launcher shaped like a long cylinder which would be attached to front of a Mauser type or Hanyang 88 rifle. It could then fire a Type 28 Rifle grenade (both explosive and smoke types) with the use of a special blank cartridge. The Type 28 rifle grenade system was designed in February 1939 and adopted the same year, going intro production by June. It had a range of 50–250 meters and had a kill zone 10 meters in diameter. The Type 28 grenade was similar to the regular "Stielhandgranate" types, and could be thrown by hand. It had a fuse of 6.5 seconds and was more powerful than regular grenades. Monthly production was 80,000 grenades and 2,000 launchers.	China

=== Flamethrowers ===
Weapon	Notes	Origin
M1A1 Flamethrower	The X Force and Y Force in Burma and later southern China were supplied with these flamethrowers in 1944 and 1945.	United States

=== Machine guns ===
Weapon	Caliber	Notes	Origin
ZB vz. 26	7.92×57mm	Between 1927 and 1939 Brno exported around 30,000 ZB-26 machine guns to China. Chinese production started in 1927, originally in Taku, but with many other arsenals soon following suit. It was the standard light machine gun since 1934 and the most common through the whole war, with many arsenals each producing several hundred weapons per month. The gun never received its own designation in China, but was always simply referred to as the "Czech Light Machine-gun".	China; Czechoslovakia
FN Model 1930; FN Model D	7.92×57mm	Belgian versions of the Browning Automatic Rifle made by FN were imported to China. Over 9,000 had been imported by the time the war broke out, with an additional 8,000 being purchased after that.	Belgium
Madsen gun	7.92×57mm	The Danish Madsen gun was used with a bipod or tripod and was both imported and locally produced copy in small scale since 1909. The Madsen gun was considered to replace the ZB vz. 26 after Brno had turned down the licensing rights for production in China. But after a full set of tools, jigs and drawings were lost in a Japanese air raid in 1940, the Ordnance Office turned back to ZB vz. 26 production. 438 were imported before the war and 3,300 during it.	Denmark; China
Neuhausen KE-7	7.92×57mm	China purchased over 3,000 KE-7s from Switzerland between 1928 and 1939, including 44,500 magazines. An arsenal in Chongqing, Sichuan produced copy an additional 6,000 copies between 1934 and 1936.	China; Switzerland
Degtyaryov DP	7.62×54mmR	5,600 Soviet Degtyaryov DP machine guns were supplied to China in the Soviet Aid Program starting in 1938.	Soviet Union
Maxim–Tokarev	7.62×54mmR	The predecessor of the Degtyaryov was the Maxim-Tokarev 1925 machine gun. Of the total 2,450 produced, 1,400 were supplied to China between 1938 and 1939, with the rest going to the Republicans in the Spanish Civil War.	Soviet Union
Hotchkiss 1922	7.92×57mm	China started buying this French weapon in 1931 and by the time the war started in 1937 2,620 guns had been imported. A further 1,400 guns were ordered, with at least 925 confirmed deliveries by 1939.	France
Chauchat	7.92*57mm	About 100 copies of the Chauchat were produced by Jinling Arsenal and used during the Second Sino-Japanese War.	France China
Lewis gun	.303 British	At least 3,000 Lewis guns and 15,000,000 rounds of ammunition were purchased around 1930.	United Kingdom
Lahti-Saloranta M/26	7.92×57mm	Originally chambered in the Finnish 7.62×53mmR, the export version of this weapon to its only buyer: China, was chambered in 7.92×57mm Mauser. A contract was originally signed for 30,000 guns, but only 800 were delivered in 1938.	Finland
MG 30	7.92x57mm	Fifty guns bought by a delegation in 1932	Weimar republic
Bren gun	.303 British; 7.92×57mm	Over 18,000 Canadian John Inglis Company Bren Mk. I guns in .303 British were supplied to China through the Lend-Lease program. However, supply problems over "the Hump" led to only 1,117 having been issued to units in China by early 1945. So the primary user became the X Force in Burma, with the Y Force receiving more later on. In October 1943, the John Inglis Company started producing Bren guns in 7.92×57mm Mauser for the Chinese. By the end of World War II, 18,900 had been shipped and 13,800 had been delivered to China by July 1945. Several thousands more would be delivered and used in the Chinese Civil War in the following years.	Canada
Nambu Type 11	6.5×50mmSR	Captured Japanese Type 11 machine guns were used, and they were supplied to the Manchukuo Imperial Army as well as other collaborators. A small number of Chinese copies, the "Type 17" in the same caliber, were produced before the war at Mukden. The Type 11 was nicknamed the "歪把子" after the shape of its buttstock.	Japan; China
Type 24 Maxim	7.92×57mm	Based copy on the commercial version of the German MG 08, the MG 09, the Type 24 was a modified and upgraded standardized version of previous small-scale productions of German Maxim guns. It became the most common heavy machine gun in the war, produced in multiple arsenals. In addition to the regular belt, there existed special drum magazines (as well as tripods and sights) for anti-aircraft use. The Type 24 was one of the latest adopted Maxim type guns in the world and could incorporate a lot of experience and features from previous models from around the world. It was a very well made and feature rich weapon.	China
Type Triple-Ten; M1917 Browning	7.92×57mm.30-06	Type Triple-Ten was a Chinese copy of the M1917 Browning in 7.92×57mm Mauser. Production started on 10 October 1921 (the 10th year of the republic), i.e. 10–10–10, and the weapon was thus named "Type Triple-Ten". The gun was not very stable and had poor performance, attempts to obtain drawings from the United States or Belgium to improve it were without success. Production shifted to the Type 24 Maxim instead, but ~10,000 Triple-Tens were still made in total. Later in the war, real M1917 Brownings would be supplied to the X Force, chambered in .30-06.	China; United States
MG-34	7.92*57mm	Even Chinese copy used	GermanyChina
Hotchkiss 1914	7.92×57mm	Around 2,800 guns were imported from France in the 1930s, all in 7.92×57mm Mauser, further deliveries were stopped due to the German invasion of France in 1940. It was a common model during the war.	France
Maxim 1910	7.62×54mmR	The Soviet Aid Program supplied China with 1,300 Maxim guns with wheeled "Sokolov" mounts.	Soviet Union
ZB vz. 37	7.92×57mm	1,000 machine guns of this type was ordered from Czechoslovakia in 1937, 850 arrived between 1938 and 1939, before the German annexation.	Czechoslovakia
M1919 Browning	.30-06	M1919A4 Browning guns were used by the X Force and M1919A6 Brownings were later supplied by the OSS to American trained Chinese commandos in 1945.	United States
Type 3 machine gun	6.5×50mmSR	This machine gun was used by the Manchukuo Imperial Army and by Collaborationist Chinese Armies.	Japan
M2 Browning	.50 BMG		United States

=== Infantry held Anti-tank weapons ===
Weapon	Caliber	Notes	Origin
Boys AT rifle Mk. I*	.55 Boys	Canadian Boys anti-tank rifles were used by the Y Force in 1944 and 1945.	Canada
M1A1 Bazooka	M6A1 HEAT Rocket	The 60 mm M1A1 "Bazooka" rocket launcher was first supplied to SACO units in 1943, they were then supplied to the X Force and Y Force in 1944–1945. A total of ~1,000 Bazookas were in Chinese hands by the end of the war.	United States

=== Vehicle, aircraft and anti-air machine guns ===
- Vickers .50 Type-D
- Hotchkiss M1929 machine gun both single- and twin-barrel versions
- Type 92 aircraft gun (captured)
- Type 89 Lewis aircraft gun (captured)?
- Breda-SAFAT light machinegun M1926(used on L3/33 and L3/35)
- Degtyarev M-1928 (DT and DA versions)
- Maxim PV-1 aircraft gun
- Vickers Class "E" aircraft machine gun (70)
- Vickers Class "F" aircraft machine gun (9)
- Colt–Browning MG40 aircraft machine gun (1038 delivered)
- FN Browning Modèle 1932 aircraft machine gun
- Browning M-2 fixed and flexible aircraft machine gun (460 delivered)
- MG-13 light machine gun (for German armored vehicles, 100 delivered)
- Solothurn Model T-6-220 aircraft machine gun (captured Japanese copies)
- Browning M-1919A5 armor machine gun (1640 delivered)

== Artillery ==
=== Infantry mortars ===
Country	Caliber	Weapon name	Observation	References
France	37mm	MAM Guerilla mortar		
China	41mm-50mm	Various locally built light mortars		
Japan	50mm	Type 10 grenade discharger	captured from Japanese	
Japan	50mm	Type 89 grenade discharger	captured from Japanese	
France	60mm	Brandt Mle 1935		
United States	60mm	M2 mortar	from 1942 onward, local copy with longer barrel produced as Type 31	
China	75mm	Hanyang Arsenal mortar		
China	75mm	Taiyuan Arsenal mortar		
China	75mm	Type 15 mortar	Produced at Hanyang Arsenal	
China	79mm	82mm mortar [sic]	Stokes-type mortar, produced at Shandong arsenal	
China	80mm	Type 11 mortar	Produced at Shenyang arsenal	
France	81 mm	Brandt Mle 27/31	French and Austrian versions	
United States	81mm	M1 mortar	from 1942	
China	82mm	Type 13 and Type 15 trench mortars	Produced at Shenyang arsenal	
China	82mm	Taiyuan Arsenal mortar		
China	82mm	Jiangnan arsenal mortar		
China	82mm	Type 20 mortar	copy of the 81 mm Brandt mortar produced at Jinling arsenal	
China	84mm	Hanyang Arsenal mortar	produced from 1925	
Japan	90mm	Type 94 Infantry Mortar	few captured from Japanese	
Japan	90mm	Type 97 Infantry Mortar	some captured from Japanese	
United States	107 mm	M2 4.2 inch mortar	received from US from 1943 onward	
China	150mm	Type 29 mortar		
United Kingdom	152.4mm	Newton 6-inch Mortar	used by some local warlords	
China	240mm	Infantry mortar	likely single unique unit to fire captured Japanese ammunition	

=== Field and mountain artillery ===
Country	Weapon name	Observation	References
Japan	Type 11 37 mm infantry gun	supplied to pro-Japanese forces or captured	
Italy	Cannone da 47/32 M35		
China	53mm Gelusen	legacy Hotchkiss gun	
China	57mm Gelusen Guo		
China	57mm Lu		
China	70mm Gai Liang	copy of Japanese Type 92 Battalion Gun or 37/70mm Skoda gun?	
France	Canon de 75 modèle 1897	limited service	
Germany	7.5 cm Krupp L/29	actually a L/30 gun	
Japan	75 mm Type 38 field gun	supplied to pro-Japanese forces	
Japan	Type 41 75 mm mountain gun	supplied to pro-Japanese forces	
Austria-Hungary	7.5 cm Model 1911 field gun		
Italy	75 mm M1911 field gun		
Austria-Hungary	7.5 cm Krupp Model 1913 mountain gun		
Germany	7.5 cm Model 1914 mountain gun		
China	75mm Type 13 Liao	copy of the Japanese Type 38 75 mm field gun	
China	75mm Type 18 Liao		
China	75mm Type 12 Jin or Type 12 infantry gun	copy of Krupp 7.5 cm Mountain Gun Model 1904, developed for warlord Yan Xishan	
China	75mm Type 13, Type 14 and Type 17	copies of the Japanese Type 41 75 mm mountain gun	
China	75mm Type 46 Jin	copy of Type 94 75 mm Mountain Gun	
Sweden	Bofors 75 mm Mountain Gun	bought in large quantities	
United States	75 mm Pack Howitzer M1	supplied during Burma campaign	
Soviet Union	76 mm divisional gun M1902/30		
Germany	7.7 cm FK 16	limited service	
China	77mm Type 14 Liao	copy of 8 cm FK M 18	
China	Type 41 77.7mm Field Gun	Produced in China	
United Kingdom	QF 18-pounder gun Mk IV and Mk V	limited service	
China	88mm Type 18 Jin	copy of Gruson 9 cm C/1873 Kanone)	
China	88mm Type 18 Liao	copy of 9 cm L/31 Rheinmetall-Solothurn gun-howitzer	
Austria-Hungary	10.4 cm M.14 field gun		
China	Type 14 10 cm Howitzer	(105 mm) – developed for warlord Yan Xishan	
China	Type 14 10 cm Cannon	(105 mm) Chinese design developed for warlord Yan Xishan, unrelated to Japanese Type 14 10 cm Cannon of accidentally the same name	
China	105mm Type 16 Jin	drilled-out version?	
United States	105 mm M2A1 howitzer		
United Kingdom	114 mm QF 4.5-inch howitzer	captured in Singapore and supplied to pro-Japanese forces	
China	Type 14 12 cm Howitzer	developed for warlord Yan Xishan, design related to Japanese Type 38 12 cm Howitzer	
Soviet Union	122 mm gun M1931 (A-19)		
Soviet Union	122 mm gun M1931/37 (A-19)		
Germany	10.5 cm leFH 18		
Germany	15 cm sFH 18 L/32		

=== Fortress, naval and coastal guns ===
Country	Weapon name	Observation	References
Germany	15 cm SK C/28	8 coastal guns supplied in 1936–1937	
Germany	8.8 cm SK C/30 naval gun	dual AA and coastal gun	

=== Anti-tank guns ===
Country	Weapon name	Observation	References
Denmark	20 mm Madsen F5 anti-tank gun		
Germany; Soviet Union	37 mm Grusonwerk and Rosenberg	1890s guns modified as anti-tank gun, received from the Soviet Union	
Germany	Pak 36	including Pak 36 (L/45) and Rheinmetal Commercial (L/50)	
Soviet Union	37 mm anti-tank gun M1930 (1-K)	Russian copy of Pak 36, small amount provided by USSR	
China	Type 30 anti-tank gun	Chinese copy of Pak 36	
Japan	Type 94 37 mm Anti-Tank Gun	captured from Japanese, common	
United States	37 mm Gun M3	supplied by US through Lend-Lease	
Soviet Union	45 mm anti-tank gun M1932 (19-K)	unknown quantity supplied by USSR	
Soviet Union	45 mm anti-tank gun M1937 (53-K)	unknown quantity supplied by USSR	
Italy	Cannone da 47/32 M35	few received from Italy	
Japan	Type 1 47 mm Anti-Tank Gun	few captured from Japanese	

== Anti-aircraft weapons ==
The Chinese did not produce AA guns on their own, but used every foreign gun they could put their hands on. Madsen 20 mm cannons were especially widespread.

Country	Weapon name	Observation	Operator	References
Sweden	Bofors 75 mm Model 1929	28 delivered in 1937	Nationalist China	
Denmark	Madsen 20 mm anti-aircraft cannon		Nationalist China	
Italy	Breda Model 33		Nationalist China	
Germany	Solothurn ST-5	120 delivered in 1937	Nationalist China	
France	25 mm Hotchkiss anti-aircraft gun		Nationalist China	
Germany	3.7 cm Flak 18	60 delivered in 1937	Nationalist China	
Japan	75 mm Type 88 AA gun	supplied to pro-Japanese forces	Chinese Collaborationist	

== Vehicles ==
=== Tankettes ===
- V-C-L Tankette Mk VI (24 were bought and delivered from the United Kingdom between 1929 and 1930)
- Renault UE (10 were bought and delivered from France between 1936 and 1937)
- CV-35 (101 were bought and delivered from Italy between 1937 and 1938)
- Type 94 tankette (18 were supplied to the Collaborationist Chinese Army in 1941)
- Universal Carrier (1,100 in the machine gun version and 400 with 3-inch mortar to the X Force in the Burma Campaign in 1943, but only used for training and never saw combat)

=== Tanks ===
- Renault FT (36 in total are reported, with 14 being bought between 1924 and 1925 and the rest having been captured by Zhang Zuolin after France withdrew from the Russian Civil War in 1920)
- V-C-L Light Amphibious Tank (29 were bought and delivered from the United Kingdom between 1933 and 1935)
- Vickers Mark E Type B (20 were bought and delivered from the United Kingdom between 1934 and 1936)
- Panzer I (15 were bought and delivered from Germany between 1936 and 1937)
- Renault ZB (16 were bought and delivered from France between 1936 and 1940)
- T-26 (82 were supplied in the Soviet Aid Program in 1938)
- BT-5 (4 were supplied in the Soviet Aid Program in 1938)
- M3 Stuart (536 shipped as part of US Lend-Lease, but only 100 used in the Burma Campaign by the X Force between 1943 and 1945)
- M4A4 Sherman (466 provided by the United Kingdom to the X Force in the Burma Campaign in 1944)
- M10 GMC Type 91 (plenty of demilitarized American M10 self-propelled guns rearmed with Japanese Type 91 105 mm howitzer)
- LVT(A)4 (supplied by the US to the Republic of China, captured by communists, fit with Soviet 57 mm ZiS-2 and 76,2 mm ZiS-3)

=== Armored cars ===
- Leichter Panzerspähwagen (15 in total between 1936 and 1937, mostly Sd.Kfz. 222, two Sd.Kfz. 221 and at least one Sd.Kfz 260)
- M3A1 White Scout (36 were supplied in the American Lend-Lease program in 1941, and 104 more from 1942 onwards)
- BA-10 (the odd captured example given to Manchukuo), BA-3/6 and BA-27 (purchased by the KMT)
- Shanghai Arsenal Armored Car (Kuonmintang's own armored cars, four models built in 1929, two models built in 1930)

== Navy ships and war vessels ==
- Chinese cruiser Ning Hai
- Chinese cruiser Ping Hai
- Chinese cruiser Chao Ho
- Chinese cruiser Ying Swei
- Chinese cruiser Yat Sen (later in war has become a Japanese training ship "Atada")
- Hai Chou – former British sloop
- Minelayer Huying
- Gunboats
  - Yi Sheng
  - Hsien Ning
  - Chung Ning
  - Sui Ning
  - Chung Shan (warship) (Capt Sa Shih Chun)**
  - Chu Tung
  - Yung Sheng
  - Chu Chien
  - Hu Fu
  - Chu Kuan
  - Yung Chi
  - Chiang Yuan
  - Yin Ning (Capt Yen Chuan Ching)
  - Hai Ning
  - 7 more unknown gunboats
- Unknown boat class
  - Chung Shan
  - Chaing Chen
  - Min Sheng
- List of ships of the Second World War

== Aircraft ==
- 1st AFAMF XP-1, indigenous experimental fighter
- Aichi AB-3 – 1 bought from Japan and 1 copy built in China
- Chu XP-0 – prototype only
- Breda Ba.27 – imported from Italy
- Fiat CR.32 – imported from Italy
- Breguet 27 – 6 imported from France
- Gloster Gladiator
- Henschel Hs 123 – 12 bought from Germany
- I-15bis – 29
- I-152 – 252? (may be aka I-15bis)
- Polikarpov I-153 – 75
- I-16 Model 5 – 100+?
- I-16 Model 10 – 132
- I-16 Model 17 – 10
- SB-2M-100A – 179
- SB-2M-103 – 100
- DB-3 – 24
- TB-3 – 6
- Tupolev SB – 13
- Yakovlev UT-1 trainer – 13
- A-12 Shrike
- Northrop A-17
- Vultee A-19
- A-29 Hudson
- Martin B-10
- C-19 Alpha
- Beechcraft Staggerwing C-43
- Beechcraft Model 17 Staggerwing D-17 medevac (10 received)
- Beechcraft Model 18 C-45
- Curtiss C-46 Commando
- Northrop Gamma 2E
- Curtiss BF2C Goshawk (aka Curtiss Hawk III – Models 67 and 68)
- Curtiss F11C Goshawk (aka Hawk II)
- Curtiss-Wright CW-21 – 6 flown, 27 kits not built
- Boeing P-12
- Boeing P-26 Peashooter (aka Model 281) – 11 bought from USA
- Curtiss P-36 Hawk – license production as Hawk 75A-5 and Mohawk IV (8 completed)
- Lockheed P-38 Lightning
- Curtiss P-40 Warhawk
- Republic P-43 Lancer
- Republic P-47 Thunderbolt
- North American P-51 Mustang
- Vultee P-66 Vanguard
- North American T-6 Texan trainer (20 received)
- Beechcraft Model 18, trainer modification AT-7 (8 received)
- Cessna AT-17 Bobcat trainer (15 received)
- Boeing-Stearman Model 75, trainer modification PT-17 (150 received)
- Fairchild PT-19 trainer (127 received)
- Ryan PT-22 Recruit trainer (70 received)
- Vultee BT-13 Valiant trainer (30 received)

== See also ==
- List of equipment used in World War II
- List of common World War II infantry weapons
- List of secondary and special issue World War II infantry weapons
- List of Chinese civil and military/warlord aircraft from before 1937
- Air Warfare of WWII from the Sino-Japanese War perspective
