= 7.5 cm GebirgsKanone 06 =

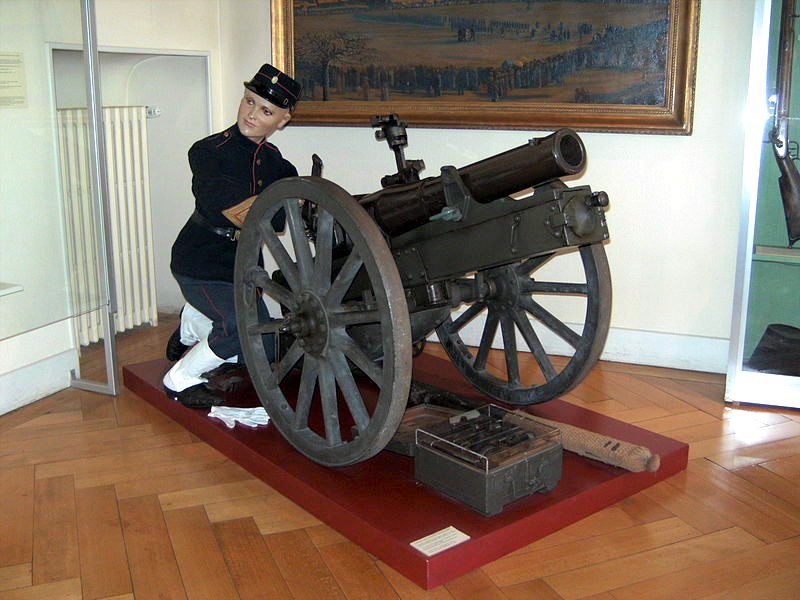
- A Swiss 7.5 cm GebirgsKanone 06 in a museum at Vevey.
- Type: Mountain gun
- Place of origin: German Empire

Production history
- Designer: Krupp
- Designed: 1900
- Manufacturer: Krupp

Specifications
- Mass: 421 kg (928 lb)
- Length: 1.8 m (5 ft 11 in)
- Barrel length: 1.05 m (3 ft 5 in) L/14
- Width: 74 cm (2 ft 5 in)
- Height: 66 cm (2 ft 2 in)
- Crew: 9
- Shell: Separate loading cased charges and projectile
- Shell weight: 5.3 kg (12 lb)
- Caliber: 75 mm (3 in)
- Breech: Horizontal sliding-wedge breech
- Recoil: Hydro-spring
- Carriage: Box trail
- Elevation: -10° to +25°
- Traverse: 4°
- Rate of fire: 6 rpm
- Muzzle velocity: 300 m/s (980 ft/s)
- Maximum firing range: 4.7 km (2.9 mi)

The 7.5 cm GebirgsKanone 06 was a mountain gun built by Krupp that was used by several countries during the 1900s.

== Background ==
During the late 19th century, Krupp became a major arms supplier and one of their better-selling product lines was mountain guns and Krupp sold 688 mountain guns to its customers before World War I. Many of its customers had mountainous borders which were sometimes ill-defined and often were in dispute.

The problem that Krupp's engineers had to solve was there was often a lack of roads and rail lines in mountainous regions and only narrow rocky footpaths existed. The field artillery of the time was designed to be towed by horse teams over gravel roads and then manhandled into firing position. Which was hard enough to do on flat muddy ground but became even more difficult when there was a lack of roads. Traditional field artillery could usually be broken down into separate wagon loads with the barrel on one wagon towed by a horse team while a second horse team towed the carriage. However, there was the issue of the gun crew being unable to reassemble the guns due to a lack of oxygen, cold temperatures, and weighed down with thick clothing.

What was needed was a gun that was light and could be broken down into multiple loads for transport by the gun crew and pack animals. Horses could carry more weight but were large and not always sure-footed. Mules were smaller, sure-footed, but were stubborn and carried less weight. After experimentation, it was found that if a gun could be broken down into multiple loads a mule was capable of carrying a 100 kg (220 lb) load and the gun crews were able to reassemble and manhandle the guns into position.

However, the trade-off was mountain guns didn't stand up well to being towed when assembled due to their jointed designs. Also to keep weight down the guns were often small caliber with reduced propellant loads to reduce recoil and lacked range because their barrels were short to keep them light and portable.

== Design ==
The 7.5 cm GebirgsKanone 06 was a breech-loaded mountain gun built from steel with a box trail carriage, and two wooden-spoked steel-rimmed wheels. It also had a hydro-spring recoil mechanism, horizontal sliding-wedge breech, optional gun shield, and it fired separate loading cased charges and projectiles. It was the first Krupp mountain gun to have a recoil mechanism and its predecessor the 7.5 cm Gebirgskanone L/13 C/80 did not have one. For transport, the gun could be dismantled into four mule loads or towed when assembled. Since the gun was short the barrel sat on a dual-height cradle that gave -10° to +15° of elevation in its low setting and -10° to +25° in its high setting. Due to its limited elevation, it was a direct fire weapon meant to fire on troops in the open and the most common shell types were high-explosive, and shrapnel.

== Users and conflicts ==
- Bulgaria - Bulgaria bought 56 guns and captured another 11 Turkish guns during the Balkan Wars. These were also used during World War I. In Bulgarian service they were known as 75-мм скорострелно планинско оръдие “Круп”.
- Republic of China - Nationalist Chinese forces used them during the Warlord Era, Second Sino-Japanese War, World War II, and Chinese Civil War. The Chinese also built variants of the Type 41 mountain gun that was a Krupp M1908 built under license in Japan. The M1908 mixed Krupp features with a tubular pole trail similar to the type used by the Ehrhardt 7.5 cm Model 1904. An advantage of the M1908 was its tuning fork shaped carriage allowed higher angles of elevation.
- Ottoman Empire - The Ottoman Empire bought 146 guns and these may have been used during the Italo-Turkish War, as well as the Balkan Wars, and World War I. In Ottoman service, they were known as 7,5/14 sm. Krup seri ateşli dağ top.
- Paraguay - On the eve of the Chaco War, Paraguay had 6 of these guns in working condition.
- Serbia - Serbia operated an unknown number of captured guns on the Macedonian front during World War I. They could fire the same ammunition as the Schneider-Danglis 06/09 but had to use a different firing table because the two projectiles had different ballistics.
- Switzerland - Switzerland operated 54 guns until replaced by the Bofors 75 mm Model 1934 during the 1940s. The surviving guns were then used in Swiss fortifications until retired.

== Gallery ==
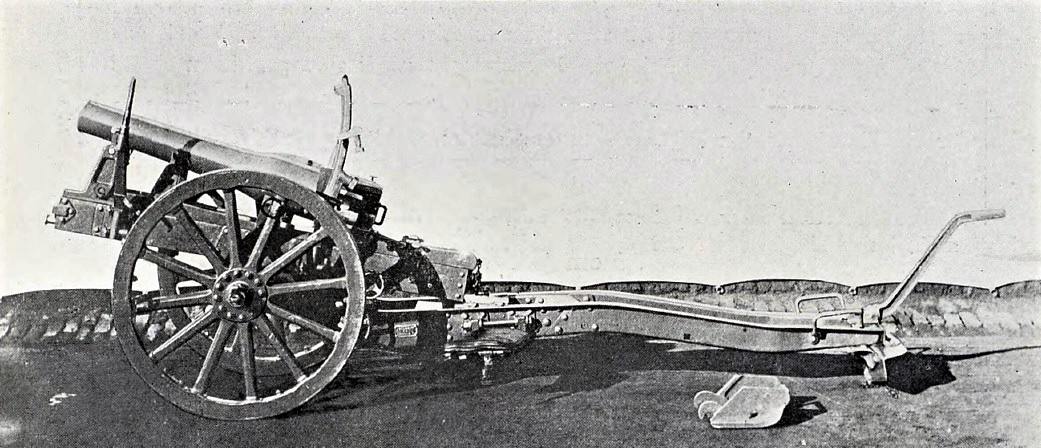
A side view of a GebirgsKanone 06 with barrel elevated.

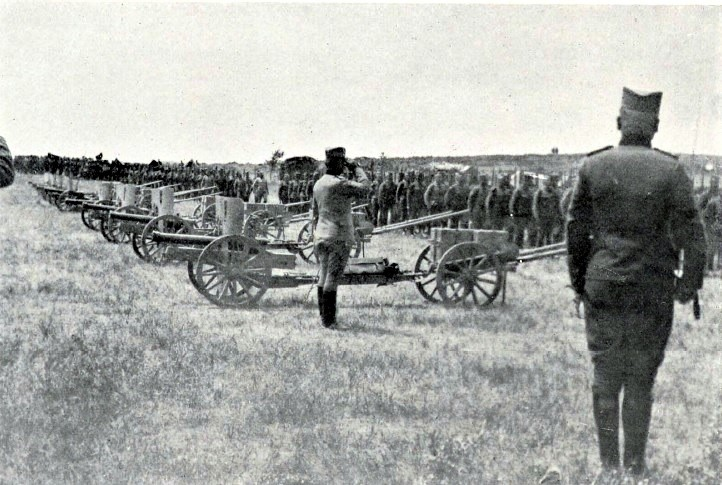
GebirgsKanone 06 guns captured by the French being delivered to Serb artillerymen.

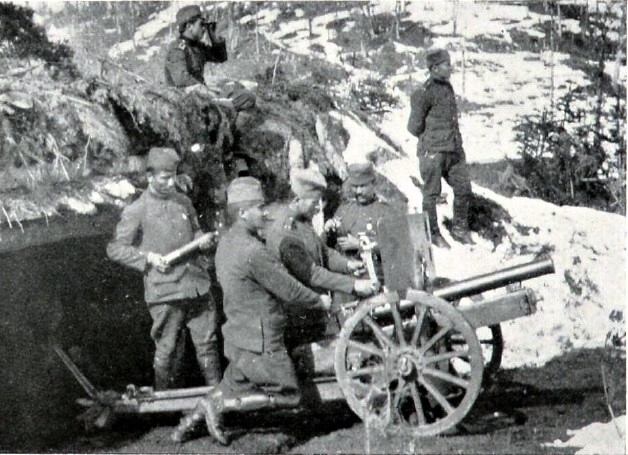
GebirgsKanone 06 in use with Serbian troops.

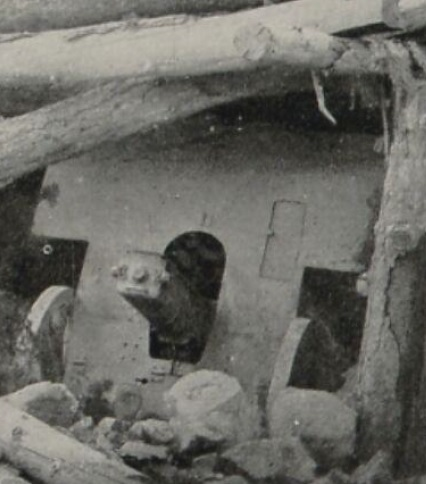
A damaged Bulgarian GebirgsKanone 06.

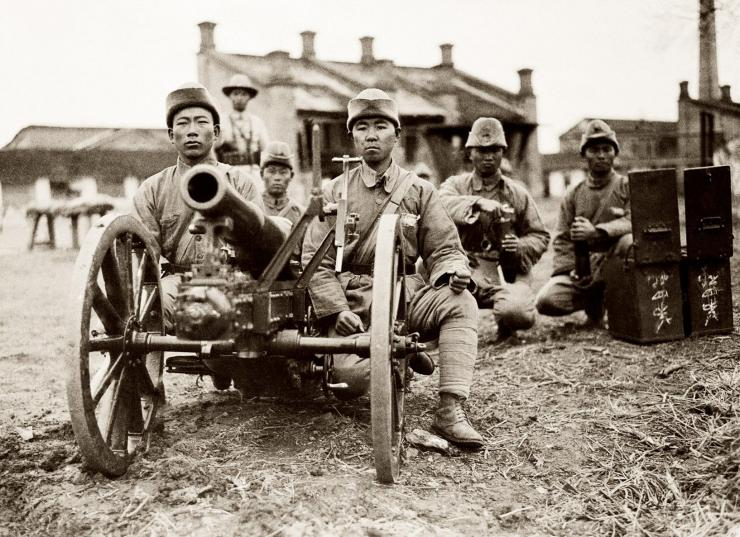
A GebirgsKanone 06 in use with the Fengtian clique.

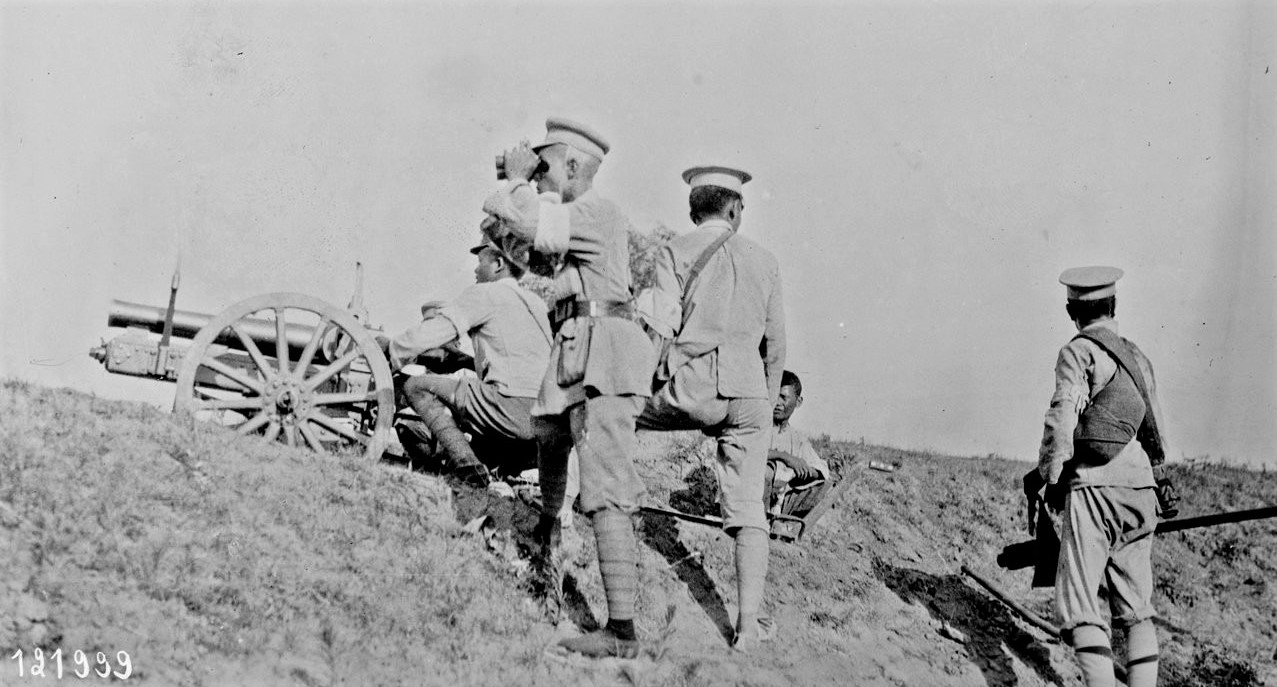
A GebirgsKanone 06 in Nationalist Chinese service during the Second Sino-Japanese War.

Swiss gunners with 06s.
