= 7.5 cm GebirgsKanone 13 =

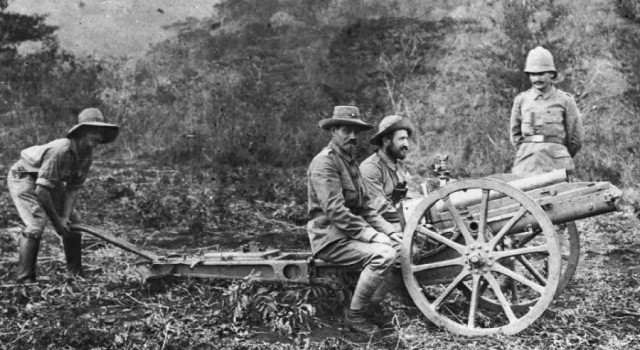
- A 7.5 cm GebirgsKanone 13 of the Schutztruppe in East Africa during World War I.
- Type: Mountain gun
- Place of origin: German Empire

Service history
- Used by: German Empire; Chile; Ottoman Empire; Romania
- Wars: World War I

Production history
- Designer: Krupp
- Manufacturer: Krupp

Specifications
- Mass: Firing: 550 kg (1,210 lb); Travel: 1,010 kg (2,230 lb)
- Barrel length: 1.05 m (3 ft 5 in) L/14
- Shell: Fixed quick-fire projectile
- Shell weight: 5.3 kg (12 lb)
- Caliber: 75 mm (3 in)
- Breech: Horizontal sliding-wedge
- Recoil: Hydro-pneumatic
- Carriage: Box trail
- Elevation: -10° to +30°
- Traverse: 5°
- Rate of fire: 15 rpm
- Muzzle velocity: 300 m/s (980 ft/s)
- Maximum firing range: 5.4 km (3.4 mi)

The 7.5 cm GebirgsKanone 13 or 7.5 cm GebK 13 was a mountain gun used by Germany and the Ottoman Empire during World War I.

== Background ==
During the late 1800s, Krupp became a major arms supplier and one of their better-selling product lines was mountain guns and Krupp sold 688 mountain guns to its customers before World War I. Many of its customers had mountainous borders which were sometimes ill-defined and often were in dispute.

The problem that Krupp's engineers had to solve was there was often a lack of roads and rail lines in mountainous regions and only narrow rocky footpaths existed. The field artillery of the time was designed to be towed by horse teams over gravel roads and then manhandled into firing position. Which was hard enough to do on flat muddy ground but became even more difficult when there was a lack of roads. Traditional field artillery could usually be broken down into separate wagon loads with the barrel on one wagon towed by a horse team while a second horse team towed the carriage. However, there was the issue of the gun crew being unable to reassemble the guns due to a lack of oxygen, cold temperatures, and weighed down with thick clothing.

What was needed was a gun that was light and could be broken down into multiple loads for transport by the gun crew and pack animals. Horses could carry more weight but were large and not always sure-footed. Mules were smaller, sure-footed, but were stubborn and carried less weight. After experimentation it was found that if a gun could be broken down into multiple loads a mule was capable of carrying a 100 kg (220 lb) load and the gun crews were able to reassemble and manhandle the guns into position.

However, the trade-off was mountain guns didn't stand up well to being towed when assembled due to their jointed designs. Also to keep weight down the guns were often small caliber with reduced propellant loads to reduce recoil and lacked range because their barrels were short to keep them light and portable.

== Design ==
The 7.5 cm GebirgsKanone 13 was a breech-loaded howitzer made of steel with a Krupp horizontal sliding-wedge breech and used Fixed quick-fire ammunition. It had a box trail carriage, gun shield, two wooden-spoked steel-rimmed wheels, and a hydro-pneumatic recoil mechanism. For transport, the gun could be dismantled into eight mule loads or hooked to a limber and caisson for towing by a horse team when assembled.

== World War I ==
Before World War I Germany lacked dedicated mountain artillery units despite Krupp and Rheinmetall producing guns for export. The exception was Germany's Schutztruppe in their African Colonies who found Rheinmetall mountain guns useful because of their ability to be broken down into pack loads due to a lack of roads. When World War I broke out Krupp had 4 undelivered guns that were ordered by Chile and these were confiscated by the German Army and tested during the winter of 1914/1915. Another 72 guns were ordered which was enough to equip 9 batteries of 4 guns. In 1916 two guns were delivered by the SS Marie to Schutztruppe in East Africa. In service, they were judged to be inferior to Škoda mountain guns so they were discarded and an unknown number were supplied to Turkey. Romania got 16 pieces in 1913, 8 of them remained in service by the beginning of 1918.

== Surviving guns ==
- One 7.5 cm GebirgsKanone 13 without shield at the National Military Museum, Bucharest, Romania.
- One 7.5 cm GebirgsKanone 13 with shield at Corrigin, Western Australia. The placard says the gun was captured from Ottoman forces.

== Gallery ==
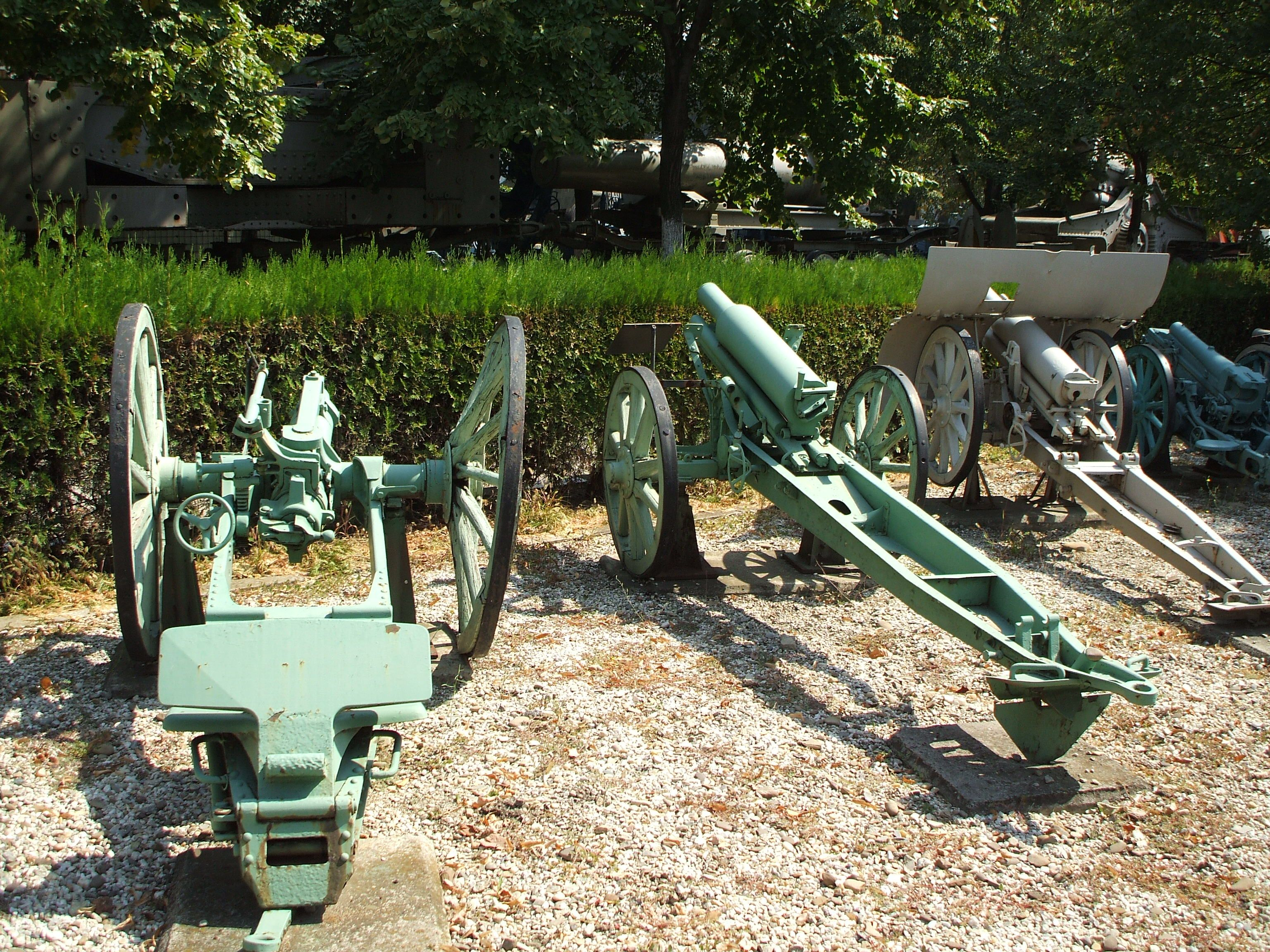
Mountain guns at the National Military Museum, Romania. Russian 76.2 mm mountain gun M1904 left. Two Russian 76.2 mm mountain guns M1909 center. The 7.5 cm GebirgsKanone 13 is at far right.

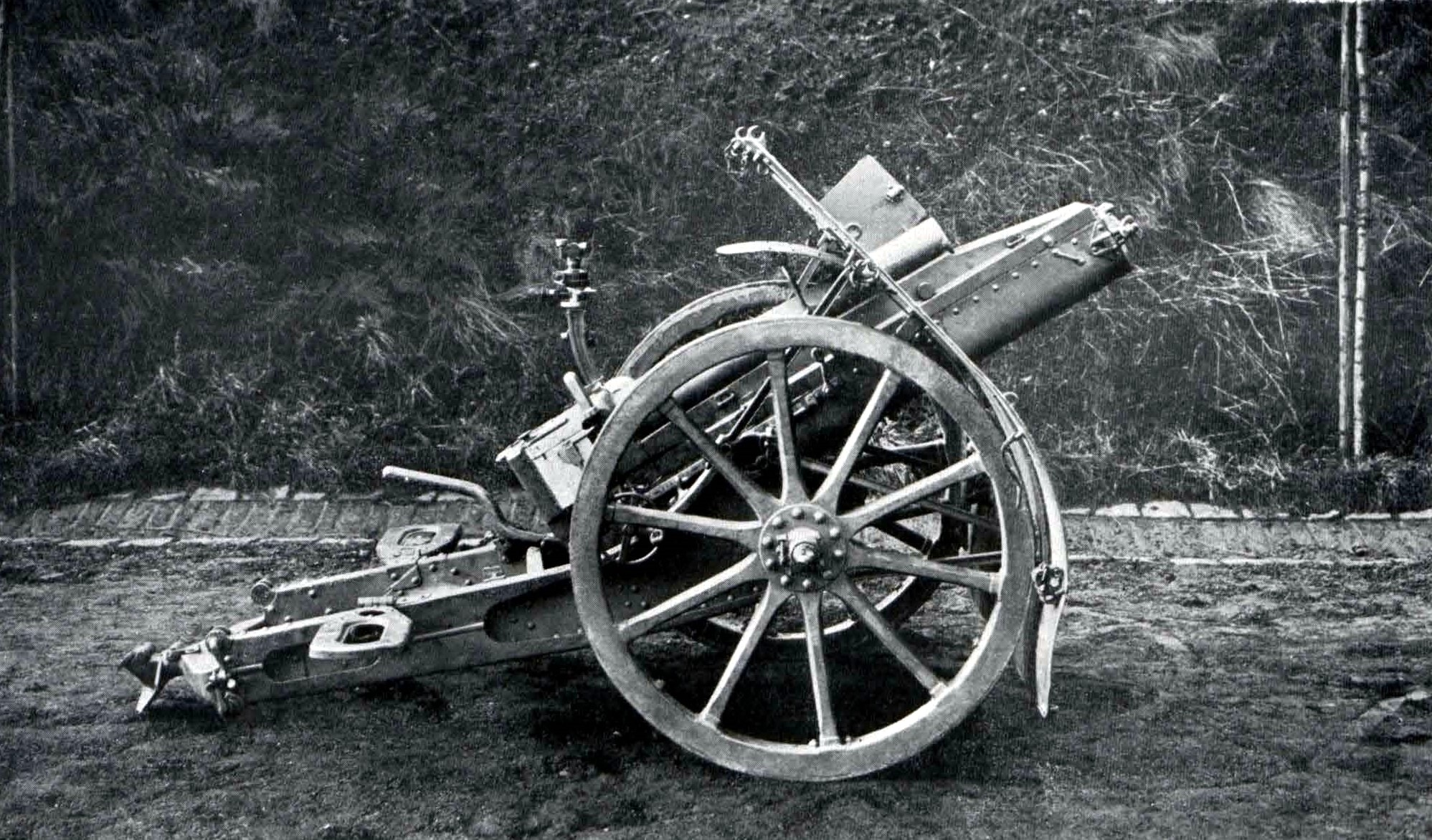
A partially assembled GebirgsKanone at maximum elevation.

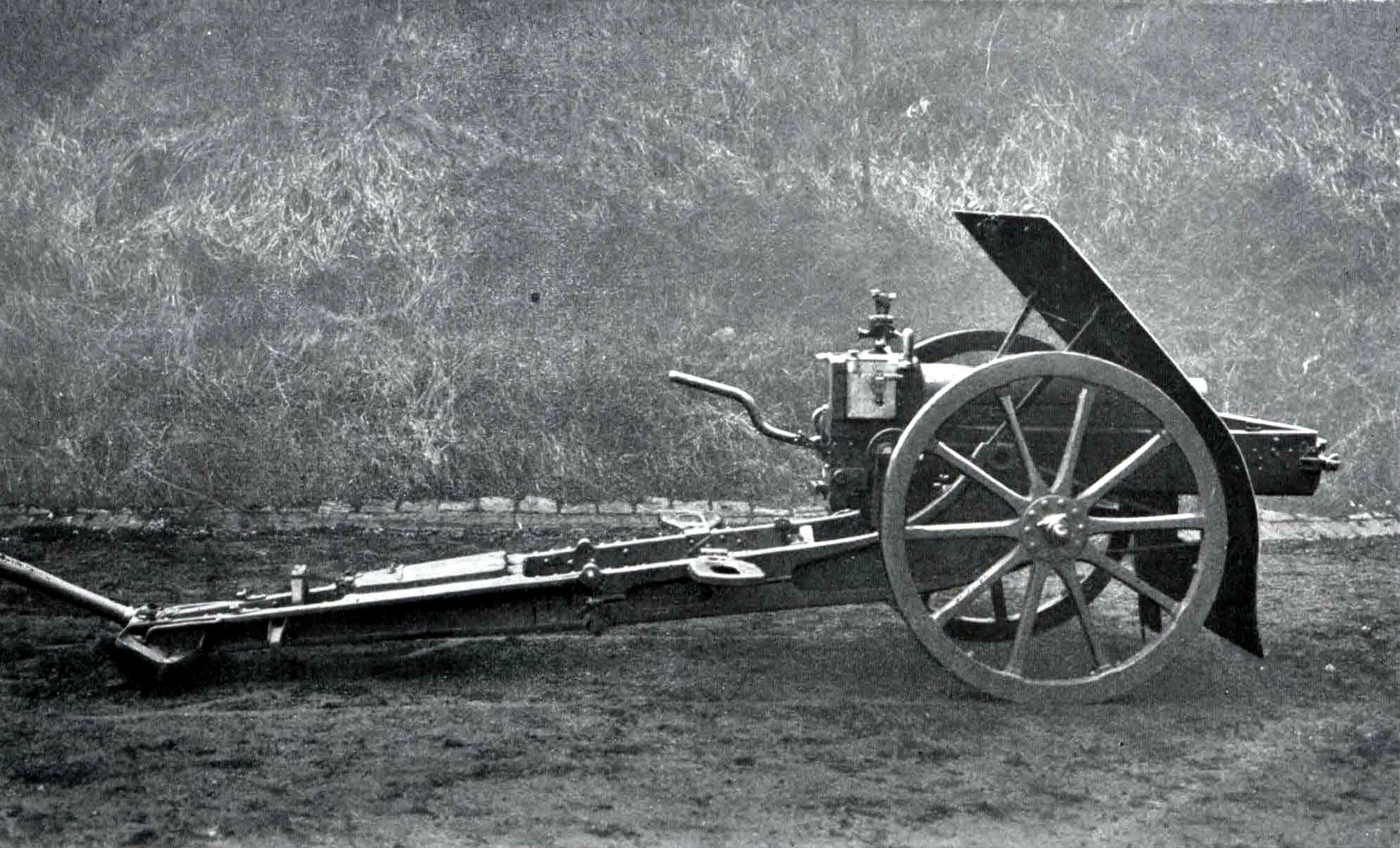
An assembled GebirgsKanone.

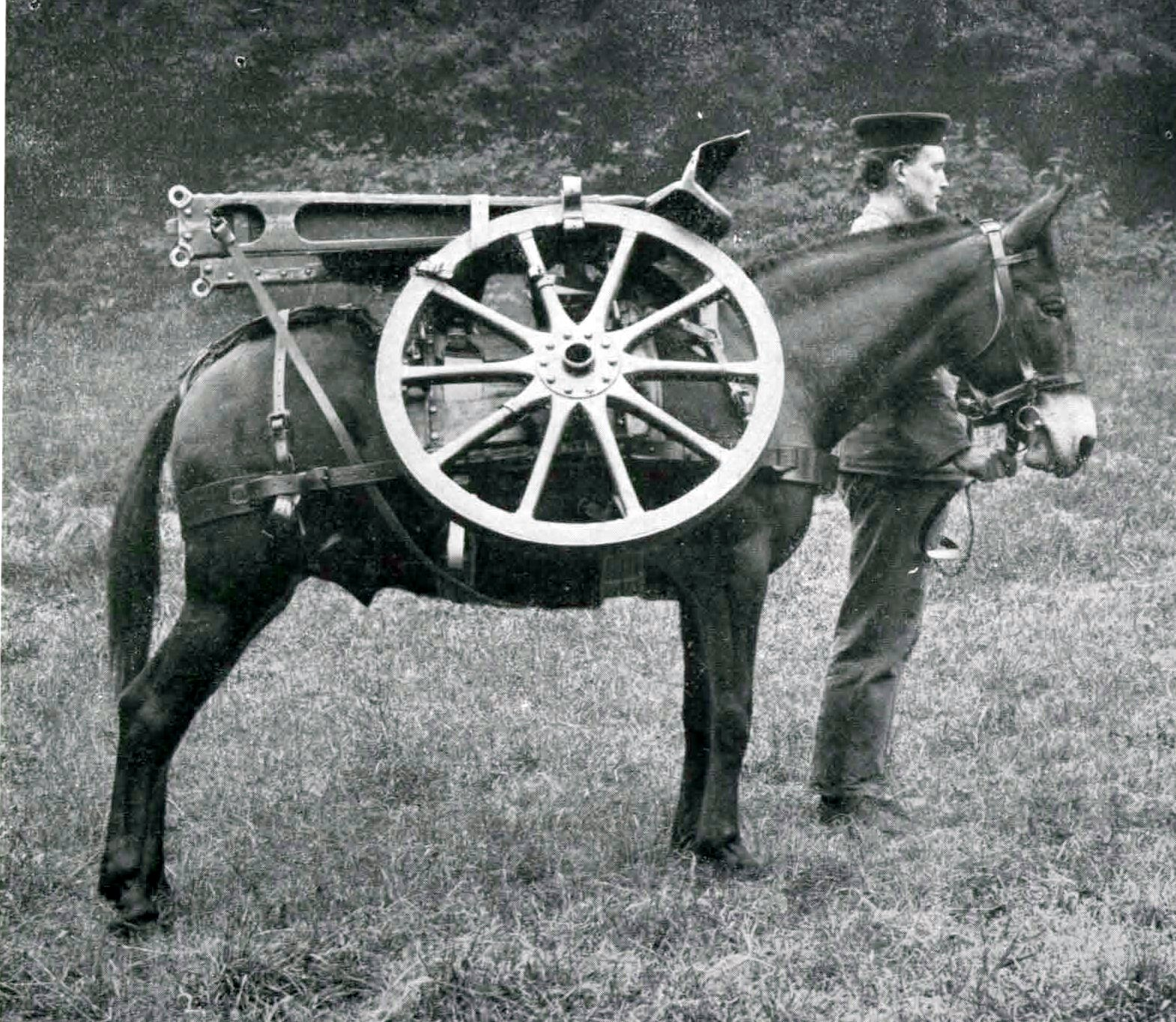
The tail of a carriage.

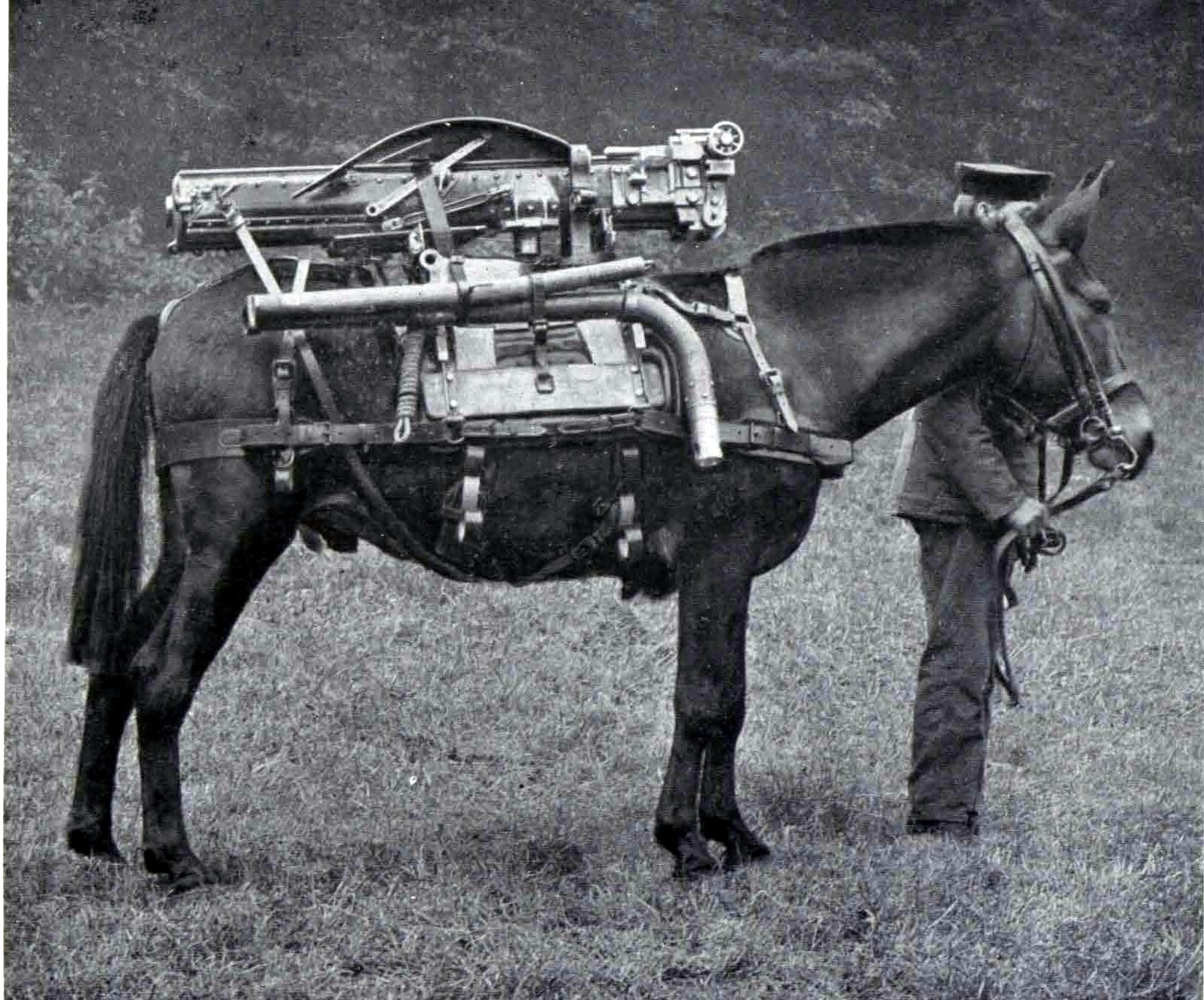
The recoil mechanism.

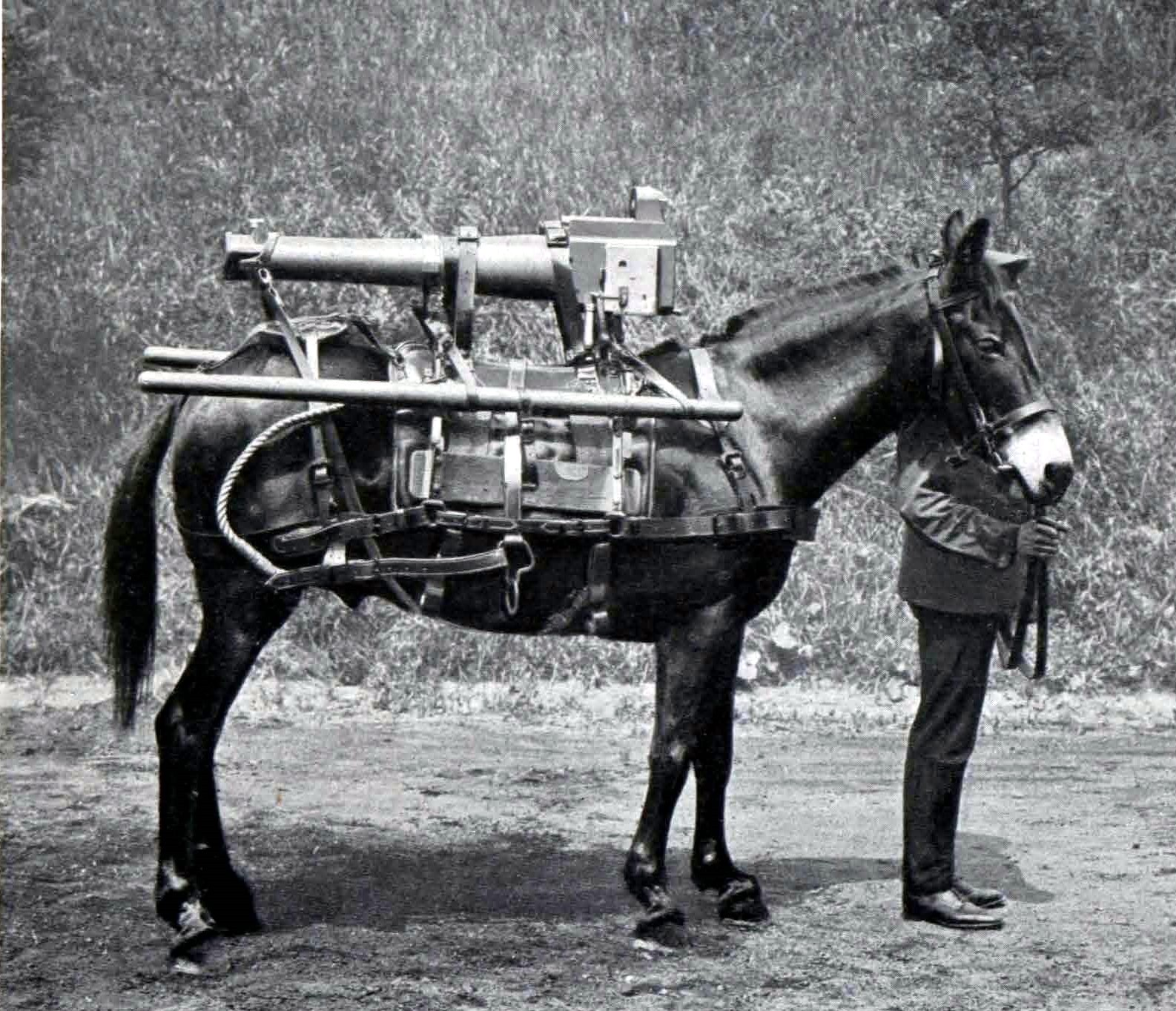
The barrel.

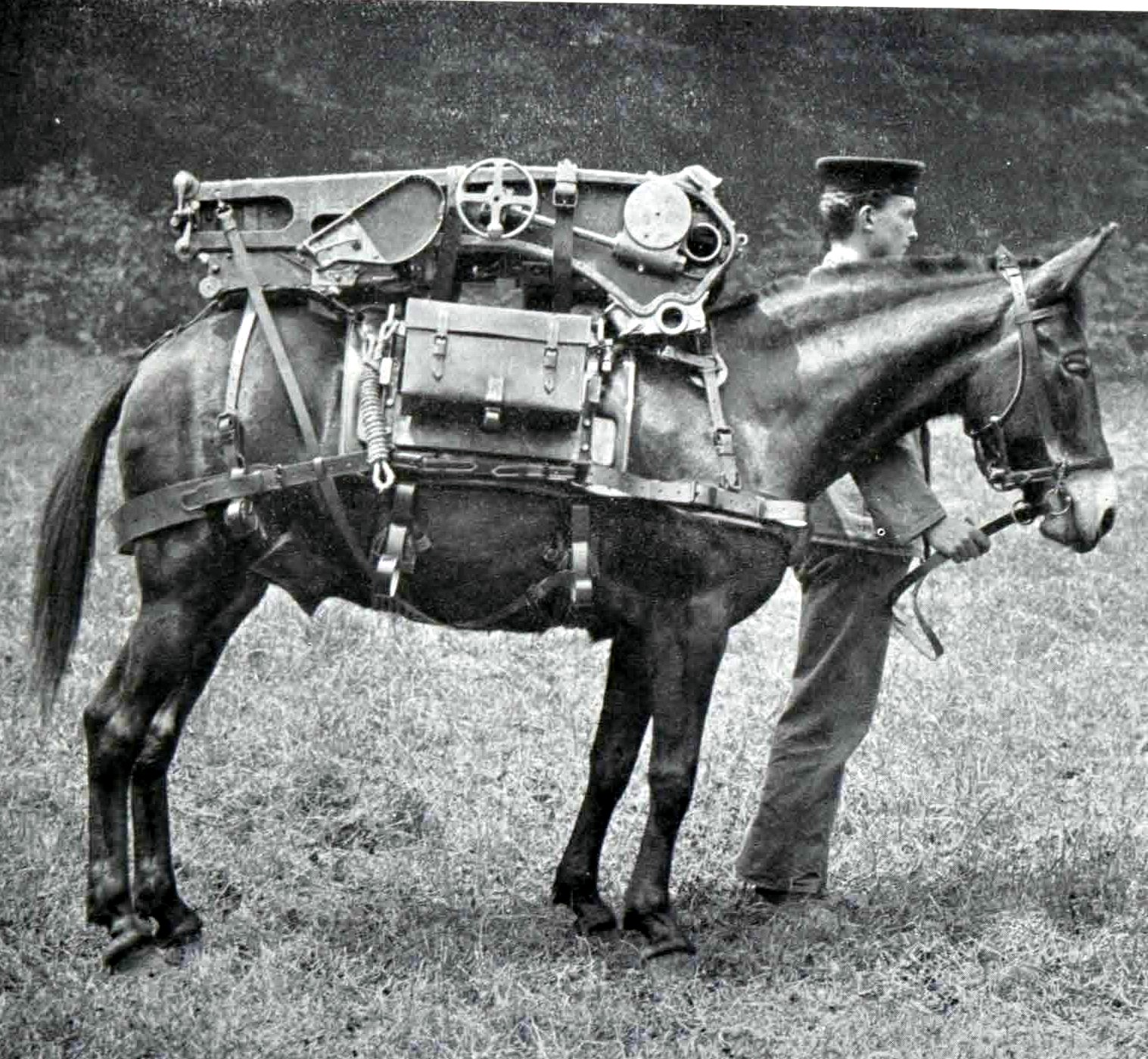
The front of the carriage.

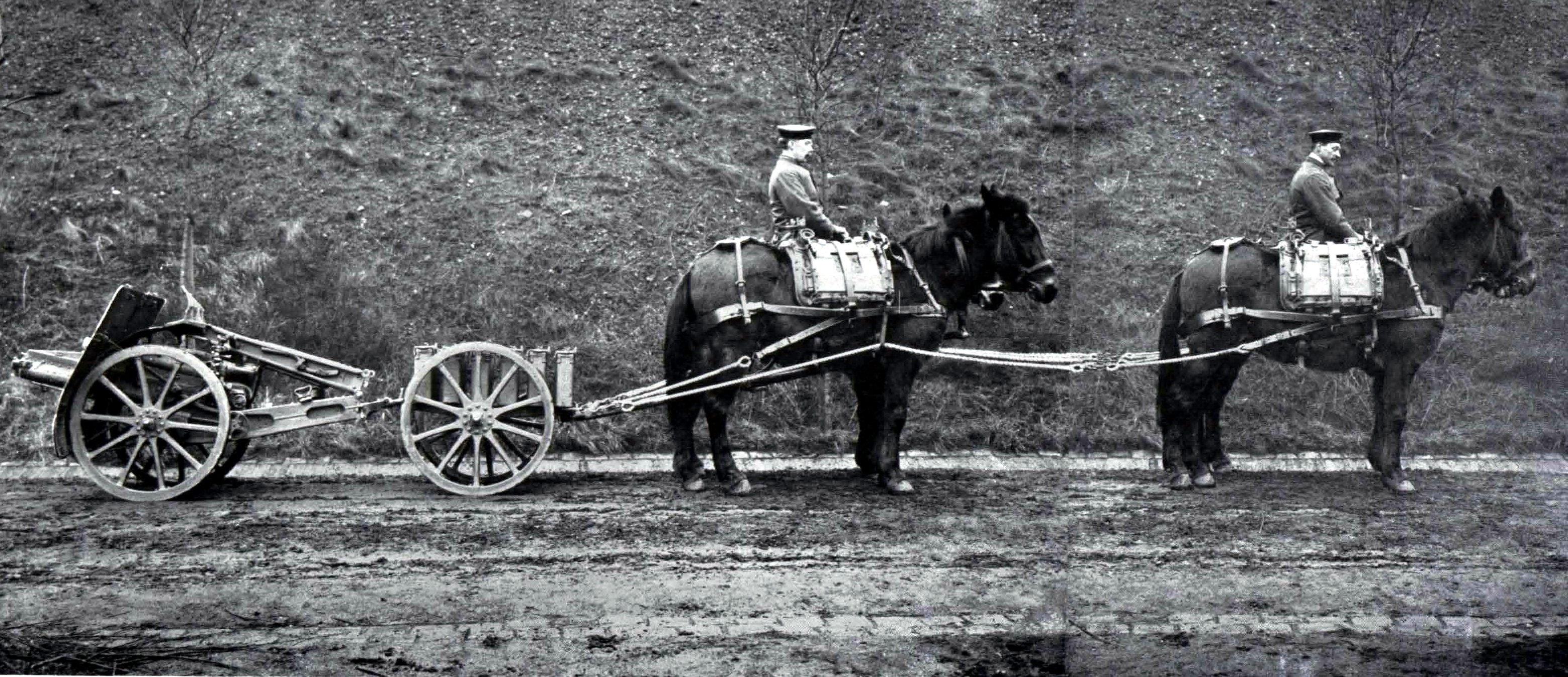
A folded GebirgsKanone attached to a caisson for towing.

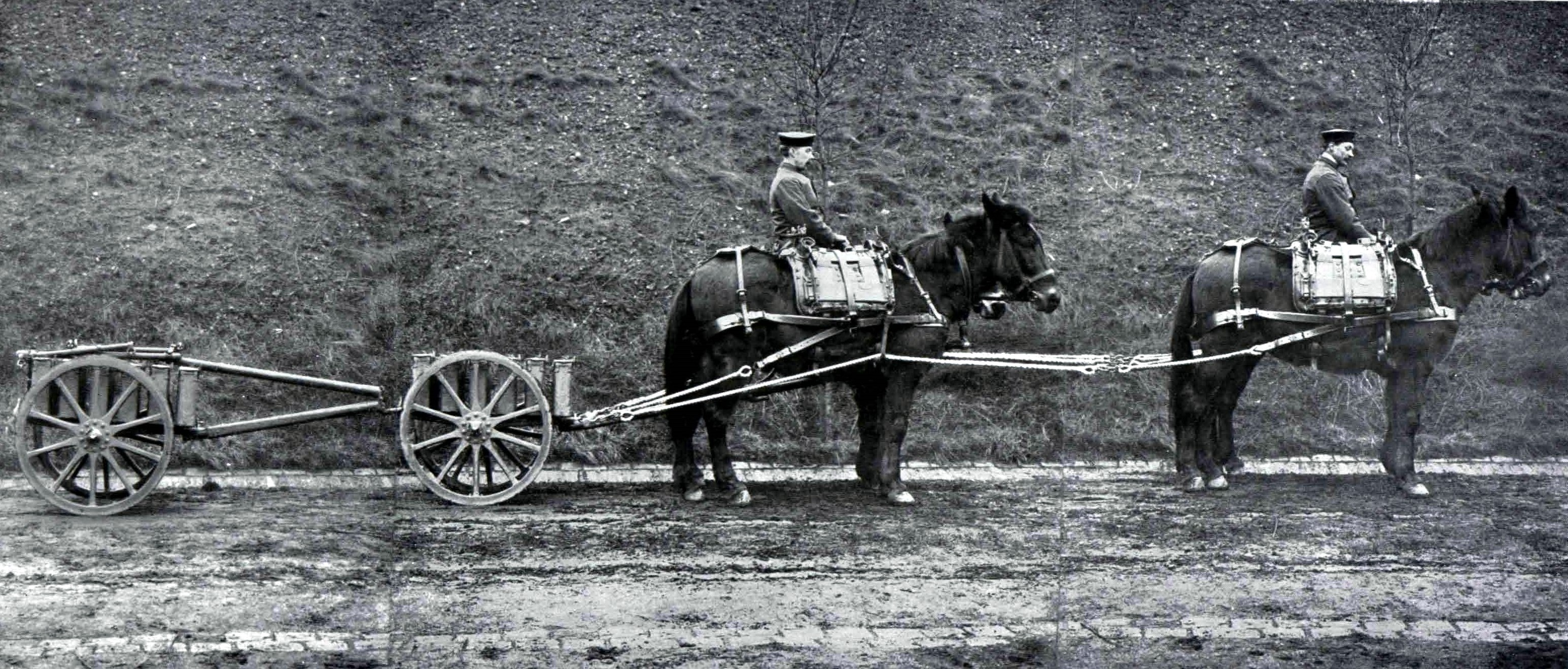
Two caissons attached for towing.
