= Taiyuan Arsenal =

Chinese arsenal in Shanxi

Taiyuan Arsenal (Chinese: 太原兵工廠) was established by the Shanxi warlord, Yan Xishan who had become the Governor-General of Shanxi province in 1912. From the outset he was very interested in building an arsenal for manufacturing weapons to equip his Army. His motto was, "Armed force is the backing of justice". Construction on his plant was begun in 1912, and it was originally named Shanxi Machinery Bureau. As it expanded, it later became known as the Shanxi Military Technology Practice Factory.

== During the Warlord Era and Nanjing Decade ==
In 1923 the arsenal began making a Type 12 infantry gun, with a maximum range of 5,000 meters. In 1925, they began making a Type 14 infantry howitzer. Both were designed for mountain warfare. They also were able to set up production of copies of a German 105 mm heavy mountain gun and 88 mm field gun. When the war with Japan began they had produced 24 heavy mountain guns and 24 field guns to replace the heavy losses during combat to the Japanese forces.

In 1926, the Arsenal at Taiyuan had produced 1500 rifles, 500 Mauser type Broom handle Military Pistols, 300 mortars, mortar shells, hand grenades and three million rounds of ammunition per month with foreign technicians, assisted by American trained Chinese, supervising and training 8,000 Chinese workers.

By 1930, it had 3,800 pieces of machinery and 15,000 workers and technicians. The plant was fully capable of producing not only pistols, rifles, and submachine guns, but also heavy machine guns, mortars, cannons, grenades, and other items. Taiyuan Arsenal was a major producer of both the ZB vz. 26 light machine guns and Thompson submachine guns.

== During the Second Sino-Japanese War ==
With its capture by the Japanese in November 1937, following the Battle of Taiyuan the Taiyuan Arsenal continued to operate producing the ZB vz. 26 light machine guns, but chambered for the Japanese 6.5 mm caliber cartridge instead of the Chinese 7.92 mm.

Meanwhile, munitions industry production was moved away from the Japanese resulting in a sudden reduction in output. Initially raw material depended entirely on the partial half-finished products and the material which were carried away from Taiyuan factories. Later demolition of enemy railroads provided rails to make the raw materials. Light machine guns were made in Shaanxi at a Chenggu factory, rifles were made in a Xiangning factory, pistols in another factory, and each place made hand grenades to make up for the lack of weapon production. Yan's munitions output was not steady due to lack of materials. In the later Sino-Japanese War period, these factories monthly production of rifles was 800, light machine guns 300, pistols only a few dozens, hand grenades approximately 10,000. These arms and ammunition supported the Chinese front during the Sino-Japanese War.

== During the Chinese Civil War ==
Recovered by Yan Xishan after August 1945 the Arsenal had been looted by the Japanese. He tried every effort to rebuild its productive capacity, taking machinery from factories of Japanese and puppet sympathizers, as long as they were the special purpose machines which the munitions industry needed and rebuilt his steel industry.

By late 1948 during the Chinese Civil War, the monthly production of the Arsenal was 3,000 Mauser Type 24 rifles, 300 7.92 mm ZB 26 light machine guns, 60 7.92 mm Type 24 Maxim water-cooled machine guns (MG08/30), 8 75 mm field guns, and 60,000 grenades, 15,000 mortar rounds, 7,000 rounds of artillery shells, swords, bayonets and small arms ammunition. But near the end small arms 7.92 mm ammunition production was down. Over 150,000 Red Army soldiers surrounded the city and it was necessary to air drop ingots of brass for the production of ammunition casings. Early in 1949 two Curtiss C-46 transports from Civil Air Transport flown by American pilots landed on an improvised runway delivering dynamite and blasting caps to destroy the steel mills and arsenal. However, when the city fell in the spring the arsenal fell to Communist hands in good shape, providing a solid base for their armaments industry.

General Yan was the Minister of Department of War and he fled for Taiwan and died there.

== See also ==
- Self-Strengthening Movement
- Hanyang Arsenal
- Foochow Arsenal
- Great Hsi-Ku Arsenal
- Jiangnan Shipyard
- List of Chinese military equipment in World War II

== Sources ==
- Goldsmith, Dolf L., Arming the Dragon: Mauser Rifle Production in China 1880 - 1950, D. L. Goldsmith, San Antonio, Texas, 1997.
- 阎锡山与山西军火工业 (Yen Hsi-shan and the arms industry in Shanxi Province) referred to Sept. 25, 2009
- Review of Mauser C-96 Machine Pistol, This review appeared in Gun World of February 2001
