= Type 97 90 mm infantry mortar =

Type 97 90 mm mortar
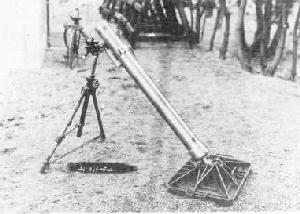
- Japanese Type 97-90 mm mortar
- Place of origin: Empire of Japan

Service history
- Used by: Imperial Japanese Army
- Wars: World War II

Production history
- Produced: 1942-1945
- No. built: 625

Specifications
- Mass: 106 kg (233 lb)
- Length: 1.32 m (4 ft 4 in)
- Barrel length: 1.2 m (4 ft)
- Width: 74 cm (2 ft 5 in) (baseplate)
- Shell weight: 5.2 kg (11 lb 7 oz)
- Caliber: 90.5 mm (3.56 in)
- Action: Manual
- Elevation: +45° to +85°
- Traverse: 10°
- Muzzle velocity: 227 m/s (740 ft/s)
- Effective firing range: 3.8 km (2.4 mi)

The Type 97 90 mm infantry mortar was a simplified version of the Japanese Type 94 90 mm Infantry Mortar.

Japanese 90mm, 120mm, and 150mm mortars were labeled as "trench mortars" and were effectively controlled by Imperial Japanese Army artillery units instead of infantry units. Initially Japanese trench mortars where primarily developed as chemical-delivery weapons, but would mainly see service in conventional roles during the Greater East Asia War. The Type 94 90mm mortar was replaced in production by the similar but lighter Type 97 90mm mortar, which removed unnecessary recoil mechanisms.

== Design ==
The Type 90-mm mortar was a Stokes-Brandt type mortar similar in general appearance to the US 81-mm mortar, M1 and the Japanese Type 97 81 mm piece. The Type 97 is approximately 120 lb (54 kg) lighter than the Type 94 90 mm mortar. This weight saving was created largely by the elimination of the Type 94's recoil mechanism, which weighed 110 lb (50 kg). The bipod assembly of the Type 97 is 14 lb (6.4 kg) lighter than that on the Type 94. There is a cover for the level on the yoke of the Type 97 which is not on the Type 94, and the sliding bracket of the Type 97 is hinged to permit its easy removal from the leg of the bipod, whereas it is integral on the Type 94. Certain compromises in material and workmanship were made in the manufacture of the Type 97. The bipod feet and chain hooks were held to the legs of the bipod by pins, joined with solder, whereas on the Type 94 they are welded. No welds were polished on the Type 97, although no indications of fractures were reported despite the poor quality of the welding. The adjusting nut, sliding bracket, and hand wheels of the Type 97 are made of steel, rather than brass which was utilized in the Type 94.

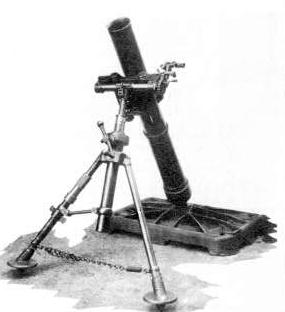
Type 97 90 mm mortar
