= Xiangying rifle =

Chinese semi-automatic rifle

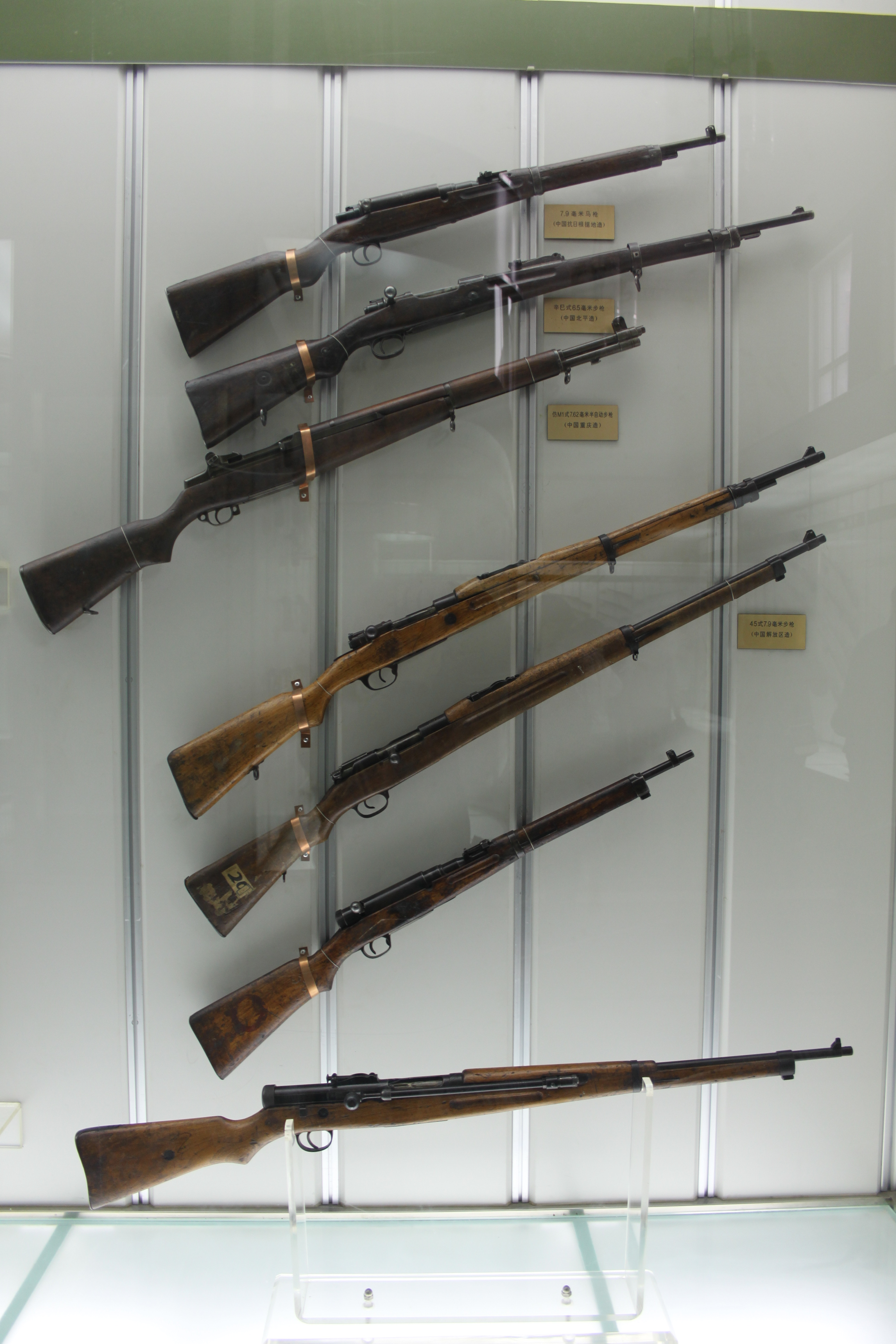
- The Xiangying rifle (bottom) on display
- Type: Semi-automatic rifle
- Place of origin: (Taiwan) Republic of China

Service history
- Used by: China
- Wars: Second Sino-Japanese War; World War II; Chinese Civil War

Production history
- Designer: Wen Chengding
- Designed: 1944
- Manufacturer: Jin-Sui District Arsenal No.2
- Produced: 1944-1949
- No. built: 4-7

Specifications
- Length: 45.3 inches (115 centimetres)
- Cartridge: 6.5x50mm Arisaka
- Caliber: 6.5mm
- Action: Gas-operated, Wedge-lock
- Feed system: 5-round internal box magazine
- Sights: Adjustable open sight

The Xiangying rifle (Chinese: 向应式步枪, Pinyin: xiàng yìng shì bùqiāng) also known as the Xiangying Type rifle, was a Chinese semi-automatic rifle developed near the end of World War II and produced by the Jin-Sui District Arsenal.

== History ==
The Xiangying rifle was designed by Wen Chengding (Chinese: 温承鼎) in 1944. Wen was a member of the Eighth Route Army. The rifle originally had no name but was later named after the 120th Division's political officer Guan Xiangying, who had died of an illness in 1946. Between 4 and 7 rifles were manufactured. One surviving rifle is currently on display at the Military Museum of the Chinese People's Revolution.

== Design ==
The Xiangying rifle was made from captured Type 38 rifle parts. For example, the barrel, the sling mount hardware and the bayonet mount. However, the receiver, the bolt and the stock are all originally made parts. Unlike the regular Type 38 rifle, the Xiangying rifle lacked the Arisaka's distinctive dust cover; however, it still had a bayonet mount like the Type 38 rifle and was chambered in the same round (6.5×50mmSR Arisaka). The Xiangying rifle is modified with an external gas piston on the right side of the rifle. The gas piston, with the return spring nested outside of it, is connected to the base of the bolt handle. It also had a recoil compensator. Its bolt, operated by a long stroke gas system, can be described as a wedge lock, not dissimilar to earlier designs such as the General Liu rifle or the Mannlicher 1886-88 lines.
