= Type 94 75 mm mountain gun =

Japanese Type 94 75 mm mountain gun
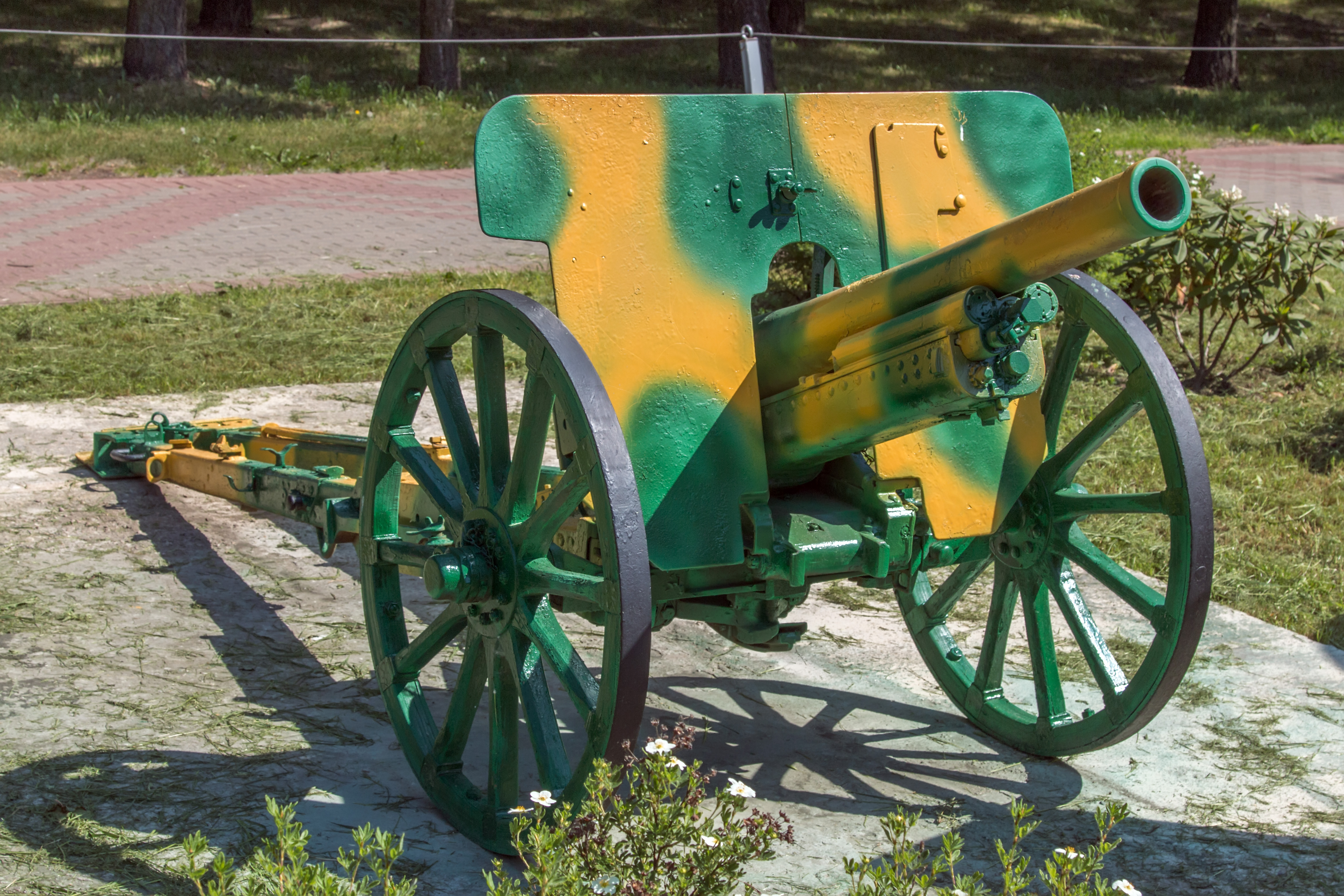
- A Type 94 75 mm mountain gun model 1934 in the Great Patriotic War Museum.
- Type: Mountain gun
- Place of origin: Empire of Japan

Service history
- In service: 1935–1945
- Used by: Imperial Japanese Army
- Wars: Second Sino-Japanese War, World War II

Production history
- Unit cost: 11,700 yen ($3,144 USD) in August 1939
- Produced: 1935, forward
- No. built: approx. 1,550

Specifications
- Mass: 544 kg (1,199 lb) Firing; 495 kg (1,091 lb) Traveling
- Length: 3.81 m (12 ft 6 in) Firing (trails open); 3.89 m (12 ft 9 in) (trails closed); 3.96 m (13 ft 0 in) Traveling
- Barrel length: 1.56 m (5 ft 1 in) L/20.8
- Width: 1.023 m (3 ft 4 in) Track 1.354 m (4 ft 5 in) Maximum
- Height: 2 ft 11 in (0.89 m)
- Crew: 4-5
- Shell: 75 x 294 mm R
- Caliber: 75 mm (2.95 in)
- Barrels: single
- Breech: Horizontal sliding-block
- Recoil: Hydro-pneumatic
- Carriage: Split trail with demountable spade plates, and fixed trail blocks, 2 steel band tires on spoked wheels
- Elevation: −10° to +45°
- Traverse: 40°
- Rate of fire: 15 rpm for 2 minutes 4 rpm for 15 minutes 2 rpm continuous
- Muzzle velocity: (HE) 355 m/s (1,165 ft/s)
- Effective firing range: (HE) 8 km (5.0 mi)
- Feed system: Manual
- Sights: Panoramic

The Type 94 75 mm mountain gun (九四式山砲, Kyūyon-shiki nanagō-miri Sanpō) was a mountain gun used as a general-purpose infantry support gun by the Imperial Japanese Army during the Second Sino-Japanese War and World War II. It superseded the Type 41 75 mm mountain gun to become the standard pack artillery piece of Japanese infantry divisions. It was superior to the Type 41 in range and in weight. The Type 94 number was designated for the year the gun was accepted, 2594 in the Japanese imperial year calendar, or 1934 in the Gregorian calendar.

== History and development ==
Combat experience with the Type 41 mountain gun during the invasion of Manchuria indicated to the Imperial Japanese Army General Staff that the existing primary mountain gun lacked not only in firepower and accuracy, but also was not as easily transportable under difficult terrain as had been hoped. The army technical bureau was assigned a project to develop a replacement in 1931. The first prototype was tested in 1932, and the design released for production by September 1934 as the "Type 94". However, plans to re-equip all artillery regiments with the new weapon were continually postponed due to budgetary priorities.

== Design ==
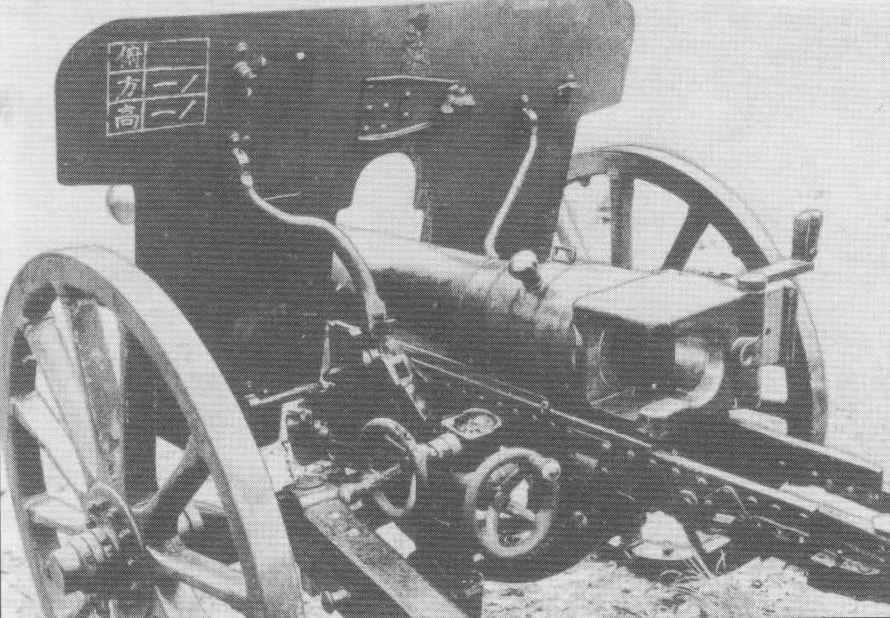
Rear view of the Type 94 75 mm mountain gun

The Type 94 75 mm mountain gun had a single-piece gun barrel with a sliding breechblock based on German Krupp and French designs, and a long split-trail carriage with spade plates for stabilizers with a hydro-pneumatic recoil mechanism based on French Schneider designs. The crew was partially protected by a gun shield made of 1/8-inch (3 mm) thick armor plate. It had pintle traverse, and an equalizing arrangement which gave it three-point suspension. Since it was trunnioned at the center of balance, it did not require equilibrators. It could be fired with trails closed or open.

The gun could be broken down into eleven pack loads within three to five minutes for transport by animals or men. The heaviest component weighed 210 pounds (95 kg), and the weapon was intended to be transported by six pack horses, or 18 men (although during the Bougainville campaign of 1943–1945 it was carried by 41 men because of the extremely difficult terrain on Bougainville). In daylight, the gun could be reassembled within 10 minutes and disassembled in from three to five minutes. The tasks also could be performed at night after the parts were rubbed with luminous bark, but took five to 10 minutes longer.

The gun fired the same projectiles as other 75 mm pieces and had a cartridge case identical in length with that used in the Type 38 75 mm field gun. This case was longer than that used in the Type 41 mountain gun because the propelling charge used in Model 94 ammunition was less than that used in the ammunition for the Type 38, and firing the Type 38's ammunition from the Type 94 would damage the gun. The Type 38 lacked both a howitzer trajectory and varying charges with which to adjust the trajectory of rounds it fired, and this increased the dead space for the Model 94 when it fired in mountainous terrain. The Type 94's counterrecoil was said to be so slow when the piece was fired at elevations above 30° that, rather than fire above that elevation, the artillery battery displaced forward to maintain a higher rate of fire.

=== Ammunition ===
- High-explosive
  - M94 6 kilograms (13.2 lb) with 0.8 kilograms (1.8 lb) of TNT and M88 impact or delay fuses.
  - "A" 6.46 kilograms (14.24 lb) with picric acid and dinitro and M3 combination fuse
  - "B" 6.6 kilograms (14.6 lb) with 0.66 kilograms (1.46 lb) of picric acid and dinitro and M88 impact or delay fuse
  - M90/97 6.18 kilograms (13.62 lb) with 0.42 kilograms (0.93 lb) of TNT and M88 impact or delay fuse
  - M90 pointed HE 6.35 kilograms (14.00 lb) with TNT and M88 impact or delay fuse
- Armor-piercing
  - M95 APHE 6.2 kilograms (13.7 lb) with 0.045 kilograms (0.099 lb) of picric acid and dinitro M95 small AP base fuse
- Shrapnel
  - M90 shrapnel 7 kilograms (15.4 lb) with 0.1 kilograms (0.22 lb) of black powder with M5 combination fuse
  - M38 shrapnel 6.83 kilograms (15.06 lb) with 0.1 kilograms (0.22 lb) of black powder with M3 combination fuse
- Chemical
- Star
  - M90 illumination 5.65 kilograms (12.46 lb) with M5 combination fuse
- Incendiary
  - M90 incendiary 6.93 kilograms (15.28 lb) with black powder and M5 combination fuse
- Smoke
  - M90 smoke 5.73 kilograms (12.63 lb) with 0.1 kilograms (0.22 lb) of picric acid and dinitro with M88 impact fuse

== Combat record ==
Type 94 75 mm mountain gun was used extensively in Manchukuo during the Pacification of Manchukuo (1931–1942) and in China during the Second Sino-Japanese War (1937–1945). It was also assigned to units in the Southern Expeditionary Army and was sited in defensive positions on islands throughout the Netherlands East Indies and the South Seas Mandate. It was one of the most common weapons encountered by Allied forces in the closing stages of World War II.

Both North Korea′s Korean People's Army and the People's Republic of China′s People's Volunteer Army used Chinese copies of the Type 94 during the Korean War (1950–1953).
