= Jinling Arsenal =

Former factory in Nanjing

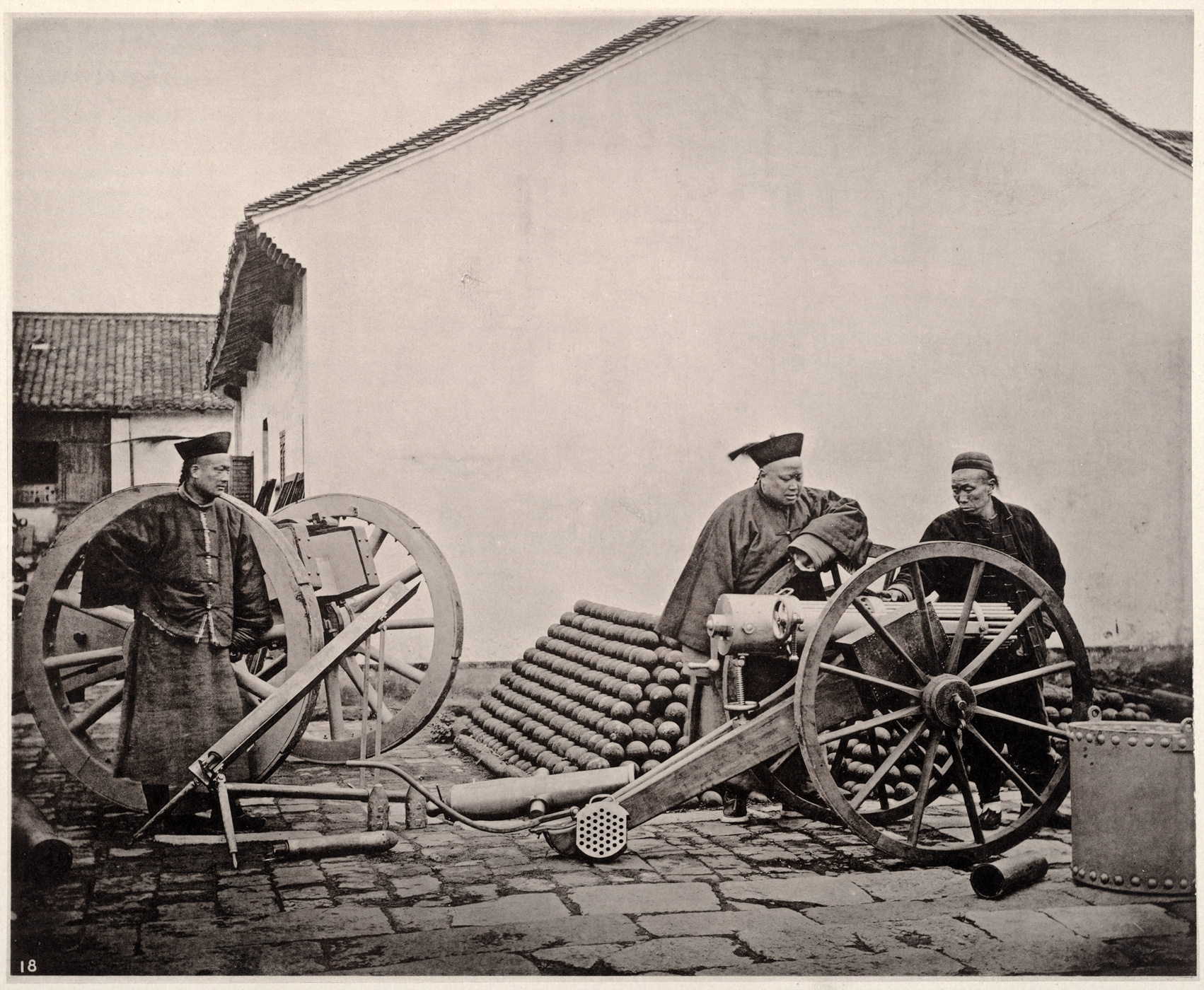
Nanjing Jinling Arsenal 1865 built by Li Hongzhang

The Jinling Arsenal (simplified Chinese: 金陵兵工厂) was a military arsenal located in Nanjing, established in 1865. It existed throughout the Late Qing to the People's Republic. It was also referred to as the Nanjing Arsenal.

== History ==
=== Establishment ===
Li Hongzhang initially established the Shanghai Foreign Gun Bureau as a military supply factory. In 1863, it was renamed the Suzhou Arsenal. By 1865, Li Hongzhang, now acting Governor-General of Liangjiang and with his office relocated to Nanjing from Suzhou, moved the Suzhou Arsenal to Nanjing. He then actively planned its expansion into what would become the Jinling Machine Manufacturing Bureau, which was, at the time, China's largest arsenal. Groundbreaking for the arsenal began on October 30, 1865, and construction was completed by August 1866, built on the former site of Xitian Temple. According to the Continued Compilation of Jiangning Prefecture Gazetteers (续纂江宁府志), the facility was extensive, including "a twelve-room official residence for commissioners; over eighty rooms for machinery and boilers, and more than fifty corridors." The architectural style of the buildings was modeled after Western designs. Following its completion, the arsenal began producing firearms, ammunition, and other military supplies, primarily to equip Li Hongzhang's Huai Army. The arsenal was making Hotchkiss, Maxim, and Nordenfeld guns by 1892.

=== Republican Era ===
After the establishment of the Republic of China, the function of military production continued here. In 1928, Chenggan Li served as the director of the factory. With the aim of “saving the nation by industry”, he began to reorganize the factory. In June 1929, it was renamed the Jinling Arsenal (金陵兵工厂). Its factory emblem featured a swastika, a symbol associated with Buddhism. From 1934 to 1937, two large-scale land expropriation projects were carried out on the western and northeastern sides of Majia Mountain, which brought a new look to the factory. The factory area increased from 76,000 square meters to 224,700 square meters, and the newly built and renovated building area was about 50,000 square meters. The new construction included mortar factories, tool factories, heavy machine gun factories, equipment factories, iron-foundry factories, gas mask factories, iron factories, wood factories, power plants, material laboratories and office buildings of the factory headquarters, as well as staff dormitories, hospitals, residences, children’s schools, etc., which were fully functional. Moreover, its spatial layout had already demonstrated a clear idea of functional zoning, which separated the production space, office and living spaces.

In July 1937, the Jinling Arsenal was relocated westward to Chongqing. Its original site was occupied by invading Japanese forces until Japan's surrender. In September 1946, it was renamed the 60th Arsenal (六〇兵工厂) and during this period, attempts were made to replicate the American M1 Garand rifle.

By the end of 1948, the arsenal moved to Kaohsiung, leaving behind its factory buildings and old equipment. In April 1949, it was taken over by the Chinese People's Liberation Army.
