= Type 41 75 mm mountain gun =

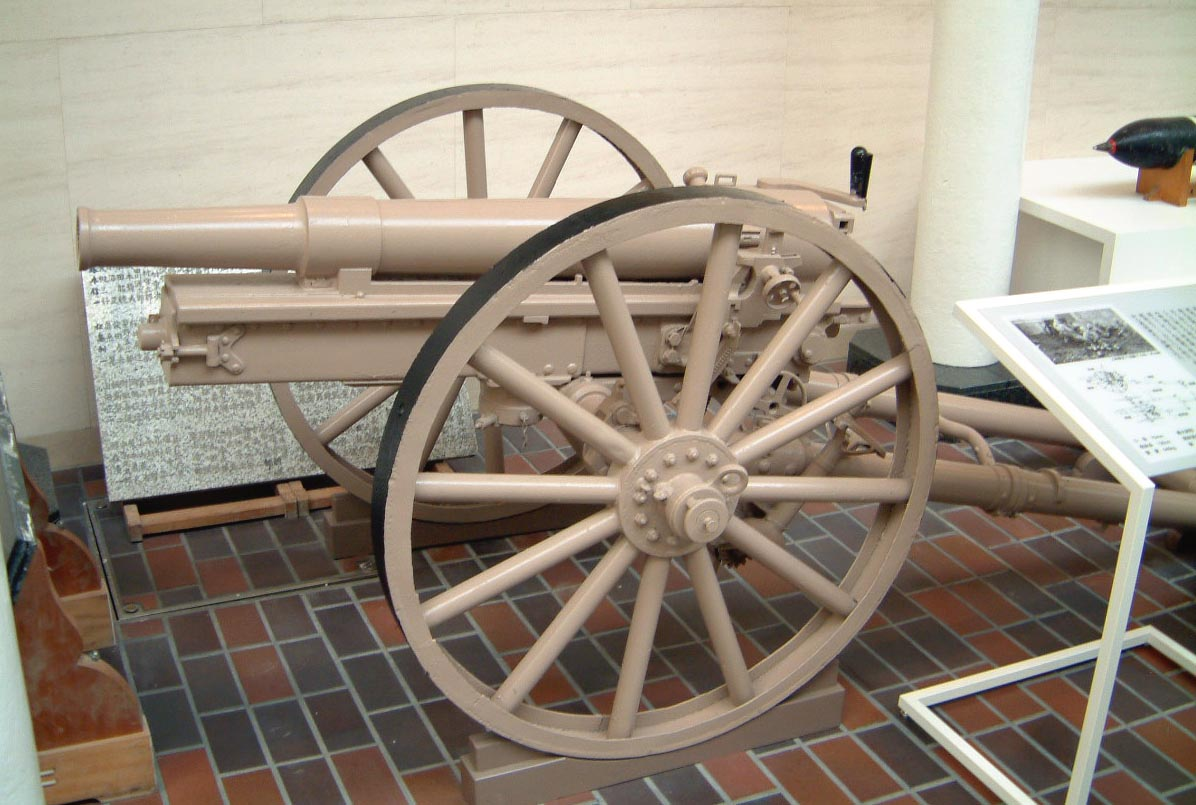
- A Type 41 at the Yasukuni Shrine
- Type: Mountain gun
- Place of origin: Japan

Service history
- In service: 1908–1945
- Used by: See operators
- Wars: World War I, Second Sino-Japanese War, World War II, First Indochina War

Production history
- Designer: Krupp
- Manufacturer: Osaka Arsenal
- Unit cost: 8,400 yen (US$2,257) in August 1939
- Produced: 1908, forward
- No. built: 3300~3800
- Variants: See variants

Specifications
- Mass: 544 kg (1,199 lb)
- Length: 4.31 m (14 ft 2 in)
- Barrel length: 1.1 m (3 ft 7 in) L/19.2
- Width: 1.219 m (4 ft)
- Crew: 13
- Caliber: 75 mm (2.95 in)
- Breech: interrupted screw
- Recoil: Hydro-spring
- Carriage: Box trail
- Elevation: -18° to +40°
- Traverse: 6°
- Muzzle velocity: 435 m/s (1,427 ft/s)
- Maximum firing range: 7,022 m (7,679 yd)

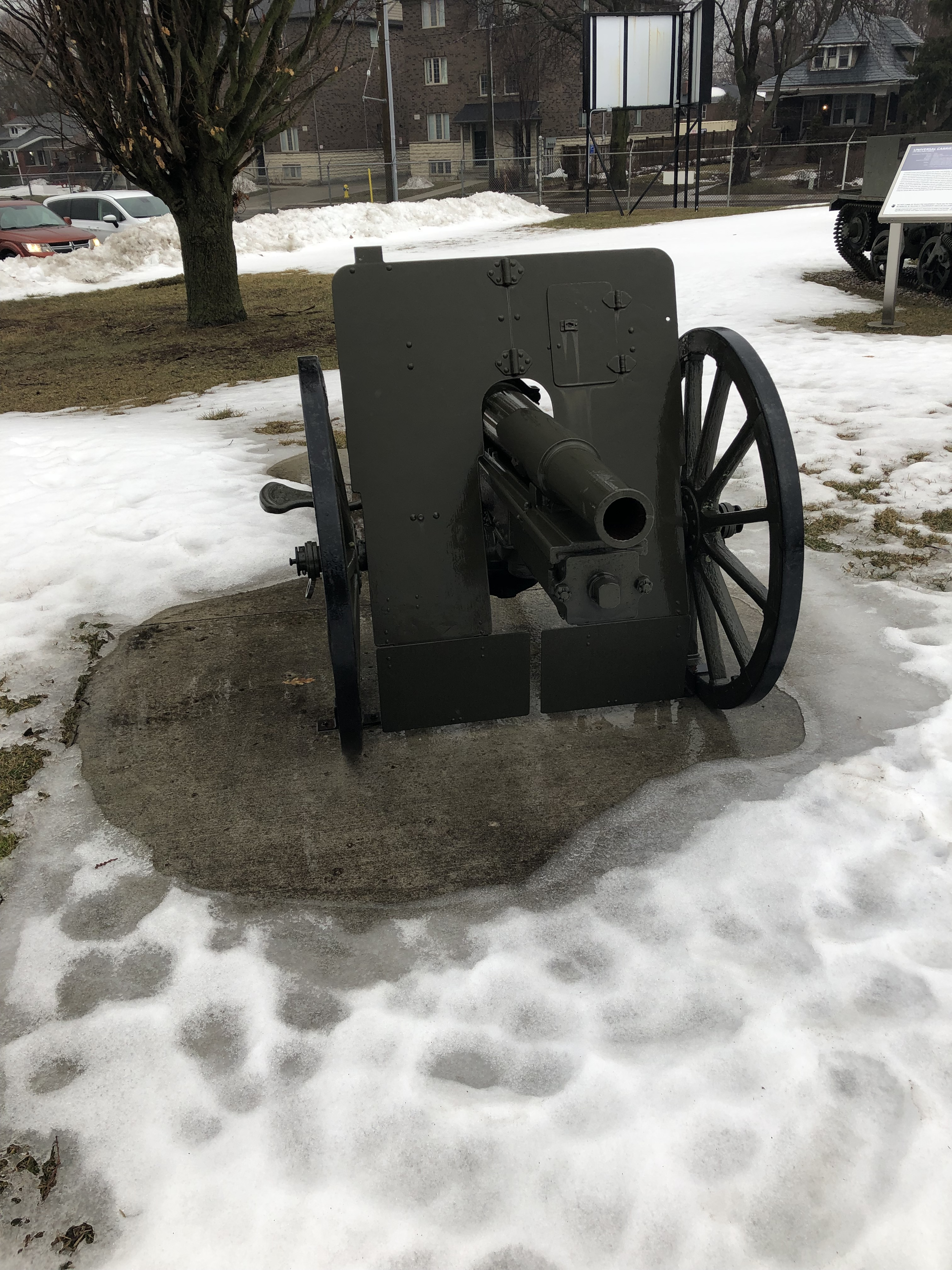
Type 41 Mountain Gun located at the Royal Canadian Regiment Museum in London, Ontario. This example was captured during the Aleutian Islands campaign.

The Type 41 75 mm mountain gun is a Japanese license-built copy of the recoiling Krupp M1908 mountain gun. The gun was introduced in 1908 and was in service until the end of World War II.

== History ==
The Japanese Army obtained the license rights to build a copy of the recoiling Krupp M1908 mountain gun. It entered service in 1908. The number 41 was designated based on the year the gun was accepted, the 41st year of Emperor Meiji's reign, equivalent to 1908 in the Gregorian calendar after the conclusion of the Russo-Japanese War. Originally it was the standard pack artillery weapon. It was superseded by the Type 94 75 mm mountain gun. Thereafter, it was used as an infantry "regimental" gun with four deployed to each infantry regiment, and referred to as "rentai ho" (regimental artillery). Two gun shields were produced for the weapon: an early type which folded into thirds, and a late type which folded in half. It could be manually carried or disassembled and carried by horse, making it convenient for use in mountainous regions and areas with rugged terrain.

== Service ==
In service, the gun was operated by a thirteen-man crew consisting of twelve gunners and a squad leader. When the weapon was in service there would be an aimer, a loader, a firer, a person to swing the guns aim left or right, a person inserting the fuses into rounds and handing them to the loader, two gunners lying in reserve to the left and right of the gun, and the squad leader sitting a slight distance to the rear of the weapon. The remaining five men would ferry ammunition in relays from the ammunition squad, which would typically be in cover a few hundred meters behind the gun's position.

The weapon could be transported in assembled form by its thirteen-man squad or broken down into parts and carried on six packhorses using special harnesses, with a seventh horse carrying the ammunition.

Two types of impact fuse were available for the Type 97's 75 mm high explosive round: one with a delay of 0.05 seconds and another with a delay of 1 second. U.S. Army testing of the weapon at a range of 3,200 yards (2,900 m) resulted in 75 percent of the rounds falling in a rectangle measuring 20 by 30 yards (18 by 27 m). At its maximum range of 7,100 m or 7,800 yards, 75 percent of the rounds fell within a rectangle measuring 100 by 200 yards (90 by 180 m).

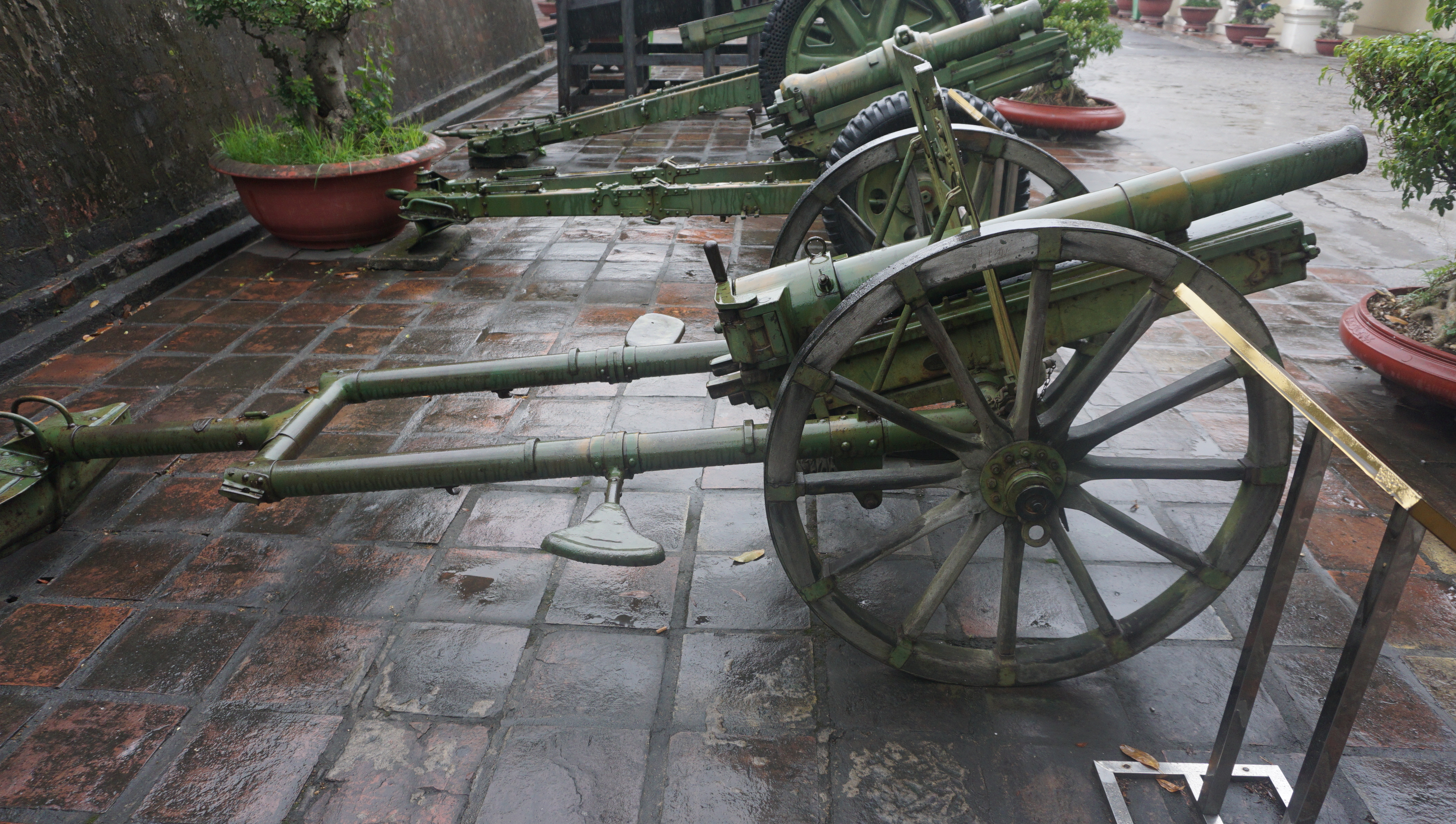
Type 41 75 mm mountain gun in the Vietnam Military History Museum in Hanoi, Vietnam.

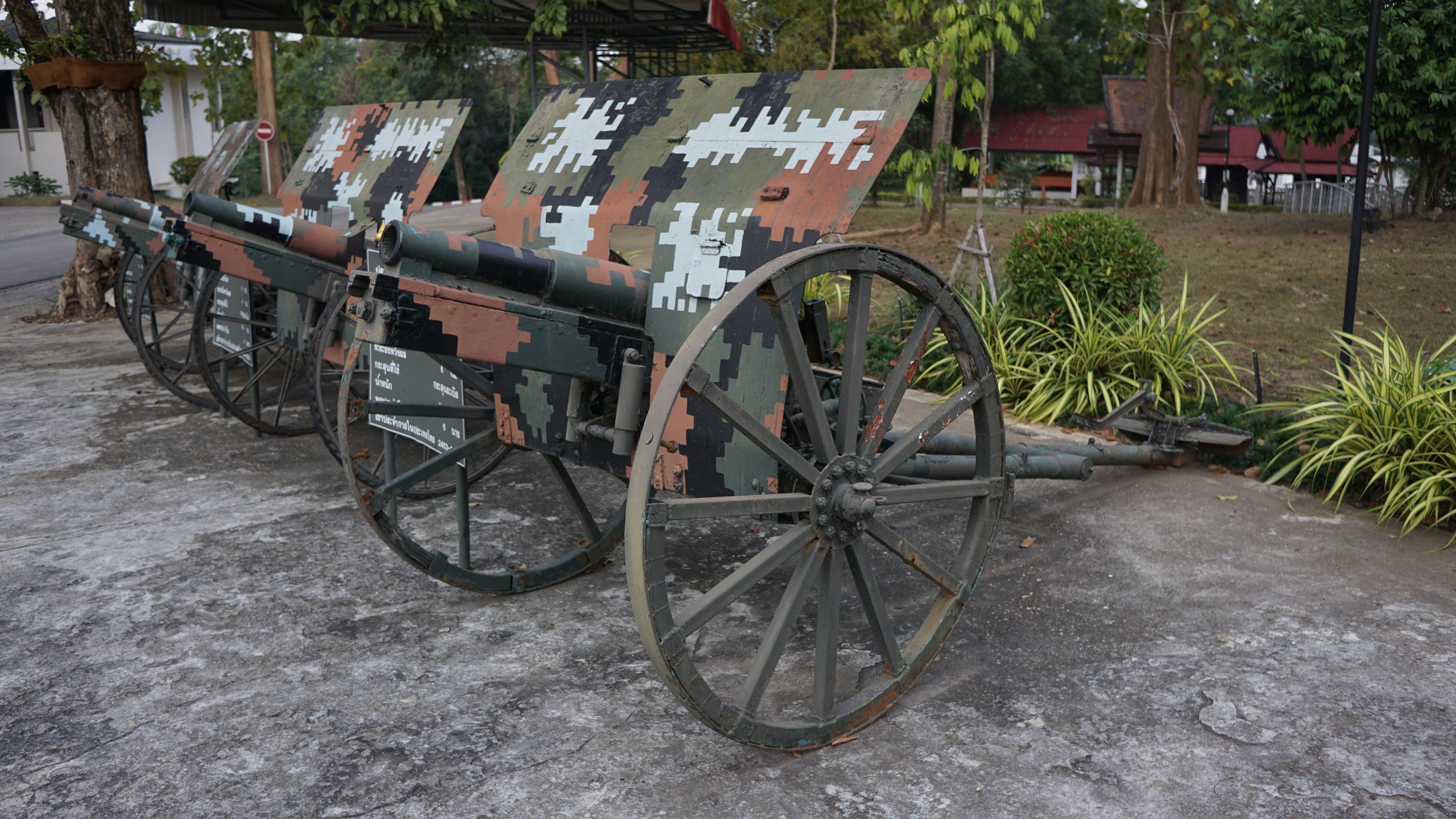
Type 41 mountain guns display in Surasakmontree Army Camp, Lampang, Thailand, 2016

Before and after World War I, the Japanese exported some guns to various warlords in China. The Chinese also manufactured copies of the Type 41 (usually without the gun shield). A small number of Japanese guns were captured and used during the Second Sino-Japanese War.

A dozen guns seized from the Japanese forces in 1945 were reported to be in service with the People's Army of Vietnam during the battle of Dien Bien Phu, where they were used to provide short-range direct fire support against the French, which led the latter to mistakenly believe they were being struck by recoilless rifles.

== Variants ==
- Taishō Type 6 − A variant with a modified recoil system exported to friendly warlords in China after World War I.
- Hanyang Type 10 − Chinese copy of the Type 6 produced in 1921−1928 at the Hanyang Arsenal. Range: 6,000 m (6,600 yd).
- Shanxi Type 13 − A copy of the Hanyang Type 10 made by the Taiyuan Arsenal in 1924−1932. Range: 6,000 m (6,600 yd)
- Shanxi Type 17 − Improved version of the Shanxi Type 13 with range extended to 7,000 m (7,700 yd).
- Shenyang Type 14 − Chinese copy of the Meiji Type 41 or Taishō Type 6 with a shorter barrel built by the Shenyang Arsenal in 1925−1931. Range: 6,000 m (6,600 yd).

== Ammunition ==
- Type 98 high-explosive – 4.5 kg (9.9 lb)
- Type 97 high-explosive – 5.5 kg (12 lb)
- Type 94 high-explosive – 6.01 kg (13.2 lb)
- Type 90 high-explosive – 5.67 kg (12.5 lb)
- Type 95 armor-piercing high-explosive – can penetrate 20 mm of steel plate at 3,000 m – 6.2 kg (14 lb)
- Type 1 armor-piercing – 6.5 kg (14 lb)
- Type 38 shrapnel – 6.8 kg (15 lb)
- Type 90 shrapnel – 282 10.5 gram lead balls and 0.1 kg black powder bursting charge – 7.0 kg (15.4 lb)
- Type 2 hollow charge – can penetrate 102 mm of RHA - 3.54 kg (7.8 lb)
- Incendiary
- Type 90 smoke (white phosphorus) – 5.72 kg (12.6 lb)
- Type 90 incendiary – 6.9 kg (15 lb)
- Liquid incendiary projectile – 5.33 kg (11.8 lb)
- Type 90 illuminating – 5.64 kg (12.4 lb)
- Vomit gas projectile – 6.01 kg (13.2 lb)

== Operators ==
- China − Imported by several warlords before and after WWI and locally produced copies. A small number were captured and used during the Second Sino-Japanese War
- Empire of Japan
- North Vietnam − Captured from the Japanese in 1945
