= SS Empire Conyngham =

World War II merchant ship of the United Kingdom

History
- Name: Marie (1899–1923); Norburg (1923–25); Gauja (1925–41); Friedrich (1941–45); Empire Conyngham (1945–49)
- Owner: Flensburger Dampfschiff Gesellschaft (1899–1923); Ozean Dampsfchiff AG (1923–35); Latvian Government (1935–41); Otto Wiggers (1941–45) Ministry of War Transport (1945); Ministry of Transport (1945–49)
- Operator: H Schuldt (1899–1923); Ozean Dampsfchiff AG (1923–35); Valsts Kuģu Pārvalde (1935–41); Otto Wiggers (1941–45); Ministry of War Transport (1945); Ministry of Transport (1945–49)
- Port of registry: (German Empire) Flensburg (1899–1919); (Weimar Republic) Flensburg (1919–25); (Latvia) Riga (1925–41); (Nazi Germany) Rostock (1941–45); (United Kingdom) London (1945–49)
- Builder: Neptun AG
- Launched: 1899
- Out of service: 20 June 1949
- Identification: Code Letters TBDP (1925–33); Code Letters YLCZ (1933–41); Code Letters DOTD (1941–45); Code Letters GKWN (1945–49)
- Fate: Scuttled

General characteristics
- Type: Cargo ship
- Tonnage: 1,501 GRT (1899–1935); 1,408 GRT (1935–49); 895 NRT (1899–1935); 829 NRT (1935–49)
- Length: 241 ft 5 in (73.58 m)
- Beam: 36 ft 1 in (11.00 m)
- Depth: 16 ft 9 in (5.11 m)
- Installed power: Triple expansion steam engine
- Propulsion: Screw propeller

Location of the scuttling of Empire Conyngham.

Empire Conyngham was a 1,408 GRT cargo ship that was built as Marie in 1899 by Neptun AG, Rostock, Germany for German owners. A sale in 1923 saw her renamed Norburg. She was sold to Latvia in 1925 and renamed Gauja, serving until 1941 when she was captured by the Kriegsmarine in the Baltic Sea. In 1945, she was seized by the Allies, passed to the Ministry of War Transport (MoWT) and was renamed Empire Conyngham. In 1946, she was scuttled with a cargo of obsolete bombs.

== Description ==
The ship was built in 1899 by Neptun AG, Rostock.

The ship was 241 feet 5 inches (73.58 m) long, with a beam of 36 feet 1 inch (11.00 m) and a depth of 16 feet 9 inches (5.11 m). She was assessed at 1,501 GRT, 895 NRT.

The ship was propelled by a triple expansion steam engine, which had cylinders of 18 inches (46 cm), 30 1/2 inches (77 cm) and 48 inches (120 cm) diameter by 33 1/8 inches (84 cm) stroke. The engine was built by Neptun AG.

== History ==
Marie was built for the Flensburger Dampfschiff Gesellschaft, Flensburg. She was operated under the management of H Schuldt. In 1923, she was sold to Ozean Dampschiff AG and was renamed Norburg. In 1925, she was sold to the Latvian Government and was renamed Gauja. Her port of registry was Riga and the Code Letters TBDP were allocated. Gauja was operated under the management of Valsts Kuģu Pārvalde. By 1935, her code letters had been changed to YLCZ and the ship was assessed at 1,408 GRT, 829 NRT.

On 8 June 1941, Gauja was captured by the Kriegsmarine in the Baltic Sea. She was renamed Friedrich and operated by Otto Wiggers, Rostock. Friedrich was captured by the Allies in May 1945. She was passed to the MoWT and renamed Empire Conyngham. Her port of registry was changed to London and the Code Letters GKWN were allocated. On 18 June 1949, Empire Conyngham departed Dartmouth, Devon with a cargo of obsolete bombs. She was escorted by HMS Burghead Bay. On 20 June, she was scuttled in the Bay of Biscay (47°52′N 8°51′W).
