= North China Type 19 handgun =

North China type 19 pistol
- Type: Semi-automatic pistol
- Place of origin: Japan/China

Service history
- In service: 1944–1945
- Wars: Second Sino-Japanese War, World War II

Production history
- Manufacturer: North China Engineering Co Ltd, Shenyang
- Produced: 1944–1945
- No. built: c. 100

Specifications
- Mass: 1106 g (2 lb 7oz) unloaded
- Length: 235 mm (9.25 in)
- Barrel length: 118 mm (4.65 in)
- Height: 158 mm (6.22 in)
- Cartridge: 8×22mm Nambu
- Caliber: 8 mm
- Action: Short recoil, locked breech
- Feed system: 8–round magazine
- Sights: Blade, V-notch

The North China Type 19 (北支一九式拳銃) is a military sidearm produced during World War II by the Empire of Japan and China. Produced in China during the final stages of World War II, the North China Type 19 was most likely made in an effort to supply troops based in Manchuria when supply lines from Japan became disrupted by Allied submarines and bombing. Officially approved by the chief of the ordnance bureau, the Type 19 is very scarce with only eleven surviving examples known.

The pistol is a redesign of the Type 14 Nambu pistol but all pertinent ordinance records were lost during World War II.

== Design ==
The Type 19 pistol is an adaptation of the Type 14 intended to simplify manufacture and improve the original design. The safety lever was relocated to the left side of the receiver behind the top of the grip panel for easier access. A takedown lever was added on the right side of the receiver forward of the trigger guard to simplify the disassembly process.

== Users ==
- Collaborationist Chinese Army
- Empire of Japan: Type 19s used by the China Expeditionary Army in small numbers.
- China: Some Type 19s adopted by the PLA after the North China Engineering Company factory was taken over.
