= Bergmann 1896 =

Semi-automatic pistol

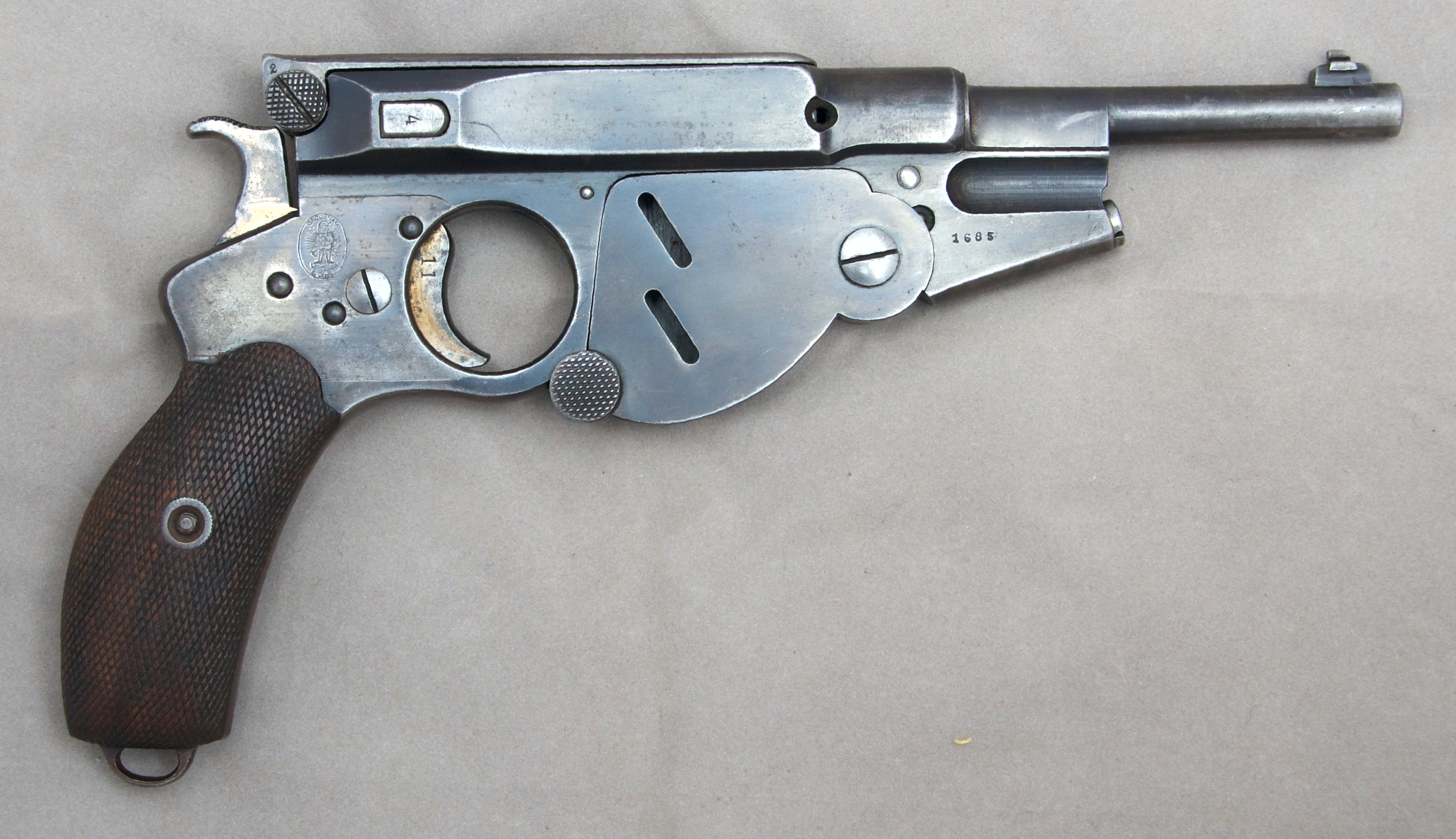
- Bergmann 1896 No 3, 6.5mm, S/n 1685, right side, manufactured c.1896.
- Type: Semi-automatic pistol
- Place of origin: German Empire

Production history
- Designer: Louis Schmeisser

Specifications
- Mass: 1.13 kg (nº 3)
- Length: 254 mm (nº 3)
- Barrel length: 102 mm (nº 3)
- Cartridge: Bergmann 1894/1896: 5mm Bergmann (nº 2); 6.5mm Bergmann (nº 3); 8×22mm Bergmann (nº 4); Bergmann 1897: 7.8mm Bergmann (nº 5); 10mm Bergmann M.1901
- Action: Blowback
- Muzzle velocity: 380 m/s (nº 3)
- Feed system: 5-round fixed magazine
- Sights: Fixed

The Bergmann 1894/1896/1897 was a family of 19th-century semi-automatic pistols developed by German designer Louis Schmeisser and sold by Theodor Bergmann's company.

This gun was released in the early days of automatic pistols, and was a contemporary of the Mauser C96 and Borchardt C-93 pistols. The Bergmann 1894/1896/1897 pistols failed to achieve the same widespread success. (Note: Although Bergmann himself later went on to design one of the earliest practical and successful sub-machine guns, the MP-18.)

There are several variations, but the internal mechanisms remain almost the same in all of them. The first cartridges in Bergmann pistols were grooveless, with the bullets having a sharp nose to avoid jams. Later pistols, however, have mechanical extractors and cartridges with grooved flanges. The M96 had an internal box-magazine holding five cartridges.

== M1893 ==
In 1893, Theodor Bergmann collaborated with Louis Schmeisser to create a new firearms, with their first pistol design being the Model 1893. The initial design patented in 1893 was chambered for a rimless 8mm cartridge.

The development of automatic pistols began with the goal of reducing the size of a rifle mechanism so that it could be held in one hand, so this gun has a magazine in front of the trigger like the (later) Mauser C96, but it uses the Mannlicher method of loading, where the clip, that also wraps around the sides of the bullet, is inserted.

However, the clip was not left in the gun, but had a round handle at the rear end that was removed after loading. There was an internal magazine in front of the trigger, and the fan-shaped cover on the right side was opened by rotating it forward, and the ammunition and clip were inserted into the magazine, and when the cover was closed, the feed lever worked to push the ammunition up.

The internal mechanism uses delayed blowback, which reduces the power of recoil by delaying the timing of the shot and the blowback, and blows back with the appropriate force.

The Model 1893 was considered cumbersome in terms of its handling characteristics and overall appearance. The 1893 design would be further refined by subsequent models.

== M1894 ==
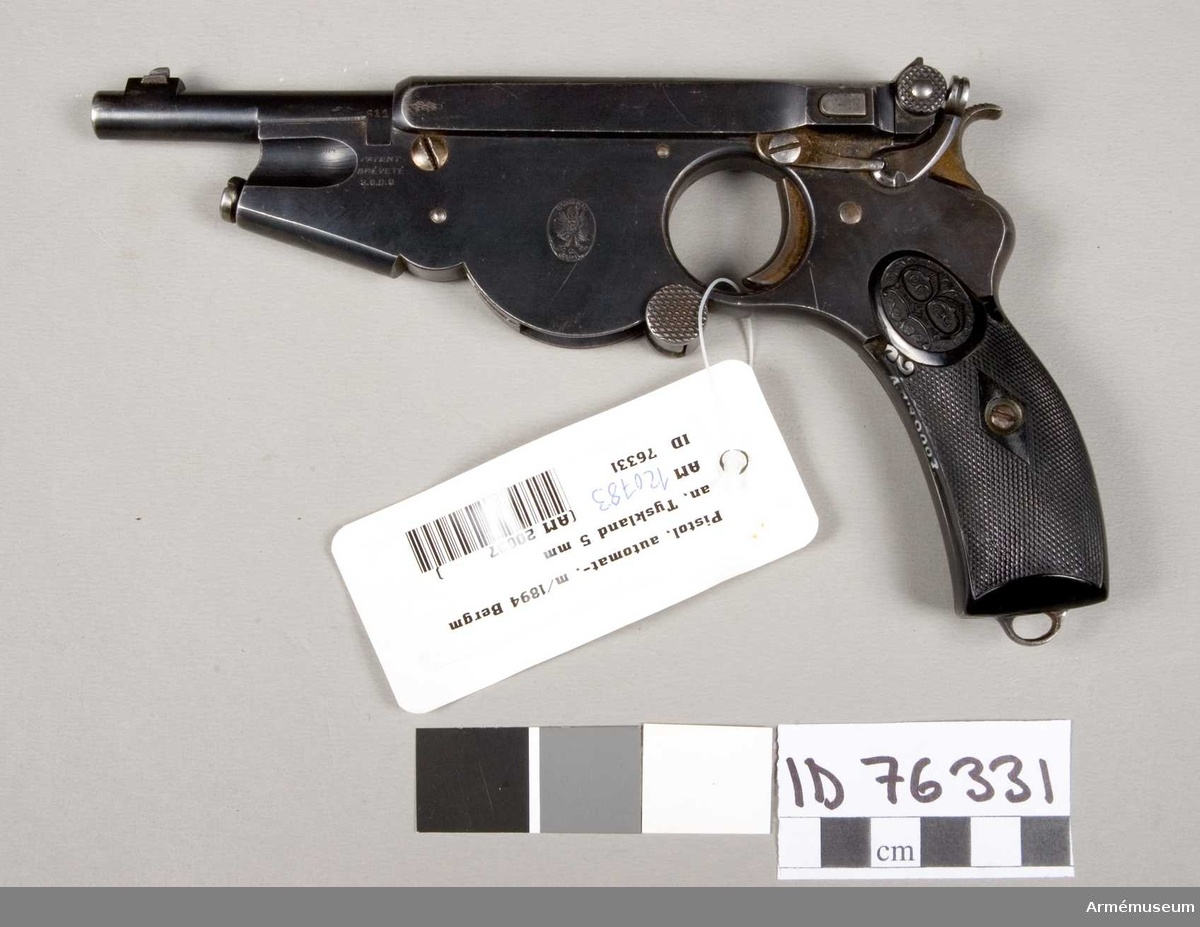
Model 1894/No.1 (5mm caliber variant) resembles the later Model 1896 pistols.

Improvement over the Model 1893, the Bergmann Model 1894, retroactively designated as No. 1, came chambered in 5mm, 6.5mm and 8mm cartridges, all which would be used by subsequent Model 1896 as well.

These pistols were built without extractors, as these cartridges were designed rimless and without extractor grooves. Instead, the cartridges had a bottleneck and a steep taper (except for the 8mm). This was said to be so that the case could be ejected by gas pressure without using an extractor (an extractor was added later). It held five rounds, and had an external exposed hammer. The chamber and hammer were separated, so it had a long firing pin.

Unlike prior M1893, the M1894 was commercially offered to buyers. Small numbers of M1894/No. 1 were ultimately made. Upon release, the Model 1894 was commercially overshadowed by the Borchardt C-93, which is why the C-93 is considered the world's first practical semi-automatic pistol.

The Bundeswehr Museum of German Defense Technology in Koblenz has one of these specimen in its collection.

== M1896 ==
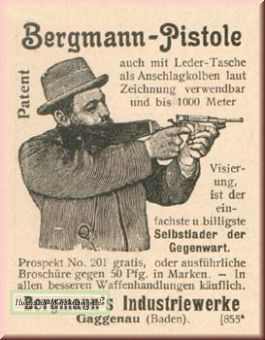
Advert for Bergmann pistol (circa 1900)

Versions designated M1893 and M1894 were evaluated and rejected by Swiss, German, and Belgian military trials; and the M1896 design reflected improvements to correct shortcomings reported by those trials. While the earlier models had been manufactured by Louis Schmeisser, the M1896 was built under license by Charles V. Schilling of Suhl.

According to John Walter, the Model 1896 became commercially available in the autumn of 1895. In comparison to its predecessor and its successor, it is the most widely produced model of this pistol family. Three cartridges were chambered for the M1896 pistols. Approximately 2,000 small pistols designated M1896 No. 2 were chambered for the 5mm Bergmann. Production of a larger pistol was approximately 4,400 M1896 No. 3 chambered for the 6.5mm Bergmann, plus two or three hundred M1896 No. 4 chambered for the 8mm Bergmann.

No. 2 variant was initially released with a folding trigger, which was located at the front of the internal magazine, in order to help with its portability in concealment. However, this variant proved to be accident prone and was disliked by its users. This resulted in Bergmann introducing a revised No. 2 variant in the summer of 1896 with a more conventional trigger layout.

According to Leonardo M. Antaris, the Model 1896 was "arguably the first commercially successful semi-automatic pistol". He cites author Geoffrey Sturgess (Note: Presumably Joachim Gortz & Dr. Geoffrey Sturgess's 2012 book "The Borchardt and Luger Automatic Pistols: A Technical History for Collectors from C93 to P. 08") in saying that "Bergmann had already sold several thousand pistols while [Borchardt C-93]'s sales were still in the hundreds."

Although the M1896 gained better visibility than prior M1894, being produced in larger numbers, the design was not without criticism. In particular, its three cartridge calibers were all deemed under-powered for combat, with the largest 8mm caliber being comparable to or slightly better than the 7.65 Browning in terms of power. Also at the time of its release, the Model 1896, as with Borchardt C-93 and other early semi-automatic pistols, was considered over-engineered and thus too elegant to be fielded in combat, which is why certain officers carried them only for show, and not for practical use.

Another major fault in the 1896 models was its ejection system, which bounced the spent round off the next round in the internal magazine. This feature would be dropped in the subsequent Bergmann pistol designs, including the Model 1897 and Bergmann Simplex.

== M1897 ==
With the commercial success of civilian sales for the M1896, Bergman made additional modifications hoping to obtain military contracts.

The Bergmann 1897, also called No. 5, was a departure from the principle of the mass-operated bolt. The weapon was a locked recoil loader, the barrel and bolt ran back together until the bolt was unlocked by swinging it sideways. It was also a sturdier design with a shrouded barrel and rear sight adjustable to 1,000 metres (1,100 yd).

The M1897 was chambered for a new 7.8mm Bergmann cartridge, which was created in response to insufficient performance of prior cartridges used both with the 1894 and the 1896. The 7.8mm Bergmann was designed in direct competition with the 7.63×25mm Mauser cartridge, used in the rival Mauser C96 pistol design. The most obvious change was a more modern detachable 10-shot magazine housed in front of the trigger. The magazine could be still fed by a stripper clip.

Most were sold with a hollow shoulder stock. A few had 12-inch (30 cm) barrels with either a conventional carbine configuration or a detachable wooden shoulder stock.

The Model 1897 was again unsuccessful in sales, with similar Mauser C96 capturing an increasing share of civilian sales. It also failed to secure any major military contracts. Approximately 800 or 1000 units were made, until the production was discontinued, with all units sold to civilian markets.

The Model 1897 was submitted the Swiss army trials for their new handgun, conducted between October 1897 to late 1899, alongside Mannlicher M1897, Roth–Theodorovic pistol, improved Mauser C96 and "improved Borchardt Pistol" (Luger P08 prototype). The Bergmann pistol, along with the Mauser C96, were outright eliminated for failing to meet the minimum standards. The competition would be won by the completed Luger P08, which would be designated as Ordonnanzpistole 1900. Bergmann built a special 10mm model for British military trials, but was also rejected.

This pistol design would be supplanted by Bergmann Simplex (1897/1901), Bergmann Mars (c.1903/1905) and the Bergmann–Bayard Model 1910 (1910).

== Pop culture ==
In the 1971 Technicolor Western film Big Jake, the character Michael McCandles (played by Christopher Mitchum), uses a Bergmann 1896 as his sidearm. It is worth noting however, that the pistol was called a Bergmann Mark 1911 in the film, and the actual prop gun was made by modifying a Walther P38 to superficially resemble a Bergmann 1896.

The blaster pistol utilized by the titular character in the 2019 television series The Mandalorian is based on the Bergmann M1894 nº 1.

The Bergmann No.3 is featured as a usable weapon in Hunt: Showdown as the "Bornheim No. 3". 4 variants exist - the pistol, a pistol with a custom 8-round fixed magazine, a long barrelled carbine with a fixed wire stock and a silenced variant.

== See also ==
- Laumann Pistol
