= 8mm Gasser =

Revolver cartridge

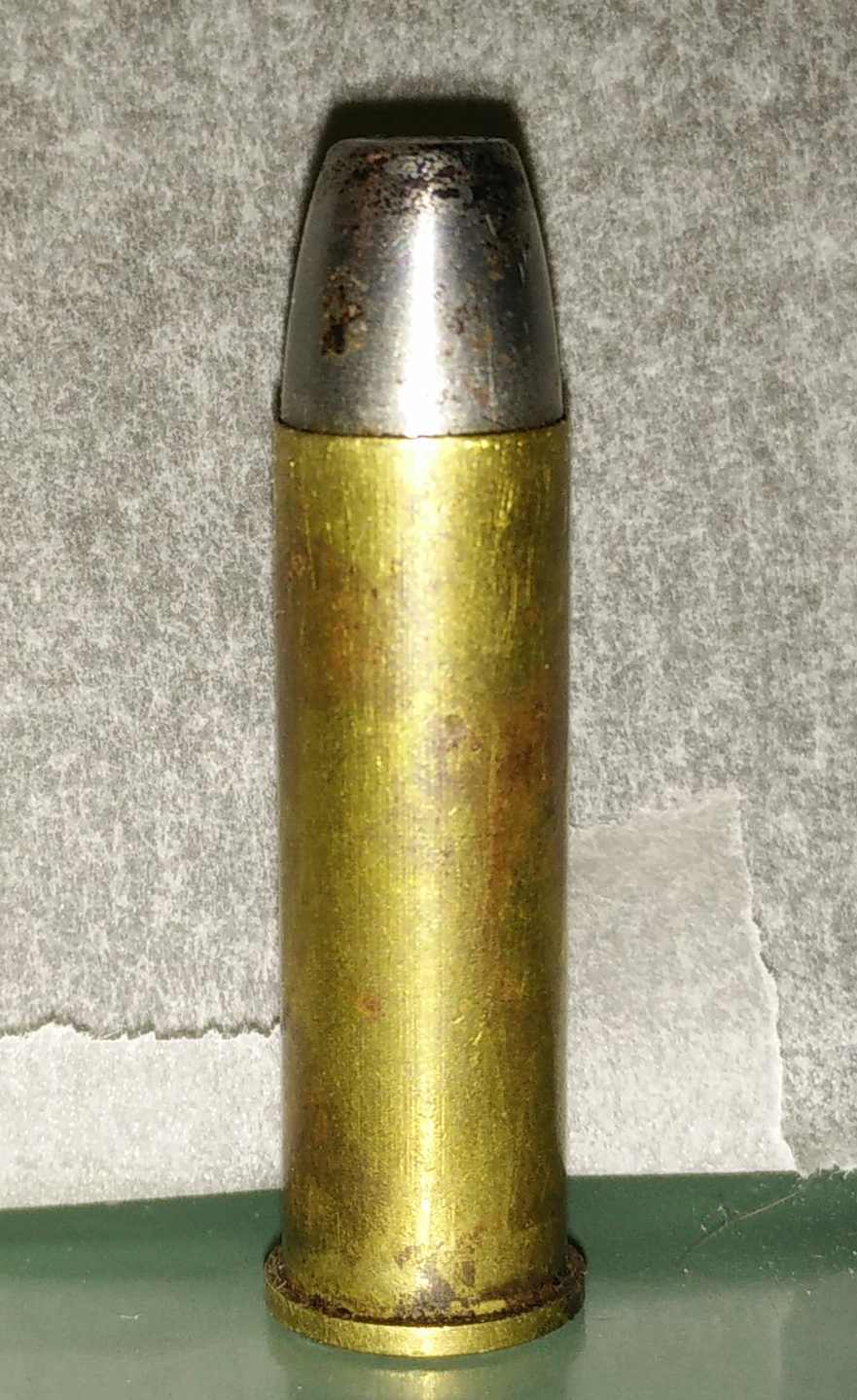
- Type: Revolver
- Place of origin: Austria-Hungary

Service history
- Used by: Austria-Hungary; Kingdom of Italy; Kingdom of Yugoslavia; First Austrian Republic; Kingdom of Hungary

Production history
- Designed: 1898
- Produced: 1898-present

Specifications
- Case type: Rimmed, straight
- Bullet diameter: 8.11 mm (0.319 in)
- Neck diameter: 8.56 mm (0.337 in)
- Base diameter: 8.60 mm (0.339 in)
- Rim diameter: 9.68 mm (0.381 in)
- Case length: 27.00 mm (1.063 in)
- Overall length: 36.00 mm (1.417 in)
- Filling: smokeless powder
- Filling weight: 0.35 g (5.4 gr)

Ballistic performance
Bullet mass/type	Velocity	Energy
125.8 gr (8 g) FMJ	240 m/s (790 ft/s)	235 J (173 ft⋅lbf)
126.1 gr (8 g) FMJ	250 m/s (820 ft/s)	255 J (188 ft⋅lbf)

The 8mm Gasser (8x27mmR) is a rimmed cartridge used in the Rast-Gasser M1898 revolver and a small number of converted Mauser C96 pistols. Its bullet is cylindro-ogival and is of the jacketed type.

== See also ==
- List of rimmed cartridges
