= Bergmann-Simplex 8mm cartridge =

Pistol cartridge

Bergmann-Simplex 8mm cartridge / 8x18mm Simplex
- Type: Pistol cartridge
- Place of origin: German Empire

The 8mm Bergman-Simplex cartridge, also known as 8mm Bergmann Nº 6 and 8x18mm Simplex, is a centerfire smokeless-powder rimless straight sided cartridge developed by Theodor Bergmann for his Simplex pistols. Original loadings of this cartridge fired a 71 grain bullet at 790 feet per second.

This is a notable cartridge because Bergmann has previously experimented with tapered bottleneck designs that had no extractor groove, as well as similar designs with an extractor groove, and this design settles on a straight side rimless design, a form most semi-automatic ammunition will take. Furthermore, 8x18 Simplex is designed with sufficient power to operate the recoil of the weapon, but to also avoid the necessity of a locked breach, simplifying construction.

The impact of this cartridge, like the more successful 7.65mm (.32 ACP) cartridge, provide a pathway to an entire class of pocket pistols that are simpler to design and manufacture, and less lethal, than the heavier energy deliveries of the locked-breach, more military style firearms.

== See also ==
- 8 mm caliber
- List of handgun cartridges
- Table of handgun and rifle cartridges
