= 6.5mm Bergmann =

German centerfire pistol cartridge

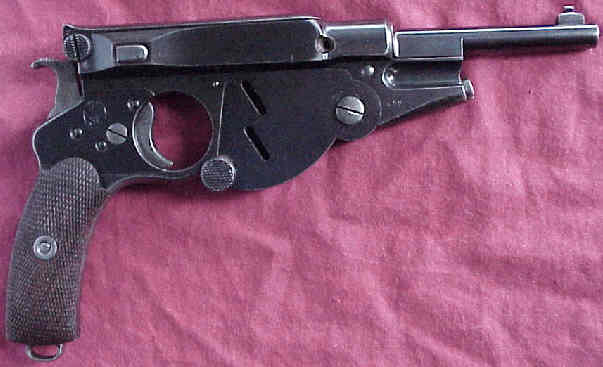
- Bergmann model 1896 in 6.5 caliber
- Type: Pistol
- Place of origin: German Empire

Production history
- Designer: Bergmann
- Produced: 1895

Specifications
- Case type: semi-rimmed
- Bullet diameter: .26 in (6.6 mm)
- Neck diameter: .285 in (7.2 mm)
- Shoulder diameter: .330 in (8.4 mm)
- Base diameter: .368 in (9.3 mm)
- Rim diameter: .372 in (9.4 mm)
- Case length: .870 in (22.1 mm)
- Overall length: 1.230 in (31.2 mm)

Ballistic performance
| Bullet mass/type | Velocity | Energy |
|---|---|---|
| 76 gr (5 g) FMJ | 710 ft/s (220 m/s) | 84 ft⋅lbf (114 J) |
- Source(s): "Textbook of Automatic Pistols"

The 6.5mm Bergmann is an unusual centerfire cartridge produced for the 1896 Bergman #3 self-loading pocket pistol.

== Design ==
The case is bottle-necked and steeply conical, and headspaces on the conical case walls. Early versions were made without any rim or extraction groove; and relied upon blow-back for expulsion of the fired case from the chamber. Later Bergmann pistols provided an extractor requiring a groove which produced a semi-rimmed case.

== See also ==
- Theodor Bergmann
- Bergmann 1896
