= Bergmann Simplex =

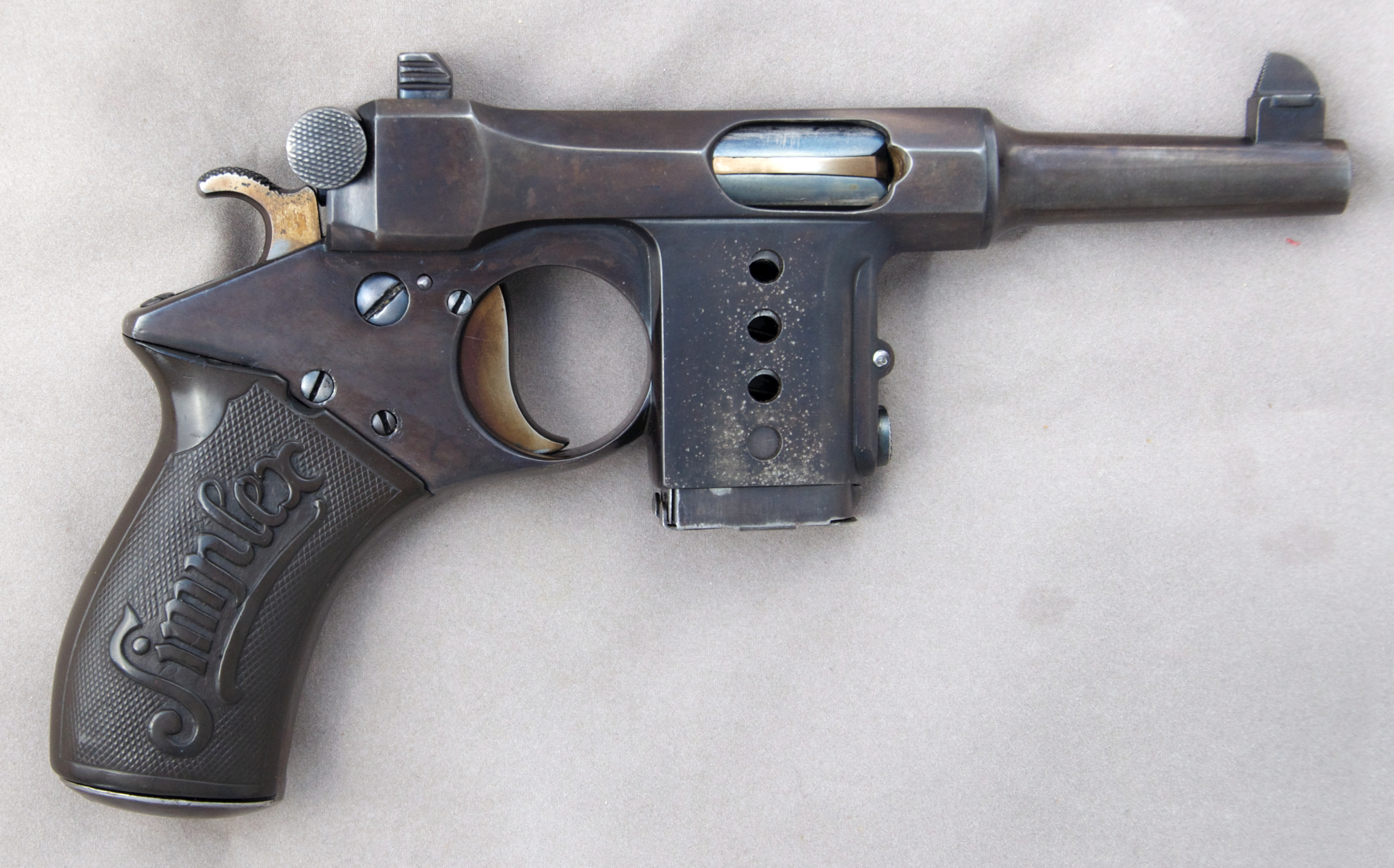
- Bergmann Simplex Model 1900 German, 8mm Bergman Simplex cartridge
- Type: Semi-automatic pistol
- Place of origin: Germany; Belgium

Production history
- Designer: Theodor Bergmann
- Designed: 1897
- Produced: c.1897-1914; introduced to markets in 1901.
- No. built: Est. 4000 or more

Specifications
- Mass: 32.0 oz (1.0 kg)
- Length: 8.5 in (217 mm)
- Cartridge: 8x18mm Simplex
- Action: blowback
- Feed system: 5- or 8- round detachable box magazine

The Bergmann Simplex was a compact semi-automatic firearm produced in the early 1900s, utilizing innovations from the earlier Bergman Model 1896 and 1897 pistols, being essentially a down-scaled version of Model 1897. It was chambered for the proprietary Bergmann-Simplex 8mm cartridge, and did not have a locked breach.

Although production began in 1897, the design itself was actually patented in 1901, with the gun beginning sales in 1901 as well. After a few copies were manufactured in Austria, its designs would be sold to an unidentified Belgian company in 1904. This Belgian company would manufacture 4,000 copies and would discontinue it, after the German aggression against Belgium in 1914.

The Simplex proved popular in Spain, to a point it prompted local gunsmiths to start making counterfeit copies of the Simplex.

The Simplex, while doing better commercially than its predecessor design, the Model 1896/1897 family, was still not a successful firearm. It was considered under-powered, cumbersome and developed a reputation for poor reliability. Additionally, it did not fare well against the other compact pistols in the market; particularly the FN-Browning designs.

== Development and construction ==
The Bergmann Simplex incorporated experience from the earlier Bergmann pistols. It is nearly identical with the Bergmann Model 1897, but is smaller in size and its original one-piece grips having the word Simplex on them.

The Bergmann Simplex was a semi-automatic weapon, operating on the principle of a free-bolt recoil. The lock consists of a simple single-action system, using hammer as a striker, without self-cocking.

The Bergmann Simplex was fed from a replaceable box magazine with a capacity of 6 or 8 rounds. The magazine was located in front of the trigger.

It fired a relatively weak 8 mm cartridge. This made it possible to construct the weapon with an unlocked bolt. Its barrel was rifled, had six right-handed grooves.

Manufacturing quality of Bergmann Simplex was lacking, with issues being found in its "soft" feeling frame, the one-piece rubber grip being fragile and the extractor and the ejector being prone to breaking.

== See also ==
- List of front-magazine pistols
- List of semi-automatic pistols
