= 5mm Bergmann =

German centerfire pistol cartridge

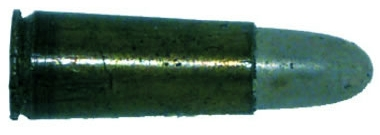
- Type: Pistol
- Place of origin: German Empire

Production history
- Designer: Bergmann
- Designed: 1894
- Produced: 1896–1900

Specifications
- Bullet diameter: .2 in (5.1 mm)

Ballistic performance
Bullet mass/type	Velocity	Energy
35 gr (2 g) FMJ	580 ft/s (180 m/s)	26 ft⋅lbf (35 J)
- Source(s): "Textbook of Automatic Pistols"

The 5mm Bergmann is an unusual centerfire cartridge produced for the 1896 Bergman #2 self-loading pocket pistol. The case is steeply conical and headspaces on the conical case walls. Early versions (sometimes called the 5 mm Bergmann Rimless) were made without any rim or extraction groove; and relied upon blow-back for expulsion of the fired case from the chamber. Later Bergmann pistols provided an extractor requiring a groove which produced a semi-rimmed case. The long bullet was inadequately stabilized and tended to tumble in flight.
