= Mauser C96 =

German semi-automatic pistol series

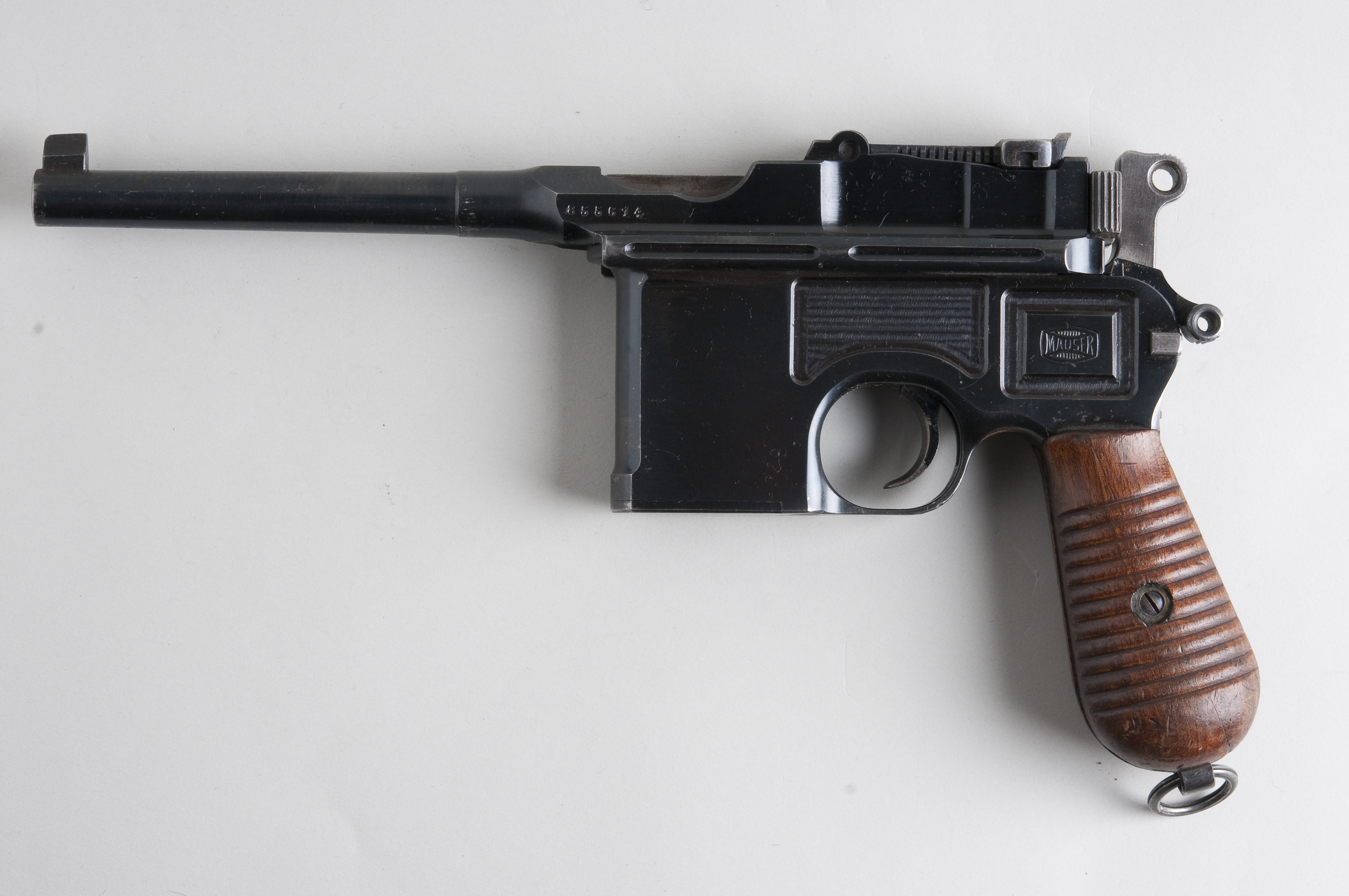
- A 7.63mm Mauser C96
- Type: Semi-automatic pistol; Machine pistol/submachine gun (M712 Schnellfeuer)
- Place of origin: German Empire

Service history
- In service: 1896–1961
- Used by: See Users
- Wars: List of wars: Mahdist War; Spanish–American War; Philippine Revolution; Second Boer War; Philippine American War; Boxer Rebellion; Russo-Japanese War; Italo-Turkish War; Xinhai Revolution; Mexican Revolution; Balkan Wars; World War I; Jungle Movement of Gilan; German Revolution; Irish War of Independence; Irish Civil War; Finnish Civil War; Russian Civil War; Easter Rising; Polish–Soviet War; Rif War; Constitutionalist Revolution; Chaco War; Spanish Civil War; Second Sino-Japanese War; World War II; Indonesian National Revolution; Chinese Civil War; First Indochina War; 1948 Palestine War; Malayan Emergency; Palestinian Fedayeen insurgency; 1958 Lebanon crisis; Korean War; Vietnam War; Lebanese Civil War; Araguaia Guerrilla War; Soviet–Afghan War

Production history
- Designer: Feederle brothers (Fidel, Friedrich, and Josef); Paul Mauser
- Designed: 1895
- Manufacturer: Mauser (Germany); Taiyuan Arsenal, Taku Naval Arsenal and Hanyang Arsenal (China); Beistegui Hermanos and Astra-Unceta y Cia SA (Spain)
- Produced: 1896–1937
- No. built: 1,100,000+
- Variants: See Major variants

Specifications
- Mass: 1.13 kg (2 lb 8 oz)
- Length: 312 mm (12.3 in) (pre-Bolo); 271 mm (10.7 in) (post-Bolo)
- Barrel length: 140 mm (5.5 in) (pre-Bolo); 99 mm (3.9 in) (post-Bolo)
- Cartridge: 7.63×25mm Mauser; 7.65×21mm Parabellum; 9×19mm Parabellum; .45 ACP; 9mm Mauser export; 8.15mm Mauser; 8mm Gasser
- Action: Short recoil
- Rate of fire: 120 rounds per minute (semi-automatic); 900-1000 rounds per minute (M712 Schnellfeuer)
- Muzzle velocity: 425 m/s (1,394 ft/s) 7.63×25mm; 350 m/s (1,148 ft/s) 9×19mm
- Effective firing range: 150–200 m (160–220 yd)
- Feed system: 10-round internal magazine fed by stripper clip; 6-round internal magazine; 10- or 20-round detachable box magazine (M712 Schnellfeuer and detachable magazine variants); 20- or 40-round magazine (prototype M1917 trench carbine)
- Sights: V-notch rear tangent sight adjustable up to 1,000 m (1,100 yd), inverted V front sight

The Mauser C96 (Construktion 96) is a semi-automatic pistol that was originally produced by German arms manufacturer Mauser from 1896 to 1937. Unlicensed copies of the gun were also manufactured in Spain and China in the first half of the 20th century.

The distinctive characteristics of the C96 are the integral box magazine in front of the trigger, the long barrel, the wooden shoulder stock, which gives it the stability of a short-barreled rifle and doubles as a holster or carrying case, and a grip shaped like the handle of a broom. The grip earned the gun the nickname "broomhandle" in the English-speaking world, and in China the C96 was nicknamed the "box cannon" (Chinese: 盒子炮; pinyin: hézipào) because of its rectangular internal magazine and because it could be holstered in its wooden box-like detachable stock.

With its long barrel and high-velocity cartridge, the Mauser C96 had superior range and better penetration than most other pistols of its era; the 7.63×25mm Mauser cartridge was the highest-velocity commercially manufactured pistol cartridge until the advent of the .357 Magnum cartridge in 1935.

Mauser manufactured approximately one million C96 pistols, while the number produced in Spain and China is large but unknown due to poor production records.

== History ==
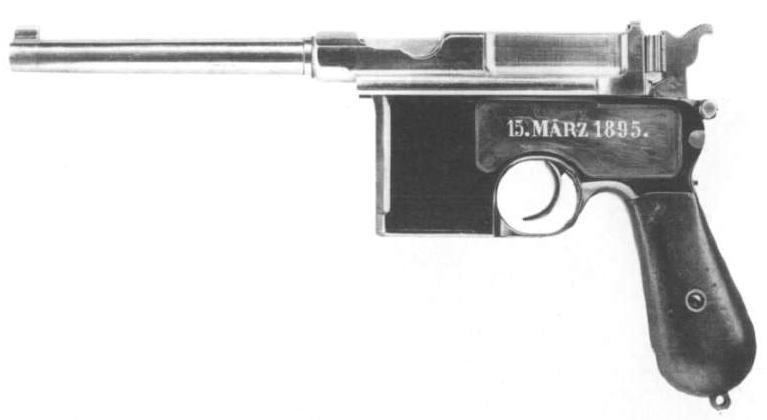
An early C96 prototype

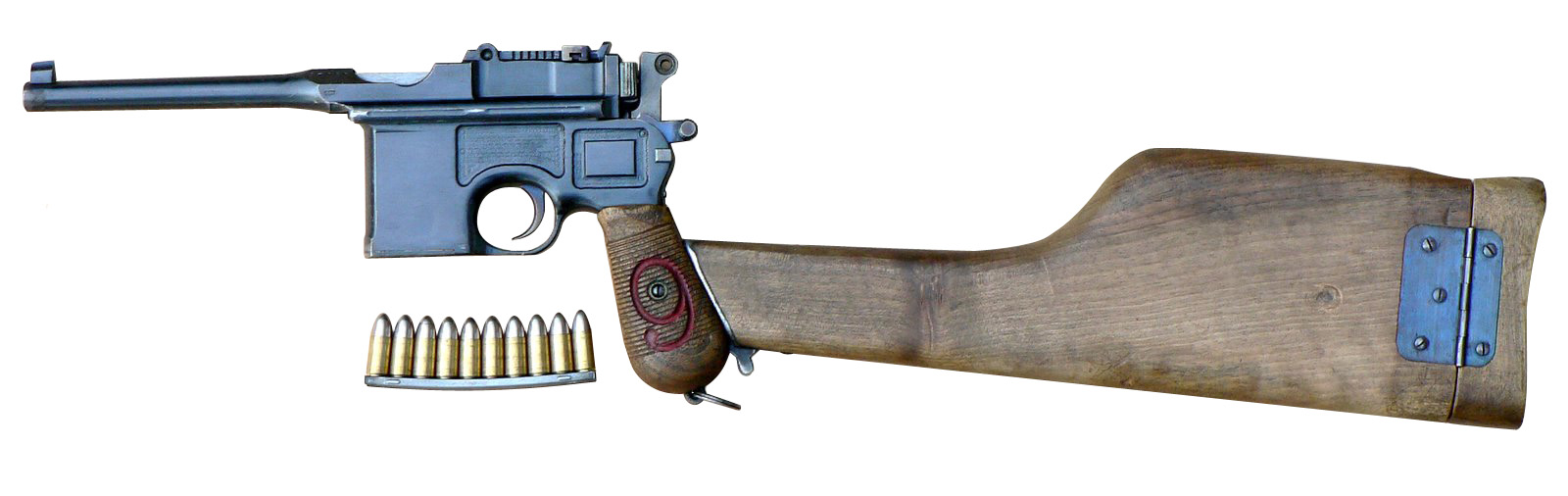
"Red 9" Mauser C96 with stock

Within a year of its introduction in 1896, the C96 had been sold to governments and commercially to civilians and individual military officers. The Mauser C96 pistol was popular with British officers (who had to purchase their own sidearms) around the turn of the 20th century. Mauser supplied the C96 to Westley Richards in the UK for resale. By the onset of World War I, however, the C96's popularity with the British military had waned.

As a military sidearm, the pistol saw service in various wars including the Easter Rising and Irish War of Independence, as well as World War I and the Irish Civil War, when the gun was nicknamed "Peter the Painter", after the contemporary Latvian anarchist of the same name (so nicknamed by the Metropolitan Police) who was believed to use this gun, and because the pistol grip looked like a brush handle. It was also used during the Estonian War of Independence, the Spanish Civil War, the Chinese Civil War, and World War II. During the Warlord Era in China, European embargoes on exporting rifles to Chinese warlords meant that the C96 became a mainstay of the period's armies, and the basic form of the pistol was extensively copied. The C96 also became a staple of Bolshevik commissars from one side and various warlords and gang leaders from another in the Russian Civil War, known simply as "the Mauser". Communist revolutionaries Yakov Yurovsky and Peter Ermakov used Mausers to execute the Russian imperial family in July 1918.

Winston Churchill was fond of the Mauser C96 and used one at the 1898 Battle of Omdurman and during the Second Boer War; Lawrence of Arabia carried a Mauser C96 for a period, during his time in the Middle East. Indian revolutionary Ram Prasad Bismil and his partymen used these Mauser pistols in the historic Kakori train robbery in August 1925. Chinese communist general, Zhu De, carried a Mauser C96 during his Nanchang Uprising and later conflicts; his gun (with his name printed on it) is in the Beijing war museum.

Three Mauser C96s were used in the killing of Spanish prime minister Eduardo Dato in 1921, and a Mauser C96 was used in the assassination of the King of Yugoslavia, Alexander I of Yugoslavia, in 1934.

Imported and domestic copies of the C96 were used extensively by the Chinese in the Second Sino-Japanese War and the Chinese Civil War, as well as by the Spanish during the Spanish Civil War and the Germans in World War II.

Besides the standard 7.63×25mm chambering, C96 pistols were also commonly chambered for 9×19mm Parabellum, with a small number also being produced in 9mm Mauser Export. In 1940, Mauser officials proposed using the C-96 as the vehicle for an upgrade to the 9×25mm Mauser Export cartridge to match the ballistics of the .357 Magnum. Lastly, there was a Chinese-manufactured model chambered for .45 ACP. Despite the pistol's worldwide popularity and fame, China was the only nation to use the C96 as the primary service pistol of its military and police.

== Contract variants ==
=== 1897 Turkish Army Mauser ===
Mauser's first military contract was with the Ottoman government in 1897. They ordered 1,000 pistols for the royal palace guards. They had their own range of serial numbers, running from 1 to 1000. They differ in that they use a Persian number system on the tangent sight and serial number, and the weapon is designated in the Muslim calendar year number system "1314" in place of the year of the Gregorian calendar "1896/1897". Markings include a six-pointed star on both sides of the chamber and the crest of Sultan Abdul Hamid II (a trophy of crossed Turkish flags, various polearms, and a collection of his royal awards and honours) and the Muslim year "1314" on the square left rear frame panel. Under the sultan's rule, there was great concern about potential military coups, and most weapons were locked away in armories, including many of the C96 pistols. After the Young Turk Revolution of 1908-1909, these pistols were issued to the army and police for service use. Some were used in combat in World War I, and after the war they were considered obsolete, being put up for sale cheaply to army or police officers. All of this meant that they saw a lot of use, much of in quite harsh conditions, and as a result few specimens survive today.

=== 1899 Italian Navy Mauser ===
In 1899, the Italian government ordered Mauser's first major military contract; an order for 5,000 C96 pistols for the Italian Royal Navy. They differ in that their receivers are "slab-sided" (i.e., lacked the milling on the sides found on commercial Mausers). They also have a "ring hammer" (spurless hammer with a hole through its head) instead of the early "cone hammer" (spurless hammer with ribbed cone-like projections on the sides of its head). These guns had their own serial number range, running from 1 to 5000.

=== 1910 Persian contract Mauser ===
The Persian government ordered 1,000 pistols. They have the Persian government's "Lion and Sun" insignia on the rectangular milled panel on the left side of the receiver and the serial numbers range from 154000 to 154999. It is often confused with the Turkish contract Mauser.

=== M1916 Austrian contract ===
Austria-Hungary ordered 50,000 Mausers in the standard 7.63×25mm. A small number were rebarreled to 8mm Gasser (8.11×27mm) for an unknown reason.

=== M1916 Prussian "Red 9" ===
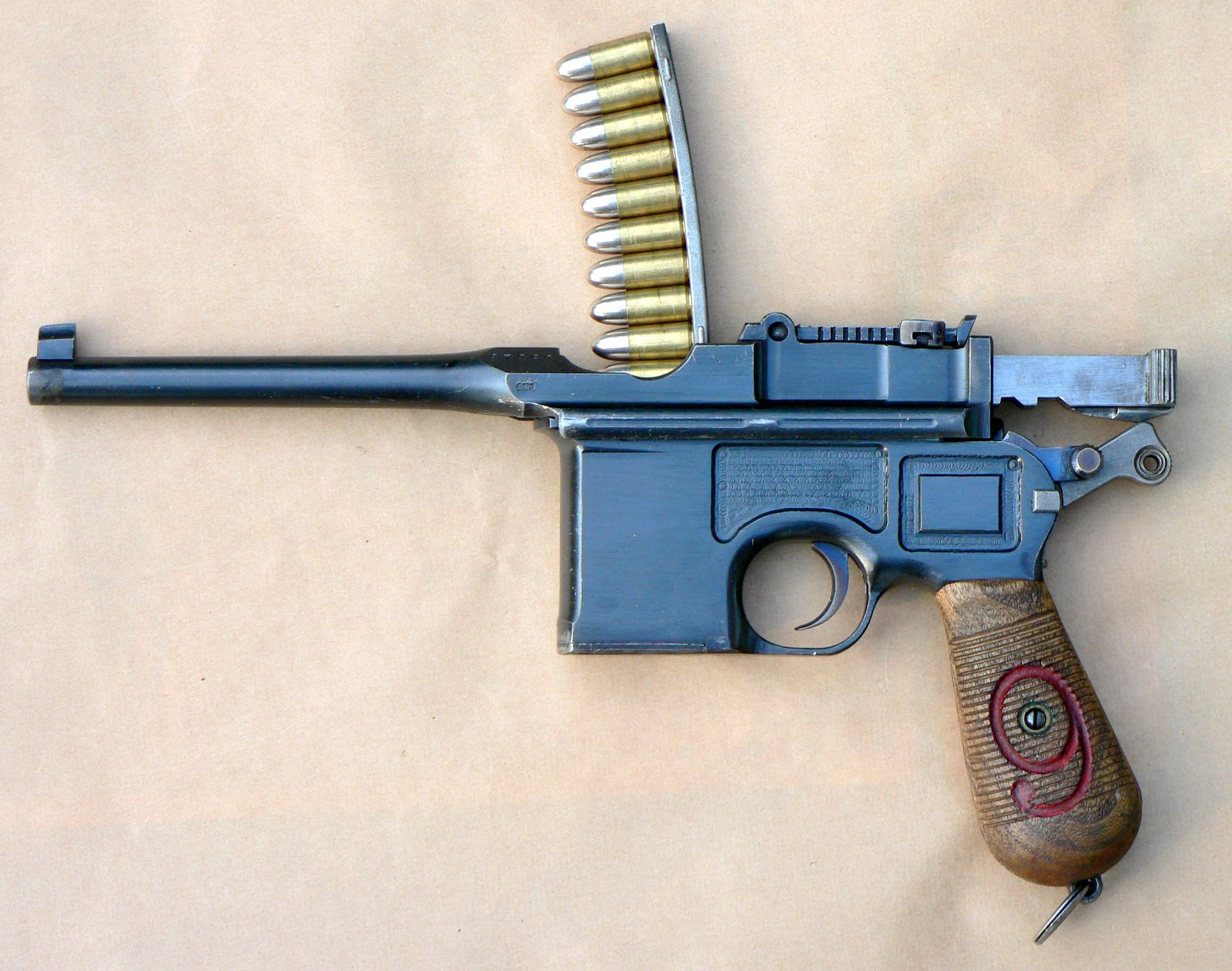
Mauser "Red 9" C96 with stripper clip

During World War I, the Imperial German Army contracted with Mauser for 150,000 C96 pistols chambered in 9mm Parabellum to offset the slow production of the standard-issue DWM P.08 pistol. They use the same clip-loaded internal box magazines as the 7.63mm Mauser and also hold ten rounds. This variant of the C96 was named the "Red 9" after a large number 9 burned into the grip panels and painted in red. (This was done to warn the pistols' users not to incorrectly load them with 7.63mm ammunition.) Because the army delegated the branding to unit armourers, not all 9mm pistols carry the nine. Of the 150,000 pistols commissioned, approximately 137,000 were delivered before the war ended. Original 9mm pistols can be told from 7.63mm-to-9mm conversions because they have 9mm-rated sights (marked "50 m-500 m") rather than 7.63mm-rated sights (marked "50 m-800 m").

=== M1920 French police contract ===
The French government set up an order for 2,000 pistols with 99-millimetre (3.9 in) barrels for the Gendarmerie Nationale. The pistol has black ebonite grips rather than wooden ones.

=== WW2 Luftwaffe contract ===
The German government purchased 7,800 commercial M1930 pistols in 1940 for use by the Luftwaffe. They have Wehrmacht proof marks and the Mauser serial numbers come from the early- to mid-1930s. The weapon had ceased production in 1937 but the order was filled from remaining stocks. According to Kersten, Moll and Schmid, these were likely purchased by the high command of the armed forces and issued to motorcycle and flak crews of the Luftwaffe.

== Major variants ==
There were many variants of the C96 besides the standard commercial model; the most common are detailed below.

=== M1896 Kavallerie Karabiner ===
One of the experimental ideas was the creation of a pistol-carbine for use by light cavalry. They had "slab-sided" receivers, standard 10-round magazines, permanently affixed wooden stocks and forends, and lengthened 300 millimetres (12 in) (early production) or 370 millimetres (15 in) (late production) barrels. They were dropped from production after 1899 due to poor sales and little military interest.

There was limited sporting interest in the carbine version and, due to small production numbers, it has become a highly prized collectable priced at about twice the value of the pistol version. Recently, replica Mauser carbines with 16-inch or longer barrels have been imported for sale in the US.

=== M1896 compact Mauser ===
A version of the Mauser pistol with a full-sized grip, six-shot internal magazine, and a 120-millimetre (4.7 in) barrel. Production was phased out by 1899.

=== M1896 officer's model ===
This is the unofficial term for a variant compact Mauser with a curved wooden or hard-rubber grip, like that of the Reichsrevolver. The name comes from the US Army designation of the Mauser pistol sent to participate in their self-loading pistol trials.

=== M1898 pistol carbine ===
This was the first model to come cut for a combination wooden stock-holster. The stock doubles as a case or holster and attaches to a slot cut in the grip frame.

=== M1912 Mauser Export model ===
This model was the first to chamber the 9×25mm Mauser Export cartridge. It was designed to appeal to the arms markets in South America and China. Mauser C96 pistols in this caliber usually have an indentation milled into the upper surface of the magazine's follower to facilitate feeding of the straight-cased 9×25mm cartridge cases. The rifling in the barrel has a unique 13:8 twist. In addition, the flat surfaces extending around the chamber are longer, to accommodate the higher pressures of the 9×25mm cartridge. Examples of Mauser C96s in this caliber are rare, but are still occasionally found on the private collector's market. The 9×25mm Mauser Export calibre receded from the market as the armaments industry reoriented itself towards military manufacture during World War I, but the round enjoyed a resurgence in popularity as a submachine gun calibre in the 1930s.

=== M1917 Mauser trench carbine ===
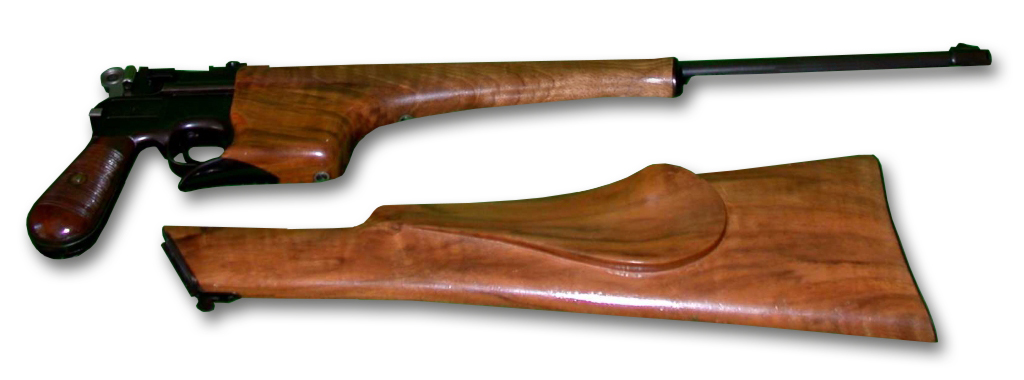
Mauser C96 Trench Carbine

This model features an extended stock and barrel similar to the M1896 Kavallerie Karabiner. It also possesses a 40-round magazine and is chambered in 9×19mm Parabellum. The M1917 Mauser trench carbine was introduced during World War I and was intended to be a cheaper replacement for the expensive Lange Pistole 08 in close-quarters combat. However, the Imperial German Army did not believe it was a cost-effective substitute, and the project was shortly abandoned with only a few ever made.

=== M1920 Mauser rework ===
The Treaty of Versailles (signed in 1919) imposed a number of restrictions on pistol barrel lengths and calibres on German arms manufacturers. Pistols for German government issue or domestic market sales could not have a barrel longer than 4 inches and could not be chambered for 9 mm cartridges.

The Weimar Republic banned the private ownership of military-issue or military-style weapons in an attempt to recover valuable arms from returning soldiers. The confiscated weapons were then used to arm government forces, leaving them with a hodge-podge of military and civilian arms. To meet the conditions of the Treaty of Versailles, a major reworking project was begun that set about converting these weapons.

To be compliant, pre-war C.96 models belonging to the Weimar government had to have their barrels cut down to 99 millimetres (3.9 in). This meant that their tangent sights had to be replaced with fixed sights. They also had to be converted to the standard 7.63×25mm Mauser round, though a few hybrid Mausers were made with salvaged Navy Luger barrels that were chambered for 7.65mm Parabellum. Compliant confiscated government-issue guns were marked M1920. This practice was continued on German service pistols even after the ban was ignored and the conversions had stopped.

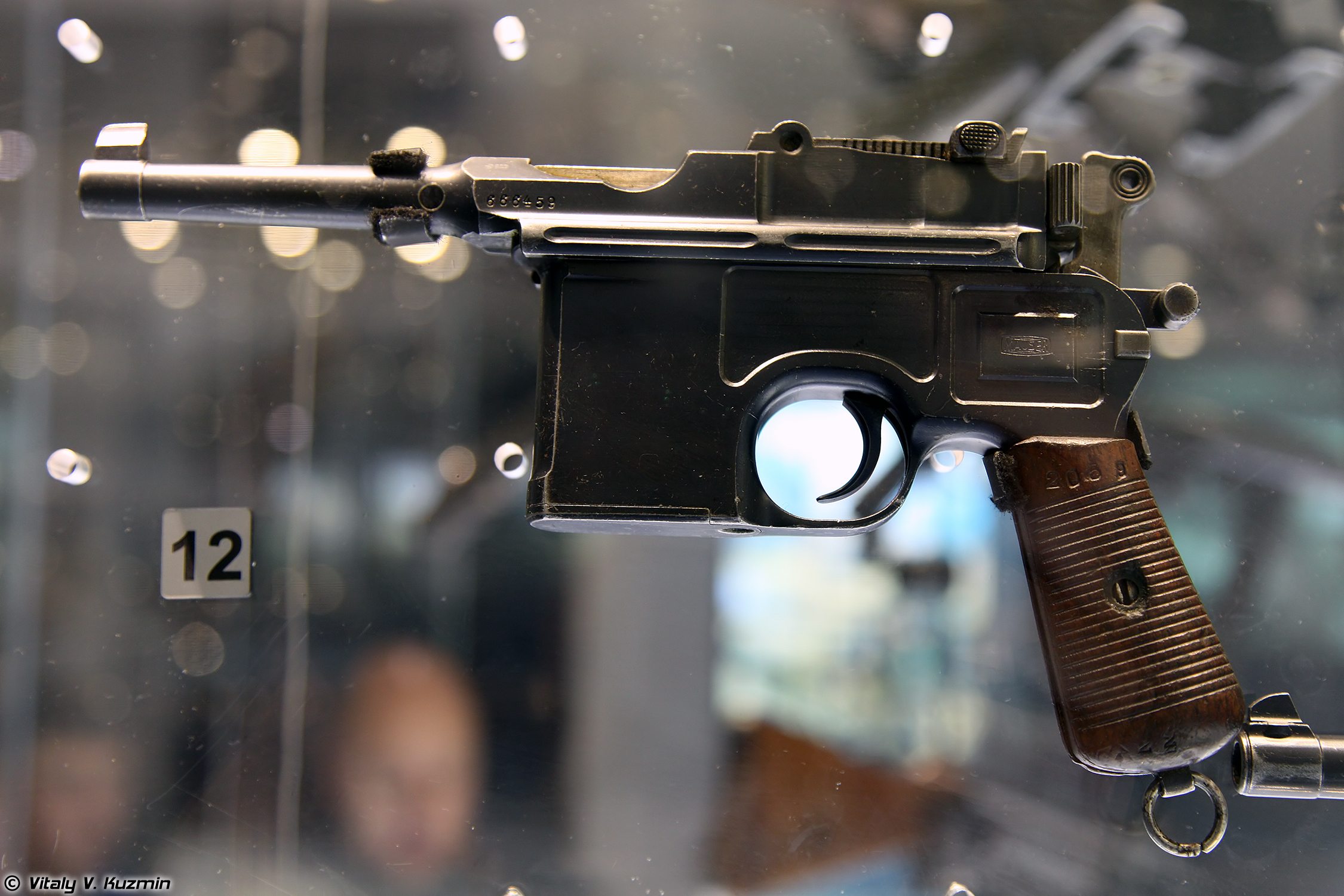
Mauser C96 M1920 Bolo in Tula State Arms Museum in 2016

=== M1921 "Bolo" Mauser ===
Mauser began manufacturing a compliant version of the C96 for commercial sale from 1920 to 1921. It featured smaller grips, a shorter 99-millimetre (3.9 in) barrel, and was chambered for the standard 7.63×25mm Mauser. An experimental 8.15×25.2mm Mauser cartridge (DWM 580) was used to replace the banned 9×19mm Parabellum and 9×25mm Mauser Export cartridges for domestic sales but it never supplanted the 9 mm calibre.

Mass-production of the weapon was from 1921 to 1930. It was sold in quantity to armies in the contested Baltic region and was carried by the Poles, Lithuanians, German Freikorps and White Russians. The Bolshevik government (and later the new Red Army) of the embryonic Soviet Union purchased large numbers of this model in the 1920s and also appropriated them from defeated enemies. The distinctive pistol became associated with the Bolsheviks and was thus nicknamed the "Bolo". The "Bolo" model was also popular elsewhere, as the shorter barrel and smaller overall size made the gun easier to conceal.

There was also a transitional version in 1930 that used the "Bolo" frame but with a longer 132-millimetre (5.2 in) barrel.

=== M1930 Mauser ===
Also known as the M30 by collectors, it was a simplification and improvement of the M1921 Mauser. It simplified production by removing several fine-machining details and reverted to the "pre-war" large grip and long barrel. The early model M30s had a 132-millimetre (5.2 in) barrel, but later models had the traditional 140-millimetre (5.5 in) barrel. It was made from 1930 until 1937.

Joseph Nickl designed a selective-fire conversion in 1930. It tended to "cook off" (fire by spontaneous ignition of the propellant when overheated) when fired in long bursts. 4,000 of this model were made between 1930 and 1931.

Since the M1932 / M712 variant was full-auto, the semi-auto M1930 it was derived from was sometimes called the M711 by war surplus dealers and collectors.

=== M1932/M712 Schnellfeuer ===
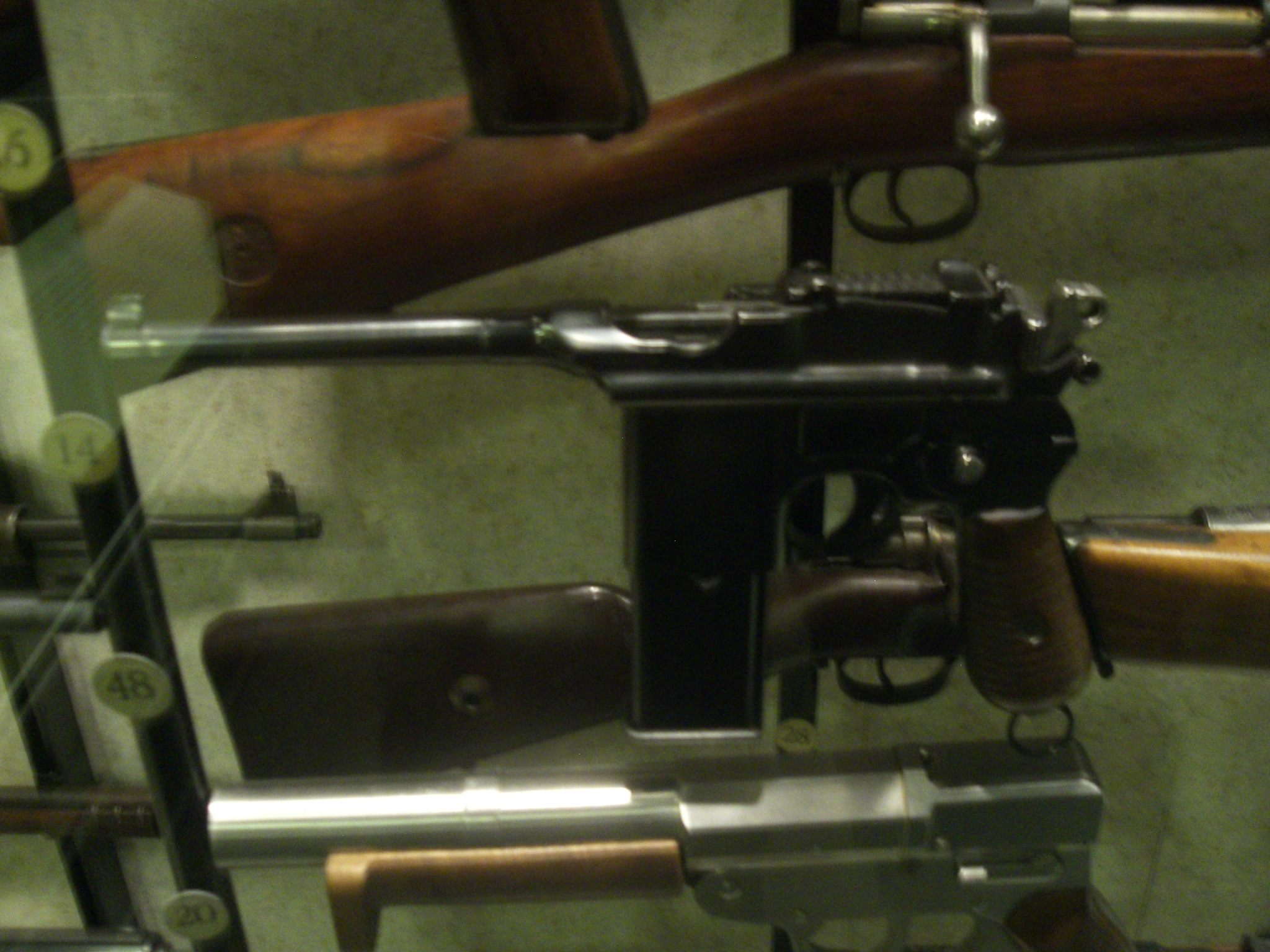
M712 Schnellfeuer at the National Firearms Museum

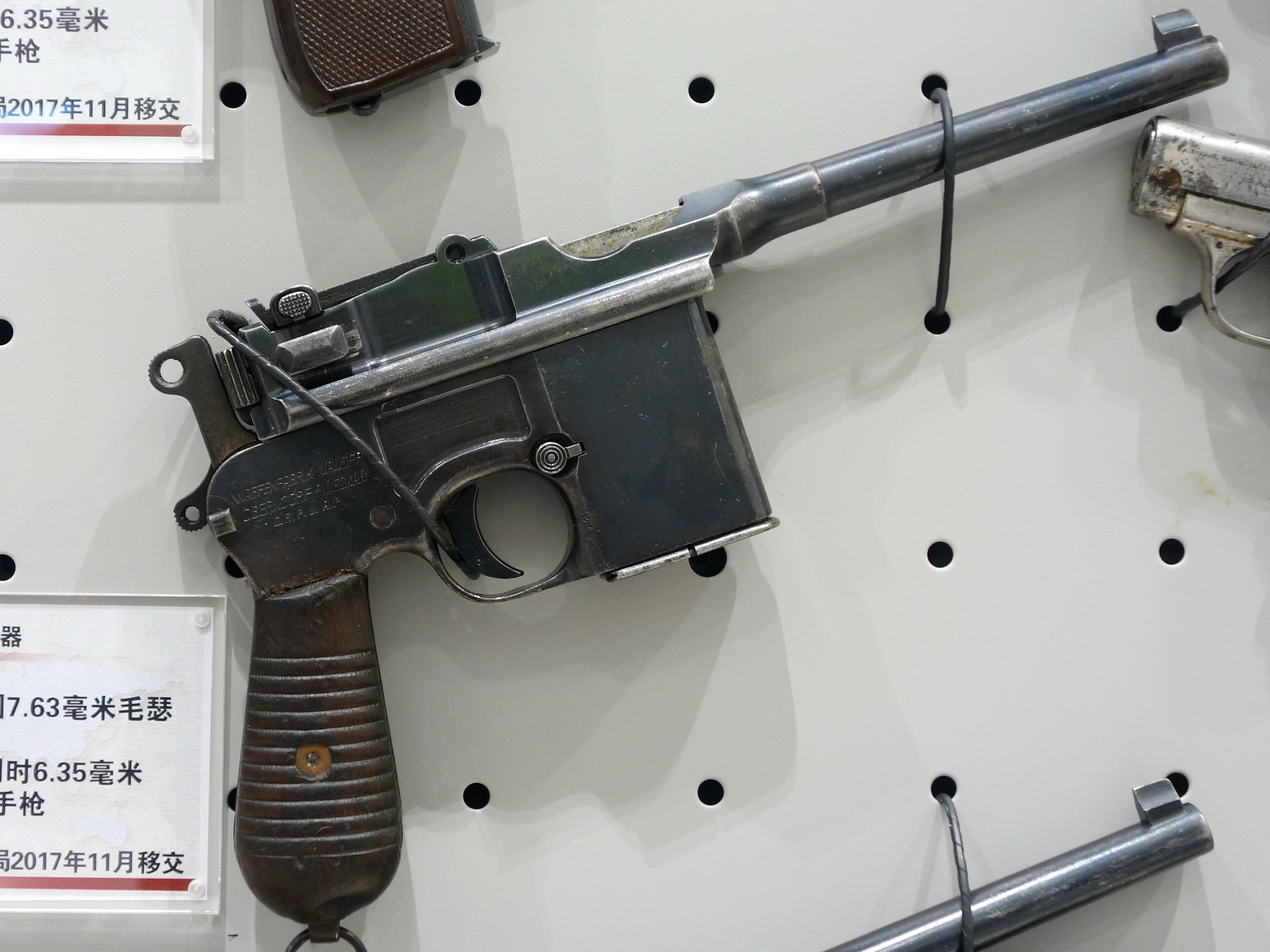
M1932

The Spanish gunmaking firms of Beistegui Hermanos and Astra began producing detachable magazine-fed, select-fire versions of the C96 in 1927 and 1928 respectively, intended for export to the Far East.

Mauser began production of the Schnellfeuer (rapid fire), their own select-fire, detachable magazine version of the M30 designed by Karl Westinger. Production started in 1932 and ended in 1936, which has led to its unofficial designation of "M1932" by collectors. An extremely successful design, around 98,000 guns were made overall and they had their own series of serial numbers.

It was largely intended for export to South America and China or to the opposing sides in the later Spanish Civil War. From 1932 to 1935, the Yugoslavian military tested batches of the Schnellfeuer in both 7.63mm and 9mm Parabellum for the purpose of arming mountain troops and special operations units. Improvements requested by the Yugoslavs included a detachable barrel, improved front and rear sights, more durable parts to prevent breakage under sustained fire and lowered position of the shoulder stock to avoid "hammer bite".

Small numbers of M1932s were supplied to the German Wehrmacht during World War II, who designated it the M712.

=== PASAM machine pistol ===
The Brazilian government bought five-hundred 7.63mm M1932 Schnellfeuer machine pistols for the Policia Militar do Distrito Federal (Portuguese: "Federal District Military Police") during the mid-1930s. The PASAM (pistola automática semi-automática Mauser, or "semi-automatic / automatic Mauser pistol") used the M1932 as its base but made a few alterations. The controls were the same as the standard model, except the markings were in Portuguese. The selector switch (found on the left side, above the trigger guard) was marked N for normal ("average", or semi-automatic) and R for rápido ("rapid", or fully automatic). The safety control lever (found to the left of the hammer) was marked S for seguro ("safe") and F for fogo ("fire'). It was used with Brazilian State Military Police (Polícia Militar) forces in the 1980s. They preferred to use it as a semi-automatic carbine and reserved its full-auto setting for emergencies due to its recoil and muzzle-climb.

In 1970, the Policia Militar do Rio de Janeiro (PMRJ) asked the services of Jener Damau Arroyo, a Spanish-born gunsmith, to make modifications on their PASAMs in order to improve their handling. The first modification (PASAM MOD-1), of which 101 were modified, received a metal frame extension welded to the magazine housing. It was fitted with a metal forward grip well ahead of the gun under the muzzle. The original grip was left alone, making it compatible with the wooden holster/stock. The second modification (PASAM MOD-2), involving 89 pistols, featured a similar frame extension, but the forward grip had wooden panels and was of a different shape. The pistol grip frame used thicker rectangular wooden grips and had a 1.5-foot (460 mm) "t-bar" metal shoulder stock welded to it. A metal frame attached to the receiver supported a rectangular wooden foregrip, taking pressure off the barrel. In both models the barrel was left free to enable its short recoil during firing. (Two hundred and ninety five PASAMs were left in the original condition). The weapon took standard detachable 10-round box magazines, although they can also take the extended 20- and 40-round magazines.

== Notable copies ==
=== Chinese C.96 (7.63mm Mauser) ===
The most common and popular pistol in China since the beginning of the Republic in 1912, was the Mauser C96, called the "Box Cannon" (盒子炮) in Chinese. It was imported from Germany and Spain (Astra 900 and MM31), but mostly produced locally in various arsenals, the larger being in Hanyang, Shanghai, Gongxian, Shanxi. They were often used with a detachable shoulder stock. Hanyang alone produced around 13,000 copies.

=== Shanxi Type 17 (.45 ACP) ===
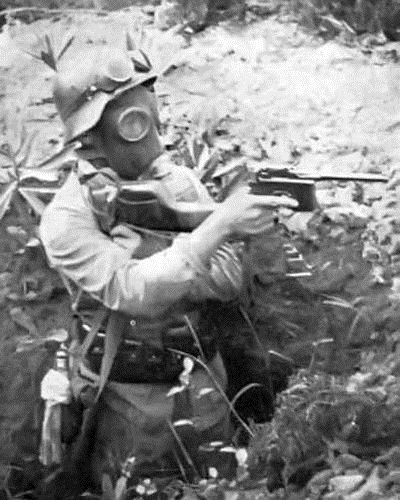
A Chinese soldier seen aiming the Shanxi Type 17

During the Warlord era of Chinese history in the early 20th century, the province of Shanxi was ruled by warlord Yan Xishan, who had established a modern arms factory in his capital city of Taiyuan. Yan was equipping his troops with a locally produced copy of the Thompson submachine gun, chambered for the .45 ACP cartridge, but was experiencing supply difficulties as his troops' sidearms were 7.63mm calibre C96 handguns.

Yan's solution was to produce a .45 ACP caliber version of the C96, thus standardizing ammunition and making supply logistics easier. Designated Type 17, production of the .45 caliber handgun began in 1928 at the Taiyuan Arsenal and ended in 1931. They are inscribed (in Chinese) "Type 17" on the left-hand side of the gun, and "Republic Year Eighteen, Made in Shansi" on the right-hand side. They were issued (along with Thompson SMGs) to railway guards in the province as a defense against bandits and other warlords.

Besides being chambered for a larger cartridge, the Shanxi .45 pistols use a noticeably larger frame than their 7.63mm counterparts, with the 10-round magazine extending below the trigger guard and a 140 mm (5.5 in) barrel. It was loaded using two five-round stripper clips rather than the single 10-round stripper clips of the standard 7.63mm Mauser. Because of the overall increase in size, Type 17 pistols share no interchangeable parts with any other C96 variant.

Most of the Shanxi .45 pistols were melted down after the communist victory in the Chinese Civil War, largely due to their odd caliber for Chinese communist standards, but a few examples were exported overseas for sale on the commercial market. Approximately 8,500 Shanxi .45 caliber broomhandle pistols are believed to have been produced by the Taiyuan Arsenal, but there is some debate as to how many of the Shanxi .45 calibre broomhandle pistols currently on the commercial market were actually produced for Yan's troops, and how many are more recent productions for the US collectors' market.

=== ETAI / Royal Model H ===
Produced by Beistegui Hermanos in Eibar, Spain, this was the first pseudo-Mauser on the market, a relatively crude semi-auto appearing in 1926 and full-auto variants appearing in 1927. Mechanically, it was laid out approximately like the Mauser original, but without the removable lock frame. Internal parts (trigger, hammer, safety lever, etc.) pivoted on pins and screws extending through the frame. The screws also held the frame together. The bolt was of round cross-section, unlike the square Mauser bolt. The weapon was stamped with either "Royal" or "ETAI".

Clones were made in China.

=== Royal MM31 (Model 1) ===
Beistigui introduced an improved version of the Model H as the MM31 – the Modelo Military 1931. It included a number of improvements. A 20-round fixed magazine version was quickly introduced, followed by a detachable magazine version, to address the issues inherent to a gun with a 10-round magazine and a 900 rounds per minute rate of fire.

=== Royal MM31 (Model 2) ===
This was a much closer copy of the Mauser original than the ETAI/Royal model and variants, with the full separate lock frame. It is of much better quality than the earlier gun, though still not at Mauser level. The MM31 was manufactured until 1934. A total of about 10,000 were made, in perhaps four successive variants. These models came in semi-auto and semi-auto/full auto selective fire variants.

=== Royal MM34 ===
This model is much like the MM31, but adds a mechanical rate reducer inside the grip area and a three-position lever to select the firing rate. It also has a ribbed barrel to help prevent overheating during sustained full auto fire. Only a few hundred of these weapons were made and are very rare today.

=== Azul and Super Azul ===
The Azul and Super Azul pistols were also manufactured by Beistegui Hermanos in Eibar, Spain, but sold by Eulogio Arostegui. The Azul was a copy of the standard C96 while the Super Azul is a semi auto/full auto select fire variant. Each accept detachable box magazines instead of having an internal box magazine.

=== Federal Ordnance M713 and M714 ===
In the late 1980s to the early 1990s, the Federal Ordnance firearms company in South El Monte, California, made reproductions of the Mauser 1917 trench carbine and C96 pistol, named the M713 and M714 respectively.

The M713 came in a standard variant with a fixed stock and magazine, as well as a "deluxe" variant which has a detachable stock and detachable box magazines. The M714 supports detachable box magazines, unlike the original C96, and a "Bolo" variant, with the "Bolo" model having a shorter barrel and grip. All variants of the M713 and M714 were available in 7.63×25mm and 9×19mm ammunition.

== Users ==
- Argentina: Issued to police
- Austria-Hungary: 50,000 commercial model pistols were imported from Germany during World War I, most of them in 1916
- Austria: Used in the First Austrian Republic.
- Bolivia: Carried by officers in the Chaco War
- Brazil: The Federal District police acquired some C96 pistols at the beginning of the 20th century. in 1930 the Federal District police ordered 500 M1932 pistols a number of which were also bought by the São Paulo Public Force. Some police forces acquired Royal MM34 pistols. Two Royal machine-pistols with 15 round magazines were used by the Alagoas police in the raid that killed Lampião. By 1971 the Sergipe State Military Police had 5 7.63 Royal machine pistols in their inventory. The Brazilian President Washington Luiz owned a gold copy, which is now part of the collection of the Museu da República, in Rio de Janeiro.
- Czechoslovakia: The C96 was among the assortment of handguns in use after the declaration of independence in 1919
- Ethiopia: A number of pistols were purchased for the bodyguard of Emperor Haile Selassie
- Empire of Japan: Used by police in Korea and the Kwantung Army; in 1941 it was introduced to home guard units. Mauser and Astra pistols were captured from the Chinese.
- Finland: 1,000 delivered by Germany to the Jaeger Movement and later the Finnish White army. In 1919 multiple C96 pistols were ordered, including some in 7.65. By the time of the Second World War there were 614 pistols remaining (343 in 9mm and 271 pistols in 7.63) those were used mostly by the civil guard and rear echelon troops. The C96 was also used by policemen and some members of Lotta Svärd.
- French Third Republic: 2,000 were bought and issued to Gendarmerie in occupied German territory after World War I
- German Empire: Privately purchased by officers serving in the military and in colonial police forces. The Army issued 137,000 of the "Red 9" variant during World War I.
- Indonesia: Were used during Indonesian National Revolution
- Iran: A thousand were bought around 1911
- Irish Free State: 295 reported in service in late 1940
- Israel: A number of C96 pistols were at the disposal of the Jewish militias in Palestine before the formation of the state of Israel, they were also used by the Haganah during the war for independence remaining in service at least until the spring of 1950. The Schnellfeuer variant was also in use.
- Kingdom of Italy: 5,000 slabside C96 pistols bought from Germany in 1899 for the navy. During World War I, those were also issued to the air force. 700 commercial model pistols were captured from an Austrian ship.
- Latvia: Some used by Latvian police until the 1930s, gradually replaced by the Walther PP. A small number were also used by the Latvian Army (around 65 by April 1936.
- Manchukuo
- Mexico: A small number of pistols was supplied to the Mexican Government between 1898 and 1900 Also privately purchased by officers
- Nazi Germany: 19,000 were issue to the regular army in 1942, the Schnellfeuer variant was issued to reconnaissance units of the Totenkopf Division and the Wehrmacht, 8,000 were also issued to the Luftwaffe during World War II. Also bought thousands of the Spanish-made Astra Model 900, 902 and 904 variants.
- Netherlands: Purchased by KNIL in the late 1930s
- Norway: M1930 model
- Ottoman Empire: 1,000 ordered from Germany in 1896
- Qing Empire
- Republic of China (1912–1949): Hundreds of thousands were used by Kuomintang, communist, and warlord forces.
- Russian Empire: In 1908, officers were authorized to purchase the pistol and it became a popular sidearm. It was issued to aviators since 1909, and in 1915 to vehicle drivers and military personnel in some other specialized roles. The C96 was also used by police agencies. A small number of guns were captured from German shipments in Finland and issued to Gendarmes. During the Russian Civil War, large amounts of ''Bolo'' pistols were ordered by White Guards.
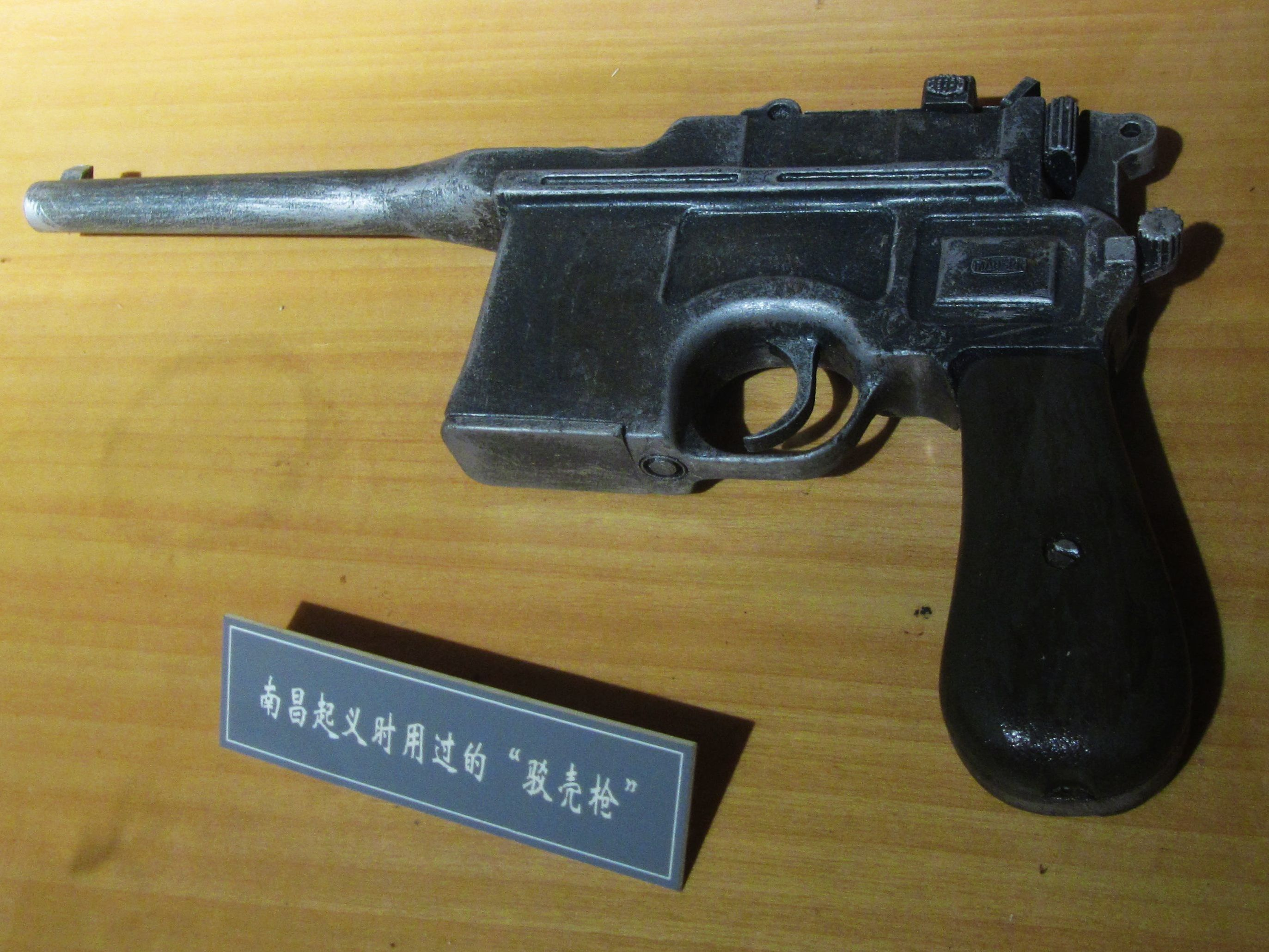
  A replica of the Mauser C96 used by Chinese forces during the Nanchang uprising
- Kingdom of Spain: Carried by some officers in Cuba during the Spanish American War. C96 pistols and local copies were issued to officers in the Rif War.
- Second Spanish Republic
- Serbia: Received a number of pistols as reparations from Germany and Austria after World War I
- Shanghai International Settlement: M1930 model bought by police
- South African Republic: 100 were bought after a Portuguese firm in Mozambique provided Piet Joubert with samples. Additionally, a number were privately purchased by burghers.
- Soviet Union: Used during the Russian Civil War (Mostly 7.63-mm model 1912). 'Bolo' Mausers were captured from White Guards and after the end of the war, about 30 thousand more such pistols chambered for 7.63 × 25 mm Mauser were ordered in Germany. These remained in service with the command staff of the Red Army at least until the end of 1939. During the Winter war, those pistols were issued to ski reconnaissance groups of the Red Army. After Nazi Germany declared war on the Soviet Union, a number of pistols were transferred to the armament of the Soviet partisans, and issued to the commanders of a number of partisan detachments.
- Rattanakosin Kingdom: Small number of 7.63 pistols purchased in 1908
- Turkey: Model 1930
- Ukraine: As of 2011, 150 7.63 pistols were stored in Ministry of Defense warehouses.
- United Kingdom: Many were privately bought by British officers before World War I
- United States: Privately purchased guns in use with Texas Rangers, Bounty Hunters and some Sheriff departments. Many were also war trophies from veterans of the First and Second World Wars.
- North Vietnam: Soviet Union lent or captured by French Forces in Indochina.
- Weimar Republic: Used by police forces and Reichswehr officers
- Kingdom of Yugoslavia: M1932 adopted by police

=== Non-state actors ===
- Irish Republican Army
- Italian Partisans
- Malayan Communist Party: Small numbers were donated by the Soviet Union.
- Communist Party of Brazil: Royal machine pistol used in the Araguaia.
- Finnish Independence Movement: Small numbers were smuggled in before World War I, including some 300 pistols on the SS John Grafton.
- Finnish Red Guards: Small numbers were obtained from intercepted German shipments during the civil war.

== Cultural significance ==
The broomhandle Mauser is a popular collector's gun. It was popularized in Soviet films as the iconic weapon of the Russian revolution and civil war. The C96 frequently appears as a "foreign" or "exotic" pistol in a number of films (such as The Great Silence, where Jean-Louis Trintignant's use of the C96 intentionally contrasts with the Colt Single Action Army revolvers used by the other characters in the film) and TV shows, owing to its distinctive and instantly recognizable shape.

Ian Fleming outfitted agents of SMERSH in the James Bond series with Mausers on the advice of firearms expert Geoffrey Boothroyd. The C96 was the inspiration for the Buck Rogers Atomic Pistol in the movie serial and the comic, and a popular toy version was produced in 1934 by the Daisy Manufacturing Company. The Japanese toy maker Epoch Co. created a dedicated video game console in 1977, the TV Game System 10, which includes as a light gun a plastic replica of a Mauser C96; the C96 replica was also usable with its next console, the Epoch Cassette Vision, created in 1981. The C96 was used by Vlado Chernozemski to assassinate the Yugoslav king, Alexander I, in Marseille in 1934.

A C96 was modified to form Han Solo's prop blaster pistol for the Star Wars films (under the name BlasTech DL-44 heavy blaster pistol). Han Solo's Star Wars blaster was created from a Mauser C96 pistol with a shortened barrel fitted with a MG81 flash hider and a Hensoldt-Wetzlar scope. Reproductions of the blaster became so popular in the cosplay community that gun collectors became aware that fans were buying and altering increasingly rare original Mausers to make blaster replicas.

== See also ==
- Bergmann–Bayard pistol – a similar German designed semi-automatic pistol produced under license in Belgium.

== Bibliography ==
- Skennerton, Ian (2005). Mauser Model 1896 Pistol. Gold Coast, QLD (Australia): Arms & Militaria Press. ISBN 0-949749-77-X.
- Wilson, Royce (January 2009). "Mauser C96 Broomhandle". Australian and New Zealand Handgun.
- Bishop, Chris, ed. (1998). Guns in Combat. Kent (UK): Grange Books. ISBN 1-84013-083-0.
- Maze, Robert J. (2002). Howdah to High Power: A Century of Breechloading Service Pistols (1867–1967). Tucson, Ariz. (USA): Excalibur Publications. ISBN 1-880677-17-2.
- Breathed Jr., John W.; Schroeder Jr., Joseph J. (1967). System Mauser – A Pictorial History of the Model 1896 Self-Loading Pistol. Handgun Press.
- Belford, James N.; Dunlap, Jack (1969). The Mauser Self-Loading Pistol. Borden Publishing Cie.
- Hogg, Ian V., ed. (1987). Jane's Infantry Weapons 1987–1988. Jane's Publishing Group.
- Berger, Robert J. (1985). Know Your Broomhandle Mausers. Blacksmith Corp. ISBN 978-0941540094.
