= Collaborationist Chinese Army =

1937–1945 pro-Japanese military forces

- Flag of Wang Jingwei regime (1940–1943)
- Active: 1937–1945
- Country: Republic of China → Provisional Government → Reformed Government → Wang Jingwei regime
- Allegiance: Empire of Japan
- Size: 300,000–683,000 troops
- Colors: Blue, red, and white
- Engagements: Second Sino-Japanese War; World War II

Commanders
- Ceremonial chief: President Wang Jingwei
- Notable commanders: Ren Yuandao; Xiao Shuxuan; Bao Wenyue; Yang Kuiyi; Ye Peng; Sun Dianying

Insignia
- Roundel

The term Collaborationist Chinese Army refers to the military forces of the puppet governments founded by the Empire of Japan in mainland China during the Second Sino-Japanese War and World War II. They include the armies of the Provisional (1937–1940), Reformed (1938–1940), and Wang Jingwei regime (1940–1945), which absorbed the former two regimes.

Those forces were commonly known as puppet troops but went under different names during their history depending on the specific unit and allegiance, such as Nanjing Army. In total, it was estimated that all pro-Japanese collaborationist Chinese forces combined had a strength of around 683,000. After the Second Sino-Japanese War, a total of 1,462,685 Chinese collaborationist troops surrendered to Kuomintang forces along with 1,283,240 troops of the Imperial Japanese Armed Forces.

== Provisional Government ==
Originally, the Japanese did not allow Wang Kemin's Provisional Government of the Republic of China to have an army of its own and instead relied on a police force of 5,000 men for security. In May 1938 steps were taken towards forming an actual army for his government by opening a military academy in Beijing, with an initial intake of a hundred cadets for a one-year course. In February 1939, a Training School was opened for non-commissioned officers with one thousand cadets undergoing a six-month course. The target strength the Provisional Government wanted to reach was 13,200 men divided into 8 infantry regiments, with six of them being formed into brigades, commanded by a Chinese major general and a Japanese advisor. Along with graduates of the academies, who were given the rank of lieutenant or second lieutenant, there were also former Nationalist and warlord officers. In addition, there was also a 400-man bodyguard unit for Wang.

The Provisional Government Army's order of battle was as follows:

- 1st Brigade 'Beijing' (Maj. Gen. Liu Fengzhi)
  - 1st Regiment (Peking)
  - 2nd Regiment (Tongzhou)
- 2nd Brigade 'Baoding' (Maj. Gen. Huang Nanbeng)
  - 3rd Regiment (Paotingfu)
  - 4th Regiment (Chengtingfu)
- 3rd Brigade 'Kaiping' (Maj. Gen. Lu Zhensheng)
  - 5th Regiment (Kaiping)
  - 6th Regiment (Tangshan)
- 7th Independent Regiment 'Tianjin' (Col. Sun Zhizhang)
- 8th Independent Regiment 'Jinan' (Col. Ma Wenzhi)

== Reformed Government ==
Reformed Government troops undergoing training with Hanyang 88 rifles under a Japanese instructor

The poorly-organized Reformed Government of the Republic of China, which managed the occupied zones in central China, raised a minimal armed force of generally poor quality. In December 1938, Pacification Minister Ren Yuandao announced that the army consisted of 10,000 troops. A military academy was established with 320 cadets between the ages of eighteen and twenty-five, with the intent of creating a new officer class "untainted" by prior service in the Nationalist Army and loyal to the Reformed Government. The year-long training course was given by Japanese officers. However, their training was cut short as the expanded army, which numbered 30,000 men by November 1939, needed officers. Its quality was low, as reports indicated that Reformed Government troops fled from guerillas that they engaged.

The Reformed Government Army was initially organized as follows:

- 1st Pacification District – Zhejiang and Jiangxi provinces
- 2nd, 3rd, and 4th Pacification Districts – regions south of Yangtze River
- 5th Pacification District – regions north of the Yangtze River

In addition, a 'water patrol corps' was created in June 1939 to police the coastline and inland waterways. It was commanded by Vice Admiral Xu Jianding, the former commander of the Nationalist navy's Yangtze Squadron. A water police training school was established with 150 cadets trained by 30 Japanese and 30 Chinese instructors. However, it had few vessels to carry out its duty with. There were also plans to form an air force and several training gliders were purchased from Japan, but these plans never came to fruition by the time the Reformed Government was merged with the newly-formed Reorganized National Government of China as the Nanjing Army in 1940.

== Nanjing Government ==
=== Army ===
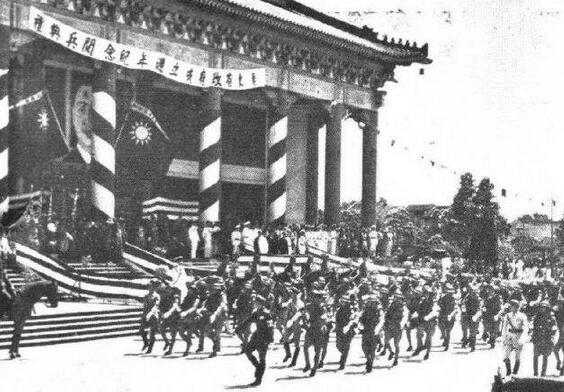
Soldiers during the first anniversary parade of the founding of the Nanjing government, 1941

During its existence, the Reorganized National Government of the Republic of China fielded a force that was estimated by Western sources to have been between 300,000 and 500,000 strong. Wang Jingwei initially planned to raise a force of twelve divisions under his personal command, although most Nanjing Government troops were only under his nominal control throughout the war. All military matters were theoretically managed by the Central Military Commission, but in reality the body was largely symbolic and had little authority. The Nanjing Army commanders were able to operate without much interference from Wang's government and in many cases were former warlords or officers of Chiang Kai-shek's Nationalist Army. Wang initially recruited his troops from former Nationalist soldiers and the collaborationist troops that had previously served the Provisional and Reformed Governments, which were both united under Wang's command. In the "Japan–China Military Affairs Agreement" signed by Japan and the Reorganized National Government, the Japanese agreed to train and equip an unspecified number of divisions for the Nanjing Army. They were provided with mostly captured Nationalist equipment along with small amounts of Japanese weapons.

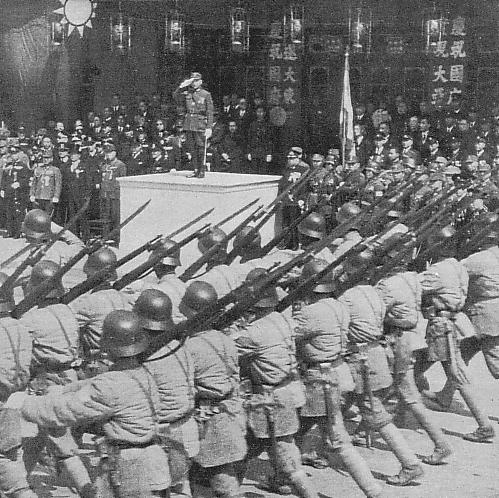
Soldiers during the third anniversary parade of the founding of the Nanjing government, 1943

Their Japanese advisors viewed the army as a strictly infantry force, providing it only with minimal artillery and armor, and what little they did receive was mostly used by Wang's three Capital Guard divisions. The main type of artillery in use by the Nanjing Army were medium mortars, with 31 field guns (including Model 1917 mountain guns) being in use by the Guards divisions. The Japanese provided 18 Type 94 tankettes in 1941 so that the Wang Jingwei regime would have at least a token armored force. Records indicate that the Nanjing Army was also given 20 armored cars and 24 motorcycles. Since there were few factories in the Nanjing Government's territory, it had to rely on weapons captured from Nationalist troops and those provided by Japan. Due to this the quality and quantity of small arms used by the Nanjing Army varied greatly. Two of the most widely used rifles were the Chinese version of the Karabiner 98k and the Hanyang 88, though various other kinds also found their way to the army. In 1941 the Japanese sold some 15,000 captured Carcano rifles and 30,000 new Arisaka rifles which were issued to the best Nanjing Army units. Various machine gun models were also used, including the Czech ZB-26 light machine gun and Type 3 heavy machine gun. Even when Nanjing troops were decently armed, the amount of ammunition they received was limited, but later in the war the Nanjing regime was producing some equipment in its own factories.

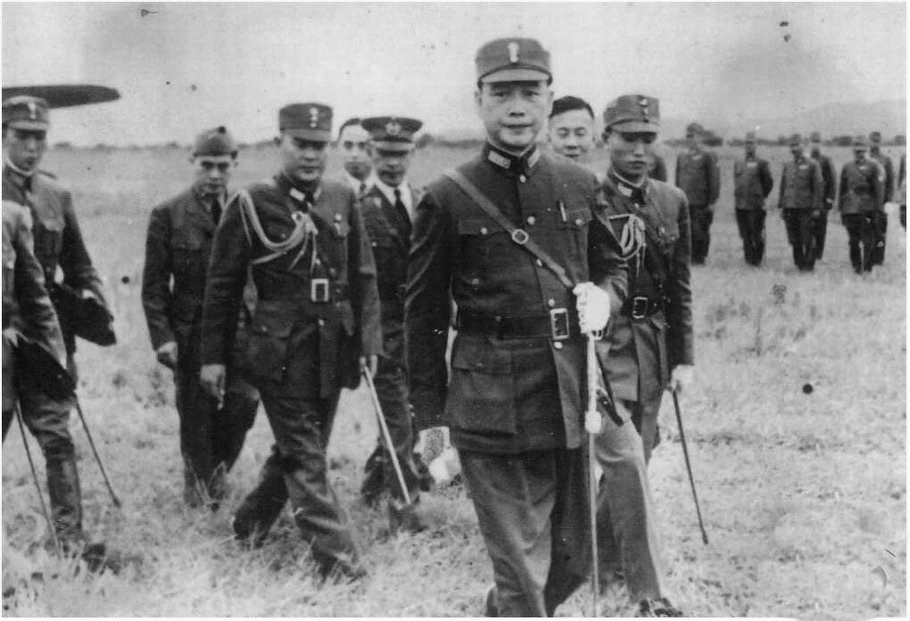
Wang Jingwei with army officers

Among those targeted for recruitment by the Nanjing Nationalist Government and Japanese were former warlord officers of the 1911–1928 period. Due to the personal loyalty of Chinese troops to their commanders, several Nationalist Chinese generals that defected brought their armies over with them. Many Nationalist units defected on orders of Chiang Kai-shek in order to preserve them for the later war against the Chinese Communists that he knew he would fight after Japan's defeat. As a result, the Nanjing Army was never fully trusted due to its suspect loyalties and therefore received limited heavy weapons, but the worsening war situation for Japan meant that they had to rely on it more often and thus Nanjing units were granted better equipment. These troops were mostly used for defending important locations and for combating Communist partisans. In addition, many local irregular units were raised as well, including militias, volunteer and rural guards, which were mainly formed in order to counter guerrilla fighters. However, their quality was very low due to their limited training and lack of arms, and they were regarded as unreliable.

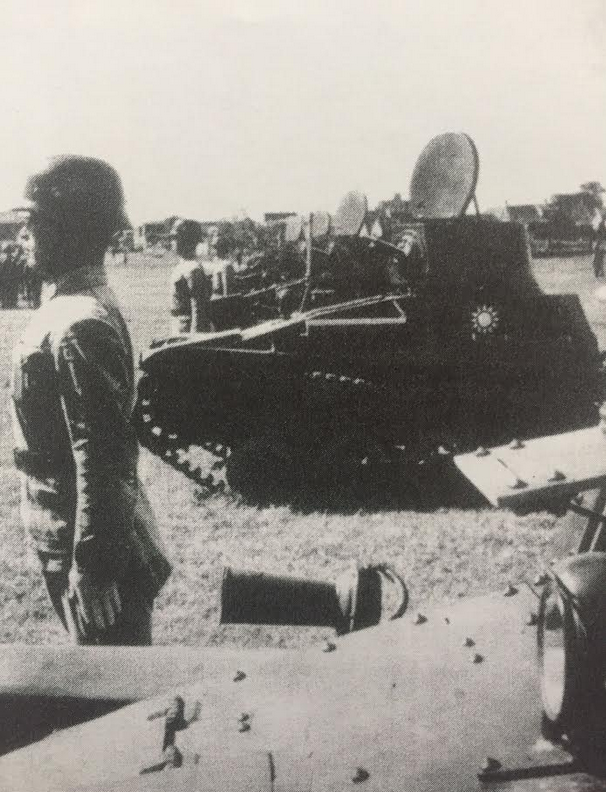
A line-up of Type 94 tankettes during a parade, identified by the blue and white sun emblem on the side

The units that were considered to be the most reliable and loyal by Wang Jingwei included the three Guards divisions in Nanjing (about 10,000 men per division), the 1st Front Army (about 20,000 men), based throughout the Lower Yangtze, and the Taxation Police Corps (about 3,000 men), which had been raised personally by Zhou Fohai and were loyal to him. The Capital Guards Divisions were formed from an independent brigade created in May 1941 in Nanjing, which was considered a success and raised to the size of a division. Shortly afterwards another two divisions were created. These Guards units were given the best equipment, weapons, and uniforms, with a personal loyalty to Wang himself. The Taxation Police Corps was created in Shanghai by Finance Minister Zhou Fohai for his own protection and owed its loyalty to him, and he sought to raise its quality to that of a regular IJA division. It increased in size from 3,000 to around 20,000 men. They, like Wang's Capital Guard divisions, received some of the best supplies and were highly regarded as among the Nanjing regime's best units. They were later moved out of Shanghai and were used for fighting guerillas. Morale and reliability of the average Nanjing Army units was a matter of their location. Intelligence reports from 1944 indicate that those units who were stationed near Nanjing and took orders from Wang Jingwei's government were more effective and motivated than those who were further away and commanded by others.

==== Organization ====
The standard divisional organization of the Nanjing Army was as follows:

- 1 headquarters company
- 3 infantry regiments (3 battalions of 3 companies each)
- 1 mountain artillery battery
- 1 engineer company
- 1 signal unit

Wang Jingwei inspecting an honor guard during a parade, 1942. Note the officers holding swords as per the Japanese tradition

However, this structure was rarely followed and there was a disparity in the sizes of different units. For example, some units referred to as "armies" had a strength of a few thousand men while others that were called "divisions" had more than 6,000. Only the elite Guards divisions in Nanjing actually followed the standard structure. In order to improve organization, a central wireless station was built in Nanjing and smaller relay posts throughout occupied China were also established to improve communications between the general staff and outlying units. By January 1943 it was reported that the units in and around Nanjing were organized into a "Metropolitan Defense Army" of some 30,000 men, consisting of the three Guards divisions. Reports from October 1943 claimed that the strength of the Nanjing Army in south and central China was 42 divisions, 5 independent brigades, and 15 independent regiments. Information regarding the Nanjing Army is incomplete and creating a full picture of the Wang Jingwei regime's order of battle is impossible. There were different estimates for their total troop numbers, ranging from 300,000 to as much as 683,000.

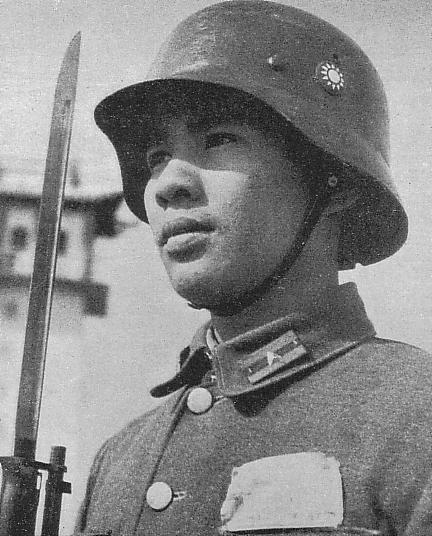
A soldier of the Nanjing Army

In effect, most military forces in north China that were part of the Nanjing Army were really under the authority of the semi-autonomous North China Political Council, led by former Provisional Government leader Wang Kemin. In 1940, it was reported that the total strength of the units in North China was 22 regiments, along with 8 independent and training regiments. As a result of a recruitment drive in November 1940, the North China Political Council's army increased from 26,000 to 41,000 men. The number of collaborationist police in the region was about 135,000 and local militia numbered about 200,000. Following a reform in 1942, the army increased to 30 regiments. The regimental structure of the North China Council forces was as follows:

- 3 infantry battalions
- 1 machine gun company
- 1 mortar company
- 1 cavalry troop
- 1 signal company

The first Nanjing Army military academy was actually established before the government, in 1939 near Shanghai, to train the forces of earlier puppet governments. The academy was first commanded by Ye Peng, a former Nationalist officer, and included 800 cadets divided into two battalions. The academy was issued with some of the best equipment by the Japanese and was intended to allow for the rapid expansion of the Nanjing Army. In September 1941 a Central Military Academy was established in Nanjing with and initial enrollment of one thousand cadets between the ages of eighteen and twenty-five. The training course was provided for two years before they were intended to join the army as junior officers, and Wang hired reserve Japanese officers to serve as instructors. US intelligence reports indicate that later on they formed a branch of the Central Military Academy in Canton, and another military academy in Beijing, the latter of which probably was used to prepare officers for the units under the North China Political Council's authority.

==== Operations ====
A light machine gun crew armed with a Czechoslovak ZB-26

The majority of the work undertaken by the Nanjing Army was guard and police duty in the occupied territories, in order to free up Imperial Japanese Army troops to fight on more important fronts. One of their main tasks was to combat Communist guerrillas fighting in occupied zones. The other main task was to provide support for Japanese army units during their campaigns. Information on the exact details of their operations remain vague and hard to find, however it was known that they took part in several major actions during the war against both Communist partisans and the Nationalist Army. Their first major pacification operation occurred to the east and northeast of Suzhou in May 1941. They fought in support of Japanese forces against the Communist New Fourth Army and gave the insurgents heavy casualties before they retreated out of the area. By fall, it was considered a success. From 1941 to 1944 the troops of Wang's military fought with Japanese forces in a campaign to eliminate Nationalist insurgents in the area between Hangzhou and the Yangtze River. Late in the war, with the defeat of Japan inevitable, several army units redeployed themselves in the Lower Yangtze region on orders of President Chen Gongbo.

After the surrender of Japan in August 1945, the Nanjing Government fell quickly and few military units remained loyal to it. Among those were Central Military Academy cadets, who built fortifications in Nanjing before fights broke out between the pro-Chen Gongbo and pro-Chiang Kai-shek factions. Most Nanjing units, however, surrendered peacefully and joined the Nationalists. Reportedly, the Guards Divisions and some of the cadets from the Shanghai Naval Academy later distinguished themselves fighting for the Nationalists during the Chinese Civil War.

==== Double agents ====
Some Chinese collaborators were in fact anti-Japanese double agents helped rescue downed American airmen from Japanese. The double agent warlords Sun Dianying and Pang Bingxun in Henan, who were officially part of Wang Jingwei's collaborationist army, helped rescue downed American airmen who were bombing the Japanese and they gave intelligence on Japanese troops movements. Sun Dianying hosted American OSS agents like Team Jackal under Major Paul Cyr and Chinese guerrillas carrying out sabotage attacks and guerilla attacks against Japanese, in his base in Xinxiang, Henan under the nose of the Japanese. They parachuted into his base area safely to attack Japanese behind the front lines.

American medical missionary Walter H. Judd said in testimony before US Congress on 25 April 1939, that not even one-hundredth of 1 percent of the Chinese people supported Japan, and that many Chinese "puppet" collaborators were in fact double agents against Japan, with him personally knowing a "puppet" magistrate in and occupied city who gave 30% of the taxes he collected to anti-Japanese guerrilla fighters and he said he only did not personally join the guerrilla war and stayed behind to pretend to collaborate, because he was too old to fight.

The Communists however considered Pang Bingxun and Sun Dianying as actual collaborators who had led a portion of the 24th Group Army to surrender to the Japanese in May 1943 during the Taihang Mountains Campaign. Under an 'anti-communist, but not anti-Chiang Kai-shek' banner, the Collaborationist Army's 24th Group Army invaded Communist zones in Lin County at the Taihang Mountains and the areas south of the Wei River with the support of the Japanese Army on July 10. In response, the Eighth Route Army gathered nearly five regiments of the Hebei-Shandong-Henan Military Region and, with the cooperation of local militias, claimed to have annihilated over 5,600 out of over 8,000 troops from the Provisional Sixth Army of the Collaborationist 24th Group Army and captured over 3,000 rifles defending the areas south of the Wei River from July 30 to August 19. The Taihang and Southern Hebei Military Regions also gathered fifteen regiments and launched a large-scale offensive against the Collaborationist 24th Group Army in Lin County and the surrounding areas on August 18, claiming to have annihilated over 7,000 more collaborationist troops out of over 10,000 and capturing 3,118 rifles while suffering 796 casualties by August 26. Over 400,000 civilians were claimed to have been liberated from the collaborators.

The Japanese North China Area Army was not impressed by the defeat, collapse, and retreat of the Collaborationist 24th Group Army from Lin County and Linqi in mid-August, especially since Pang Bingxun had boasted that the Communists were like 'mice' which the Japanese Army (acting as a 'dog') could not catch no matter how strong they were while his collaborationist troops were likened to a 'cat' that would skillfully eradicate the 'mice'.

=== Navy ===
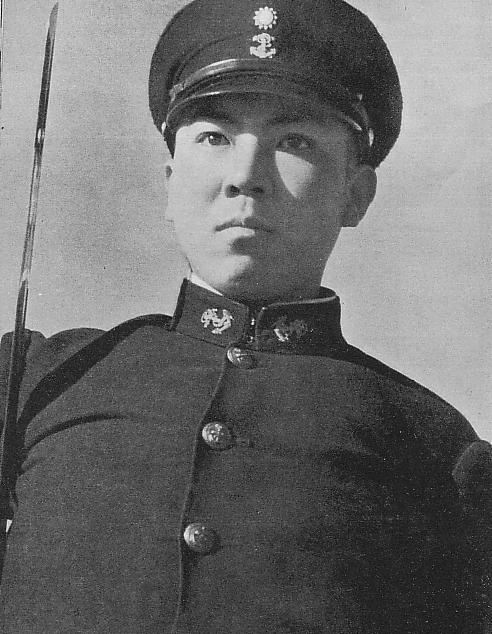
A cadet of the Shanghai naval academy

Naval Jack of the Nanjing Regime (1940–1945)

The Navy of the Reorganized National Government was first created on 13 December 1940 by the Japanese, with an inauguration ceremony taking place in Weihaiwei. It was attended by officials, including vice chief of naval staff, Zhang Xiyuan, along with the commander of the Japanese naval forces operating in north China. Several former Nationalist navy vessels were handed over by Japan, along with several naval bases, including Weihaiwei and Qingdao. There are reports that the former Nationalist cruisers Ning Hai and Ping Hai were given to the Nanjing Navy by Japan and were commissioned in a large ceremony, becoming useful propaganda tools. They were used until 1943 when the Imperial Japanese Navy took them for its own use. By 1944, the Nanjing Navy was under the direct command of Naval Minister Ren Yuandao and mostly functioned as a coastal patrol force.

At that time, it was reported that the total strength of the Nanjing Navy was 19 warships, 12 gunboats, 24 special gunboats, and 6 survey craft. There were also 37 small vessels that were under construction since 1942. The navy also included two regiments of marines, one based at Canton and the other at Weihaiwei. A Naval Academy was also set up in Shanghai. The navy uniform was that of the IJN. Ratings wore white jumpers, trousers and cap with the jumper having a large blue collar with a white border, and the name of the sailor's ship in Chinese. Officers wore white jackets and trousers with a white peaked cap. High-ranking officers wore black tunics. That was worn with black trousers and black peaked cap with gold trimming and a woven cap badge. The badge was a wreath with a gold anchor along with a blue sky and sun badge above that.

=== Air force ===
A Ki-9 trainer aircraft of the Nanjing Government Air Force

Air force pilots during a graduation parade

The air force of the Nanjing Government was first formed in May 1941 with the founding of an Aviation School that took in a hundred cadets, and its first aircraft–three Tachikawa Ki-9 trainers–were received around that time. The Japanese eventually provided more Ki-9s and Tachikawa Ki-55 advanced trainers in 1942, in addition to some transports, including a Fokker Super Universal as Wang Jingwei's personal transport, and several Mitsubishi Ki-57 medium and Tachikawa Ki-54c light transports. Along with them there were also an L2D3 transport and Nakajima Ki-34 eight-passenger planes. Wang Jingwei planned to expand the air force and to form a fighter squadron with some Nakajima Ki-27 fighters. However, the Japanese did not trust the Nanjing Air Force enough to give them any combat aircraft, worrying that the pilots might defect to the Nationalists along with them. Morale was reportedly low and a number of Nanjing Air Force pilots made contacts with the Nationalist intelligence service. Some defections by pilots also took place, though the exact number is unknown.

The only offensive craft that the Nanjing Air Force possessed were two Tupolev SB bombers which had been flown by defecting Nationalist pilots. In September 1940 another one defected, piloted by the crew of Captain Zhang Diqin and Lieutenants Tang Houlian and Liang Wenhua. They were given a substantial monetary reward for their defections.

An entirely new uniform was designed for the Air Force but were restricted to the officers in command positions. It consisted of a khaki peaked cap, wool jacket with open collar worn with a white shirt and a black tie, along with khaki wool slacks worn with leather shoes. The peaked cap had a gold band round it and a golden woven cap badge with a winged propeller mounted on a wreath.

Aircraft	Origin	Type	Variant	In service	Notes
Combat Aircraft
Tupolev SB	Soviet Union	bomber	SB-2	2	Flown by defecting Nationalist crews
Transport
Fokker Super Universal	United States Canada	transport		1	
Beechcraft-17	United States	transport		1	
Showa/Nakajima L2D	Japan	transport	L2D3	1	
Mitsubishi Ki-57	Japan	transport		1+	
Nakajima Ki-34	Japan	transport		1+	
Tachikawa Ki-54	Japan	transport		3	
Trainer
Tachikawa Ki-9	Japan	trainer		3	
Tachikawa Ki-55	Japan	advanced trainer		1+	
Avro 504	United Kingdom	trainer		1+	

=== Police ===
The Japanese raised various local police and militia units to maintain order. Many of these organizations were given names such as "pacification committee" or others. In northern China, there were 63,000 local police officers, or about 130 per district. In addition there was an internal security police which consisted of 72,000 men, or about 200 per district, although its role was ambiguous. Sources report that different militias reached a total strength of about 200,000 in north China, although they were very poorly armed. Other militias included rural and volunteer guards, which were collectively known as the "Peace Preservation Corps".

In Shanghai, the "Great Way Government" set up its own police force to keep public order in the city following the retreat of the Nationalist Army after the Battle of Shanghai. The first police were established under the leadership of Zhang Songlin, the former Jiangsu provincial police commander. Taxes were levied on imports and exports to provide the funding for this new force. This new Shanghai police force accepted anyone, including former criminals that had been released by the retreating Nationalists, and thus it was considered totally unreliable by the Japanese. It was recorded of having committed many crimes and was encouraged to rob citizens of their money because they were paid almost nothing. The police often looked the other way when crimes were being committed by others in return for bribes. Efforts to improve its performance included the setting up of a cadet training course which took in 300 cadets. It grew from an initial strength of 64 men upon its creation in 1938 to 6,125 personnel by February 1939, and had 11 branch bureaus, 5 police stations, and 8 special units, including a training center, river police corps, and a hospital. The Shanghai police continued to function after the creation of Wang Jingwei's government and the dissolution of the Great Way municipal authority, and further increased to 7,501 as of January 1941.

A Gendarmerie Command was also organized in Beijing.

== Ranks ==
=== Commissioned officer ranks ===
The rank insignia of commissioned officers.

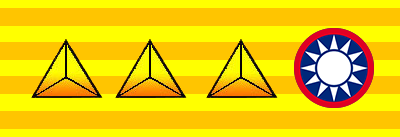
Rank group	General / flag officers					Senior officers			Junior officers
Nanjing Army
Nanjing Army	特級上將; Tèjí shàngjiàng	一級上將; Yījí shàngjiàng	二級上將; Èrjí shàngjiàng	中將; Zhōngjiàng	少將; Shàojiàng	上校; Shàngxiào	中校; Zhōngxiào	少校; Shàoxiào	上尉; Shàngwèi	中尉; Zhōngwèi	少尉; Shàowèi	准尉; Zhǔnwèi

=== Other ranks ===
The rank insignia of non-commissioned officers and enlisted personnel.

Rank group	Non-commissioned officers			Enlisted
Nanjing Army
Nanjing Army	上士; Shàngshì	中士; Zhōngshì	下士; Xiàshì	上等兵; Shàngděng bīng	一等兵; Yīděng bīng	二等兵; Èrděng bīng

== Other military units ==
There were numerous other collaborationist units that operated in other parts of China under the Japanese. The most notable were the armed forces of the separate puppet state of Manchukuo, along with minor units, such as the early East Hebei Army (1935–37, later merged with the Provisional Government Army), and the Inner Mongolian Army, mainly operating in the puppet state of Mengjiang (which was made an autonomous region of the Reorganized National Government, but was de facto independent).

== See also ==
- Hebei-Chahar Political Council
- Autonomous Government of Eastern Hebei
- Manchukuo Imperial Army
- Kuomintang-Nanjing
