= Hu Yukun =

Chinese military leader

- 胡毓坤
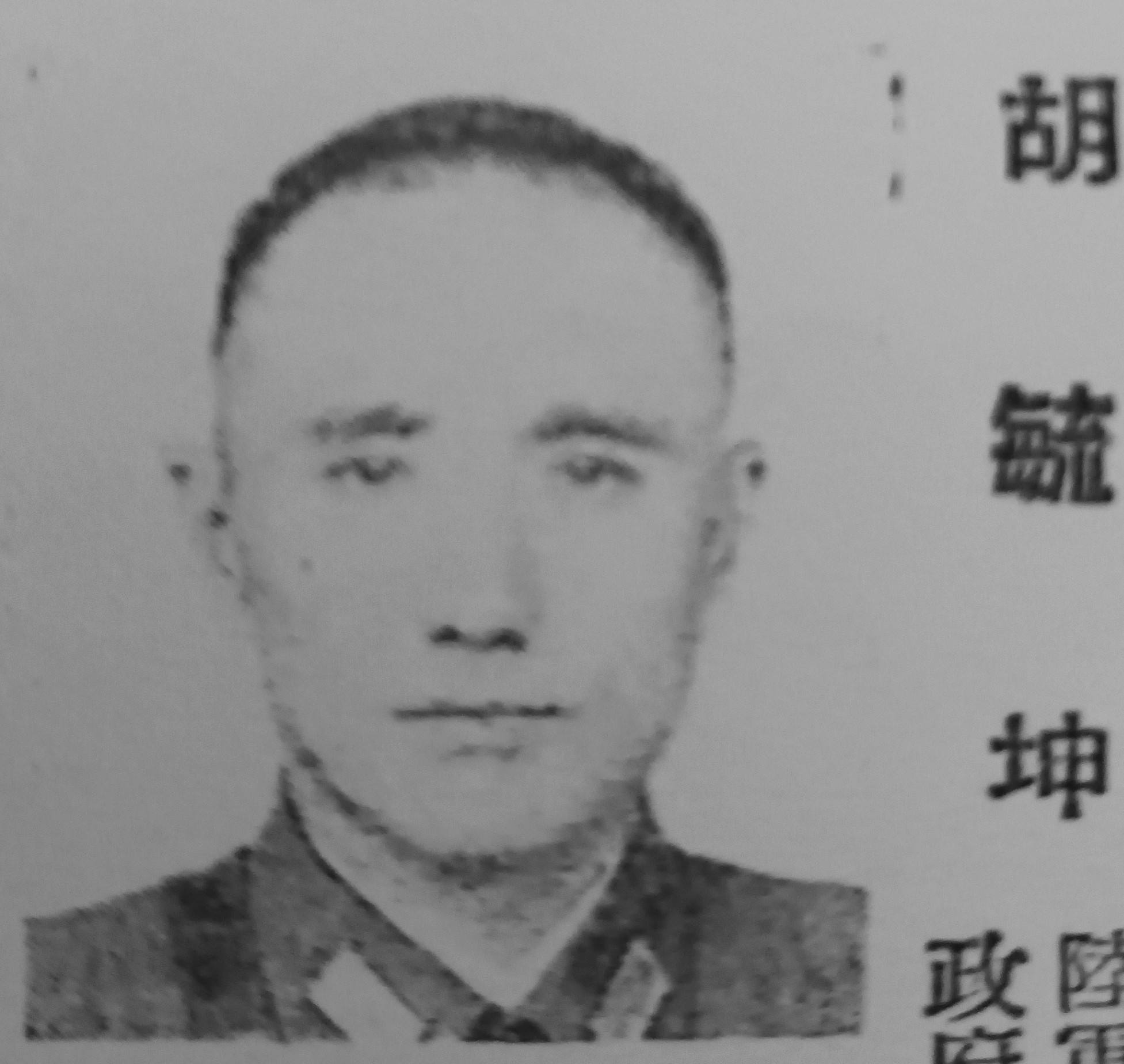
- Born: 1885; Haicheng
- Died: May 24, 1946 (aged 60–61); Nanjing, Republic of China
- Cause of death: Execution by firing squad
- Military career
- Allegiance: Republic of China
- Rank: Chief of Army Staff
- Commands: 4th Mixed Brigade of the 1st Division
- Conflicts: Warlord Era; Sino-Soviet conflict (1929); Central Plains War; Second Sino-Japanese War; World War II

Hu Yukun (Chinese: 胡毓坤; pinyin: Hú Yùkūn; Wade–Giles: Hu Yü-k'un; 1885 – May 24, 1946) was a military leader in the Republic of China. He belonged to the Fengtian clique, and was Zhang Xueliang's confidant. Eventually he became an important commander during the Wang Jingwei regime (Republic of China-Nanjing, known also as Reorganised National Government of China). His courtesy name was Lingchen (凌塵). He was born in Haicheng, area of control of the General of Shengjing (now Liaoning).

== Biography ==
Hu Yukun won promotion in the Fengtian clique, later he was appointed Commander to the 4th Mixed Brigade of the 1st Division which Li Jinglin commanded in 1925. The next year, Li was ruined because of attempting anti-Zhang Zuolin's action. Li's Army was reorganized to the 16th Army and the 17th Army of Anguojun (安国軍), Hu Yukun was catapulted to be Commander of the 17th Army.

On June 4, 1928, Zhang Zuolin was assassinated by the Kwantung Army, and his son Zhang Xueliang succeeded him. Hu Yukun was transferred to the post of Councilor of the Headquarters, Northeast Border Defence Army (東北邊防軍司令部參議官). The next year, requisition of the Chinese Eastern Railway by Zhang Xueliang led to an armed conflict between Zhang and the Soviet Union. Hu was appointed Commander of the 2nd Army of the Defense Forces against Russia (防俄軍). In 1930 Central Plains War broke out, Hu was appointed Commander of the 3rd Army of the Subjugation Forces (討逆軍), and attacked the Anti-Chiang Kai-shek's Army.

In May 1933 Hu Yukun was appointed a member to the Beiping Branch of the Nationalist Government's Military Commission (國民政府軍事委員會北平委員會常務委員). In April 1935 he became corresponding lieutenant general (陸軍中將銜). In December he was appointed a member of the Hebei–Chahar Political Council. In December 1936, shortly after Zhang Xueliang triggered off the Xi'an Incident, Hu also supported Chiang's capture by Zhang. But after this incident, Zhang in turn was arrested by Chiang, so Hu fell from Chiang's favour.

In 1938, Hu Yukun was invited to participate in the Wang Jingwei's group by Bao Wenyue (鮑文樾) who was Hu's colleague. Hu also participated to this group. In March 1940 the Wang Jingwei regime was established, Hu was appointed a member of the Military Committee. The next month, he became Security Commander of the Border Area between Jiangsu and Henan (蘇豫邊區綏靖司令). In 1943 he was appointed a member of the Military Commission to Northern China, and bestowed the rank of General. In next March he was appointed Director General for Northern China (駐華北軍務長官). In April 1945 he was appointed Chief of the General Staff of the Military Committee.

After the Wang Jingwei regime had collapsed, Hu Yukun was arrested by Chiang Kai-shek's National Government. He was convicted of treason and surrender to the enemy (namely Hanjian) and sentenced to death by a military tribunal. He was executed by firing squad at Nanjing on May 24, 1946.

Military offices
Preceded by Bao Wenyue	Chief of Army Staff; April 1945 – August 1945	Succeeded by Position abolished

== Footnotes ==
- Xu Youchun (徐友春) (main ed.) (2007). Unabridged Biographical Dictionary of the Republic, Revised and Enlarged Version (民国人物大辞典 增订版). Hebei People's Press (Hebei Renmin Chubanshe; 河北人民出版社). ISBN 978-7-202-03014-1.
- Yu Zidao (余子道) (etc.) (2006). The Complete History of Wang's Fake Regime (汪伪政权全史). Shanghai People's Press (Shanghai Renmin Chubanshe; 上海人民出版社). ISBN 7-208-06486-5.
- Liu Shoulin (刘寿林) (etc.ed.) (1995). The Chronological Table of the Republic's Officer (民国职官年表). Zhonghua Book Company. ISBN 7-101-01320-1.
