= Bao Wenyue =

Chinese military officer (1892-1980)

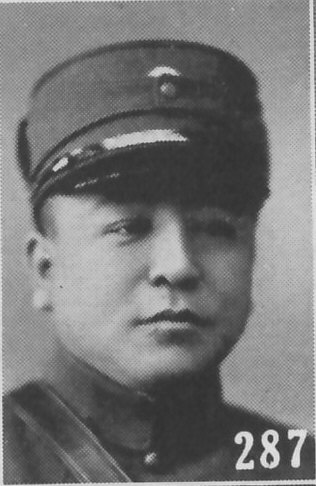
- Bao Wenyue as pictured in The Most Recent Biographies of Chinese Dignitaries

Minister of Military Affairs (Nanjing Nationalist Government)
- In office March 1940 – April 1943 (acting until March 1941)
- President: Wang Jingwei
- Preceded by: Office established
- Succeeded by: Ye Peng

Chief of Staff (Nanjing Nationalist Army)
- In office April 1943 – April 1945
- Preceded by: Liu Yufen
- Succeeded by: Hu Yukun

Personal details
- Born: 1892 Liaoning, Qing China
- Died: April 1980 (aged 87–88) Taipei, Taiwan

Military service
- Allegiance: (Republic of China (1912–1949)) Republic of China; Reorganized National Government of the Republic of China
- Years of service: ?—1945
- Rank: General
- Battles/wars: Second Sino-Japanese War

Bao Wenyue (traditional Chinese: 鮑文樾; simplified Chinese: 鲍文樾; pinyin: Bào Wényuè; Wade–Giles: Pao Wen-yüeh, 1892 - April 1980) was a Chinese warlord and military officer who was the Minister of Military Affairs in the Wang Jingwei regime during the Second Sino-Japanese War.

== Biography ==
Bao was born in Liaoning in 1892. He was a graduate of the Peking Military Institute. From 1931 to 1939. Bao was a member of the Military Affairs Commission of the Republic of China. In 1939, he defected to the Japanese and was declared a traitor by the Nationalist government. In 1940 he was promoted to general by the collaborationist government under Wang Jingwei in Nanjing and was made the war minister. After the surrender of Japan in 1945, he was arrested by the Nationalists and sentenced to death in March 1947. However, the sentence was commuted to life imprisonment in May 1947 and Bao was sent to Taiwan following the Nationalist retreat there in 1949. He was imprisoned until his release in 1975 and died in Taipei in April 1980.
