= Ye Peng =

Chinese general

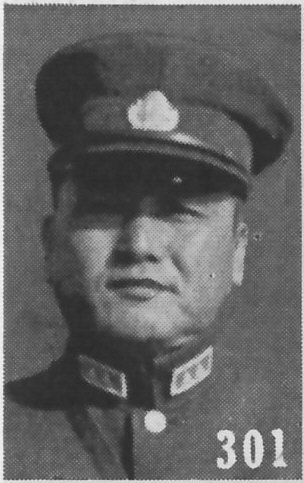
Ye Peng as pictured in The Most Recent Biographies of Chinese Dignitaries

Ye Peng (simplified Chinese: 叶蓬; traditional Chinese: 葉蓬; pinyin: Yè Péng; Wade–Giles: Yeh P'eng, sometimes also transliterated Ye Feng, 1897–1947) was a Chinese lieutenant general who fought for the Republic of China and later became a key figure in the Nanjing Nationalist Government of Wang Jingwei.

== Biography ==
Ye was born in Huangpi County, Hubei in 1897. He entered the Baoding Military Academy in 1917 and graduated in 1919 from its artillery department. He rose through the ranks of the National Revolutionary Army during the 1930s, holding various military posts. In 1939 he joined Wang Jingwei and his pro-peace faction, being appointed to the Kuomintang central committee under his Reorganized National Government of China. Ye became the head of a training center in Shanghai and was a member of the Central Military Commission. In 1941 he was appointed to command the 29th Army. In June 1942, he replaced Yang Kuiyi as Chief of General Staff. In April 1943, he became head of the Minister of Military Affairs. In 1945 Ye became governor of the Hubei Province. After the defeat of Japan in August of that year, he served under Chiang Kai-shek again briefly, commanding the 7th Army. On September 18, however, he was executed in Nanjing for the crime of hanjian.

== Alma mater ==
Baoding Military Academy

== Sources ==
=== Literature ===
- Xu, Youchun. Dictionary of the People of the Republic (民国人物大辞典 増訂版). Hebei People's Publishing House, 2007. ISBN 978-7-202-03014-1.
- Liu, Shou. Official Chronology of the Republic of China (民国職官年表). Zhonghua Book Company, 1995. ISBN 7-101-01320-1.

Military offices
Preceded by Yang Kuiyi	Chief of Army Staff; June 1942 – August 1942	Succeeded by Liu Yufen
Political offices
Preceded by Bao Wenyue	Minister of Military Affairs; April 1943 – March 1945	Succeeded by Xiao Shuxuan
Preceded by Yang Kuiyi	Governor of Hubei Province; March 1945 – August 1945	Succeeded by Position abolished
