= Xiao Shuxuan =

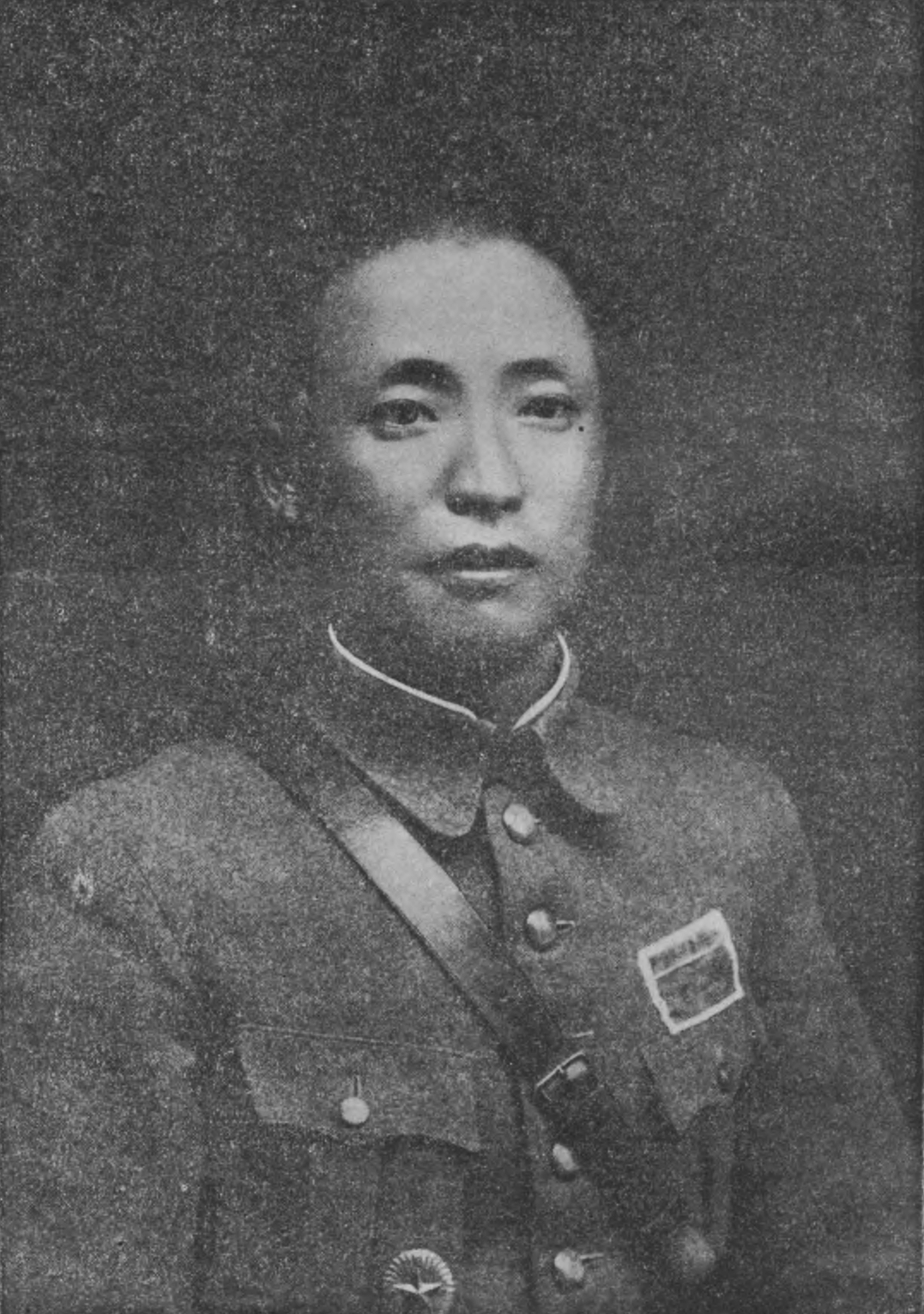
Xiao Shuxuan

Xiao Shuxuan (Chinese: 蕭叔宣; pinyin: Xiāo Shūxuān; Wade–Giles: Hsiao Shu-hsüan, 1894 - 19 August 1945) was a Chinese lieutenant general who served in the National Revolutionary Army before defecting to Wang Jingwei's Reorganized National Government of China. Xiao took part in the 1911 Xinhai Revolution and later fought in the Northern Expedition as a commander. In 1939-40, Xiao defected to Wang Jingwei's faction and joined his new pro-Japanese government. He held a number of prominent positions in Nanjing regime, including minister of Military Training and Chairman of the National Military Council. In 1943, when he was appointed head of the Central Military Academy and in March 1945, Army Minister.

He was killed in August 1945 while resisting arrest.

== Sources ==
=== Literature ===
- Xu, Youchun. Dictionary of the People of the Republic (民国人物大辞典 増訂版). Hebei People's Publishing House, 2007. ISBN 978-7-202-03014-1.
- Liu, Shou. Official Chronology of the Republic of China (民国職官年表). Zhonghua Book Company, 1995. ISBN 7-101-01320-1.

=== References ===
Political offices
| Preceded by Position established | Minister of Military Training; March 1940 – June 1942 (acting until March 1941) | Succeeded by Position abolished |
| Preceded by Ren Yuandao | Chairman of the National Military Council; August 1942 – March 1945 | Succeeded by Yang Kuiyi |
| Preceded by Ye Peng | Minister of Military Affairs; March 1945 – August 1945 | Succeeded by Position abolished |
