= Yang Kuiyi =

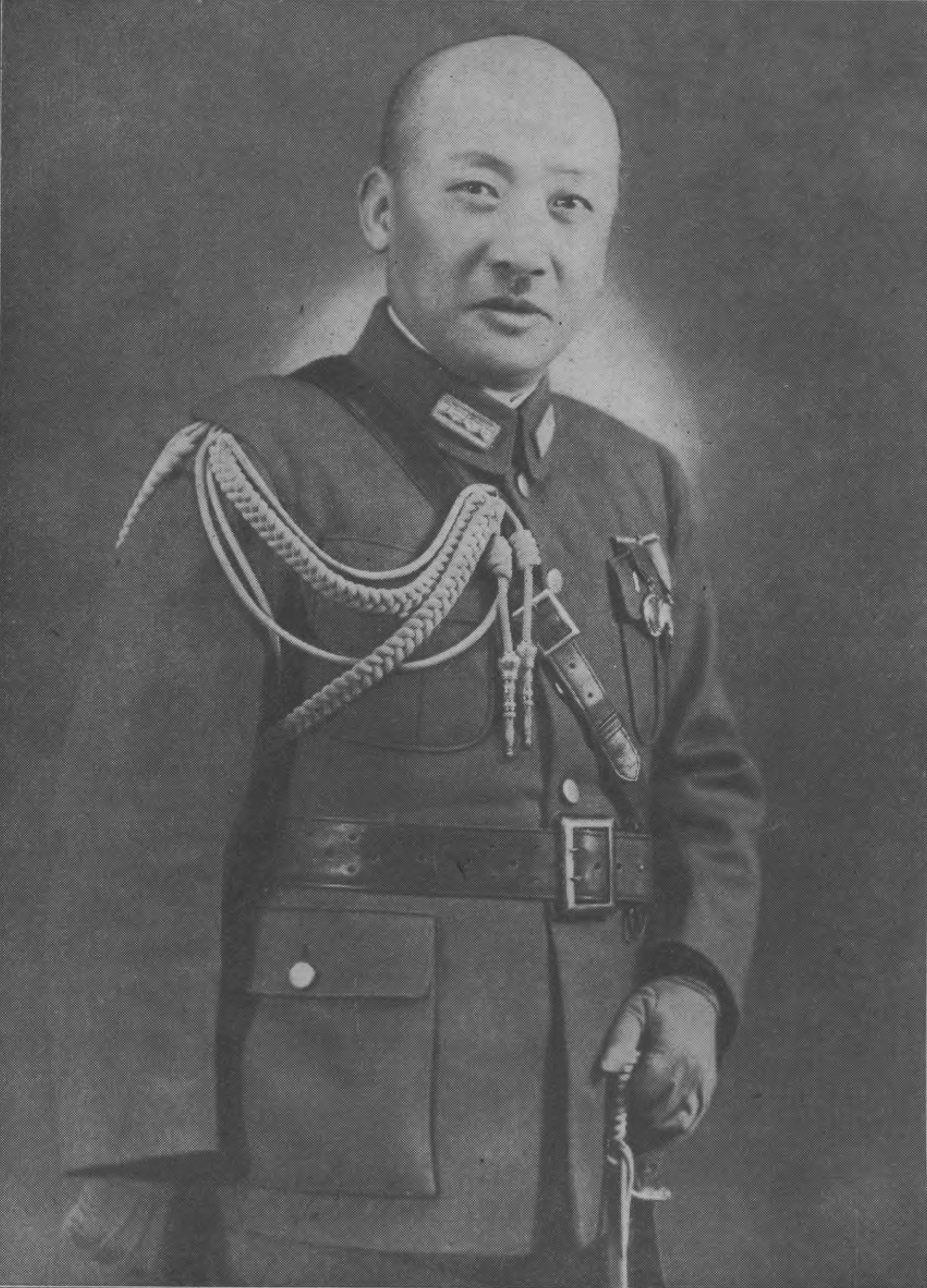
- Born: 1885; Hubei Province, Qing Dynasty
- Died: 1946 (aged 60–61); Nanjing, Republic of China
- Alma mater: Imperial Japanese Army Academy
- Military career
- Allegiance: Qing Dynasty (1903–12) (Republic of China (1912–1949)) Republic of China (1912–39); Nanjing Nationalist Government (1940–45)
- Branch: New Army; National Revolutionary Army
- Service years: 1903–45
- Rank: General
- Conflicts: Second Sino-Japanese War

Yang Kuiyi (Chinese: 杨揆一; pinyin: Yáng Kuíyī; Wade–Giles: Yang K'ui-yi, 1885 – 1946) was a Chinese general of the Second Sino-Japanese War who became a high-ranking military official of the Nanjing Nationalist Government, a regime established by Imperial Japan.

== Biography ==
Yang Kuiyi was born in the Hubei Province during the reign of the Guangxu Emperor and joined the local New Army in 1903. In 1912, he studied at the infantry department of the Imperial Japanese Army Academy. Upon his return to Republic of China he held various administrative positions in his native Hubei Province since the early 1930s and also rose through the ranks of the National Revolutionary Army. In 1939, he defected to the side of Wang Jingwei and joined his new pro-Japanese regime, proclaimed in Nanjing. When the Reorganized National Government was formally inaugurated in 1940, he was made Chief of General Staff and a member of several government committees. In 1942, he was made governor of the Hubei province, with the provincial government being reorganized in 1943. In 1945, Yang was appointed to head the National Military Council, a post that he held for the rest of the war. He was executed in 1946.

== Sources ==
=== Literature ===
- Xu, Youchun. Dictionary of the People of the Republic (民国人物大辞典 増訂版). Hebei People's Publishing House, 2007. ISBN 978-7-202-03014-1.
- Liu, Shou. Official Chronology of the Republic of China (民国職官年表). Zhonghua Book Company, 1995. ISBN 7-101-01320-1.

Military offices
Preceded by Position established	Chief of General Staff; March 1940 – June 1942	Succeeded by Ye Peng (as Chief of Army Staff)
Political offices
Preceded by He Peirong	Governor of Hubei Province; June 1942 – March 1945	Succeeded by Ye Peng
Preceded by Xiao Shuxuan	Chairman of the National Military Council; March 1945 – August 1945	Succeeded by Position abolished
