= List of World War II weapons of Greece =

This is a list of land weapons made or used by the Hellenic Army or Greek army during World War II.

== Rifles ==
=== Bolt-action rifles ===
- Mannlicher–Schönauer Y1903/14
- FN Nodel M1930
- Gras M1874/14
- Berthier M1916
- Lebel M1886/93
- Steyr-Mannlicher M1895
- Philippidis M1925 (based Mannlicher–Schönauer, but produced in Italia)
- Lelakis M1923 (based Gras and Mannlicher rifles., but produced in Italia)

=== Automatic rifles ===
- Rigopoulos rifle

== Knives and bayonets ==
- M1905 bayonet
- bayonet M1903
- bayonet M1903/14
- bayonet M1939

== Sidearms ==
- Ruby pistol
- FN Model 1922
- FN M1910
- FN M1900
- FN M1903
- Colt M1907 Army Special
- Mannlicher M1901
- Chamelot-Delvigne M1873
- Colt M1927 Official Police
- Nagant M1895
- Bergmann Bayard M1908

== Grenades ==
- Pyrkal grenades
- F1 grenade
- Churnat grenade

== Anti-Tank Weapons ==
- Boys anti-tank rifle

== Submachine guns ==
- Makrykano M1943

== Machine guns ==
=== Heavy machine guns ===
- Hotchkiss Mle 1914 machine gun
- EYP Hotchkiss
- Hotchkiss AAΜG
- St. Étienne Mle 1907
- Schwarzlose M1907/12

=== Light machine guns ===
- Hotchkiss M1922 machine gun (even improvised mode used)
- Chauchat
- EPK M1939
- Breda M30 (use by resistance)

== See also ==
- List of Greek military equipment of World War II
