= List of Greek-made weapons and improvements from interwar and World War II =

This is a list of land weapons made by Greece during World War II.

== Knives and bayonets ==
- bayonet M1903/14
- bayonet M1939

== Explosives ==
- Churnat grenade
- Churnat anti-tank mine

== Rifles ==
=== Bolt action ===
- Philippidis rifle
- Lelakis rifle

=== Automatic ===
- Rigopoulos rifle

== Submachine guns ==
- Makrykano M1943

== Machine guns ==
=== Heavy machine guns ===
- Modified Hotchkiss 13.2mm Dual Purpose

=== Medium machine guns ===
- EYP Hotchkiss

=== Light machine guns ===
- EPK M1939

== See also ==
- List of Greek military equipment of World War II
