= Schoenauer =

Schönauer, Schoenauer may refer to:

- Alex Schoenauer (born 1976, El Bolson, Argentina), an Argentine-American professional mixed martial arts (MMA) fighter
- Apameh Schönauer (born 1984, Tehran) German-Iranian architect, who was crowned Miss Germany 2024
- Detlev Schönauer (born 1953, Mainz), German Kabarettist
- Friedrich Schönauer (1904, Altenplos - 1950), German politician
- Helmuth Schönauer (born 1953, Innsbruck), Austrian writer and librarian
- Hermann Schoenauer (born 1950), rector
- Marianne Schönauer, née Schifferes (1920, Vienna - 1999, Vienna), an Austrian actress of Jewish descent (paternal Jewish)
- Thomas Schönauer (born 1953, Düsseldorf), German sculptor and artist

== Variant surnames ==
- Vladimir Šenauer (1930–2013), former Croatian football player

== See also ==
- Mannlicher–Schönauer
  - 6.5×54mm Mannlicher–Schönauer
  - 9.5×57mm Mannlicher–Schoenauer
