= Basileiades =

Basileiades "Hellenis" locomotive (1900)

Ship at Basileiades shipyards (early 20th century)

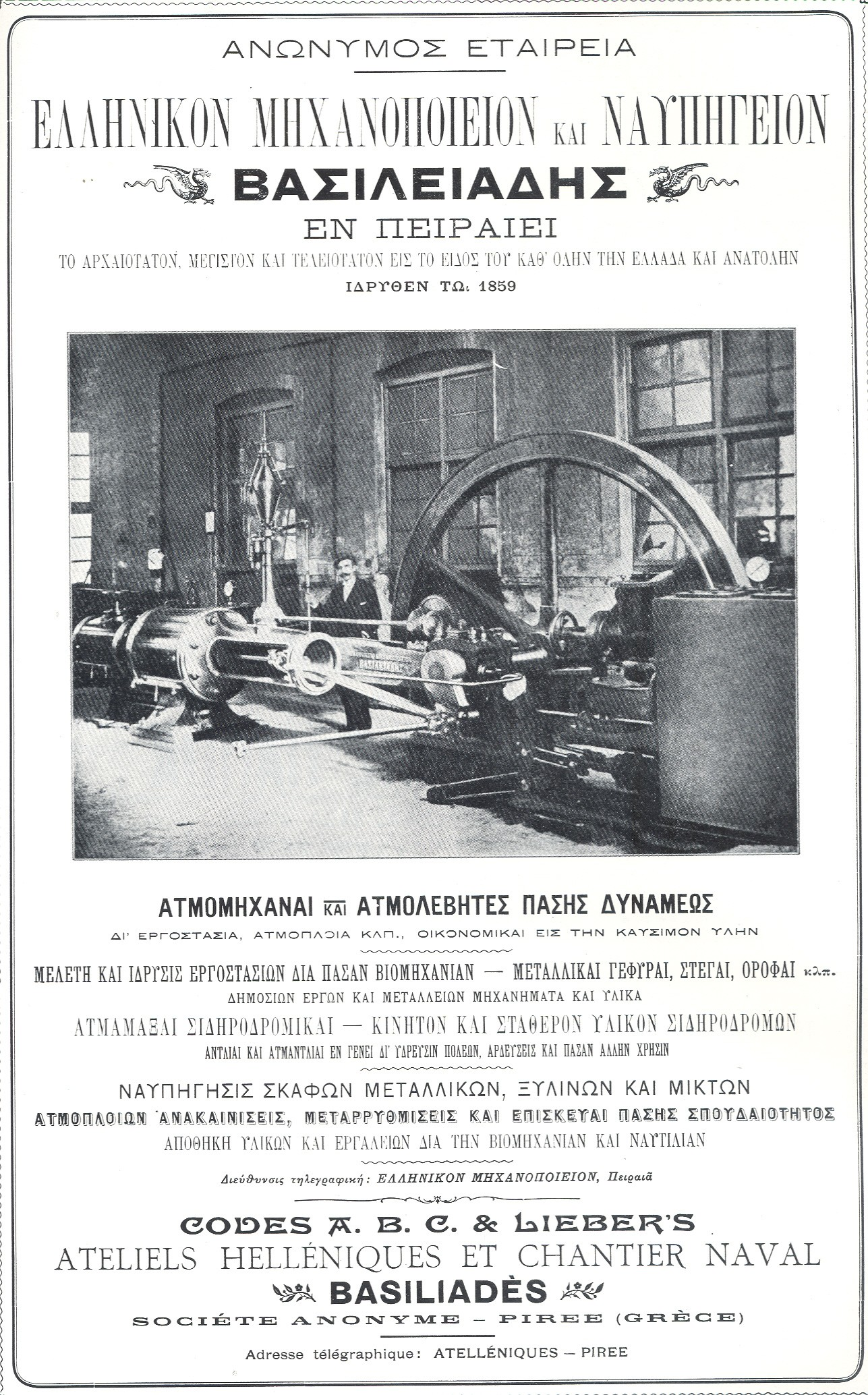
An early 1900s advertisement for Basileiades Company reading Basileiades machine building and shipyard

Basileiades was one of the most historic Greek machine building companies and the largest in its field in the country (as well as one of the most important Greek companies) during the second half of the 19th century. It was founded in Piraeus in 1859, and along with similar companies like Ifaistos and Kouppas in the same city, Neorion in Syros, Vlahanis-Petropoulos in Athens, Glavanis-Kazazis in Volos and others founded in the 19th century, mark the contribution of the machine building sector in the Greek Industrial Revolution. The company has also been one of the largest shipyards in Greece, especially during the first half of the 20th century.

== History ==
The evolution of Basileiades machine works was connected with the rapid development of Piraeus as an industrial and commercial center in Greece, replacing Ermoupolis in Syros. Except for shipbuilding (with its first all-metal steamship built in 1892), Basileiades produced an extensive range of metal and mechanical products, including steam engines, boilers, pumps, cranes, farm equipment, hydraulic devices, metal bridges, railroad material etc., while it was undertaking installation of entire factories and customized machinery building. It was also exporting some of its products, while in its advertisements it called itself "the most significant machine builder in Greece and the East".

Although railway wagons had been built in Greece during the 19th century, most relevant constructions were being undertaken by the Railway companies themselves (see also Piraeus Railway Works). Basileiades's limited relevant involvement was an exception: already engaged in railway equipment construction, in 1899 the company undertook an order for a Steam Locomotive for Attica Railways; construction was done based on an original French design. The historic locomotive, called "Hellenis" (Greek lady), was delivered in 1900 and offered its services for nearly 50 years before it was scrapped (only its badge was saved, exhibited today in the Railway Museum in Athens). However, the whole venture was short-lived: although the Basileiades company had already proudly announced its "Locomotive producer" status in contemporary advertisements, it soon determined that further production of such steam locomotives would be unprofitable.

Progressively Basileiades focused more on shipbuilding and, increasingly, ship repairs, in new facilities it had created in 1896 in the Drapetsona area, and before WWII it operated the largest Greek shipyard. Its facilities were damaged during the war by German bombing, this being the first step to a gradual decline of the company which was finally acquired in 1953 by the Hellenic Chemical Products and Fertilizers Company, AEEHPL (member of the giant Bodosakis industrial group) during the latter's expansion of activities. AEEHPL itself went out of business in 1999 following the earlier collapse of Bodosakis's "empire", having already sold the building and docks to Piraeus Port Authority in 1963.

The area where the facilities of this historic company used to be, are still called "Basileiades (or Vasiliadis) coast" (Ακτή Βασιλειάδη). The two dry docks (37.944070°N 23.6320050°E) are still in use, owned by Piraeus Port Authority S.A. and leased to ship maintenance contractors, and are still sometimes referred as "Vassiliadis Docks".
