= War Material Directorate (Greece) =

The War Material Directorate (Eforeia Ylikou Polemou, Abbreviation: EYP) was an agency of the Hellenic Army responsible for the management, storage, maintenance, and supply of war material.

== History ==
In 1866, by Royal Decree, the organization of the Arsenal included the Directorate, the Technicians' Company, the War Material Directorates, the Powder Mill, and the Pyrotechnic Factory.

By Law ALZ΄ of 1882, the Artillery included, among other things, the General Directorate and the War Material Directorates. In 1885, by Law ATKG΄ of December 31st, the Administration of the War Material Directorates was established.

In 1904, the War Material Directorate included, among other things, a General War Material Directorate, three Special Directorates, and six Branches.

Under the army structure of 1940, there was the Quartermaster Directorate and the War Material Directorate.

By order of January 3, 1941, the War Material Directorates of Ioannina and Kastoria were formed.

Technical work was carried out at the facilities of the War Material Directorate, including the modification of French Hotchkiss machine guns, known as Modified Hotchkiss.
