= 7.92×36mm EPK =

Rifle cartridge

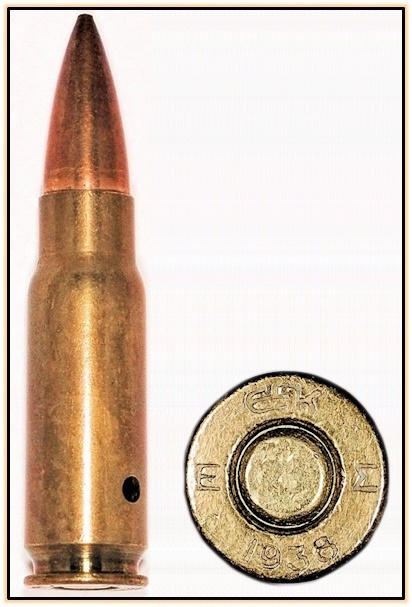
- Type: Light machine gun
- Place of origin: Kingdom of Greece

Production history
- Designed: 1939

Specifications
- Parent case: 6.5mm Mannlicher
- Bullet diameter: 8.24mm (.324 in)
- Land diameter: 7.92mm (.312 in)
- Case length: 36mm

The 7.92×36mm EPK was an experimental rifle round intended for the Pyrkal light machine gun, designed by EPK, a Greek defense company. The round is essentially a 6.5mm Mannlicher cartridge case shortened to 36mm and necked up to chamber a 7.92 mm bullet. It was designed in the mid 1930's.
