= Prodromos Bodosakis-Athanasiadis =

Greek businessman

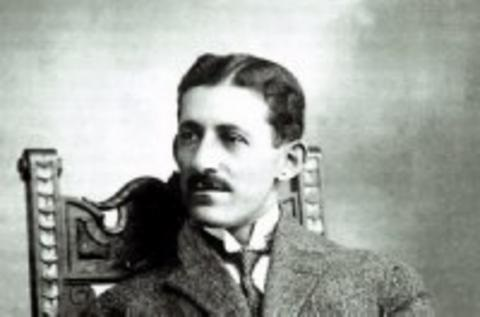
- Prodromos Bodosakis-Athanasiadis
- Born: 1890; Bor, Cappadocia, Ottoman Empire
- Died: 1979
- Education: Industrialist

Prodromos Bodosakis-Athanasiadis (Greek: Πρόδρομος Μποδοσάκης Αθανασιάδης; 1890–1979) was one of the most important figures in 20th century Greek industrial history. He created an immense industrial empire with weapons factories, mines and plants in diverse branches of industry in the 1930s.

== Early life ==
He was born to a Cappadocian Greek family in the region of Bor, Cappadocia, Asia Minor in 1890. Prodomos migrated to Greece after the Greco-Turkish War (1919–22). From 1934, he controlled the Pyrkal, one of the oldest Greek defence industries with significant contribution during the Greco-Italian War.
