= List of aircraft of Greece in World War II =

This is a list of aircraft used by the Royal Hellenic Air Force in World War II.

== Fighters ==
- PZL P.24
- Gloster Gladiator
- Bloch MB.150
- AEKKEA-RAAB R-29

== Bombers ==
- Bristol Blenheim
- Fairey Battle
- PBY Catalina
- Potez 63

== Reconnaissance ==
- Avro Anson
- Dornier Do 22

== Trainer ==
- Avia B-534
- AEKKEA-RAAB R-1C Schwalbe II

== See also ==
- List of Greek military equipment of World War II
