= Pyrkal =

Greek company

PYRKAL
- Native name: Greek: Πυρκάλ
- Type: Subsidiary
- Industry: Defense
- Founded: 1874/1908
- Defunct: 2004; 22 years ago
- Fate: Merged with Hellenic Arms Industry
- Successor: Hellenic Defence Systems
- Headquarters: Athens, Greece
- Key people: Prodromos Bodosakis-Athanasiadis
- Products: Weapons systems

Pyrkal (Greek: Πυρκάλ), founded in 1874, is one of the oldest defense industries in Greece and the country's primary producer of ammunition and explosives. Throughout its history, it has been one of the largest Greek companies. Since its foundation, Pyrkal has played a crucial role as a supplier in all military conflicts faced by the nation and has been a well-established exporter to five continents.

== Establishment and development ==
The company "Elliniko Pyritidopoieio A.E." (Greek Powder, Chemical, and Industrial Products) was founded in 1874, and "Maltsiniotis Brothers" (Cartridges and Metal Products) in 1887. In 1908, the two companies merged to resolve a rivalry over ammunition orders from the Greek state. This merger resulted in the formation of a new company called "Etairia (Ellinikou) Pyritidopoieiou kai Kalykopoieiou," with the initials EEPK or EPK (ΕΠΚ) — the acronym later used for Pyrkal. Internationally, it became known as the "Greek Powder and Cartridge Company" (GPCC) in English, and "Poudrerie et Cartoucherie Hellénique" (PCH) in French.

Starting with the production of ammunition such as 6.5×54mm Mannlicher–Schönauer ammunition for the Mannlicher–Schönauer rifle, as well as a variety of explosives (which included bombs used by Greek aircraft in aerial bombardment in 1912, during the First Balkan War), the company expanded to a variety of additional activities. These included arms manufacturing - most notably the development of the advanced EPK machine gun just before Greece's entry into World War II - as well as construction of machinery (including diesel engines), vehicle bodies, tools, factory infrastructure, boilers, and even aircraft, as it undertook constructions for the AEKKEA-RAAB company.

== Part of the Bodossakis "empire"; events up to, during and after WWII ==
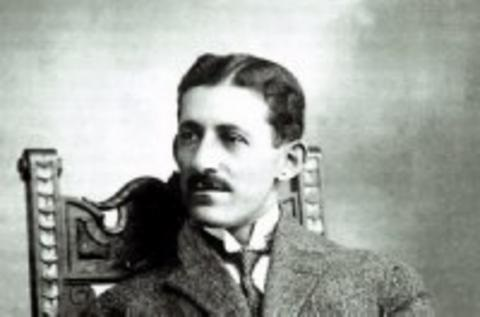
Prodromos Bodosakis-Athanasiadis

Starting in 1934, the company came under the control of Prodromos Bodosakis-Athanasiadis, one of the most influential figures in 20th-century Greek industrial history. Pyrkal eventually became part of the vast industrial empire created by Bodosakis in Greece and Cyprus. This empire spanned a wide range of industries, including mining (with several companies holding a dominant position in Greece), textiles, chemicals and fertilizers, beverages, glass manufacturing, engineering and construction, as well as services such as shipping and insurance.

In 1936-37, during the Spanish Civil War, German arms were supplied to the Spanish Republicans by Rheinmetall-Borsig, which was controlled by Hermann Göring, despite German forces supporting the Spanish Nationalists. Arms shipped to Greece with a Greek end-user certificate were diverted by Prodromos Bodosakis. Weapons intended for the Republicans were transferred to ships supposedly bound for Mexico, while the Nationalists received the best and latest equipment. The Republicans, on the other hand, were given the oldest and least serviceable arms. This supply reached its peak in 1937-38, with shipments from Rheinmetall-Borsig valued at up to 40 million Reichsmarks each. The Nationalists identified 18 vessels sent to Republican ports between 3 January 1937 and 11 May 1938, and it was estimated that Göring received the equivalent of one pound sterling per rifle. In November 1937, Bodosakis traveled to Barcelona on a Soviet aircraft and signed a contract to supply ammunition to the Republic for £2.1 million, paid in hard currency in advance. There have also been reports that the company assembled airplanes for the Nationalist forces.

Pyrkal's production was vital for Greece up to and during World War II. During the Axis occupation of Greece, the company's facilities were used by German forces, as a planned last-minute transfer or destruction of the equipment to prevent enemy use was never carried out. By the end of the war, the company was in ruins, with equipment and materials looted by retreating German forces. Its machine works, once called "the largest in the Eastern Mediterranean and the Middle East," were almost entirely destroyed. However, Pyrkal's recovery was nothing short of miraculous. The company initially began producing metal products and consumer goods but quickly regained its pre-war status, benefiting significantly from orders by the Hellenic Army, NATO and, ironically, West Germany. The following two decades were marked by prosperity and expansion, with new facilities built and new products developed.

== 1970s and 1980s: change of fortunes ==
The company suffered a significant setback when the Greek state established the Hellenic Arms Industry (EBO) in 1976. EBO initially took over the production of the Heckler and Koch G3 rifle, which was adopted by the Greek Army, replacing the FN FAL that Pyrkal had already begun producing under license. While a number of FN FALs had originally been purchased by the Greek military from Belgium, Pyrkal had produced about 30,000 units for export to other countries. EBO's development severely impacted Pyrkal, as the two companies offered partially overlapping products. Pyrkal was further weakened by the loss of traditional export markets in the 1970s. Other parts of Bodosakis's industrial empire also faced difficulties, leading to state intervention in the early 1980s. In 1982, Pyrkal, nearly bankrupt and a shadow of its former self (though still employing thousands), was nationalized. Since then, its financial performance has been unstable at best.

== New efforts and merger with Hellenic Arms Industry ==
Despite challenges, the company has invested in diversification and research and development, expanding its activities beyond the production of various ammunition types, mines, bombs, fuses for large-caliber high-explosive ammunition, and electronics. It also participated in programs such as the European post-production program for the Stinger missile and, as an equal partner, in the development and production of the IRIS-T missile. Additionally, in the early 1990s, it introduced its own advanced (though controversial) cluster bomb and, in 2002, constructed Greek-designed modern wind generators. In 2004, echoing a move made nearly a century earlier, Pyrkal merged with Hellenic Arms Industry (EBO) to eliminate competition between the two companies for state orders, forming Hellenic Defence Systems.

== Pyrkal equipment gallery ==
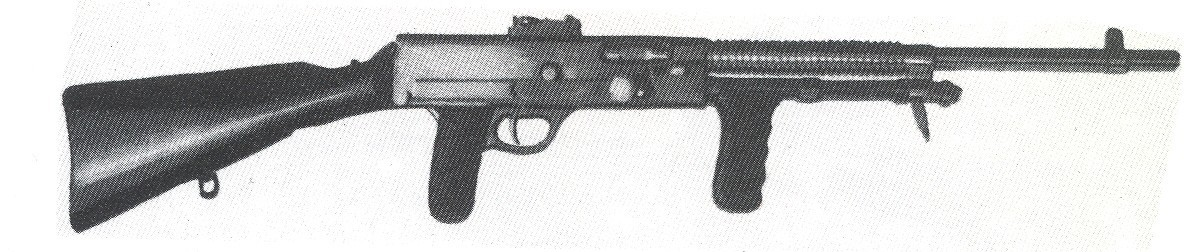
EPK (Pyrkal) machine gun (1939)

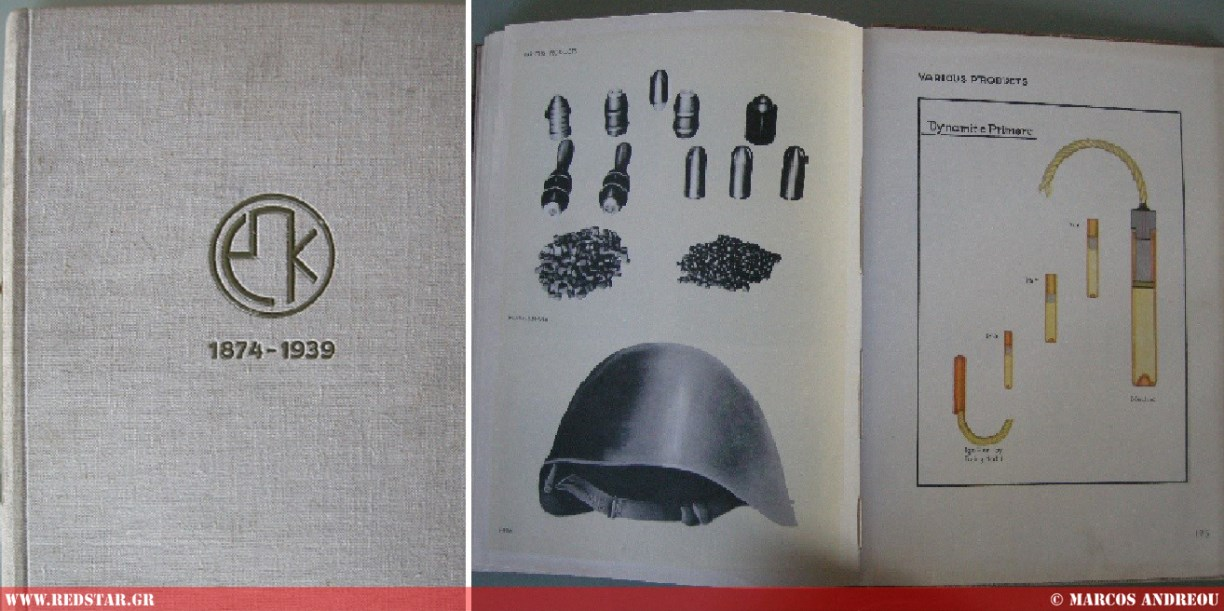
Image of the helmet proposed by the EPK for the 1936 competition to manufacture 250,000 helmets

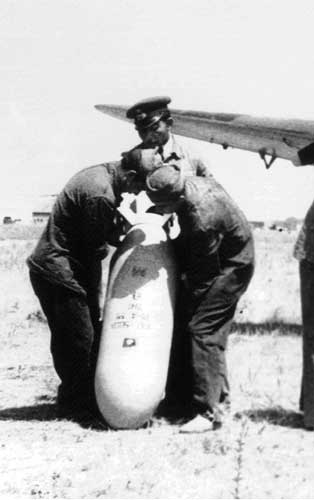
500 lb EPK (Pyrkal) bomb ready to be loaded on a Greek bomber during WWII

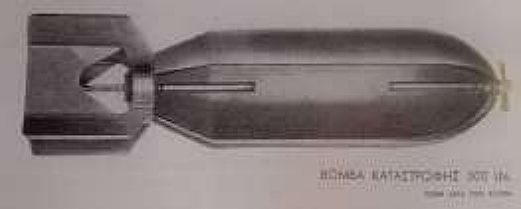
500 lb EPK (Pyrkal) demolition bomb 1939

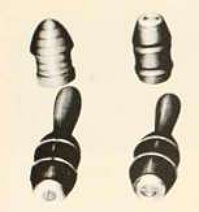
EPK (Pyrkal) hand grenades 1939

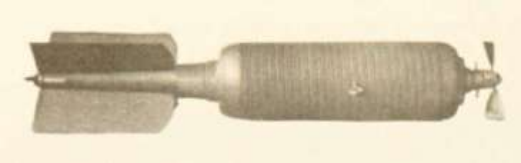
EPK (Pyrkal) fragmentation bomb 1939
