= Enfield Automotive =

Defunct British automobile manufacturer

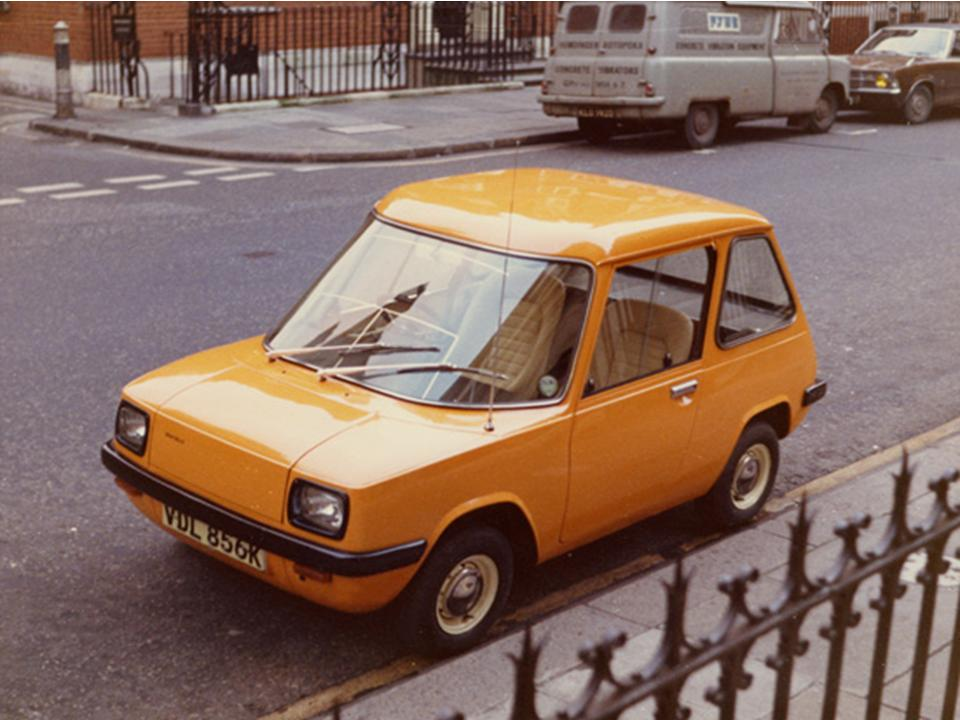
Enfield 8000 in London

Enfield Automotive was an electric car manufacturer founded in the United Kingdom in the 1960s. Under the ownership of Greek millionaire Giannis Goulandris, production was moved to the Greek isle of Syros during the oil crisis of 1973, although the vehicles were, according to one report, not up to the expected quality and production was moved back to the Isle of Wight while other that were part built in Syros were sent back to be assembled on the Isle of Wight. According to other reports, the cars were built on Syros and sent to Britain for installation of the batteries.

== Models ==
=== Enfield 465 ===
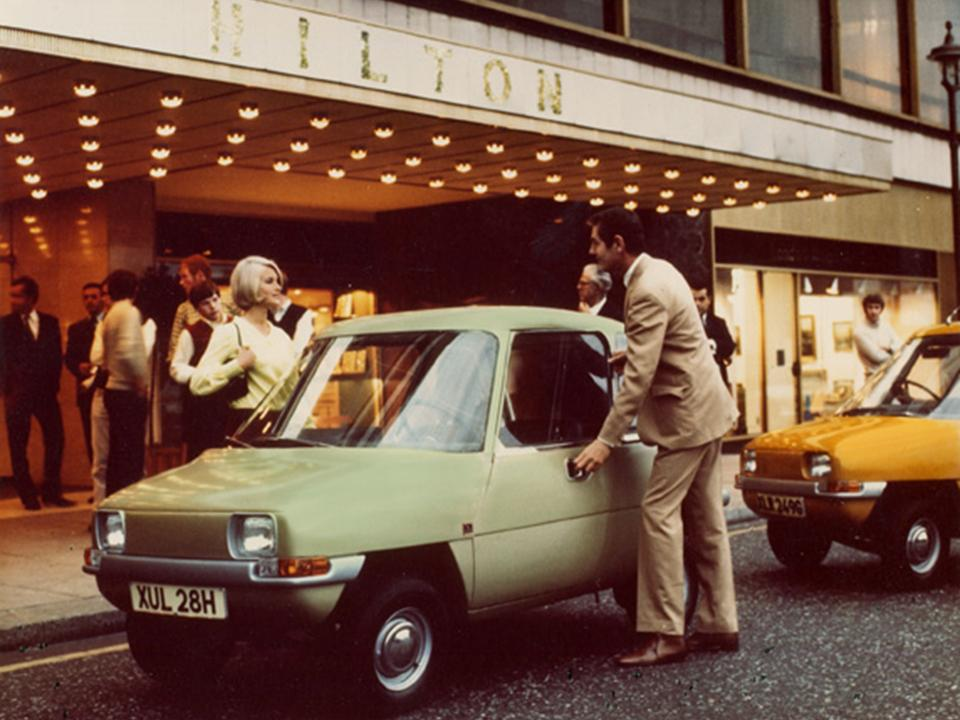
Enfield 465 publicity photo

The Enfield 465 was a small 2+2-seater electric car built only in prototype form in 1969. It was equipped with a 48 V, 4.65 bhp (3 kW) electric motor and had an ICI royal plastic body with no metal chassis. It is believed that only three were built but only two remain as one failed the crash testing. The rear axle came from a Bond Bug with the motor parallel to it.

=== Enfield 8000 ===
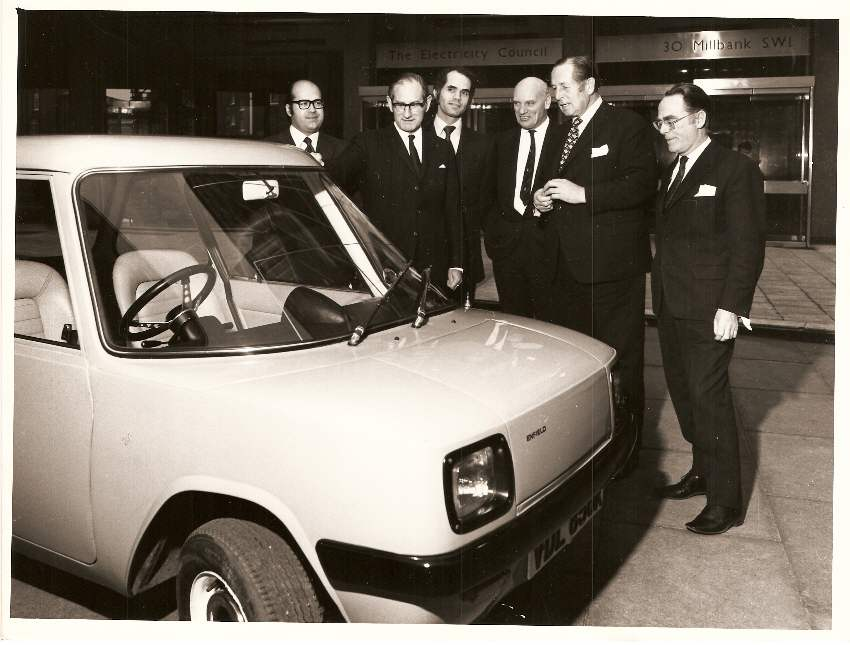
The Chairman of the Electricity Council and other EC Board members on the date of signing the contract for the Enfield 8000

The Enfield 8000 (also known the E8000 ECC or "Electric City Car") was similar to the 465, but with an 8 bhp (6 kW) motor and aluminium body. The prototypes and initial production were built at the Somerton Works in Northwood, near Cowes. 120 Enfield 8000s were built initially on the Isle of Wight and subsequently in Syros in the mid-1970s, of which 65 were used by the Electricity Council and southern English electricity boards.

The E8000ECC had passed all the necessary tests for production in the United Kingdom and was on its way to be produced in the United States of America. Then Governor of California Ronald Reagan sent a cargo plane to have three E8000ECCs moved to California in support of his Clean Air legislation. However, the E8000ECC was never produced in the United States. The unique aerodynamics of the E8000ECC were not based on traditional industry principles and ideas. They were loosely based on designs made by Konstantine Adraktas, the chairman and managing technical director of Enfield. Most of the electrical systems were designed and built by Peter Botterill. Production of the car was eventually moved to Greece after the company was incorporated into Neorion (also owned by Goulandris) and renamed Enfield-Neorion. However, soon the whole project was scrapped.

Enfield Runabout and Bicini.

The Runabout Model and the Bicini were produced in very small numbers on the Isle of Wight and in Syros, respectively, and used much of the same running gear as the Enfield 8000.

Enfield 4x4 Vehicles

These vehicles were only prototypes. They were large engine petrol engine vehicles referred to as 'Safari Cars' There was the Enfield Safari (produced on the Isle of Wight), and the Neorion Chicago (produced on the island of Syros; two were built, one blue and one red). There was also the Enfield Safari Estate (very much based on the Land Rover series III) and one other Safari car was partly built but not finished. this was based on a SWB Land Rover, it is assumed this was scrapped when the factory on the Isle of Wight closed) The other cars have all survived and are in private collections.

==== Key characteristics ====
- It had an aluminum body to guard against corrosion.
- It was available in a "Bicini" version which had a body composed of simple flat panels and was never crash tested.
- A leather interior was available.
- Early models had no gear lever, reverse was entered with the use of switch.
- It was based on widely available components and parts for easy maintenance and worldwide replacement part availability.
- It had an on-board charger (which recharged batteries fully while freewheeling downhill in the Alps.)
