= Neorion Chicago =

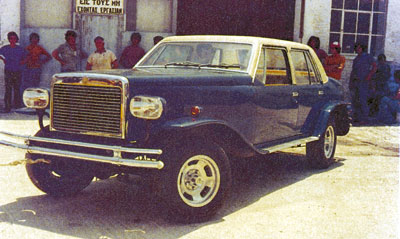

Overview
- Manufacturer: Neorion
- Designer: Georgios Michael

Body and chassis
- Body style: 4-door sedan
- Layout: Front engine, rear-wheel drive / four-wheel drive

Powertrain
- Engine: AMC V8

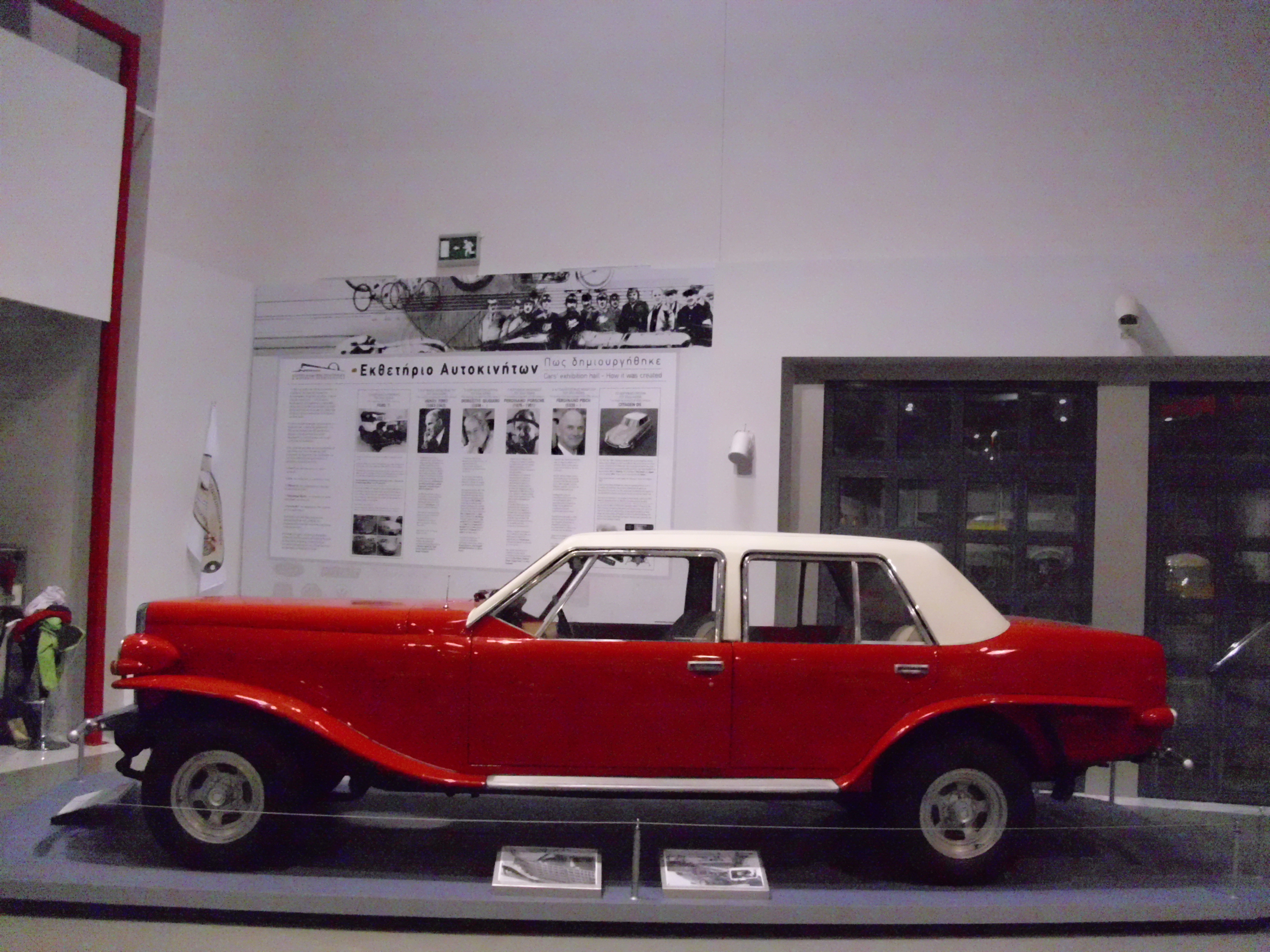
1974 Neorion Chicago 4×4 at the Thessaloniki Science Center and Technology Museum

The Neorion Chicago is a 4-door luxury sedan with sport utility vehicle-like characteristics and capabilities. Produced in 1974 by the Greek industrial group Neorion, only two examples of the car were fully built and sold before the project was terminated in 1976.

== History ==
In 1972, under the ownership of Greek millionaire Giannis Goulandris, Neorion incorporated Enfield Automotive, originally a British company, already owned by Goulandris, involved in the design and construction of electric cars. This led to the creation of a new company that undertook vehicle production, "Enfield-Neorion E.P.E.", headquartered in Piraeus, and production of the cars (which had been designed in the UK by British and Greek engineers) was transferred to Syros, where Neorion is based.

Apart from the production of electric cars, Goulandris wanted to develop "conventional" cars. One of his ideas was a mixture of a luxurious, retro-styled limousine with a very strong cross-country character and capabilities. The design and overall development of the car was assigned to a team of Greek engineers, headed by Georgios Michael.

After eight months of development work, the Chicago (the name inspired by its 1930s retro-style), was built at the Neorion dockyards in the town of Ermoupoli. A running version was introduced in 1974. Its construction included a steel chassis built by the Neorion shipyard and an aluminum body that incorporated additional reinforcements for passenger protection. The drivetrain came from the full-sized Jeep Wagoneer (SJ) and included the American Motors Corporation (AMC) V8 engine.

Early sketches by Michael suggested a more elegant limousine with a strong retro-look. However, the final design was significantly altered to accommodate the mechanical parts and structure to cope with the desired cross-country capabilities. The designer tried to distance himself from the car (which he often described as a "mountain dinosaur"), arguing that Goulandris had essentially dictated its basic elements. After many years, even its designer seems to have finally given some credit to his own creation.

A production line was started with four vehicles at various stages of construction when a change of Greek law condemned the market prospects of the car. Two complete vehicles were made and sold before the venture was terminated in 1976. One of the cars is exhibited in the Thessaloniki Science Center and Technology Museum. As of the 2010s, the second car is privately owned in England.
