= Neorion =

Greek vehicle manufacturer

ONEX Neorion Shipyards
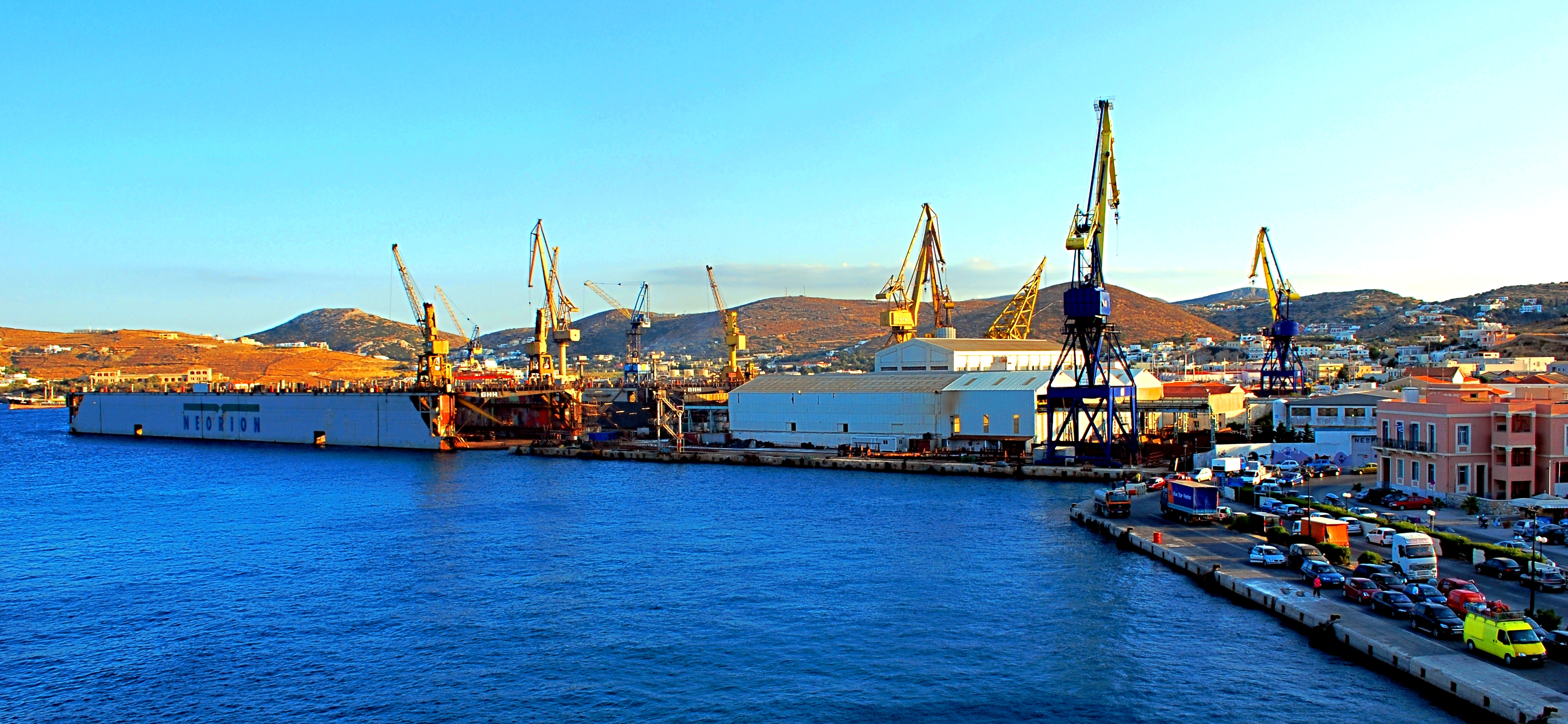
- Type: Private
- Industry: Shipbuilding
- Founded: 1861; 165 years ago
- Headquarters: Syros, Greece
- Key people: Panos Xenokostas, President, CEO & Owner
- Parent: ONEX Technologies Group
- Website: ONEX Neorion Shipyards

Neorion is one of the oldest Greek heavy industries, located in Ermoupolis, on the Greek island of Syros. Today, it is one of the few remaining major industrial corporations in what used to be the industrial and commercial center of Greece, before being eclipsed by Piraeus in the late 19th century.

== History ==
Neorion roots go back to a traditional shipyard on that island, known for the construction of ships and boats for use during the Greek revolution of the 1820s, as well as design and building of various types of ships for the new Greek kingdom in the decades that followed. The company was officially founded in 1861 to technically support the "Greek Steamship Company", initially employing, in addition to Greek technical staff and several mechanics from Western Europe.

During the 1860s, in addition to ship building, it produced steam engines, boilers, pumps, and heavy cannons. A heavy steam engine of its own design and construction was exhibited at the International Exhibition in Paris in 1878. In 1893, the company produced its first metal steamship (the Athena).

In 1898, the name "Neorion" (an Ancient Greek word indicating a port facility for ship repair and construction) was adopted.

During the second half of the 19th century, it was one of the most important Greek heavy industries, at times second only to the Basileiades machine works in Piraeus. Other Neorion products included a variety of machinery (some of it exported), engine parts, and specialized metal constructions for the Greek industry.

In 1997, Neorion acquired another shipyard, Elefsis Shipyards, while it diversified into new fields such as the construction of luxury mega-yachts and subcontracting work for aerospace companies. The company is currently organized as the Neorion Group.

== Automobile production ==
1973 Enfield-Neorion E 8000 Bicini

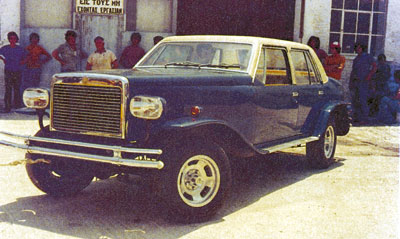
1974 Neorion Chicago 4x4

In 1972, under the ownership of the Greek millionaire Giannis Goulandris Neorion incorporated Enfield Automotive, originally a British company, owned by Goulandris, involved in the design and construction of electric cars. This led to the establishment of a new company that undertook vehicle production, "Enfield-Neorion E.P.E.", headquartered in Piraeus, and production of the cars (which had been designed in the UK by British and Greek engineers) was transferred to Syros.

A Greek designer, Georgios Michael (later credited with the design of several Greek vehicles) was employed with the new company. A "jeep-type" version designed by Michael, the E 8000 Bicini, was also introduced in 1973. A little more than 100 were built, including a few Bicini's and a version of the latter for use in mining facilities. However, none could be sold in their domestic market because of Greek government regulations. All the vehicles were exported, mostly to the UK.

Development was also undertaken for a luxury limousine with a strong 4x4 character. The Neorion Chicago was introduced in 1974. Only two complete vehicles were constructed and sold before the entire venture was terminated in 1976.

== See also ==
- Elefsis Shipyards
