= Thessaloniki Science Center and Technology Museum =

Museum in Thessaloniki, Central Macedonia, Greece

Coordinates: 40°33′45″N 22°59′43″E

- Κέντρο Διάδοσης Επιστημών και Μουσείο Τεχνολογίας
- Established: 1978
- Location: Thessaloniki, Central Macedonia, Greece
- Website: Official website

Thessaloniki Science Center and Technology Museum (NOESIS) (Greek:Κέντρο Διάδοσης Επιστημών και Μουσείο Τεχνολογίας ΝΟΗΣΙΣ) is a science and technology museum located in Thermi at the outskirts of Thessaloniki, Central Macedonia, Greece. The museum is actively engaged in the protection of the Greek technological heritage. In addition to technological exhibits on its premises, it houses various types of facilities, such as a planetarium, an amphitheatre, a simulation room, and a wide-screen cinema for the projection of educational programs.

In 2017, the museum was awarded a special mention at the Mariano Gago Ecsite Awards for welcoming refugee families and providing educational and social programming.

== History ==
It was founded in November 1978 as an association under the name Technical Museum of Thessaloniki. An influential person was Manos Iatridis, a Greek National Power Company executive in Thessaloniki and creator of the Power Company television station at the Thessaloniki International Fair in 1960. The museum was originally housed in a 500 m2 space at the Fix Plant in Western Thessaloniki, which was donated by Paraskevas Tsoukalas, one of the other founding members.

It was then moved to the east of the city to a new larger space of 1,500 m2. in Sindos, offered by the Hellenic Bank for Industrial Development (ETVA) and as of 2001 a new institution was created as the KDEMT NOESIS Foundation and relocated to the area of Thermi in a building complex of 14,000 m2. within a plot of land granted by the municipality of Thermi. Manos Iatridis was the director of the foundation until his death in 2017.

The original association of the Technical Museum of Thessaloniki continued its operation and evolved into the Hellenic Museum of Technology – Former Technical Museum of Thessaloniki, as a separate entity from the foundation KDEMT NOESIS, to which it transferred all its jurisdictions and equipment in 2002. Since then it has provided assistance to NOESIS.

== Description ==
The architecture of the building evokes Archimedes' wedge, where the elongated body of the main building is the lever that lifts the sphere of the Earth which is symbolized by the spherical building of the planetarium.

The main building houses the technology museum in which there are various permanent and temporary expositions, such as the transport exhibition hall with a number of Vintage cars, the exhibition of ancient Greek technology (modern reproductions), an exhibition of antique cameras, etc.

In the premises of NOESIS you can still find: The Technopark, the Cosmotheatre (wide-screen cinema), a digital planetarium of capacity, the simulation auditorium, a conference centre, a library, etc.

== Gallery ==
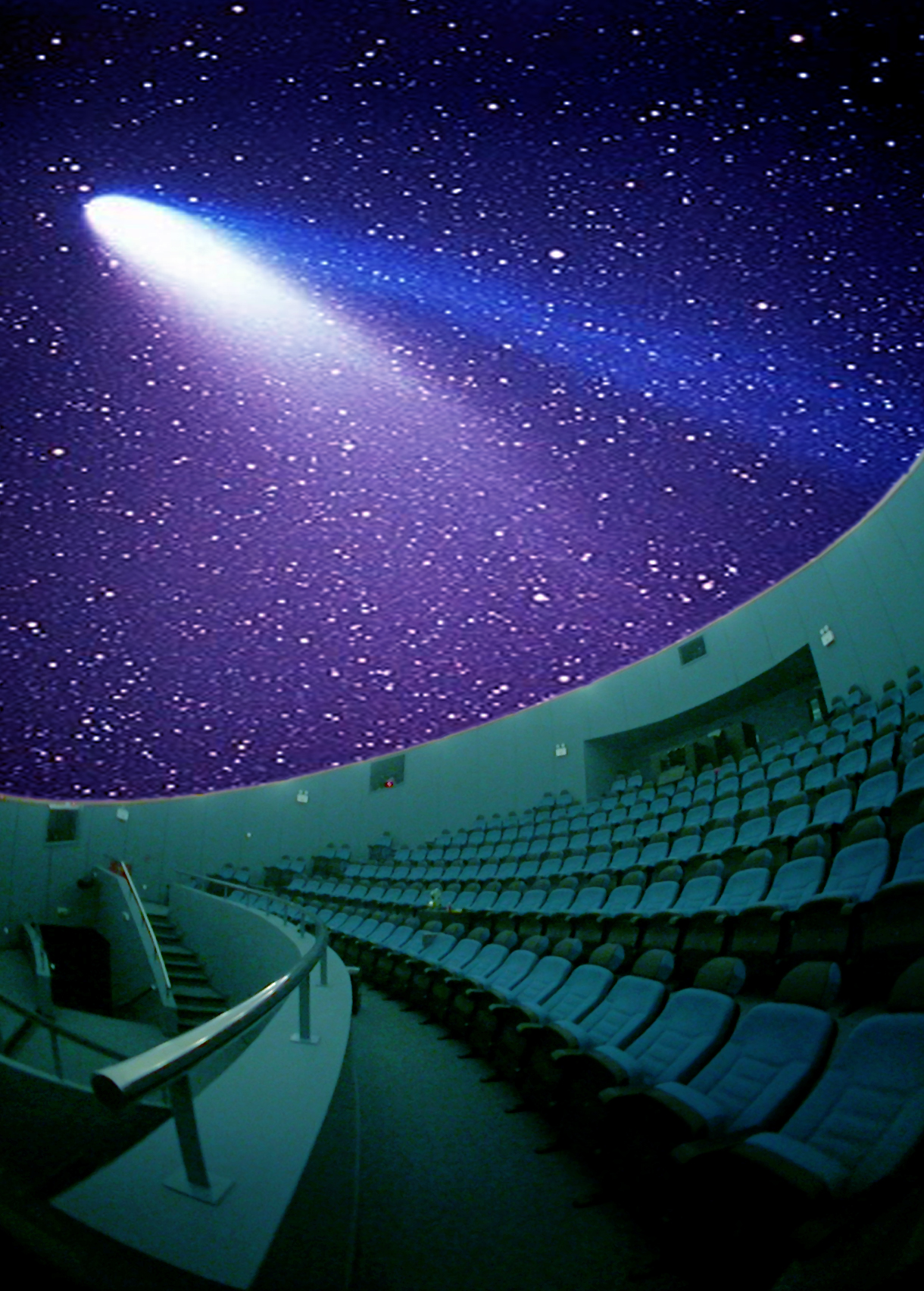
The Planetarium

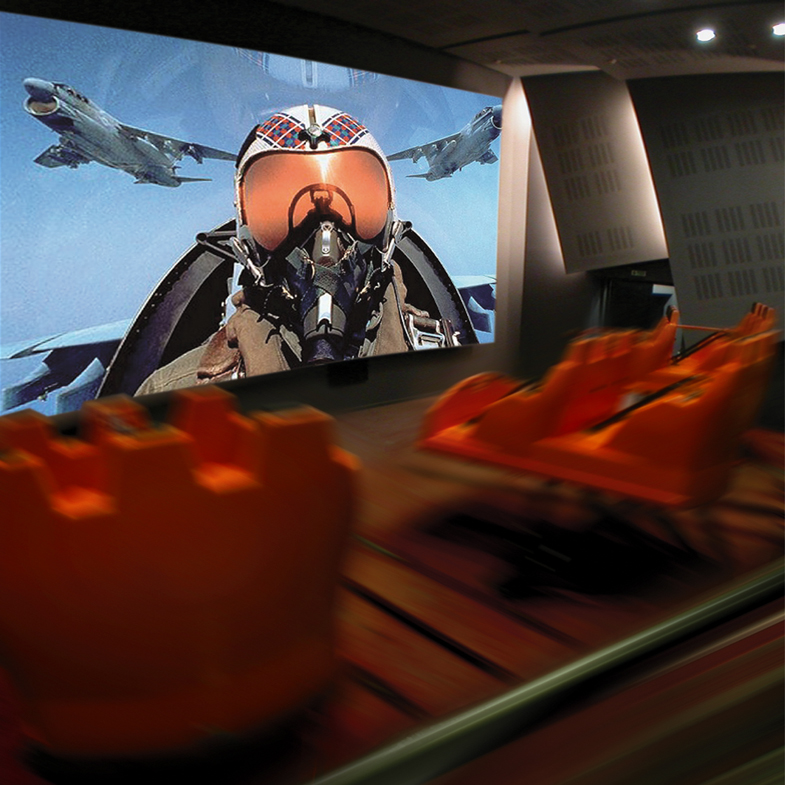
The motion Simulator

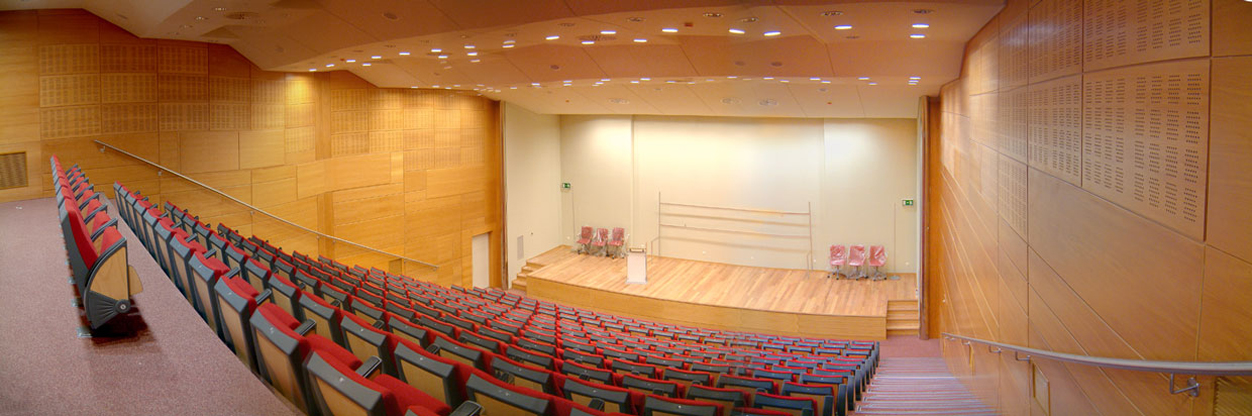
The Auditorium

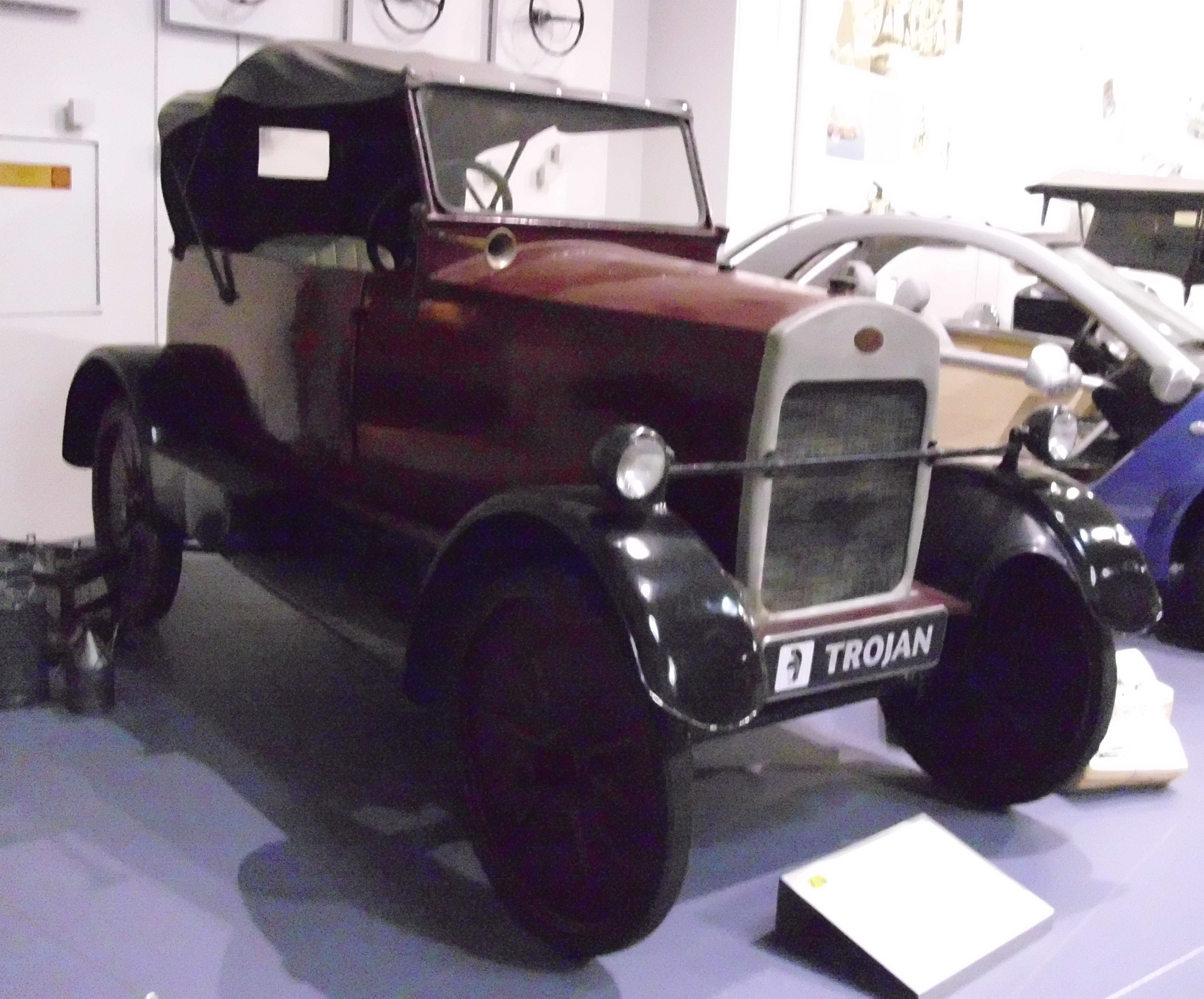
Trojan automobile (1922-1930)

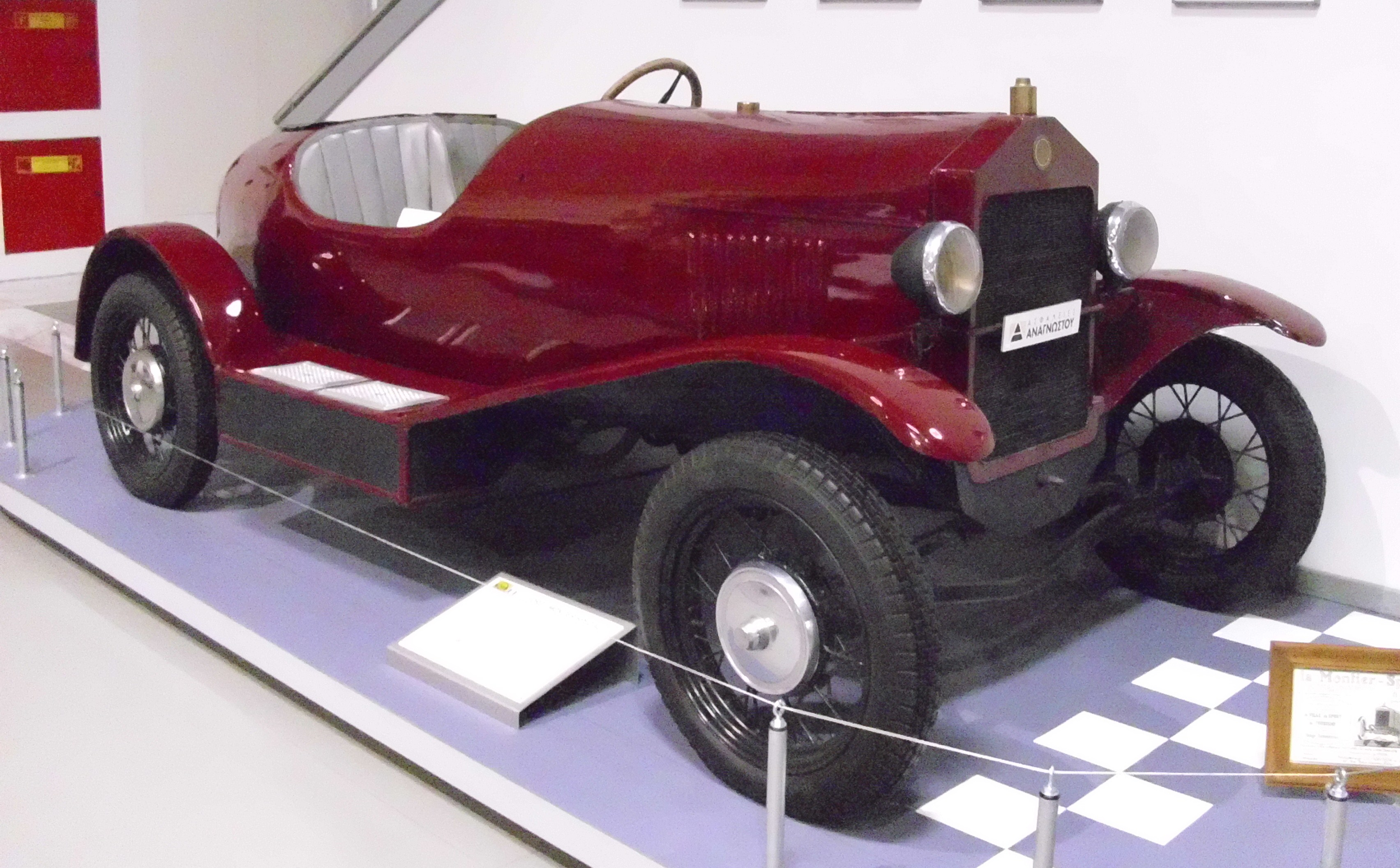
Automobile of 1924 (Montier vehicles)

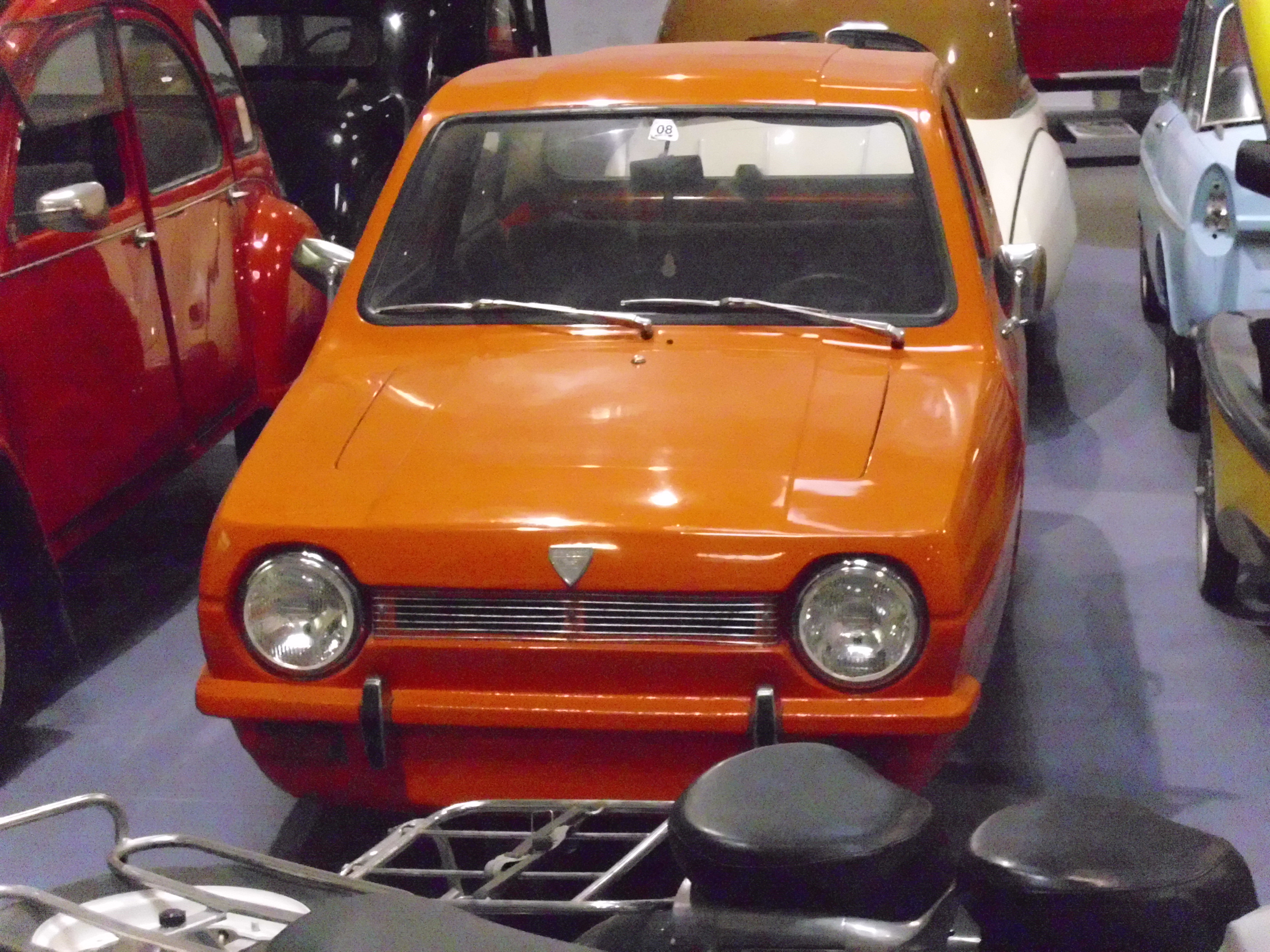
MEBEA Robin model (1974-1978)

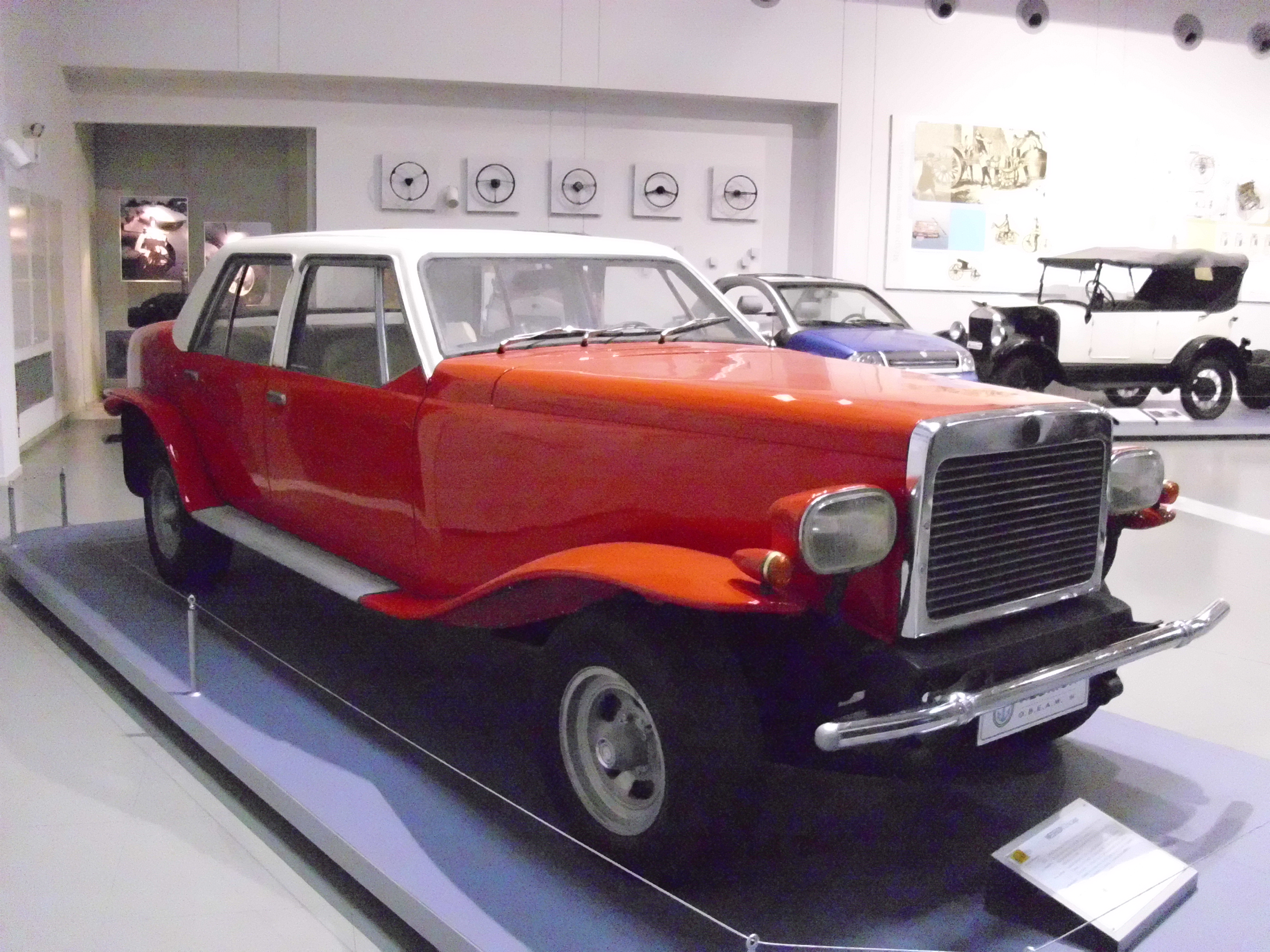
Neorion Chicago (1974)

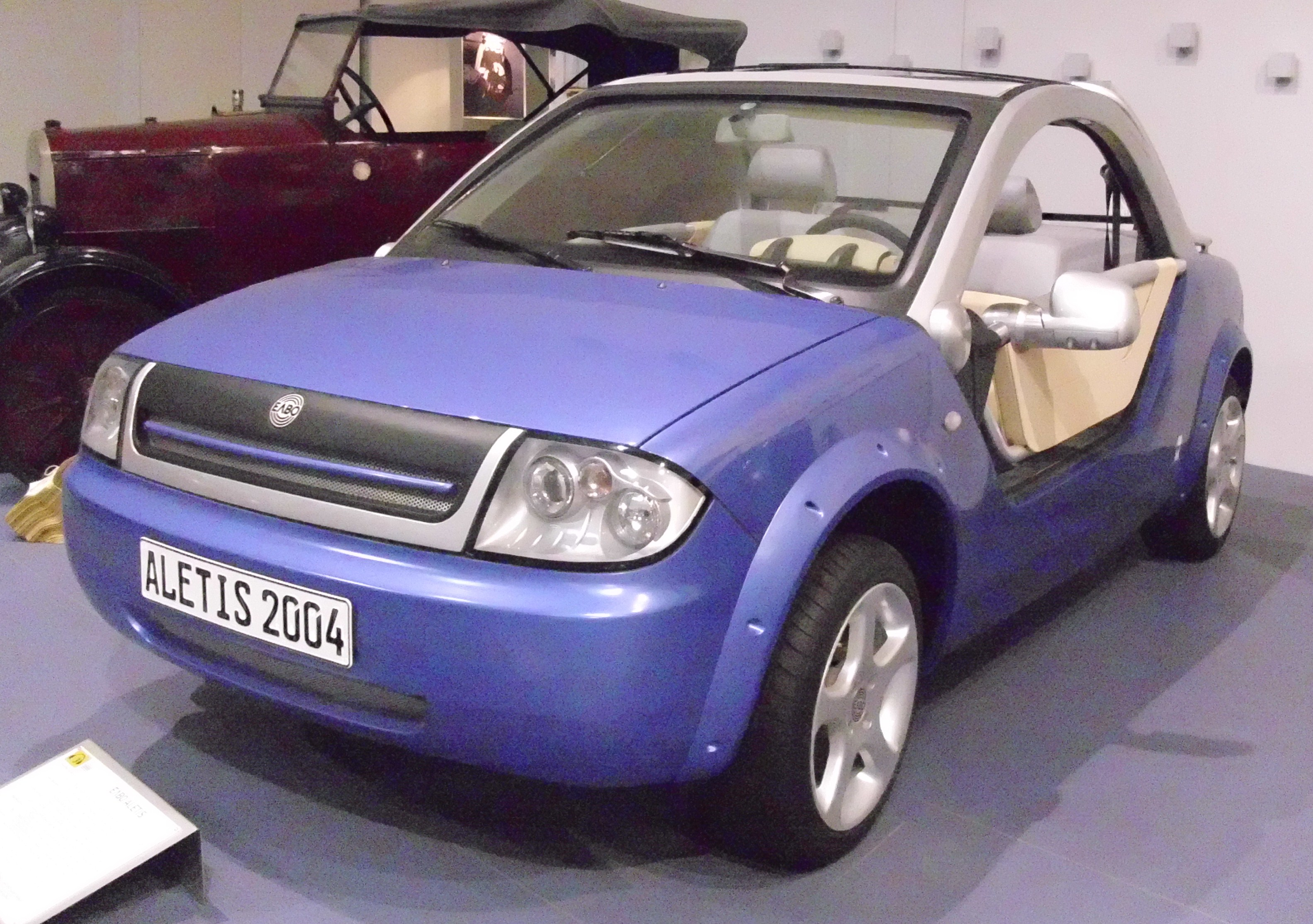
ELBO Aletis 2001 model
