= List of Greek military equipment of World War II =

This is a list of equipment of the Greek/ Hellenic Armed Forces during World War II. This list does not include weapons used by the Greek resistance during the occupation of Greece.

== Land weapons ==
- List of World War II weapons of Greece

== Aircraft ==
- List of aircraft of Greece in World War II
