= Hotchkiss M1922 machine gun =

M1922 machine gun
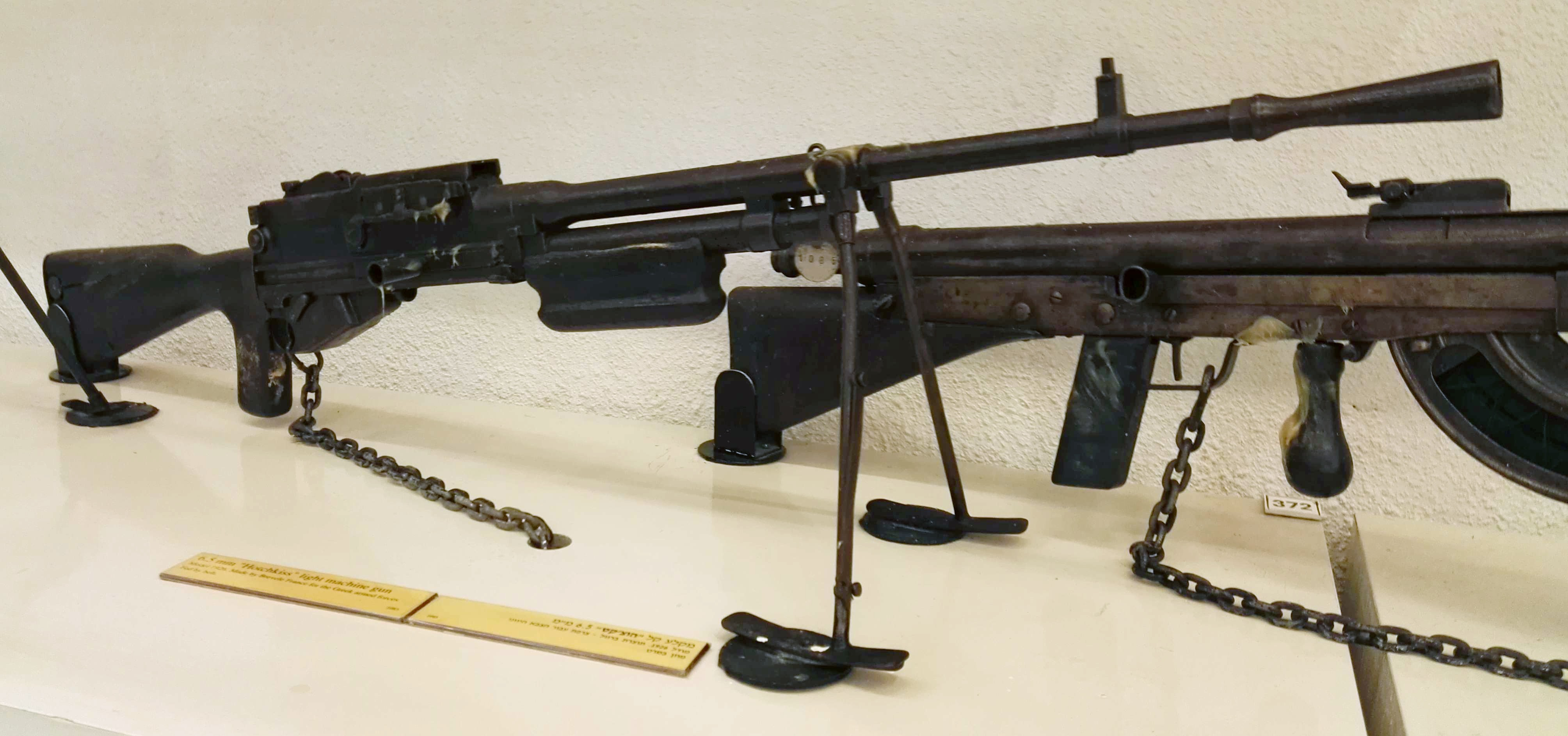
- A Greek Hotchkiss M1922 chambered for 6.5 Greek at the Israel Defense Forces History Museum
- Type: Light machine gun
- Place of origin: France

Service history
- In service: 1922–1950s
- Wars: List of wars: Rif War; Constitutionalist Revolution; Spanish Civil War; Second Sino-Japanese War; World War II; Greco-Italian War; First Indochina War

Production history
- Designer: Hotchkiss et Cie
- Manufacturer: Hotchkiss et Cie

Specifications
- Mass: 8.5 kg (18.74 lb)
- Length: 1,216 mm (47.87 in)
- Barrel length: 600 mm (23.62 in)
- Cartridge: Several, including: 6.5×54mm (6.5 Greek); 7×57mm Mauser; 7.5×54mm French; 7.7×56mmR (.303 British); 7.92×57mm Mauser; 8×50mmR Lebel
- Action: Gas operated
- Rate of fire: 450 rounds/min
- Feed system: 20-round overhead box magazine (Spanish pattern); 15-round feed strip (Officially issued and produced); 24 to 30-round feed strip (From "Hotchkiss M1914"); 30-round feed strip (From "Hotchkiss M1909")
- Sights: Iron

The Hotchkiss M1922 was a light machine gun manufactured by Hotchkiss.

It was never adopted in large numbers by the French Army; nevertheless, it was exported to many European and Latin American countries under the names Hotchkiss M1926 or Hotchkiss M1934.

== Description ==
The Fusil-Mitrailleur (FM) Model 1922 is a classic weapon with a fixed stock, pistol grip, and wooden handguard. It has a non-telescopic folding bipod. Both the cocking handle and ejection port is located on the right side. The FM's caliber varied with the user, being chambered in a wide range of calibres and fed from either 20-round overhead magazines (Spanish model) or an 15-round feed strip (Note: There's no evidence or general consensus on existence of production strips that were bigger 15 round. Hotchkiss M1922 can accept bigger strips from other Hotchkiss Machine Guns but there's no evidence provided if there were officially produced bigger strips for export models.). Its maximum range is 2,000 meters, and it had a regulator mechanism that would allow the user to adjust the rate of fire.

== Use ==
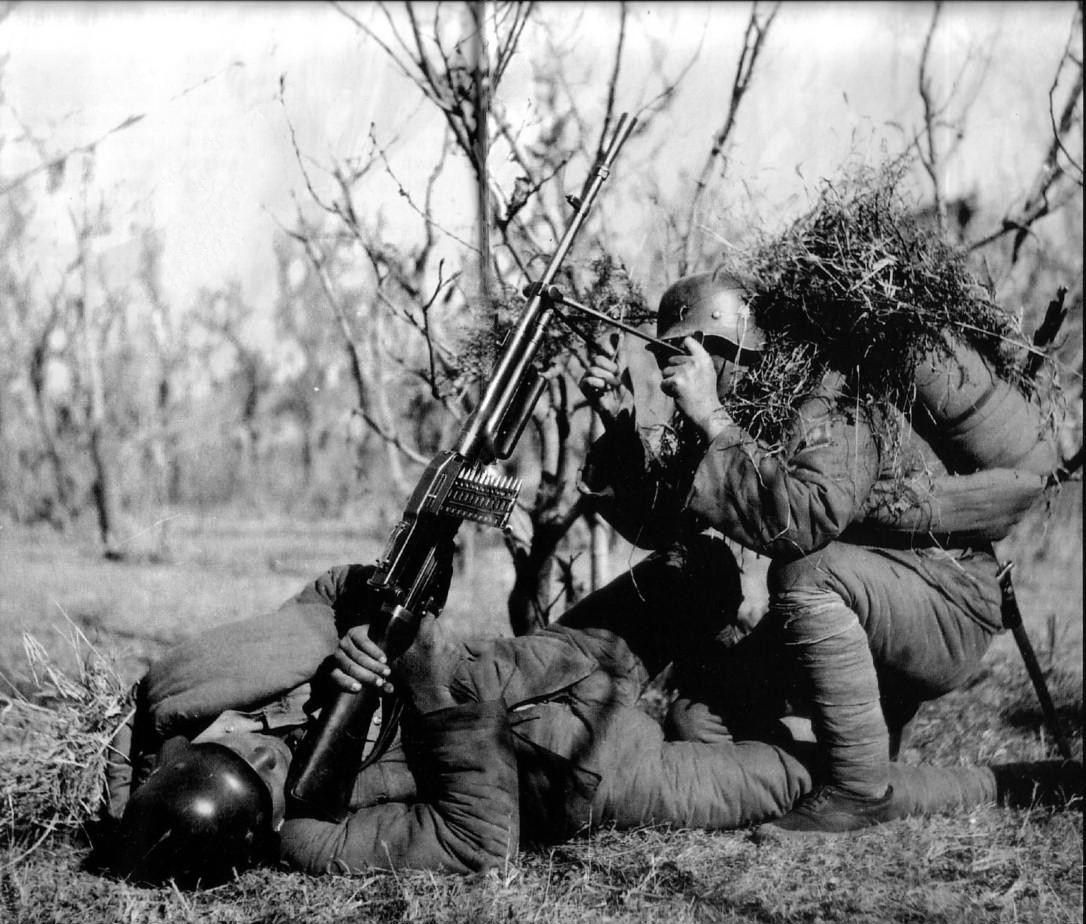
Two Chinese soldiers using a Hotchkiss M1922 machine gun

The Hotchkiss M1922 was used with great success by the Greek Army during Greco-Italian War during the fight against the Royal Italian Army. It was also used by the Chinese Nationalist Army during the Second Sino-Japanese War to fight against the Japanese Imperial Army and was frequently used in the Spanish Civil War by the Nationalist and in small numbers, the Republicans.

== Versions ==
There were several versions with different feed systems, calibers and improvements, among which were the Hotchkiss M1924 and M1926, the last of which spawned the Greek EYP Hotchkiss.

== Users ==
- Brazil — Model 1922 in 7mm Mauser
- Czechoslovakia — Received 1000 M1924 (vz. 24) in 7.92mm Mauser
- France — Mitrailleuse légère Hotchkiss type 1934, used in French Liban and French Indochina.
- Greece — Hotchkiss Model 1926 chambered in 6.5mm Greek and 7.92mm Mauser, 6000 used.
- China — Received ~3,500 in 7.92mm Mauser between 1931 and 1939
- Spain — 3,000 Hotchkiss Model 1922 O.C. (Oviedo and A Coruña), in 7×57mm Mauser
- Spanish Republic — From Spanish Army and Czechoslovakia
- United Kingdom — .303 British, only for evaluation
- Turkey — 7.92×57mm Mauser
- (North Vietnam) Viet Minh — Used during First Indochina War
