= Philippidis rifle =

1905 bolt-action rifle

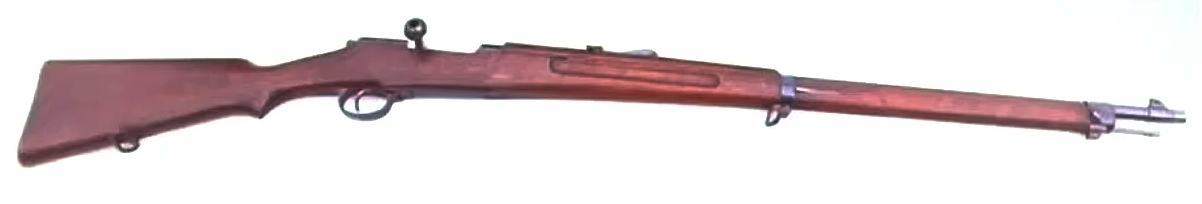
- The only surviving Philippidis rifle prototype is held by a Greek collector in the United States
- Type: Bolt-action rifle
- Place of origin: Austria-Hungary; Kingdom of Greece

Service history
- Used by: Kingdom of Greece (intended)

Production history
- Designer: Philippos A. Philippidis
- Designed: 1903
- Produced: 1925 (approved)

Specifications
- Cartridge: 6.5×54mm Mannlicher–Schönauer
- Action: Bolt action

The Philippidis rifle is a bolt-action rifle designed by Philippos A. Philippidis in 1903.

== History ==
The Mannlicher–Schönauer rifle was chosen instead of the Greek-designed Philippidis gun ('Οπλον Φιλιππίδου), itself based on an earlier model by the same Austrian manufacturer, after intense lobbying against the Greek design in 1905. This caused a serious political crisis, with accusations about "national treason" heard in the Greek Parliament. The Philippidis gun was officially approved for production in 1925, but again, the Mannlicher–Schönauer was produced (by Breda in Italy), due to (reportedly) late submission of the Greek designs to the Italian manufacturer and/or cost factors.

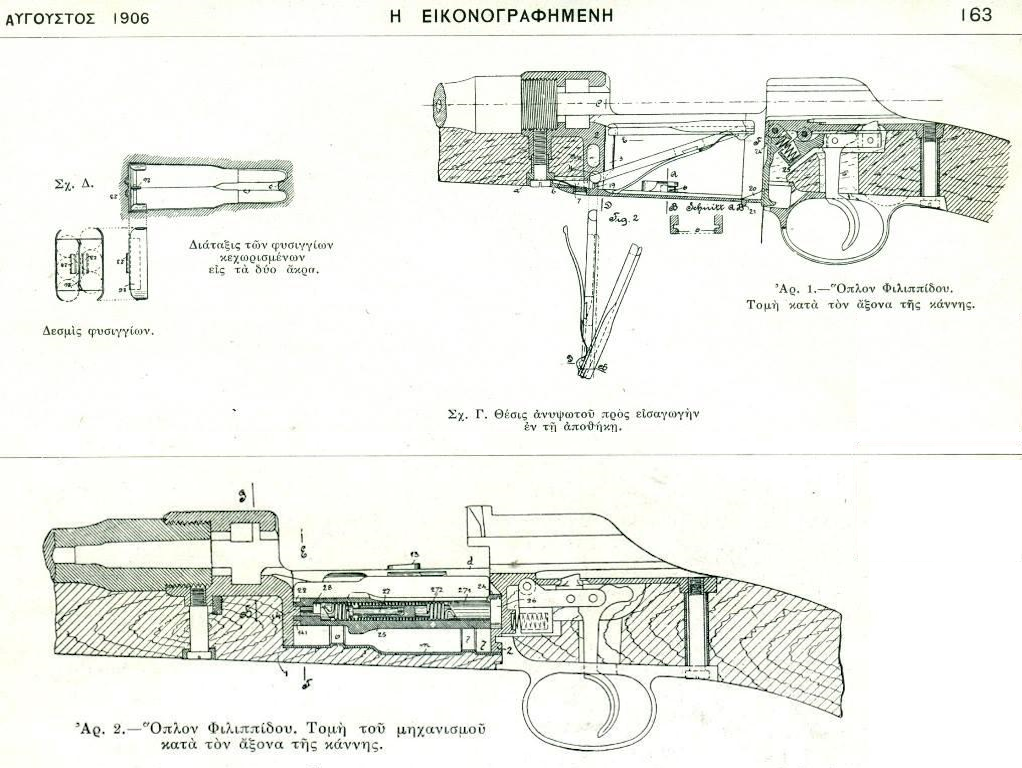
Two prototypes of the Philippidis rifle
