= 9.5×57mm Mannlicher–Schönauer =

Rifle Cartridge

- Type: Rifle, hunting
- Place of origin: United Kingdom

Production history
- Designer: Westley-Richards
- Designed: 1908
- Manufacturer: Kynoch; Other specialist dealers
- Produced: 1910 to 1939

Specifications
- Case type: Rimless, bottleneck
- Bullet diameter: 9.55 mm (0.376 in)
- Land diameter: 9.27 mm (0.365 in)
- Neck diameter: 10.16 mm (0.400 in)
- Shoulder diameter: 11.55 mm (0.455 in)
- Base diameter: 11.89 mm (0.468 in)
- Rim diameter: 11.89 mm (0.468 in)
- Case length: 57.15 mm (2.250 in)
- Overall length: 74.9 mm (2.95 in)
- Maximum pressure: 305.0 MPa (44,240 psi)

Ballistic performance
Bullet mass/type	Velocity	Energy
270 gr (17 g) Round nose	2,150 ft/s (660 m/s)	2,768 ft⋅lbf (3,753 J)
- Test barrel length: 25"; Source: Kynoch

The 9.5×57mm Mannlicher–Schönauer (MS) cartridge was adopted for the M-1910 MS rifle and carbine in 1910. (Note: The name Schoenauer is correctly spelled Schönauer with an “umlaut” over the “o” in German, although the rifles themselves are stamped with the German umlauted ""oe"") The 9.5×57mm MS is also known as the 9.5×56mm MS, the 9.5×56.7mm MS, and the .375 Rimless Nitro Express (RNE) × 2¼ (primarily in England). The cartridge may have been created by Westley-Richards and Eley in 1908 (rather than by the Oestereichischer Waffenfabrik-Gessellschaft, Steyr (OWS) (Austrian Arms Manufacturer-Association, Steyr)), but no production rifles in this caliber have been found prior to the M-1910. This development by or on behalf of Steyr was probably an answer to the development by the noted British gunmaking firm of Holland & Holland in 1905 of their .400/375 Belted Nitro Express, designed for their specially modified Mannlicher–Schoenauer rifle (they imported the actions from Austria, but built the rifles in house). Whether the development of the 9.5×57mm Mannlicher–Schoenauer cartridge originated with OWS or with Holland's British competitor, Westley Richards certainly was the principal promoter of the new 1910 Model Mannlicher–Schoenauer rifle as evidenced by catalogs of the time. The 9.5×57mm MS is the last pre-war proprietary cartridge by Steyr and their most powerful until the recent advent of the .376 Steyr, which has its antecedents in the 9.5×57mm.

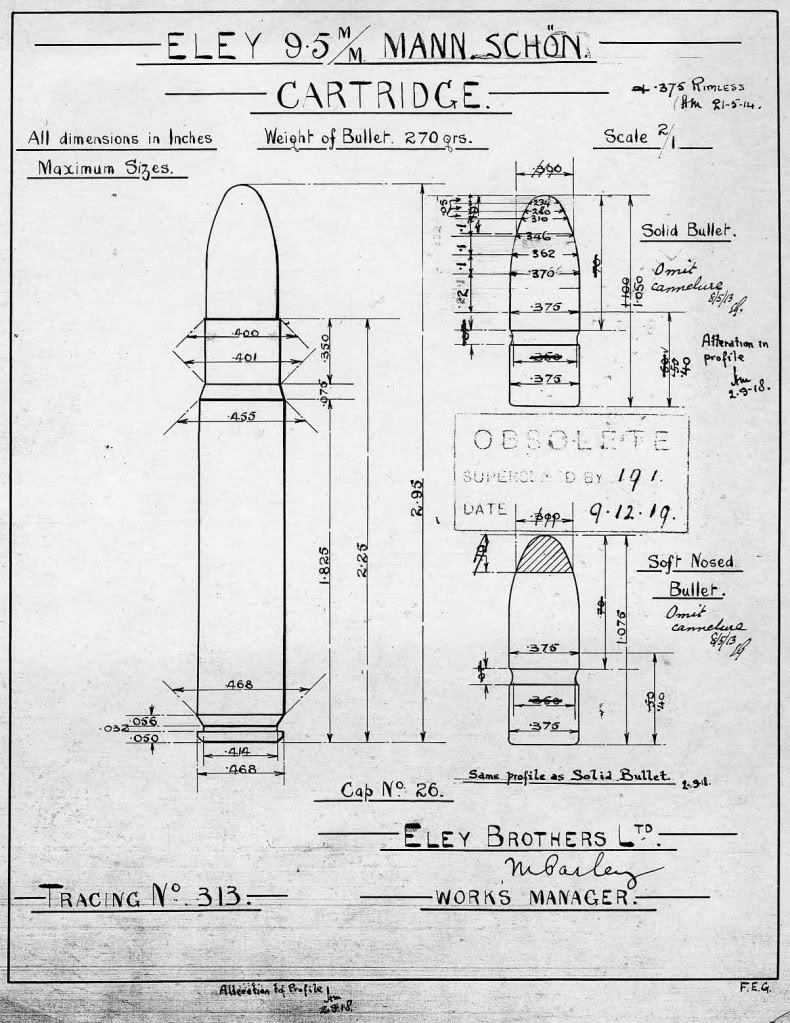
9.5×57mm Mannlicher–Schönauer Cartridge Drawing (Eley - 1919)

== Loads ==
Factory loads were manufactured with a 270-grain (17 g) round-nose bullet at from 2,150 ft/s (660 m/s) (from the carbine) to 2,250 ft/s (690 m/s) (from the rifle). This performance ranks the 9.5×57mm on par with or superior to similar medium-bore cartridges such as the 9×56mm Mannlicher–Schoenauer, 9×57mm Mauser, .35 Winchester, .348 Winchester, .358 Winchester and 9.3×57mm. It was superior to the well-established British .375 Flanged Nitro Express, which only developed about 1950 to 2000 fps with the same weight of bullet, and trod closely on the heels of the well-regarded .400/350 Nitro Express and .400/360 Westley Richards cartridges, howbeit these benefitted from a bullet weight of significantly greater sectional density. Since this is normally shot from a 6.5 pounds (2.9 kg) rifle, the recoil is quite vigorous. The recoil energy of 30 ft⋅lbf (41 J) from this combination is about 50% more than an average American .30-06 rifle, but light by the standards of other African game cartridges such as the .375 H&H Magnum.

Ammunition and arms catalogs of the era describe a standard loading of a 270 gr "metal-covered" (i.e., jacketed) soft nose bullet. No other bullet weights or patterns are shown, although it is possible that full-metal-jacketed or other patterns or weights of bullets may have been produced at some time. Curiously, Kynoch lists loads for the 9.5mm Mannlicher–Schoenauer with a 45 grain charge of smokeless propellant (for a muzzle velocity of 2200 fps) and the ".375 Rimless Nitro Express" with a reduced 43 grain charge (for a muzzle velocity of 2100 fps). This may have reflected the differences in the regulation of the sights by the respective manufacturers and distributors, between Westley Richards for the higher powered Mannlicher–Schoenauer loading and the trade rifles with the generic .375 Rimless Nitro Express loading.

Cartridge cases are available from specialist dealers in obsolete cartridges. However, cases are easily reformed from the nearly identical 9.3×57mm, or the 7.92×57mm Mauser by resizing in full-length dies and trimming to length. Both aforementioned cartridges remain in production and continuing popularity in Europe which ensures a ready supply. There are no unusual considerations for handloading this cartridge. Any modern bullet of .375 caliber from 235 to 270 grains will work well, although bullets that intrude deeply into the case may be undesirable due to the relatively small case volume. Heavier bullets of 300 to 350 grains are not advised for hunting because the muzzle velocity will be about 2000 fps or less, which is insufficient to provide normal expansion in most contemporary bullets (which have much thicker jackets than bullets manufactured in the early 20th century).

== Hunting ==
The cartridge was primarily intended for European game such as red stag, moose and boar. At this time gun makers were attempting to adapt the older straight wall Nitro Express cartridges from the late 19th century used in single and double rifles, to the new magazine-fed bolt action rifles such as the Mauser and Mannlicher. Cartridges like the 9.5x57 M-S and the 9.3x62 reproduced the performance of the .375 Nitro Express and the 9.3x74 in modern repeating rifles. Hunters who used them in Europe took them on safari in Africa and their ability to handle big game hunting in Africa or India cemented their performance in the minds of hunters of the period. Although the 9.5×57mm MS was considered light for three of the “big five” in Africa (elephant, cape buffalo, and rhinoceros), it could handle any thin-skinned game including the dangerous ones. The 9.5x57 Mannlicher Schoenauer in the model 1910 rifle was considered by some African guide-hunters to be an ideal lion gun and cartridge combination in the years just prior to World War I. Finn Aagaard recorded that the 9.5x57 Mannlicher Schoenauer remained popular with settlers in Kenya in the 1950's and 60's for general plains game hunting.

Part of the reason the combination was highly regarded was the handling characteristics of the rifle it was chambered in. The Model 1910 was available in rifle and carbine form and a take down version was popular. The Mannlicher Schoenauer model 1910 was light, well balanced, and had front and rear sights that were ideal for “snap” shooting. The front sight was a “German silver” bead that was visible in almost any light and the 2-position, folding rear sight was a wide spaced “V” (which made it easy to align the sights quickly). There were numerous alternate sights available from the factory and the aftermarket. The power of the cartridge (for stopping dangerous game quickly) was also praised.

== History ==
Introduced in the 1910 Model rifle, the cartridge was quickly overshadowed performance-wise by the .375 H&H Magnum when it became available two years later (in 1912), albeit the latter was only available in magnum length or specially modified Mauser rifles and therefore remained for some time a more expensive alternative. The 9.5×57mm was still used in Africa into the 1950s.

As with most of the proprietary Mannlicher–Schoenauer cartridges, with the notable exception of the 6.5×54mm MS, the 9.5×57mm MS cartridge has not been produced by anyone other than Kynoch since the beginning of World War II (and only sporadically from them and their successors).

== See also ==
- Mannlicher–Schönauer
- Cartridge (firearms)
- List of rifle cartridges
- 9 mm caliber
