= Kouppas =

1972 Kouppas Road Roller

Kouppas, also spelled in English as Couppas or Coupas (Μηχανοποιείον Αχιλλέας Κούππας Α.Ε., Achilleas Kouppas Machine Manufacturing A.E.), has historically been the most famous Greek industrial machinery and equipment manufacturer, founded in Piraeus in 1882.

Kouppas is mostly known for equipping factories throughout Greece as well as ventures in the Middle East, undertaking design and construction of specialized heavy machinery. Areas of specialization included oil refinery equipment (utilized in ventures in Iran, Iraq, Egypt, Tunisia and Congo-Brazzaville) and boilers (its best known commercial product). In 1972 it introduced a 14-tonne road roller model, powered by a Skoda Diesel engine.

Kouppas was one of the companies most seriously affected by the 1980s crisis in Greek industry. After serious financial trouble, it ceased operations in 1987 (105 years after its foundation), becoming one more historic Greek company to go out of business. In 1995 its facilities were acquired by BIEX Metal Constructions A.E. and Procter & Gamble Hellas A.E.
