= Rigopoulos rifle =

Greek modification of the Mannlicher-Schönauer rifle

- Type: Automatic rifle
- Place of origin: Kingdom of Greece

Service history
- Used by: Greece (intended)
- Wars: World War II

Production history
- Designer: Rigas Rigopoulos
- Designed: 1940-1941

Specifications
- Length: 1,226 mm (48.3 in)
- Barrel length: 725 mm (28.5 in)
- Cartridge: 6.5×54mm Mannlicher–Schönauer
- Feed system: 20-round detachable box magazine
- Sights: Front barleycorn; rear tangent adj. from 200 to 2000 m

The Rigopoulos rifle or known as Rigopoulos conversion is a Greek modification of the Mannlicher-Schönauer Y1903/14 rifle designed by Hellenic Army officer Rigas Rigopoulos in 1940. The modification permitted automatic fire and the rifle was manufactured by and for the Greek military.

== History ==
Lieutenant Rigas Rigopoulos was awarded a patent in February, 1940 for a military gun design with a novel firing mechanism for high rate of fire. The Hellenic Ministry of Defense expressed interest for the invention, and organized a series of tests in Volos, intending to utilize the new mechanism to transform existing Mannlicher–Schönauer rifles into more modern weapons. The tests were never completed due to the outbreak of war with Italy and, thus, Greece's entry into WWII.

=== Design ===
Rigopoulos had designed a detachable assembly that included, among other things, a different type of movable bolt, a 20-round magazine, and a mechanism for the recoil and resetting of the bolt carrier, which converted the weapon into an automatic fire weapon. This portable mechanism, according to the inventor's reasoning, could be carried with them by soldiers and, whenever deemed necessary, adapted to their weapon. This would essentially make it possible to use the weapons as machine guns, significantly increasing the firepower of their unit.

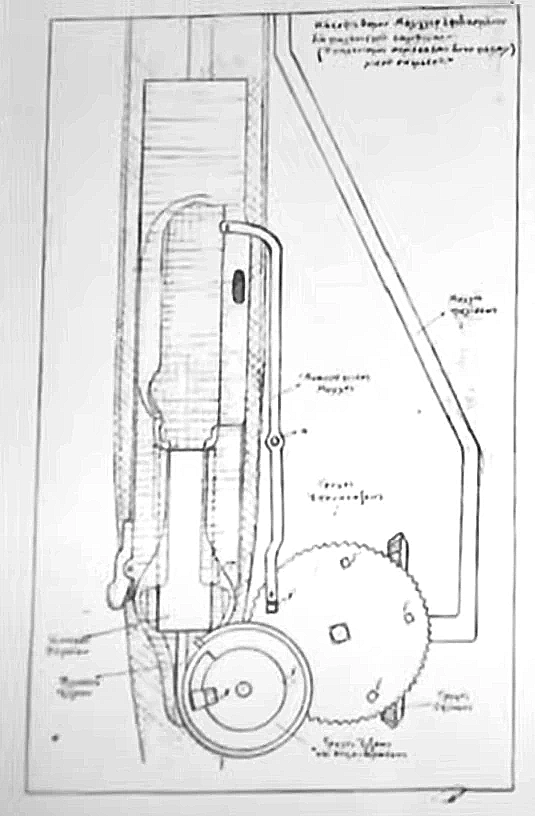
Automatic mechanism of Rigopoulos rifle.
