= Mannlicher–Schönauer =

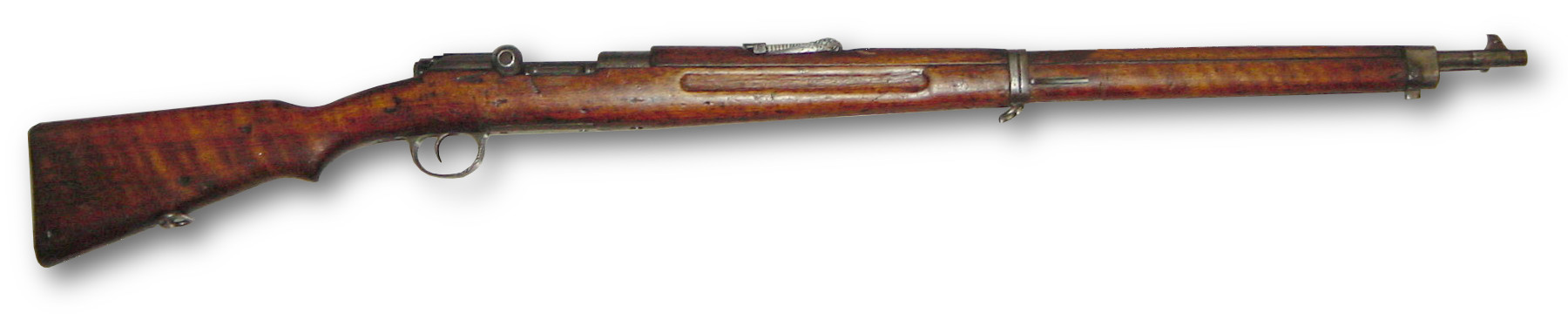
- Mannlicher–Schönauer rifle Y1903/14
- Type: Bolt-action rifle
- Place of origin: Austria-Hungary

Service history
- In service: 1903–1941
- Used by: See Users
- Wars: First Balkan War; Second Balkan War; World War I Greco-Turkish War; World War II; Greco–Italian War; Greek Resistance; Greek Civil War

Production history
- Designer: Otto Schönauer & Ferdinand Mannlicher
- Designed: 1900
- Manufacturer: Steyr, Breda
- No. built: ~350,000
- Variants: M1903; M1903/14

Specifications
- Mass: 3.77 kg (8.3 lb) (1903/14); 3.58 kg (7.9 lb) (1903/14 Carbine)
- Length: 1,226 mm (48.3 in) (1903/14); 1,025 mm (40.4 in) (1903/14 Carbine)
- Barrel length: 725 mm (28.5 in) (1903/14); 525 mm (20.7 in) (1903/14 Carbine); 450 mm (18 in) (Model 1903)
- Cartridge: 6.5×54mm Mannlicher–Schönauer (military and Model 1903); 8×56mm Mannlicher–Schönauer (Model 1908); 9×56mm Mannlicher–Schönauer (Model 1905); 9.5×57mm Mannlicher–Schönauer (Model 1910).30-06 Springfield, .243 Winchester and .270 Winchester (Model 72)
- Action: Bolt action
- Muzzle velocity: 678 m/s (2,223 ft/s)
- Effective firing range: ~600 metres (660 yards)
- Feed system: 5-round stripper clip, integral rotary magazine
- Sights: Front barleycorn Rear tangent adjustable from 200 to 2000 m

The Mannlicher–Schönauer (sometimes Anglicized as "Mannlicher Schoenauer", Hellenized as Τυφέκιον/Όπλον Μάνλιχερ, Óplon/Tyfékion Mannlicher) is a rotary-magazine bolt-action rifle produced by Steyr Mannlicher for the Greek Army in 1903 and later used in small numbers by the Austro-Hungarian Army. Post-war it was sold for civilian use.

== Design characteristics ==
In the late 19th century, the classic Mannlicher designs for the Austro-Hungarian army like the M1886 were based on the en-bloc magazine, a straight-pull bolt mechanism, designed for obsolete large caliber cartridges. Following the introduction of smokeless powder in the Lebel rifle at the end of the century, the Steyr factory worked on new Mannlicher designs, using more effective modern cartridges. These were offered for the consideration of the Austro-Hungarian Army, for export to other armies and for to civilian market.

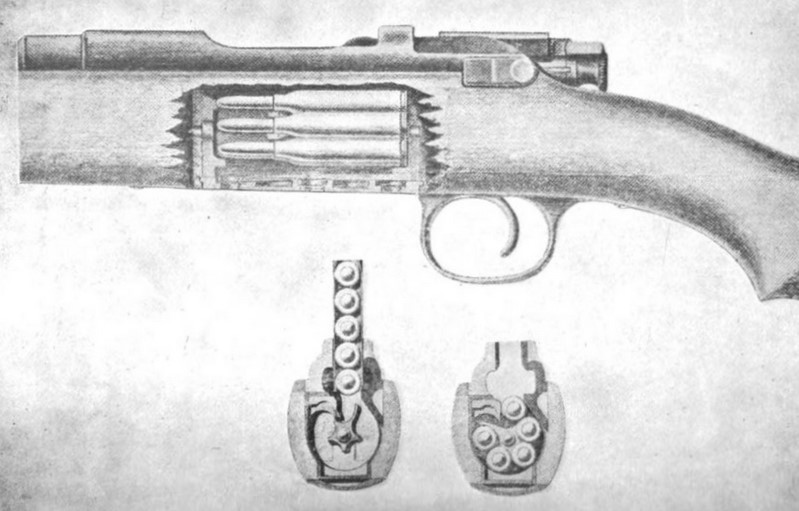
Sketch showing the magazine system of the Mannlicher–Schönauer

The bolt action was originally designed by Louis Schlegelmilch (based on the Mauser 71), OEWG had a license and tooling for it due to Gewehr 88 production (see below). However the Mannlicher magazine system in it was replaced with the rotary magazine by his protégé Otto Schönauer of the Österreichische Waffenfabriksgesellschaft (Austrian Arms-Manufacturing Company; now Steyr Mannlicher). The latter first patented a spool magazine in 1886 and a second design, shown on the sketch, was patented in 1900 together with Mannlicher.

While the more famous Mannlicher M1895 used the less common straight-pull bolt, the Mannlicher–Schönauer had a conventional turn-bolt, derived from the Gewehr 88 (and reminiscent of other typical military bolt-action rifles of the time). The Mannlicher–Schönauer may be identified by the split in the rear of the receiver which allows the bolt handle to pass through and doubles as an emergency locking lug when closed, in case of a failure to the primary locking lugs. The characteristic that sets the design apart from earlier members of the family is the Schönauer's rotating spool magazine.

The original design, introduced at the World Fair as the Model 1900, allowed the development of either service or sport versions depending on market response. While small sporting outlets, such as William Evans of London, purchased actions for their rifles, only the Greek Army expressed interest in the design for military use and their specifications may have dictated some of the rifle's characteristics. The Greek Army requested two main versions, one long rifle of 1230 mm (total length of the rifle) and a carbine of 950 mm length for use by cavalry and non-infantry troops, both termed Model 1903. The weight was around 3.75 kg, the magazine capacity was five rounds and was fed by stripper clips, or single rounds. The 6.5×54mm MS cartridge had traits of a hunting round, even though it had a projectile with a rounded point, it was ballistically efficient, improving accuracy at moderate ranges. The rifle was manufactured to a high standard and was made with tight tolerances, raising costs but improving reliability and durability. The 1903 Mannlicher–Schönauer had iron sights similar to those of the Mannlicher M1895, graduated up to 2000 m.

== Service history ==
The military Mannlicher–Schönauer was not a commercial success, as it did not attract many contracts for export. The unusual design calibre, cost and the fact that no major power adopted it, contributed to its lack of sales. Other foreign Mannlicher clients opted for versions of the issue rifle of Austria-Hungary, the M1895, or simpler turn-bolt rifles like the M1893 or the Dutch M1895. However, the Mannlicher–Schönauer M1903 did fulfil the specifications of the Greek Army, and the first major contract was signed by the Greek Government in 1903. This contract was part of a major modernisation plan as until then the Greeks were using single-shot, black powder Gras rifles made by the Steyr factory and this may explain how Mannlicher won the order.

The Mannlicher–Schönauer rifle was the main small arm for the Greek military for some of the most active years of its modern history. Greece was almost continuously in state of war between the years 1904–1922 and 1940–1948. It appears that the Greeks issued four main contracts. The original Steyr-made Y1903 ("Y" stands for model in Greek), started being supplied in 1906–07 to a total of about 130,000 long rifles and carbines. This was the main weapon during the victorious Balkan Wars of 1912–13. A second batch of 50,000 rifles was ordered from Steyr in 1914, with the model Y1903/14, presenting minor improvements, most obviously the addition of a full handguard. These rifles were used for the first time in World War I. When the war broke out, the Austrians stopped the delivery of the rifles, as Greece chose to be neutral for the first three years. For that time Greece had 166,000 to 190,069 Mannlicher–Schönauer rifles and carbines.

Following the Asia Minor Campaign (1919–22), the Greeks were in urgent need of more weapons and tried to get Mannlicher–Schönauer rifles from every possible source in order to replace war losses (almost 50% were captured by the Turks, leaving slightly over 104,000 to 108,000 M1903 and M1903/14s). Starting in 1927, Greece received about 105,000 "Breda" marked Y1903/14/27 rifles. This Italian factory might have used Austrian captured parts and machinery, or more likely, have just mediated on behalf of the Steyr factory, due to treaty restrictions with the Austrian weapons manufacturer. These rifles saw extensive use against the Italians and Germans in World War II and many passed to the resistance fighters and thence to the combatants of the Greek Civil War that followed. The last official contract was in 1930, when they received 25,000 more Y1903/14/30 carbines, this time directly from the Steyr factory.

The Portuguese military also favoured the Mannlicher–Schönauer, but it was deemed too expensive and the locally designed Mauser-Vergueiro, which paired the Mannlicher–Schönauer bolt to a double-stack box fixed magazine copied from the Mauser 98, was adopted instead and other countries made limited use of them too. At the outbreak of World War I, a significant number of 6.5 mm Mannlicher–Schönauer rifles manufactured for Greece under the 1914 contract were sequestered and due to urgent needs, used by the Austrian Army. After the dissolution of the Austro-Hungarian Empire, these were passed on as war reparations to the original intended recipient and used by reserve units.

== Philippidis rifle, Rigopoulos rifle and Lelakis rifle ==
=== Philippidis rifle ===
The weapon was chosen instead of the Greek-designed "Philippidis gun" ('Οπλον Φιλιππίδου), itself based on an earlier model of the same Austrian manufacturer, after intense lobbying against the Greek design in 1905. This caused a serious political crisis, with accusations about "national treason" heard in the Greek Parliament. The Philippidis gun was officially approved for production in 1925, but again, the Mannlicher–Schönauer was produced (by Breda in Italy), due to (reportedly) late submission of the Greek designs to the Italian manufacturer and/or cost factors.

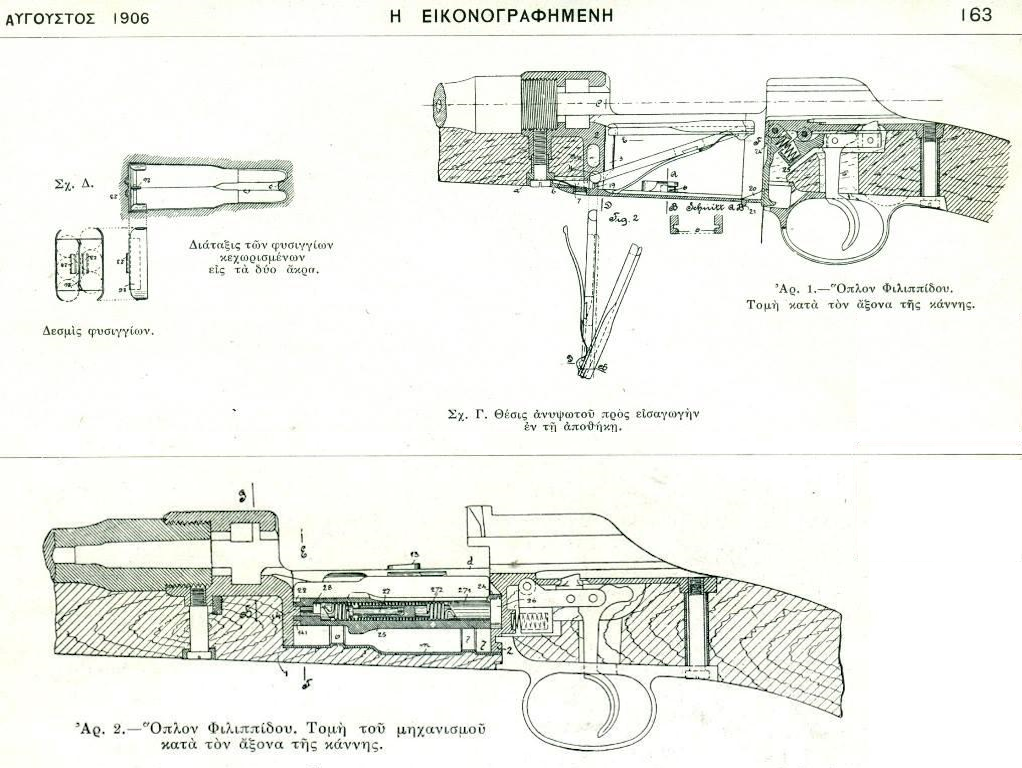
Two different prototypes of the Philippidis rifle.

=== Rigopoulos rifle ===
Lieutenant Rigas Rigopoulos was awarded a patent in February, 1940 for a military gun design with a novel firing mechanism for high rate of fire. The Hellenic Ministry of Defense expressed interest for the invention, and organized a series of tests in Volos, intending to utilize the new mechanism to transform existing Mannlicher–Schönauer rifles into more modern weapons. The tests were never completed due to the outbreak of war with Italy and, thus, Greece's entry into WWII.

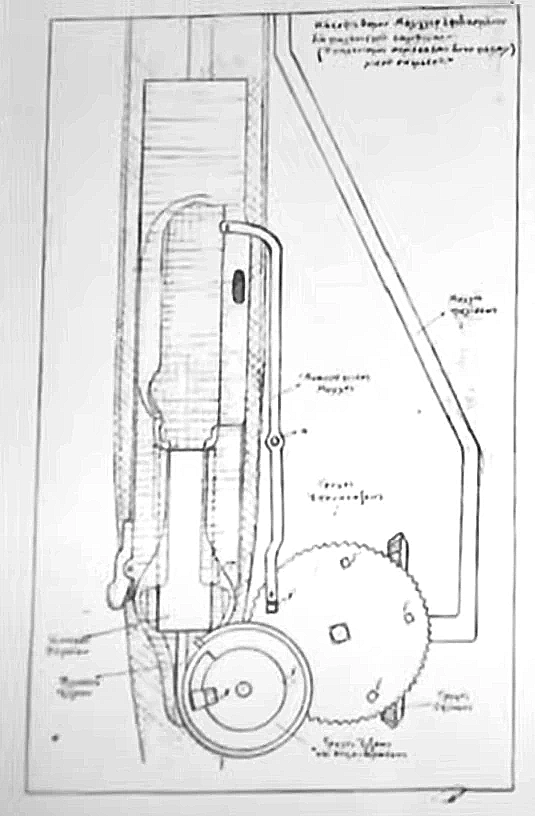
Mechanism of Rigopoulos rifle designed by Lieutenant Rigas Rigopoulos during World War II (spring 1941).

=== Lelakis rifle ===
The third improvement is the Lelakis Bolt-action rifle designed by Greek Artillery Colonel Lelakis Vassilios in collaboration with the Italian manufacturer Gnutti in 1923 where the design of the weapon was based on the Gras and Mannlicher rifles.

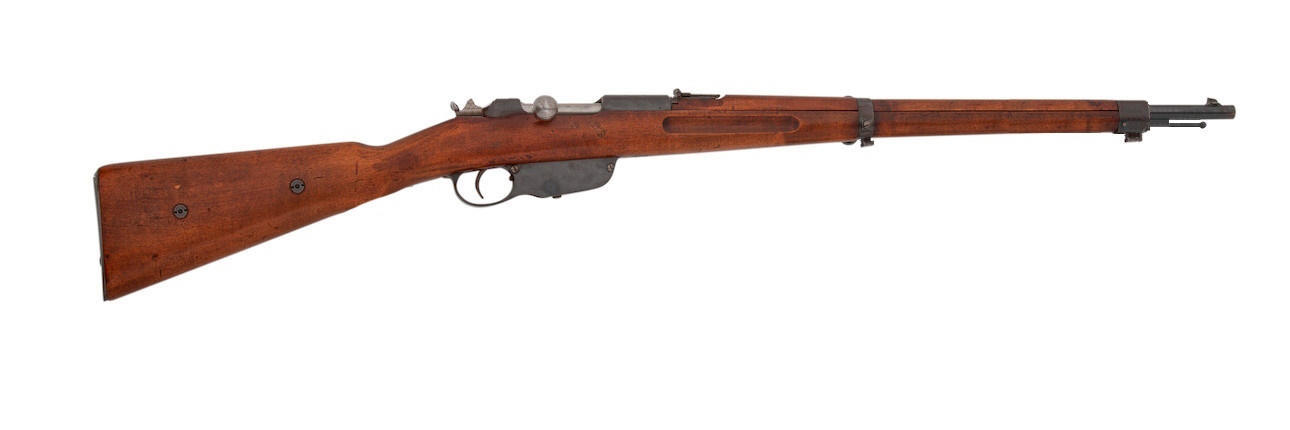
Lelakis Rifle

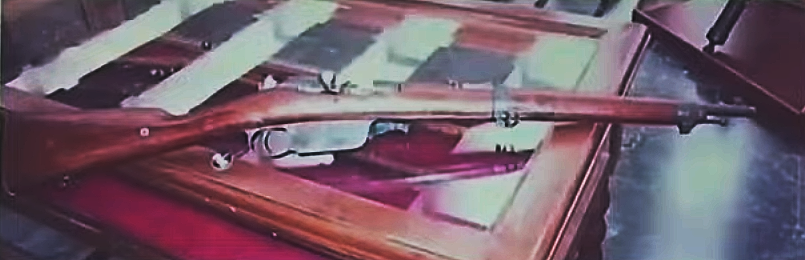
Lelakis Rifle made by Vasilios Lelakis and the Italian manufacturer Gnutti.

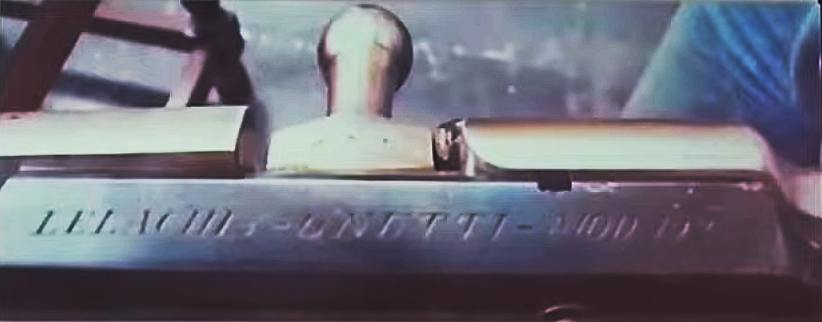
The Lelakis Rifle with the signature of the designer Vasilios Lekakis and the Italian manufacturer Gnutti.

== Sporting use ==
A civilian version of the rifle, introduced in 1903, proved popular with hunters. In Great Britain, the 6.5×54 cartridge fell into disfavour with deer-stalkers after the passage of the 1963 Deer Act as the bullet's muzzle energy failed to reach the legally required minimum value.

The most significant modification to be made to the rifle, introduced in 1925 was a lengthening of the action to accommodate cartridges requiring standard and actions such as the .30-06 Springfield and .270 Winchester, .257 Weatherby Magnum, .264 Winchester Magnum, .338 Winchester Magnum and .458 Winchester Magnum for the U.S. market, as well as 6.5×68mm, 8×68mm S, and others for the world market. The rifle continued to be manufactured in various forms (full, half-stock and take-down models) until 1972. Production was interrupted during the Second World War but re-commenced in 1950 with the MS-1950 model, which was produced in full and half stock and chambered in popular cartridges such as the .270 Winchester and .30-06 Springfield. In 1952 the bolt handle was swept back to ease use from the shoulder and by 1963 a montecarlo style cheekpiece was added to the stock to ease use of scopes. Both single and double set triggers were available.

The early years of the 20th century saw fundamentally the same rifle offered in other, larger Mannlicher–Schönauer calibres including the 8×56mm Model 1908, the 9×56mm Model 1905 and the 9.5×57mm Mannlicher–Schönauer Model 1910, but none of these sold as well as the 1903 Model in 6.5mm.

American writer Ernest Hemingway frequently used the rifle, and mentions it in some of his writings, most notably The Short Happy Life of Francis Macomber. WDM "Karamojo" Bell, a prominent elephant (ivory) hunter in Africa in the early 20th century, also used the rifle in its original 6.5×54 chambering with considerable success. The ability of the diminutive 6.5×54 cartridge to take the largest and most dangerous of the big game species, such as African elephant and Cape Buffalo, was due in the main to the high sectional density of the 6.5mm projectiles used in the rifle, although precise placing of the shot was imperative. Because the original factory loads for the 6.5×54 projectiles were long and heavy (10 g or 160 gr) relative to their diameter, they proved capable (in solid form) of very deep penetration through muscle and bone. This, coupled with the relatively low recoil of the cartridge, facilitated accurate shot placement into vital organs such as the heart or brain.

Steyr-Mannlicher currently manufactures a rifle known as the "Classic Mannlicher", which it markets as "a direct descendant of the world-famous MANNLICHER Schoenauer models". This rifle is available in several calibres. A limited-edition called the 150 year anniversary Ritter Von Mannlicher were manufactured in 1998 in the original 6.5×54mm cartridge. Although the modern "Classic" Steyr-Mannlicher rifles still incorporate some original features, the distinctive actions and rotary magazine of the original is no longer used.

High production costs and the difficulty of fitting optical sights to the rifle's split receivers eventually resulted in a decision to end production in 1972. Models produced had been: 1900, 1903, 1905, 1908, 1910, 1924, High-Velocity Sporting Rifle, 1950, 1952, 1956 Monte Carlo, 1961 Monte Carlo All-Purpose, Magnum. Due to its popularity, the rifle is still manufactured by independent gunsmiths in its country of origin and spare parts are available.

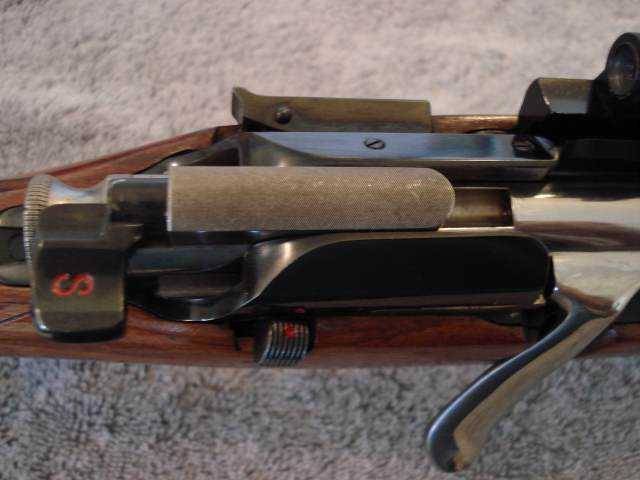
180 ° sash safety

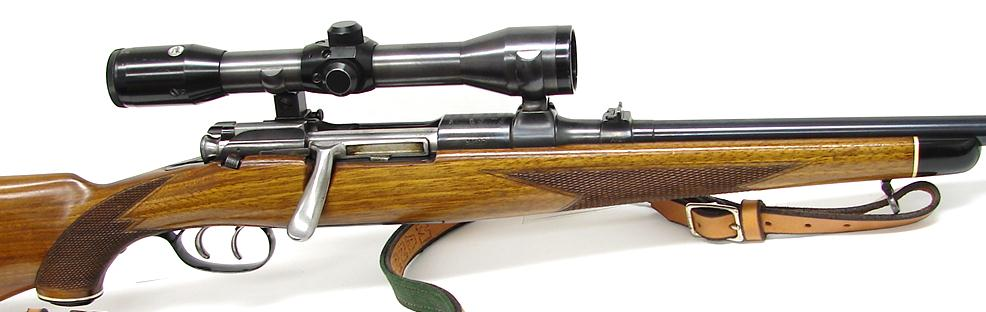
Mod GK hunting rifle

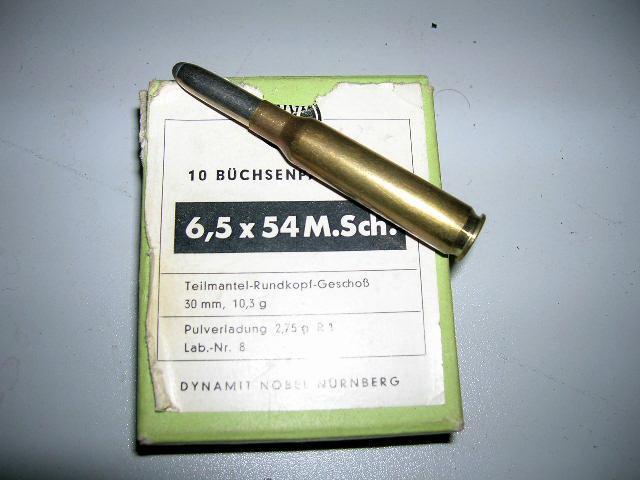
6.5×54mm cartridge box

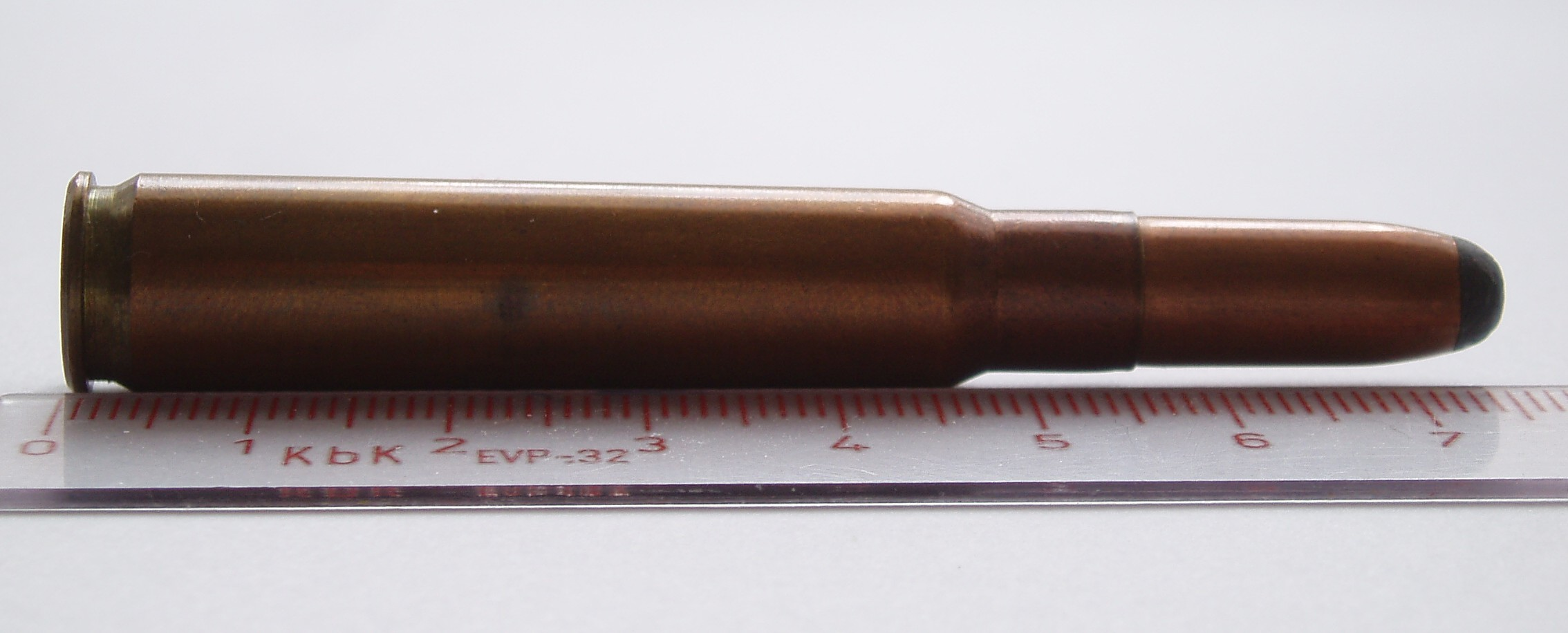
8×56mm cartridge

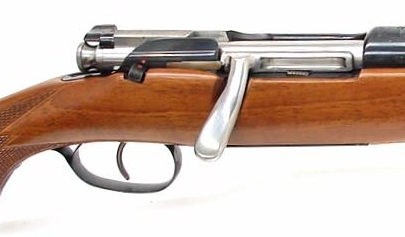
Trigger and bolt

== Users ==
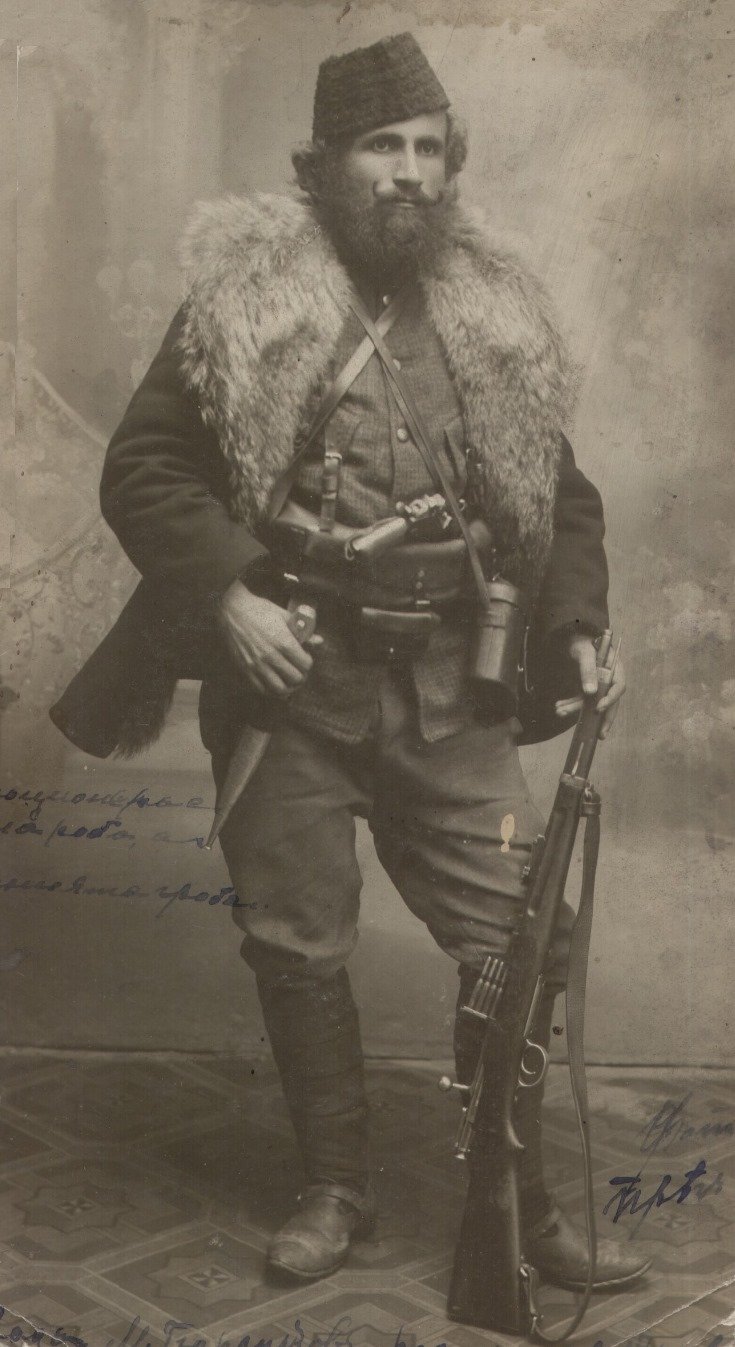
IMARO voivode Milan Gyurlukov armed with Mannlicher–Schönauer carbine

- Kingdom of Greece
- Austria-Hungary
- Principality of Albania
- Republic of China (1912-1949): Used by some warlord armies.

== Other Greek weapons ==
- Modified Hotchkiss machine gun (Medium Machine gun)
- EPK M1939 (Light Machine gun)
- Churnat Grenade (Defensive Grenade)
- Vasilopulos M1901 rifle (Bolt action rifle)
- Mylonas rifle (Falling-block rifle)
