= EYP Hotchkiss (Modified Hotchkiss machine gun) =

EYP Hotchkiss (Modified Hotchkiss)
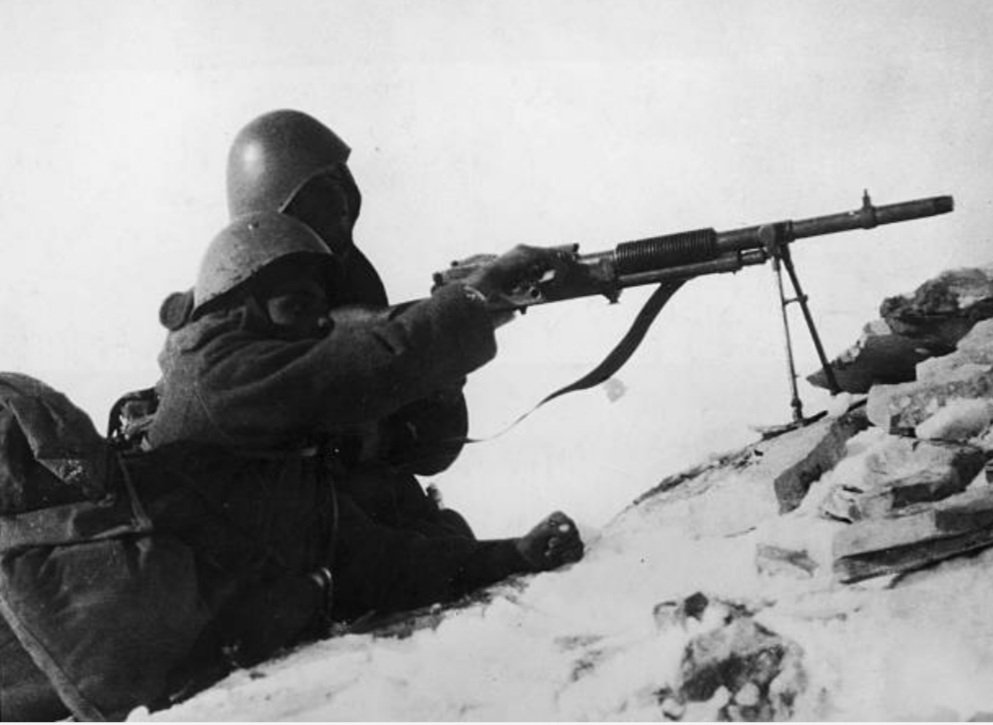
- Greek soldiers of the 8th Infantry Division in the Albanian front, 1940, with the EYP Hotchkiss medium machine gun
- Type: Medium machine gun
- Place of origin: France/Greece

Service history
- Used by: Greek Army; Italian Army (captured)
- Wars: World War II: Greco–Italian War; Allied invasion of Sicily

Production history
- Manufacturer: EYP / Hotchkiss et Cie

Specifications
- Mass: 12.75 kg (28.1 lb)
- Length: 1,216 mm (47.9 in)
- Cartridge: 7.92×57mm Mauser
- Caliber: 7.92 mm
- Action: Gas operated
- Rate of fire: 450 rounds/min
- Sights: Iron

The Modified Hotchkiss or known as EYP Hotchkiss machine gun was a Greek improvement of the French Hotchkiss M1926, in turn an evolution of the Hotchkiss M1914 machine gun.

== Design ==
Existing stock of French-built weapons was modernized before World War II by the Greek Army's War Materiel Department Eforeia Ylikou Polemou, EYP) of Athens. The main improvement involved the gun's weakest spot, its firing rate which in practice was only 220 rounds/min, about half that of contemporary machine guns. Apart from accomplishing increase to 420 rounds/min and improved stability, the same facilities undertook the production of a large number of auxiliary parts, with minor improvements. The gun was extensively used by the Greek Army during World War II.

This weapon was chambered in 7.92mm Mauser and weight 12.75 kg (28.1 lb), since it had a heavier barrel with heatsinks, for greater durability in extended operation, also it relied on a biggest weight tripod for improved stability.

Some were captured by Royal Italian Army and used in various places, such as Sicily in 1943.
