= EPK (Pyrkal) machine gun =

Greek assault rifle

EPK M1939 (Pyrkal)
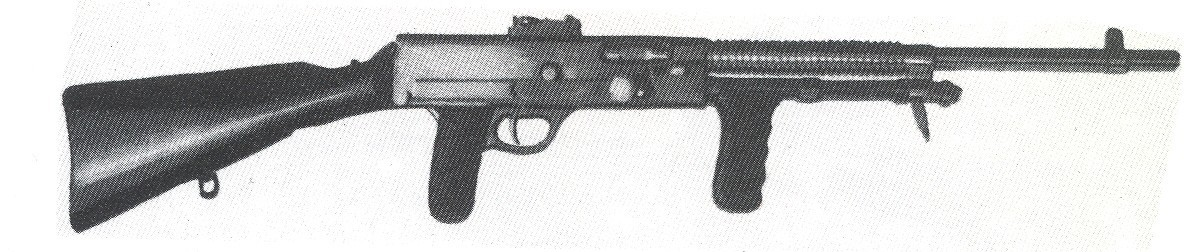
- EPK M1939 Assault Rifle
- Type: Assault rifle
- Place of origin: Kingdom of Greece

Service history
- Used by: Greece
- Wars: World War II

Production history
- Designer: Pyrkal staff
- Designed: 1939
- Manufacturer: Pyrkal

Specifications
- Mass: 4.15 kg (9.1 lb) (unloaded)
- Length: 900 mm (35 in)
- Barrel length: 400 mm (16 in)
- Cartridge: 7.92x36 mm EPK
- Caliber: 7.92 mm
- Action: gas operated
- Rate of fire: 720 rounds per minute
- Muzzle velocity: 823 m/s (2,700 ft/s)
- Effective firing range: 750 m (820 yd)
- Feed system: 30-round detachable box magazine
- Sights: Iron

The EPK machine gun was designed by EPK, a Greek defense company (in English, "Greek Powder and Cartridge Company", GPCC) later known as Pyrkal.

== Description ==
The gun's creation is connected to EPK's ambitions to become a major producer of infantry weapons. Following a proposal to the Greek government in 1937 the development of a modern machine gun of EPK's own design began, as well as construction of a small number of prototypes in 1939. The whole project, including the building of infrastructure for massive production of the gun, was underway when war with Italy broke out on October 28, 1940, subsequent events prohibited its completion. A total of no more than (probably) 10-15 were built, their fate (except for one given as a present to a member of the Greek Royal Family) remains unknown. Later publications suggested that this 7.92 mm weapon exhibited characteristics at the time closer to those of a submachine gun; others, though, including Pyrkal itself, have argued that the weapon was a very advanced design for its time, featuring pioneering elements of a whole class of future assault rifle. Its construction was close to the Thompson submachine gun with ergonomics and weight compatible with the present day Ultimax 100 light machine gun. For the feed system the weapon has a 30-round detachable box magazine that must be placed on the side of the weapon.

== See also ==
- Ribeyrolles 1918 automatic carbine
- Weibel M/1932
