= 6.5×54mm Mannlicher–Schönauer =

Austro–Hungarian rifle cartridge

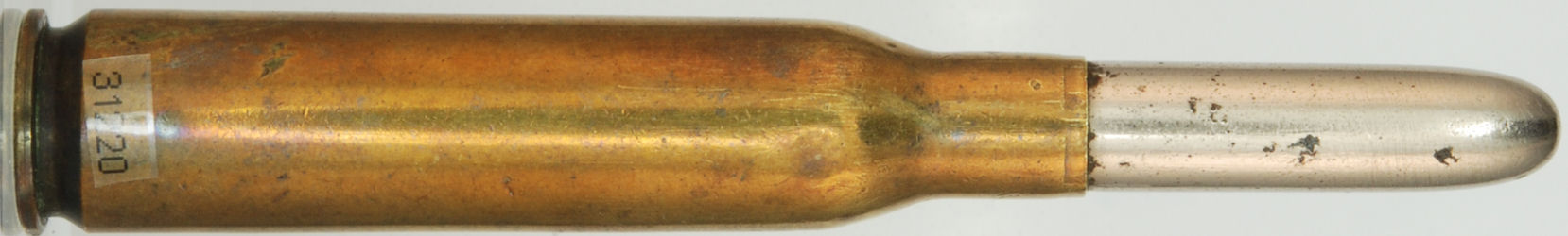
- Austrian military cartridge from 1908
- Type: Rifle
- Place of origin: Austria-Hungary

Specifications
- Parent case: 6.5×53mmR
- Case type: Rimless, bottleneck
- Bullet diameter: 6.70 mm (0.264 in)
- Land diameter: 6.50 mm (0.256 in)
- Neck diameter: 7.56 mm (0.298 in)
- Shoulder diameter: 10.87 mm (0.428 in)
- Base diameter: 11.47 mm (0.452 in)
- Rim diameter: 11.52 mm (0.454 in)
- Case length: 57.20 mm (2.252 in)
- Overall length: 77.80 mm (3.063 in)
- Case capacity: 2.88 cm^{3} (44.4 gr H_{2}O)
- Rifling twist: 1 in 9"
- Primer type: Large Rifle
- Maximum pressure (C.I.P.): 365.0 MPa (52,939 psi)

Ballistic performance
Bullet mass/type	Velocity	Energy
139 gr (9 g) Norma	2,510 ft/s (770 m/s)	1,950 ft⋅lbf (2,640 J)
159 gr (10 g) RWS	2,460 ft/s (750 m/s)	2,160 ft⋅lbf (2,930 J)
160 gr (10 g) Kynoch	2,395 ft/s (730 m/s)	2,035 ft⋅lbf (2,759 J)
135 gr (9 g) Kynoch	2,800 ft/s (850 m/s)	2,348 ft⋅lbf (3,183 J)
- Test barrel length: 17.5; Source: https://bobp.cip-bobp.org/uploads/tdcc/tab-i/tabical-en-page22.pdf

The 6.5×54mm Mannlicher–Schönauer also known as 6.5×54 Mannlicher–Schönauer Greek or simply 6.5 Greek is a 6.5 mm (.264" cal.) rimless rifle cartridge used in the Mannlicher–Schönauer rifle. It is the direct descendant of the 6.5×53mmR rimmed cartridge from the 1891 Mannlicher rifle, designed to function smoothly through the Schönauer's rotary magazine. 6.5 mm bullets are typically known for their high ballistic coefficients and sectional density, which gives them great stability in flight, resistance to wind deflection, and high penetrating power. It, along with the Mannlicher–Schönauer rifle, was first introduced in Paris at the 1900 World's Fair.

== Hunting use ==
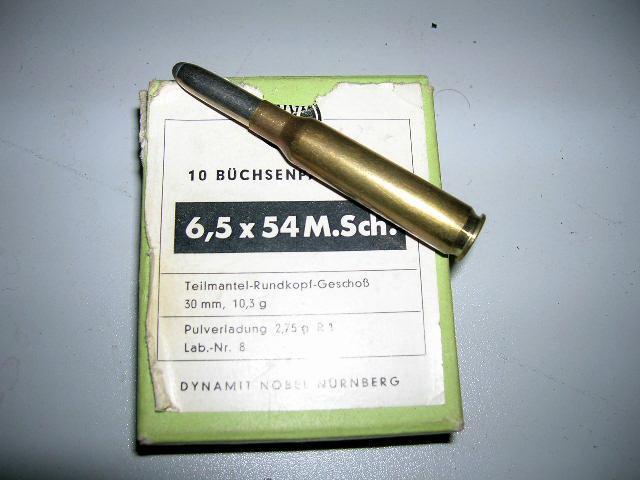
A commercial cartridge atop a 10-round box

Walter Dalrymple Maitland "Karamojo" Bell, who shot 1,011 elephants, had a high regard for the 6.5mm Mannlicher–Schoenauer, mainly because the light Mannlicher Schonauer carbines it could be chambered in. He used it for approximately 300 of these kills. Daniel Fraser of Edinburgh, Scotland built him a special, lightweight rifle in that calibre. He only set it aside when he was unable to acquire dependable ammunition for it, and returned to the Rigby-made 7mm Mauser he was using previously. Bell's legendary name has remained closely linked with the 7mm Mauser, but the 6.5 Mann.–Sch. was his first preference.

The 6.5×54mm was referred to by the writer Ernest Hemingway as the .256 Mannlicher. Though it never replaced his favorite .30-06 Springfield, he did speak highly of it as a lion cartridge, and it was the favorite of his African guide and professional hunter Phillip Percival. The Kenya game warden and naturalist A. Blaney Percival also favored the 6.5×54mm. The 6.5x54mm chambered in Mannlicher-Schonauer sporting rifles were the most common red deer stalking rifles for hunters in the UK in the first half of the 20th Century.

In part, the 6.5×54mm's reputation for good performance on large game stems from its use of a 160-grain (10 g) bullet, giving the projectile very high sectional density and therefore penetrating ability. It requires a fast rate-of-twist rifling (about 1 in 9") to stabilize such a long bullet.

== Military use ==
The 6.5×54mm Mannlicher–Schönauer cartridge was adopted by the Greek Army, along with the Mannlicher–Schönauer rifle in 1903. From 1906 until the German invasion and capitulation of Greece in April 1941, it was the standard military cartridge of the Greek Army. The Mannlicher-Carcano round was also used by Greek forces in this rifle, being with its cartridge just 2mm smaller than the desired bullet. During the German occupation it was used by Greek resistance fighters and during the Greek Civil War (1946 - 1949) by the Greek Gendarmerie, militia units and communist fighters of the Democratic Army of Greece. During the German occupation, Carcano rifles captured during World War II were also converted to 6.5×54mm Mannlicher–Schönauer and used by Greek forces.

The Austrian Army used the 6.5×54mm Mannlicher–Schönauer cartridge during World War I. Some Austrian Army regiments and the Polish Legion, were armed with confiscated Mannlicher–Schönauer rifles produced for the Greek Army. Also the Austrian Army used the 6.5×54 Mannlicher–Schönauer cartridge in converted 6.5×50mm Arisaka rifles captured from the Russian Army and in Carcano rifles captured from the italians.

== See also ==
- .260 Remington, also known as 6.5-08 A-Square, introduced in 1997
- 6.5mm Creedmoor, 6.5×48 mm, introduced in 2007
- 6.5×47mm Lapua, a 2005 cartridge that fires the same diameter and weight 9.0g bullet as the 6.5×54mm but achieves a faster muzzle velocity
- 6.5×53mmR, the rimmed Romanian and Dutch service rifle cartridge from the 1890s through World War II
- 6.5×55mm Swedish, 6.5 mm cartridge model 1894, one of the most common cartridges in modern rifles built for the Scandinavian market
