= List of machine guns =

This is a list of machine guns and their variants.

Name	Manufacturer	Image	Cartridge	Feed	Country	Year
6P62			12.7×108mm	Detachable box magazine	Russia	2010
7,62 ITKK 31 VKT	Valtion Kivääritehdas		7.62×53mmR	Ammunition belt	Finland	1931
AA-52	Manufacture d'armes de Saint-Étienne		7.5×54mm French; 7.62×51mm NATO	Ammunition belt	France	1950
AAI In-Line	AAI Corporation	—	7.62×51mm NATO	Ammunition belt	United States	1969
AEK-999	Kovrov Machinebuilding Plant		7.62×54mmR	Ammunition belt	Russia	2008
Afanasev A-12.7	Tulamashzavod; Izhmash; Kovrov Machinebuilding Plant		12.7×108mm	Ammunition belt	Soviet Union	1953
Agar gun			.58 rifle cartridge	Hopper	United States	1861
AGX-16	Dirección General de Industria Militar (DGIM)		5.56x45mm NATO	Ammunition belt	Mexico	2023
ALFA M44	Fabrica de Armas de Oviedo		7.62×51mm NATO; 7.92×57mm Mauser	Ammunition belt	Spain	1944
Ares Shrike 5.56	Ares Defence		5.56×45mm NATO	Ammunition belt Detachable box magazine Drum magazine	United States	2002
ArmaLite AR-104	ArmaLite		5.56×45mm NATO	Detachable box magazine Drum magazine	United States	
AUG HBAR	Steyr Arms		5.56×45mm NATO	Detachable box magazine	Austria	1992
Bailey machine gun			.32 rifle cartridge		United States	1875
Barnitzke machine gun		—	7.92×57mm Mauser	Ammunition belt	Germany	1945
Beretta AS70/90	Fabbrica d'Armi Pietro Beretta	—	5.56×45mm NATO	Detachable box magazine	Italy	1990
Berezin UB			12.7×108mm	Ammunition belt	Soviet Union	1937
Bergmann MG 15nA machine gun	Theodor Bergmann; Louis Schmeisser		7.92×57mm Mauser	Ammunition belt	Germany	1910
Besa machine gun	Birmingham Small Arms Company		7.92×57mm Mauser	Ammunition belt	United Kingdom	1936
Besal	Birmingham Small Arms Company		7.70×56mmR (known as .303 British)	Detachable box magazine	United Kingdom	1940
Billinghurst Requa Battery			.58 caliber	Magazine	United States	1862-1866
Blüm machine gun	Degtyarev plant		5.60×15mmR (known as .22 Long Rifle)	Drum magazine	Soviet Union	1929
Breda 30	Breda Meccanica Bresciana		6.50×52mm Mannlicher–Carcano; 7.35×51mm Carcano	Feed strip	Italy	1930
Breda 38	Breda Meccanica Bresciana		8.00×59mm RB Breda; 7.92×57mm Mauser	Detachable box magazine	Italy	1938
Breda M37	Breda Meccanica Bresciana		7.92×57mm Mauser; 8.00×59mm RB Breda	Feed strip	Italy	1936
Breda Mod. 5C	Breda Meccanica Bresciana		6.50×52mm Carcano	Feed strip	Italy	1928
Breda Model 1931 machine gun	Breda Meccanica Bresciana		13.2×99mm Hotchkiss Long	Detachable box magazine	Italy	1931
Breda-SAFAT machine gun	Società Italiana Ernesto Breda per Costruzioni Meccaniche; Breda Meccanica Bresciana; Società Italiana Ernesto Breda; Società Anonima Fabbrica Armi Torino		7.70×56mmR (known as .303 British); 12.7×81mmSR	Ammunition belt	Italy	1935
Bren light machine gun	Royal Small Arms Factory		7.62×51mm NATO; 7.70×56mmR (known as .303 British); 7.92×57mm Mauser	Detachable box magazine	Czechoslovakia; United Kingdom	1935
Brixia 1923	Brixia	—	6.50×52mm Mannlicher–Carcano	Detachable box magazine	Italy	1923
Brixia M1930	Brixia	—	6.50×52mm Mannlicher–Carcano	Detachable box magazine	Italy	1930
Brunswick SAW	Brunswick Corporation		6x45mm SAW	Ammunition belt	United States	1974
Caldwell machine gun			7.70×56mmR (known as .303 British)	Pan magazine	Australia	1915
Caracal CLMG	Caracal International		5.56x45mm NATO	Ammunition belt	United Arab Emirates	2025
CETME Ameli	General Dynamics Santa Bárbara Sistemas		5.56×45mm NATO	Ammunition belt	Spain	1975
Charlton Automatic Rifle	Charlton Motor Workshops		7.70×56mmR (known as .303 British)	Detachable box magazine	New Zealand	1941
Chauchat	SIDARME; Gladiator		8.00×51mmR French; 7.62×63mm (known as.30-06 Springfield); 7.92×57mm Mauser; 7.65×53mm Mauser	Detachable box magazine	France	1907
Ciężki karabin maszynowy wz. 25			7.92×57mm Mauser	Feed strip	Poland	1924
Ciężki karabin maszynowy wz. 30	Państwowa Fabryka Karabinów		7.92×57mm Mauser	Ammunition belt	Poland	1930
Colleoni machine gun		—	6.50×52mm Mannlicher–Carcano	Ammunition belt	Italy	1908
Colt Automatic Rifle	Colt Defense		5.56×45mm NATO	Detachable box magazine	United States	1982
Colt IAR6940	Colt's Manufacturing Company		5.56×45mm NATO	Detachable box magazine	United States	2008
Colt Machine Gun	Colt's Manufacturing Company		5.56×45mm NATO	Ammunition belt	United States	1965
Cugir machine gun	Cugir Arms Factory		7.62×54mmR	Ammunition belt	Romania	1966
ČZ 2000	Česká zbrojovka Uherský Brod		5.56×45mm NATO	Detachable box magazine Drum magazine	Czechoslovakia	1990
Daewoo Precision Industries K3	Daewoo Precision Industries		5.56×45mm NATO	Ammunition belt Detachable box magazine	South Korea	1991
Darne machine gun	Hotchkiss et Cie		7.5×54mm French; 8.00×51mmR French; 7.70×56mmR (known as .303 British); 7×57mm Mauser	Ammunition belt	France	1916
Degtyaryov machine gun	Degtyaryov Plant		7.62×54mmR	Pan magazine	Soviet Union	1927
Denel DMG-5	Denel Land Systems		7.62×51mm NATO	Ammunition belt	South Africa	2016
Dror light machine gun	Haganah; Israel Military Industries		7.70×56mmR (known as .303 British); 7.92×57mm Mauser	Detachable box magazine	Israel	1946
DS-39	Tula Arms Plant		7.62×54mmR	Ammunition belt	Soviet Union	1930
DShK	Tula Arms Plant		12.7×108mm	Ammunition belt	Soviet Union	1938
EMER-K1 LMG	Myanmar Fritz Werner Industries	—	5.56×45mm NATO	Detachable box magazine	Myanmar	1998
EPK (Pyrkal) Machine gun	Pyrkal		7.92×36mm EPK	Detachable box magazine	Greece	1939
Eriksen M/25	(Did not enter production)		6.5×55mm Swedish	Stripper clip box magazine	Norway	1925
EX-17 Heligun	Hughes Aircraft Company		7.62×51mm NATO		United States	1965-1970s
EYP Hotchkiss (Modified Hotchkiss machine gun)	EYP; Hotchkiss et Cie		7.92x57mm Mauser	Feed strip	Greece; France	1939
F-011 Levent	FLARM		5.56x45mm NATO; 7.62x51mm NATO	Ammunition belt	Ukraine	2019
FA Trapote m/33	Fabrica de Armas de Oviedo		7x57mm Mauser	Detachable box magazine	Spain	1933
Fiat–Revelli Modello 1914	FIAT		6.50×52mm Mannlicher–Carcano	Feed Strip box magazine	Italy	1913
Fiat–Revelli Modello 1935	Società Metallurgica Bresciana		8.00×59mm RB Breda	Ammunition belt	Italy	1934
Fittipaldi machine gun	(Did not enter production)		7.65×53mm Argentine	Ammunition belt	Argentina	1912
FM 24/29 light machine gun	Manufacture d'armes de Châtellerault		7.5×54mm French	Detachable box magazine	France	1923
FN BRG-15	FN Herstal		15.5×115mm	Ammunition belt	Belgium	1980s
FN EVOLYS	FN Herstal		5.56×45mm NATO; 7.62×51mm NATO	Ammunition belt	Belgium	2021
FN Minimi	FN Herstal		5.56×45mm NATO; 7.62×51mm NATO	Ammunition belt Detachable box magazine	Belgium	1974
FN MAG	FN Herstal		7.62×51mm NATO	Ammunition belt	Belgium	1950
FN SCAR HAMR	FN Herstal		5.56×45mm NATO; 6.8mm Remington SPC	Detachable box magazine	Belgium; United States	2008
Fokker-Leimberger	A.H.G. Fokker and Leimberger		7.92×57mm Mauser	Ammunition belt	Germany	1916
Frommer automatic rifle	Fegyver- és Gépgyár (FÉG)		7.92x57mm Mauser		Austria-Hungary	1908
Fusil ametrallador Oviedo	Fabrica de Armas de Oviedo		7.92x57mm Mauser; 7.62×51mm NATO	Detachable box magazine	Spain	1951
Fyodorov–Shpagin Model 1922			6.5×51mm Fyodorov	Detachable box magazine	Soviet Union	1922
Garanin general-purpose machine guns			7.62×54mmR	Ammunition belt	Soviet Union	1957
Gardner gun	Pratt & Whitney Measurement Systems		.45″ Cartridge Machine Gun Ball Mk III	Magazine; Hopper	United States	1874
Gast gun	Vorwerk SE & Co. KG		7.92×57mm Mauser	Drum magazine	Germany	1916
Gatling gun	Eagle Iron Works; Cooper Firearms Manufacturing Company; Colt's Manufacturing Company; American Ordnance Company		.45-70.30-40 Krag.30-03 Springfield; 7.62×63mm (known as.30-06 Springfield)	Hopper	United States	1862
GAU-19	General Dynamics		.50 BMG	Ammunition belt	United States	1983
G224; G762	Gestamen Arms		5.56x45mm 7.62x51mm	Ammunition belt	Hungary	2025
Gorgas machine gun		—			Confederate States	1860s
GShG-7.62 machine gun	KBP Instrument Design Bureau		7.62×54mmR		Soviet Union	1970
Heckler & Koch 421	Heckler & Koch	—	7.62×51mm NATO	Ammunition belt	Germany	2023
Heckler & Koch HK21	Heckler & Koch		7.62×51mm 5.56×45mm	Ammunition belt Detachable box magazine	West Germany	1961
Heckler & Koch MG36	Heckler & Koch		5.56×45mm	Drum magazine	Germany	1996
Heckler & Koch MG4	Heckler & Koch		5.56×45mm NATO	Ammunition belt	Germany	1990s
Heckler & Koch MG5	Heckler & Koch		7.62×51mm NATO	Ammunition belt	Germany	2010
Heckler & Koch XM8 light machine gun	Heckler & Koch		5.56×45mm NATO	Drum magazine	Germany; United States	2003
HMG PK-16	POF		12.7×108mm	Ammunition belt	Pakistan	2016
Ho-103			12.7×81mmSR	Ammunition belt	Japan	1941
Ho-204 cannon			37x144mm		Japan	1921's
Ho-301 cannon			40mm caseless		Japan	1940s
Ho-401 cannon			57x121R		Japan	1930s-1940s
Hotchkiss 13.2 mm machine gun	Hotchkiss et Cie		13.2×99mm Hotchkiss Long; 13.2×96mm Hotchkiss Short	Feed Strip; Detachable box magazine	France	1920s
Hotchkiss M1909 Benét–Mercié	Hotchkiss et Cie		7.62×63mm (known as.30-06 Springfield); 7.70×56mmR (known as .303 British); 8.00×51mmR French	Feed strip	France	1901
Hotchkiss M1922 machine gun	Hotchkiss et Cie		8.00×51mmR French; 7.5×54mm French; 6.5×54mm Mannlicher–Schönauer; 7×57mm Mauser; 7.70×56mmR (known as .303 British); 7.92×57mm Mauser	Feed Strip; Detachable box magazine	France	1922
Hotchkiss Mle 1914 machine gun	Hotchkiss et Cie		6.50×50mm Arisaka; 6.5×55mm Swedish; 7.00×57mm Mauser; 8.00×51mmR; 11 mm Gras	Ammunition belt Feed Strip	France	1914
HP 7.62	MSN	—	7.62×54mmR		Azerbaijan	2011
HR-13	Howa		5.56x45mm NATO	Detachable box magazine	Japan	1989
Hughes Lockless LMG	Hughes Aircraft			Detachable box magazine	United States	1980s
Huot Automatic Rifle	(Did not enter production)		7.70×56mmR (known as .303 British)	Drum magazine	Canada	1916
IWI Negev	Israel Weapon Industries		5.56×45mm 7.62×51mm	Ammunition belt Detachable box magazine	Israel	1985
INSAS LMG	Ordnance Factories Board		5.56×45mm NATO	Detachable box magazine	India	1998
Johnston light machine gun			7.62×63mm (known as.30-06 Springfield)	Drum magazine	United States	1918's
Karabin lotniczy wz. 36			7.92×57mm_Mauser	Ammunition belt	Poland	1930s
Karabin lotniczy wz. 37	Państwowa Fabryka Karabinów		7.92×57mm Mauser	Pan magazine	Poland	1937
Kbkm wz. 2003			5.56×45mm NATO	Ammunition belt Detachable box magazine	Poland	2003
KB-P-790	KBP Instrument Design Bureau		7.62×39mm	Ammunition belt	Soviet Union	
Kjellman machine gun	Swedish Army		6.5×55mm Swedish	Hopper/Belt; Magazine	Sweden	1870
Kk 62	Valmet		7.62×39mm	Ammunition belt	Finland	1950s
KMG556CL	Kalekalip		5.56×45mm	Ammunition belt Detachable box magazine	Turkey	2020s
Knight's Armament Company LAMG	Knight's Armament Company	—	5.56×45mm 7.62×51mm 6.5mm Creedmoor	Ammunition belt	United States	1986
Knötgen automatic rifle			7.92×57mm Mauser	Detachable box magazine	Germany	1910
Komodo Armament Eli gun	Komodo Armament		7.62×51mm NATO	Ammunition belt	Indonesia; Italy	2014
Kord machine gun	Degtyaryov Plant		12.7×108mm	Ammunition belt	Russia	1990s
KPV heavy machine gun	Degtyaryov Plant		14.5×114mm	Ammunition belt	Soviet Union	1944
Ksp 58	FN Herstal; Carl Gustafs stads gevärsfaktori		6.5×55mm Swedish; 7.62×51mm NATO	Ammunition belt	Belgium; Sweden	1958
Kulspruta m/39	Carl Gustafs Stads Gevärsfaktori		6.5×55mm Swedish; 7.62×51mm NATO; 8×63mm patron m/32	Ammunition belt	Sweden	1939
Kulspruta m/42	Carl Gustafs Stads Gevärsfaktori		6.5×55mm Swedish; 7.62×51mm NATO; 8×63mm patron m/32	Ammunition belt	Sweden	1942
Kulsprutegevär m/40	Svenska Automatvapen AB		6.5×55mm Swedish; 7.92×57mm Mauser	Detachable box magazine	Sweden	1940
L86 LSW	Royal Small Arms Factory		5.56×45mm NATO	Detachable box magazine	United Kingdom	1970s
L94A1 chain gun	Heckler & Koch		7.62×51mm NATO	Ammunition belt	United Kingdom	1980
LAD machine gun	Central Research Complex for Small Arms and Mortars		7.62×25mm Tokarev	Ammunition belt	Soviet Union	1942
Lahti-Saloranta M/26	Valtion kivääritehdas		7.62×53mmR	Detachable box magazine	Finland	1925
Lewis gun	Birmingham Small Arms Company		7.62×63mm (known as.30-06 Springfield); 7.70×56mmR (known as .303 British); 7.92×57mm Mauser	Pan magazine	United States; United Kingdom	1914
Lmg 25	W+F Bern		7.5×55mm Swiss	Detachable box magazine	Switzerland	1925
LSAT light machine gun	AAI Corporation		5.56×45mm NATO	Ammunition belt	United States	2003
M2 Browning	General Dynamics		12.7×99mm NATO	Ammunition belt	United States	1933
M2 Stinger	G Company, 28th Marine Regiment, 5th Marine Division		7.62×63mm (known as .30-06 Springfield)	Ammunition belt	United States	1943
M27 IAR	Heckler & Koch		5.56×45mm NATO	Detachable box magazine	Germany; United States	2008
M45 quad mount	W. L. Maxson Corporation		.50 BMG	Ammunition belt	United States	1944
M60	Saco Defense; U.S. Ordnance		7.62×51mm NATO	Ammunition belt	United States	1957
M73	General Electric		7.62×51mm NATO	Ammunition belt	United States	1959
M85	General Electric		12.7×99mm NATO	Ammunition belt	United States	1959
M134 Minigun	General Electric		7.62×51mm NATO	Ammunition belt	United States	1960
M240 Medium Machine Gun	Fabrique Nationale d'Herstal		7.62×51mm NATO	Ammunition belt	Belgium; United States	1950s
M242 Bushmaster	Hughes Helicopters		25×137mm	Ammunition belt	United States	1981
M249 Machine Gun	Fabrique Nationale d'Herstal		5.56×45mm NATO	Ammunition belt Detachable box magazine	Belgium; United States	1976
M250/SIG LMG	SIG Sauer		6.80×51mm Common Cartridge (known as .277 Fury) 7.62×51mm NATO 6.5 Creedmoor	Ammunition belt	United States	2022
M1895 Colt–Browning	Colt's Manufacturing Company; Marlin Firearms		6.00mm Lee Navy; 6.50×52mm Mannlicher–Carcano; 7×57mm Mauser; 7.62×54mmR; 7.62×63mm (known as.30-06 Springfield); 7.70×56mmR (known as .303 British); 7.82×58.8mm (known as.30-40 Krag)	Ammunition belt	United States	1889
M1917 Browning			7.62×63mm (known as .30-06 Springfield)	Ammunition belt	United States	1917
M1918 Browning	Winchester Repeating Arms Company		6.50×55mm 7.62×63mm (known as.30-06 Springfield); 7.92×57mm Mauser	Detachable box magazine	United States	1917
M1919 Browning	Buffalo Arms Corporation; Rock Island Arsenal; Saginaw Steering Company		6.50×55mm 7.5×54mm French; 7.62×51mm 7.62×54mmR; 7.62×63mm (known as.30-06 Springfield); 7.65×53mm Argentine; 7.70×56mmR (known as .303 British); 7.92×57mm Mauser; 8×63mm patron m/32	Ammunition belt	United States	1919
M1921 Browning			12.7×99mm NATO	Ammunition belt	United States	1929
M1941 Johnson	Melvin Johnson		7.62×63mm (known as .30-06 Springfield)	Detachable box magazine	United States	1940
MA-2	Myanmar Directorate of Defence Industries; Myanmar Fritz Werner Industries		5.56×45mm NATO	Drum magazine	Myanmar	2002
MA-2 Mk. III	Myanmar Directorate of Defence Industries		5.56×45mm NATO	Detachable box magazine	Myanmar	2012
MAC-58	Manufacture d'armes de Saint-Étienne		.50 BMG	Ammunition belt	France	1958
MAC 1934	Manufacture d'armes de Châtellerault	—	7.5×54mm French	Ammunition belt Drum magazine	France	1934
Madsen machine gun	Compagnie Madsen		6.5×55mm Swedish; 7×57mm Mauser; 7.62×51mm 7.62×54mmR; 7.65×53mm Argentine; 7.70×56mmR (known as .303 British); 7.92×57mm Mauser	Detachable box magazine	Denmark	1896
Madsen-Saetter machine gun	DISA		7.62×51mm 7.62×63mm (known as .30-06 Springfield).50 BMG	Ammunition belt	Denmark	1952
MAG-58	Manufacture d'armes de Saint-Étienne	FN MAG	7.62x51mm NATO	Ammunition belt	France	1958
Mark 38 25 mm machine gun system	Naval Surface Warfare Center Crane Division; BAE Systems		25×137mm		United States	1986
Mark 48 machine gun	FN Herstal		7.62×51mm NATO	Ammunition belt	United States	2003
Maxim gun	Maxim Gun Company, Vickers		7.70×56mmR (known as .303 British)	Ammunition belt	United Kingdom	1883
Maxim M/09-21			7.62×54mmR	Ammunition belt	Finland	1921
Maxim M/32-33			7.62×53mmR	Ammunition belt	Finland	1931
Maxim-Tokarev	Tula Arms Plant		7.62×54mmR	Ammunition belt	Soviet Union	1923
McClean-Lissak	McClean Arms and Ordnance Company		.30-06 Springfield	Detachable box magazine	United States	1919
McCrudden light machine rifle	(Did not enter production)		7.70×56mmR (known as .303 British)	Detachable box magazine	Australia	1919
Mendoza C-1934	Productos Mendoza		7×57mm Mauser	Detachable box magazine	Mexico	1928
Mendoza RM2	Productos Mendoza		7.62×63mm (known as .30-06 Springfield)	Detachable box magazine	Mexico	1928
MG 01	Deutsche Waffen und Munitionsfabriken		Patrone 88		Germany	1901
MG 3	Rheinmetall		7.62×51mm NATO	Ammunition belt	West Germany	1959
MG 08	Deutsche Waffen und Munitionsfabriken		7.92×57mm Mauser	Ammunition belt	Germany	1908
MG 11	Waffenfabrik Bern		7.5×55mm Swiss	Ammunition belt	Switzerland	1911
MG 13	Simson		7.92×57mm Mauser	Detachable box magazine	Germany	1928
MG 15	Bergmann; Rheinmetall		7.92×57mm Mauser	Drum magazine	Germany	1920s
MG 17 machine gun	Rheinmetall		7.92×57mm Mauser	Ammunition belt	Germany	1934
MG 29	Waffenfabrik Bern		7.5×55mm Swiss	Ammunition belt	Switzerland	1920s
MG 30	Steyr-Daimler-Puch		7×57mm Mauser; 7.92×57mm Mauser; 8×56mmR	Detachable box magazine	Austria; Switzerland	1930s
MG 34	Mauser; Steyr-Daimler-Puch; Waffenwerke Brünn		7.92×57mm Mauser	Ammunition belt	Germany	1934
MG 39 Rh	Rheinmetall		7.92×57mm Mauser	Ammunition belt	Germany	1937
MG 42	Mauser; Wilhelm-Gustloff-Stiftung; Steyr-Daimler-Puch; Metall-und Lackierwarenfabrik Johannes Großfuß; MAGET		7.92×57mm Mauser	Ammunition belt	Germany	1942
MG 45	Mauser		7.92×57mm Mauser	Ammunition belt	Germany	1944
MG 51	Waffenfabrik Bern		7.5×55mm Swiss; 7.62×51mm	Ammunition belt	Switzerland	1951
MG 69	John P. Foote		5.56x45mm NATO	Ammunition belt	United States	1969
MG 81	Mauser		7.92×57mm Mauser	Ammunition belt	Germany	1939
MG 131	Rheinmetall		13×64mmB	Ammunition belt	Germany	1938
M+G project	Artillerie-Inrichtingen		7.62x51mm 5.56x45mm	Detachable box magazine Ammunition belt	Netherlands	1962
Mitrailleuse	Meudon and Nantes government facilities		13 mm (.51 calibre); 11 mm	Magazine	France	1866
Mitrailleuse d'Avion Browning - F.N. Calibre 13,2 mm	FN Herstal; Ericsson		13.2×99mm Hotchkiss Long.50 BMG	Ammunition belt	Belgium	1939
Montigny mitrailleuse	Belgian Armory		11 mm	Magazine	Belgium	1863
Model 45A	United States Army		7.62×63mm (known as .30-06 Springfield)	Detachable box magazine	United States; Commonwealth of the Philippines	1945
Model 1924/1929D machine gun			7.5×54mm French	Detachable box magazine	France	1924's
Moharram			12.7×108mm	Ammunition belt	Iran	2014
Nambu-type training light machine gun	Nambu Arms Manufacturing Company		6.5mm blanks	Detachable box magazine	Japan	1920s
Nikonov machine gun	Izhmash		5.45×39mm	Detachable box magazine	Soviet Union	1977
Nkm wz. 38 FK	Państwowa Fabryka Karabinów		20×138mmB	Detachable box magazine Drum magazine Ammunition belt	Second Polish Republic	1938
NSV machine gun	Metallist; Uralsk; Kazakh SSR		12.7×108mm	Ammunition belt	Soviet Union	1971
Odkolek M1899	Adolf Odkolek von Újezd		Patrone 88	Ammunition belt	Austria-Hungary	1899
REAPR	Ohio Ordnance Works		8.60×63mm (known as .338 Norma Magnum); 7.62×51mm	Ammunition belt	United States	2024
Parabellum MG 14	Karl Heinemann		7.92×57mm Mauser	Ammunition belt	Germany	1913
Perino Model 1908			6.50×52mm Mannlicher–Carcano	Feed Strip	Italy	1901
Pindad SM-2	PT Pindad		7.62×51mm NATO	Ammunition belt	Indonesia	2003
Pindad SM-3	PT Pindad		5.56×45mm NATO	Ammunition belt Detachable box magazine	Indonesia	2003
Pindad SM-5	PT Pindad		12.7×108mm	Ammunition belt	Indonesia	2003
Pindad SM-5 A1	PT Pindad		12.7×108mm	Ammunition belt	Indonesia	2000s
PK	Degtyaryov Plant		7.62×54mmR	Ammunition belt	Soviet Union	1961
PKP Pecheneg	TsNIITochMash; Degtyaryov Plant		7.62×54mmR	Ammunition belt	Russia	2001
PM M1910			7.62×54mmR	Ammunition belt	Russia	1909
PMT-76	Mechanical and Chemical Industry Corporation		7.62×51mm NATO	Ammunition belt	Turkey	2019
PU-21	TsNIITochMash		5.45×39mm	Ammunition belt Detachable box magazine	Soviet Union	1971
Puckle gun	James Puckle			Cylinder	United Kingdom	1718
Puteaux APX Machine Gun			8.00mm Lebel	Feed Strip	France	1905
PV-1 machine gun	Tula Arms Factory		7.62×54mmR	Ammunition belt	Soviet Union	1927
PZD 556	DSS		5.56×45mm NATO	Ammunition belt	Czech Republic	2024
PZD 762	DSS		7.62×51mm NATO	Ammunition belt	Czech Republic	2024
PZD Mk24	DSS		5.56×45mm NATO	Ammunition belt	Czech Republic	2024
QJB-95	Norinco		5.56×45mm NATO; 5.80×42mm DBP87	Detachable box magazine Drum magazine	China	1997
QJG-02	Norinco		14.5×114mm	Ammunition belt	China	2002
QJS-161	Norinco		5.8×42mm DBP-191	Ammunition belt Detachable box magazine Drum magazine	China	
QJY-88	Norinco		5.80×42mm	Ammunition belt	China	1980s
QJY-201	Norinco		7.62×51mm DJP-201	Ammunition belt	China	2010s
QJZ-89	Norinco		12.7×108mm	Ammunition belt	China	1980s
QJZ-171	Norinco		12.7×108mm light-weight ammunition	Ammunition belt	China	
Reibel machine gun	Manufacture d'armes de Châtellerault		7.5×54mm French; 7.5x55mm Swiss	Pan magazine	France	1931
Rheinmetall MG 60	Rheinmetall		7.62×51mm NATO	Ammunition belt	West Germany	1960
Rheinmetall RMG.50	Rheinmetall		.50 BMG	Ammunition belt	Germany	2008
Rheinmetall RMG 7.62	Rheinmetall		7.62×51mm	Ammunition belt	Germany	2013
Rieder automatic rifle			7.70×56mmR (known as .303 British)	Detachable box magazine	South Africa	1940
Ripley machine gun					United States	1861
Rkm wz. 28	Państwowa Fabryka Karabinów		7.92×57mm Mauser	Detachable box magazine	Poland	1928
RM834	True Velocity		7.62x51mm NATO; 6.5 Creedmoor; 6.8TVC; M1186 6.8mm round	Ammunition belt	United States	2025
Rodman Laboratories XM235	Rodman Laboratories		6x45mm SAW	Ammunition belt	United States	1970s
Rolls-Royce Experimental Machine Gun	Rolls-Royce		.50 BMG.55 Boys	Ammunition belt	United Kingdom	1940
Rossignol ENT	ENT		6x60mm		France	1900
RPD			7.62×39mm	Ammunition belt	Soviet Union	1944
RPK	Molot plant		7.62×39mm M43	Detachable box magazine Drum magazine	Soviet Union	1961
RPK-74	Molot plant	Soviet_RPK-74	5.45×39mm M74	Detachable box magazine	Soviet Union	1974
RPK-16	Kalashnikov Concern		5.45x39mm M74	Detachable box magazine Drum magazine	Russia	2016
RPL-20	Kalashnikov Concern		5.45x39mm M74	Ammunition belt	Russia	2020
Ruger machine gun	Bill Ruger		7.62×63mm (known as .30-06 Springfield)	Ammunition belt	United States	1941
S&T Motiv K16	SNT Motiv		7.62×51mm NATO	Ammunition belt Detachable box magazine	South Korea	2021
SNT Motiv K15	SNT Motiv		5.56×45mm NATO	Ammunition belt Detachable box magazine	South Korea	2021
SAFAT M1926	SAFAT		7.70×56mmR (known as .303 British)	Ammunition belt	Italy	1926
Salvator-Dormus M1893	Škoda Works		8.00×50mmR Mannlicher	Detachable box magazine	Austria-Hungary	1893
Savin–Norov machine gun			7.62×54mmR	Ammunition belt	Soviet Union	1935
Schwarzlose machine gun	Škoda Works		7.92×57mm Mauser; 8.00×50mmR Mannlicher	Ammunition belt	Austria-Hungary	1905
Schirokauer machine gun	Schirgun corporation		7.62×63mm (known as .30-06 Springfield)	Ammunition belt	United States	1941
SG-43 Goryunov			7.62×54mmR	Ammunition belt	Soviet Union	1940
ShKAS machine gun			7.62×54mmR	Ammunition belt	Soviet Union	1933
SIG KE7	Schweizerische Industrie Gesellschaft		7×57mm Mauser; 7.65×53mm Mauser; 7.92×57mm Mauser	Detachable box magazine	Switzerland	1929
SIG MG 50	Schweizerische Industrie Gesellschaft		7×57mm Mauser; 7.65×53mm Mauser; 7.92×57mm Mauser	Ammunition belt	Switzerland	1951
SIG MG 710-3	Schweizerische Industrie Gesellschaft		7.62×51mm NATO	Ammunition belt	Switzerland	1955
SIG Sauer MMG 338	SIG Sauer		8.60×63mm (known as .338 Norma Magnum); 7.62x51mm NATO; 6.8X51	Ammunition belt	United States	2018
Sosinskiy 1906	B. E. Sosinskiy		7.62x54mmR	Ammunition belt	Russia	1903
Sterling 7.62	Sterling Armaments Company		7.62×51mm NATO	Detachable box magazine	United Kingdom	1950s
St. Étienne Mle 1907	Manufacture d'armes de Saint-Étienne		8.00×51mmR French	Ammunition belt Feed Strip (Later version)	France	1908
STK 50MG	ST Kinetics		12.7×99mm NATO	Ammunition belt	Singapore	1991
Stoner 63/63A Light Machine Gun	Cadillac Gage		5.56×45mm NATO	Ammunition belt Detachable box magazine	United States	1962
Sumitomo Minimi	Sumitomo Heavy Industries		5.56×45mm NATO	Ammunition belt Detachable box magazine	Japan	1975
Sumitomo Type 62	Sumitomo Heavy Industries		7.62×51mm NATO	Ammunition belt	Japan	1954
SureFire MGX	SureFire LLC		5.56×45mm NATO; 6.8mm Remington SPC	Detachable box magazine	United States	2002
T23E1 machine gun T23E2 machine gun	Springfield Armory		7.62×63mm (known as .30-06 Springfield)	Ammunition belt	United States	1943-1944
T24 machine gun	Saginaw Steering Gear		7.62×63mm (known as .30-06 Springfield)	Ammunition belt	United States	1944
T75 light machine gun	205th Armory		5.56×45mm NATO	Ammunition belt Detachable box magazine	Taiwan	1987
TADEN gun	Royal Small Arms Factory		7.00mm Mk 1 Z	Ammunition belt	United Kingdom	1951
Tank machine gun type 95/98	Prototypa, a.s.		7.62×51mm 7.62x54mmR		Czech Republic	
TKB-264-42			7.62x54mmR	Ammunition belt	Soviet Union	1942
True Velocity RM338	General Dynamics		.338 Norma Magnum.338 Lapua Magnum	Ammunition belt	United States	2014
Type 1 heavy machine gun			7.70×58mm Arisaka	Feed Strip	Japan	1941
Type 2 machine gun			13×64mmB	Ammunition belt	Japan	1942
Type 3 aircraft machine gun	Nihon Seikōjō KK; Suzuka Naval Arsenal; Toyokawa Naval Arsenal		13.2×99mm Hotchkiss Long	Ammunition belt	Japan	1943
Type 3 heavy machine gun	Koishikawa Arsenal		6.50×50mm Arisaka	Feed Strip	Japan	1914
Type 11 light machine gun			6.50×50mm Arisaka	Hopper	Japan	1922
Type 67 machine gun	Norinco		7.62×54mmR	Ammunition belt	China	1959
Type 73 light machine gun	First Machine Industry Bureau		7.62×54mmR	Ammunition belt Detachable box magazine	North Korea	1973
Type 77 heavy machine gun	Norinco		12.7×108mm	Ammunition belt	China	1977
Type 80 machine gun	Norinco		7.62×54mmR	Ammunition belt	China	1980
Type 81 squad machine gun			7.62×39mm	Detachable box magazine Drum magazine	China	1971
Type 89 fixed aircraft machine gun			7.70x58mmSR Type 89	Ammunition belt	Japan	1929
Type 89 machine gun flexible type			7.70x58mmSR Type 89	Pan magazine	Japan	1929
Type 90 machine gun	205th Armory		.50 BMG	Ammunition belt	Taiwan	2001
Type 92 heavy machine gun	Hino Motors; Hitachi		7.70×58mm Arisaka	Feed Strip	Japan	1932
Type 92 machine gun	Toyokawa Naval Arsenal; Yokosuka Naval Arsenal		7.70x56mmR Type 87	Pan magazine	Japan	1932
Type 93 heavy machine gun	Yokosuka Naval Yard		13.2×99mm Hotchkiss	box/ffff	Japan	1933
Type 96 light machine gun	Kokura Arsenal; Nagoya Arsenal; Mukden		6.50×50mm Arisaka	Detachable box magazine	Japan	1936
Type 97 aircraft machine gun	KK Nihon Seikoujo; Suzuka Naval Arsenal; Toyokawa Naval Arsenal		7.70x56mmR Type 87	Ammunition belt	Japan	1937
Type 97 heavy tank machine gun			7.70×58mm Arisaka	Detachable box magazine	Japan	1937
Type 98/Type 1 machine gun	Nagoya Arsenal; Tagajo Naval Arsenal; Yokosuka Naval Arsenal		7.92×57mm Mauser	Drum magazine	Japan	1938/1941
Type 99 light machine gun	Kokura Arsenal; Nagoya Arsenal		7.70×58mm Arisaka	Detachable box magazine	Japan	1939
Type 100 machine gun			7.92×57mm Mauser	Drum magazine	Japan	1940
UKM-2000	Zakłady Mechaniczne Tarnów		7.62×51mm NATO	Ammunition belt	Poland	2000
Ultimax 100	ST Kinetics		5.56×45mm NATO	Detachable box magazine Drum magazine	Singapore	1977
Uk vz. 59	Zbrojovka Vsetín		7.62×51mm NATO; 7.62×54mmR	Ammunition belt	Czechoslovakia	1956
UP 7.62	MSN	—	7.62×54mmR		Azerbaijan	2011
Vektor SS-77 Mini-SS	Denel Land Systems		7.62×51mm 5.56×45mm	Ammunition belt	South Africa	1977
Vickers .50 machine gun	Vickers-Armstrongs		12.7×81mm	Ammunition belt	United Kingdom	1932
Vickers-Berthier	Vickers-Armstrong; Rifle Factory Ishapore		7.70×56mmR (known as .303 British); 7.65×53mm Mauser	Detachable box magazine	United Kingdom	1932
Vickers machine gun	Vickers Limited		7.70×56mmR (known as .303 British)	Ammunition belt	United Kingdom	1912
Vickers K machine gun	Vickers-Armstrong		7.70×56mmR (known as .303 British)	Pan magazine	United Kingdom	1935
VMG 1927			7.92×57mm Mauser	Drum magazine	Germany	1927
Vollmer M35			7.75×40.5 mm 7.75×39.5mm 7.9mm	Detachable box magazine	Germany	1930s
Vz. 52 machine gun	Zbrojovka Brno		7.62×45mm 7.62×39mm	Ammunition belt Detachable box magazine	Czechoslovakia	1950s
W85 heavy machine gun	Norinco		12.7×108mm	Ammunition belt	China	1980
Weibel M/1932	Dansk Industri Syndikat		7.00×44mm Danrif	Detachable box magazine	Denmark	1932
XM133 Minigun	General Electric; Garwood Industries; Dillon Aero; DeGroat Tactical Armaments; McNally Industries LLC		7.62×51mm NATO	Ammunition belt	United States	1969
XM214 Microgun	General Electric; General Dynamics		5.56×45mm M193	Ammunition belt	United States	1970s
XM312 (Cancelled project)	Project Manager Soldier Weapons; General Dynamics		12.7×99mm NATO	Ammunition belt	United States	2000
XM806 (Cancelled project)	General Dynamics		12.7×99mm NATO	Ammunition belt	United States	2009
XR-17	Dasan Machineries Co., Ltd		5.56×45mm NATO; 7.62×51mm NATO	Ammunition belt	South Korea	2023
YakB-12.7 machine gun	KBP Instrument Design Bureau		12.7×108mm		Soviet Union	1973
Zastava M02 Coyote	Zastava Arms		12.7×108mm	Ammunition belt	Serbia and Montenegro	2002
Zastava M72	Zastava Arms		7.62×39mm	Detachable box magazine	Yugoslavia	1972
Zastava M77	Zastava Arms		7.62×51mm NATO	Detachable box magazine	Yugoslavia	1977
Zastava M84	Zastava Arms		7.62×54mmR	Ammunition belt	Yugoslavia	1984
Zastava M87	Zastava Arms		12.7×108mm	Ammunition belt	Yugoslavia	1987
ZB-50	Zbrojovka Brno		7.92×57mm Mauser	Ammunition belt	Czechoslovakia	1932
ZB-53	Zbrojovka Brno		7.92×57mm Mauser	Ammunition belt	Czechoslovakia	1930
ZB-60	Zbrojovka Brno		15×104mm Brno	Ammunition belt	Czechoslovakia	1935
ZB vz. 26	Zbrojovka Brno		7.92×57mm Mauser	Detachable box magazine	Czechoslovakia	1923
ZB vz. 30	Zbrojovka Brno		7.92×57mm Mauser	Detachable box magazine	Czechoslovakia	1930
Zf.Ger.38			7.92×57mm wooden bullet blanks		Germany	1938

== See also ==
- List of assault rifles
- List of battle rifles
- List of bolt-action rifles
- List of carbines
- List of firearms
- List of multiple-barrel firearms
- List of pistols
- List of pump-action rifles
- List of revolvers
- List of semi-automatic pistols
- List of shotguns
- List of sniper rifles
- List of straight-pull rifles
- List of weapons
