= Type 3 aircraft machine gun =

Type 3 machine gun
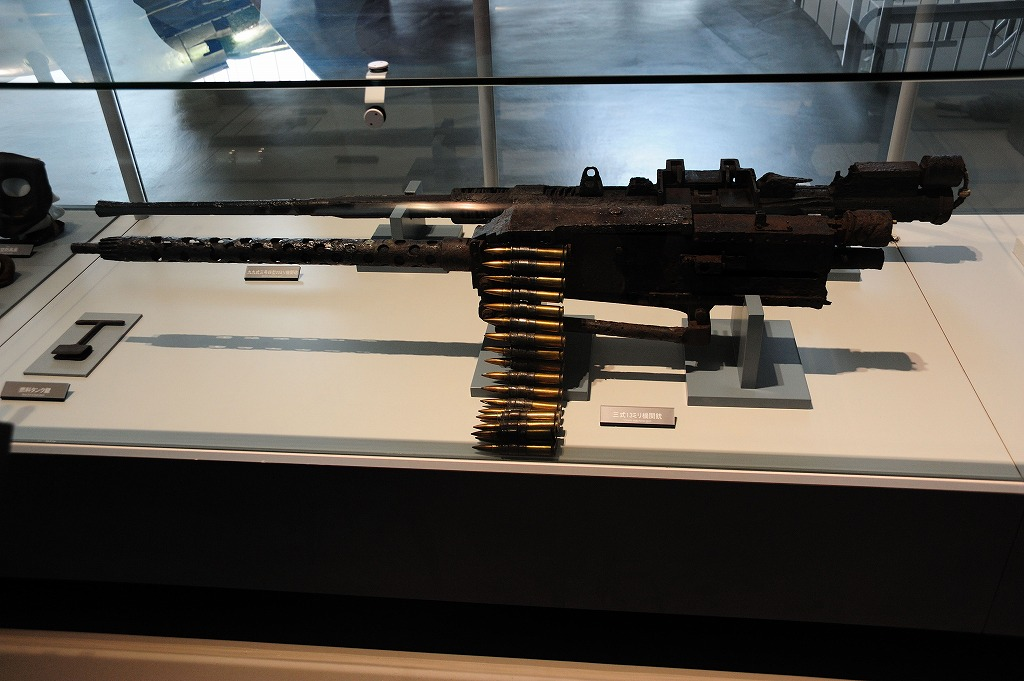
- Type 3 aircraft machine gun
- Type: Heavy machine gun
- Place of origin: Empire of Japan

Service history
- In service: 1943–1945
- Used by: Imperial Japanese Navy
- Wars: World War II

Production history
- Manufacturer: Nihon Seikōjō KK; Suzuka Naval Arsenal; Toyokawa Naval Arsenal

Specifications
- Mass: 27.5 kilograms (60.6 lb)
- Length: 1,530 mm (60 in)
- Barrel length: 910 mm (36 in)
- Cartridge: 13.2×99mm Hotchkiss (52 g)
- Action: Short recoil-operated, rising block locked (Browning)
- Rate of fire: 800 RPM
- Muzzle velocity: 790 m/s (2,600 ft/s)
- Feed system: Disintegrating Belt
- Sights: Iron

The Type 3 13 mm fixed aircraft machine gun (Japanese: 三式十三粍固定機銃, romanized: San shiki jyū-san mirimētoru kōtei kijū) was a Japanese Navy aircraft machine gun used during World War II. It was based on the American M2 Browning machine gun but used the 13.2x99mm Hotchkiss cartridge.

== History ==
The Type 3 was derived from the .50 in (12.7 mm) M2 Browning but chambered for the slightly larger 13.2×99mm Hotchkiss round, the same cartridge as the Hotchkiss M1929 machine gun and the Imperial Japanese military's licensed version, the Type 93 heavy machine gun. Despite the small difference in calibers, it was possible to use M2 Browning cartridges in the Japanese machine gun, which ostensibly occurred during World War II. The machine gun was produced from 1943 to 1945.

The fixed version was used on later models of the Mitsubishi A6M Zero fighter and prototypes of the Kawanishi N1K Shiden Kai.

The Type 3 was trialled for flexible defensive fixtures as well as fixed offensive ones. The flexible version featured a longer barrel. It was ultimately determined to be unsuitable in a flexible defensive role due to its weight compared to existing alternatives; the 13.2mm Type 3 weighed almost 28 kg (62 lb), heavier than the 20mm Type 99-1 Mod.1 autocannon at 23 kg (51 lb). The flexible version was ultimately rejected in favour of the lighter Type 2 machine gun.

== See also ==
- List of Japanese military equipment of World War II
- 13 mm caliber
- List of machine guns

== Literature ==
- René J. Francillon: Japanese Aircraft of the Pacific War. Londyn: Putnam, 1979. ISBN 0-370-30251-6.
- Robert C. Mikesh: Japanese Aircraft Equipment 1940-1945. Atglen, PA: Schiffer Publishing, 2004. ISBN 0-7643-2097-1.
- Anthony G. Williams: Rapid Fire: The Development of Automatic Cannon and Heavy Machine Guns for Armies, Navies, and Air Forces. Airlife Publishing, Ltd, 2000. ISBN 978-1840371222.
