= Type 3 machine gun =

Type 3 machine gun may refer to:

- Type 3 heavy machine gun, also known as the Taishō 14 machine gun, a Japanese 6.5-millimeter air-cooled heavy machine gun in service from 1914 to 1945
- Type 3 aircraft machine gun, an Imperial Japanese Navy 13.2-millimeter aircraft machine gun used during World War II
