= USS LST-504 =

1943 LST-491-class tank landing ship

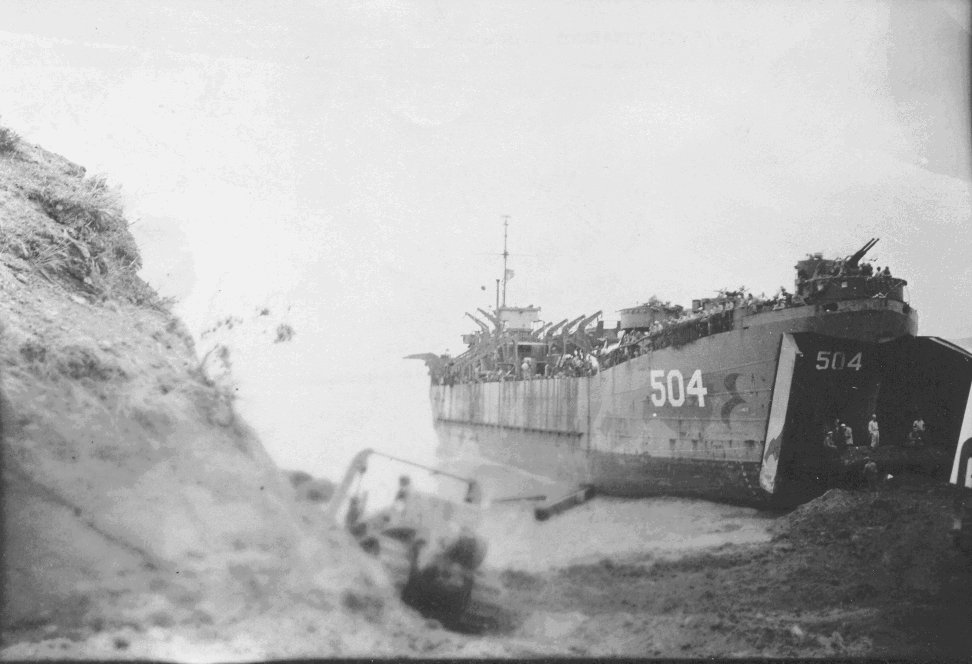
- LST-504 beached at Chim Wan, Okinawa 8 June 1945 while being unloaded by Navy Seabees.

History

United States
- Name: USS Buchanan County
- Namesake: Buchanan County, Iowa; Buchanan County, Missouri; Buchanan County, Virginia
- Laid down: 21 July 1943
- Launched: 19 October 1943
- Commissioned: 18 December 1943
- Decommissioned: 22 January 1946
- Stricken: 11 August 1955
- Fate: Sunk as a target

General characteristics
- Class & type: LST-491-class tank landing ship
- Displacement: 1,625 tons (light), 4,080 tons (full)
- Length: 328 ft
- Beam: 50 ft
- Draft: Bow 2'-4", stern 7'-6" (unloaded); bow 8'-2", stern 14'-1" (unloaded)
- Depth: 8' fwd; 14'-4" aft (full load)
- Propulsion: Two General Motors 12-567 diesel engines, two shafts, twin rudders
- Speed: 12 knots
- Boats & landing craft carried: Two or six LCVPs
- Troops: 14–16 officers, 131–147 enlisted men
- Complement: 7–9 officers, 104–120 enlisted men
- Armament: Two twin 40 mm gun mounts w/Mk. 51 directors, four single 40 mm gun mounts, twelve single 20 mm gun mounts

USS LST-504 was an LST-491-class tank landing ship built for the United States Navy during World War II. Renamed USS Buchanan County (LST-504) for counties in Iowa, Missouri, and Virginia on 1 July 1955, she was the only U.S. Naval vessel to bear the name.

LST-504 was laid down on 21 July 1943 at Jeffersonville, Indiana by the Jeffersonville Boat & Machine Company; launched on 19 October 1943; sponsored by Mrs. W. J. Griffin; and commissioned on 18 December 1943. During World War II, LST-504 was assigned to the European Theater and participated in the Invasion of Normandy.

== D-Day ==
As part of Operation Overlord, LST-504 departed Weymouth, England, on 4 June 1944. However, she turned back due to bad weather and would later re-embark on the night of 5 June. LST-504 reached Omaha beach the next morning, and dropped anchor about a half mile off shore to avoid floating mines. In subsequent round trips made over the course of 30 days, the ship did land directly on the beach. On one such trip, the ship carried members of the 38th Cavalry Reconnaissance Squadron (Mechanized).

== Later Service ==
Following her service in Operation Overlord, LST-504 was directed towards Sicily to prepare for the invasion of Southern France. En Route, the convoy that LST-504 now led spotted a German ship. Orders were given for the convoy to turn, however one ship misinterpreted the order and turned the wrong way. A collision with that ship damaged the bow door of LST-504. The 504 was diverted to Bizerte, Tunisia for repairs. Once the repairs were completed, the 504 embarked for her original destination of Italy. For the months of August and September, 1944, LST-504 carried troops between Italy and Southern France. She was then assigned to the Asiatic-Pacific Theater and took part in the assault and occupation of Okinawa Gunto in April and June, 1945. Following the War, LST-504 performed occupation duty in the Far East until mid-January, 1946.She was decommissioned on 15 January 1946 in Tokyo Bay. The decommissioning ceremony took place on the main deck of the 504 at 5 minutes after 4 o'clock (1605 hours). At that time 19 officers and 30 enlisted men of the Japanese navy came aboard and the 504 was given to the Japanese. .

LST-504 earned three battle stars for World War II service.

== See also ==
- List of United States Navy LSTs
