= Johnston light machine gun =

Johnston D1918 LMG
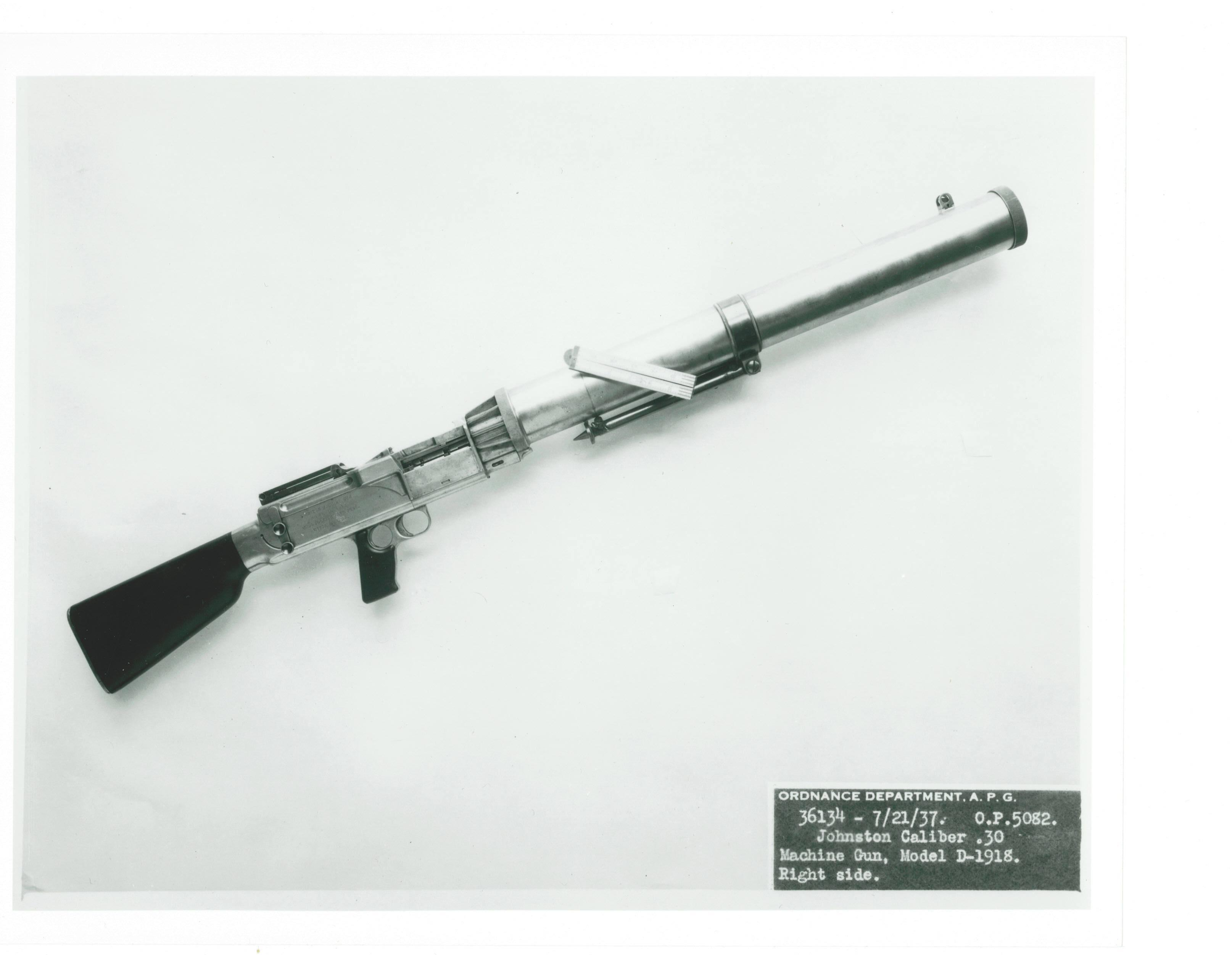
- Type: Light machine gun
- Place of origin: United States

Specifications
- Cartridge: .30-06 Springfield
- Action: gas-operated
- Feed system: double drum magazine

The Johnston Model D1918 was a light machine gun. It is a rare and little-known weapon with scant information available on it. It is best known for its resemblance to the Lewis Gun, having a similar gas-operated action and a barrel surrounded by a cooling shroud.

The weapon was chambered for the .30-06 round, fed from double drum magazines. (Note: Rather than the Lewis pan magazine.)

The action was gas-operated, with the piston working in a cylinder beneath and integral with the barrel. The Johnston did not use the Lewis's prominent clock spring. Cocking of the piece was unusual, the entire pistol grip sliding forwards to engage the action, then returning backwards to cock it. (Note: A similar cocking action was used in the Czech BESA 15mm and was copied for later models of the Besal emergency production LMG based on the Bren) This was first unlocked by a trigger-like mechanism in a cutout through the grip, behind the firing trigger.

The cooling shroud could be removed without tools by unscrewing the front retaining ring from the barrel by hand. The aluminium cooling fins inside were in two pieces and once the shroud was removed, came loose from the barrel. A cold barrel could be unscrewed for field exchange. (Note: Unlike the Bren, where a side handle with extra insulation and leverage was provided to allow a hot barrel to be changed.) An integral bipod was attached to the shroud.

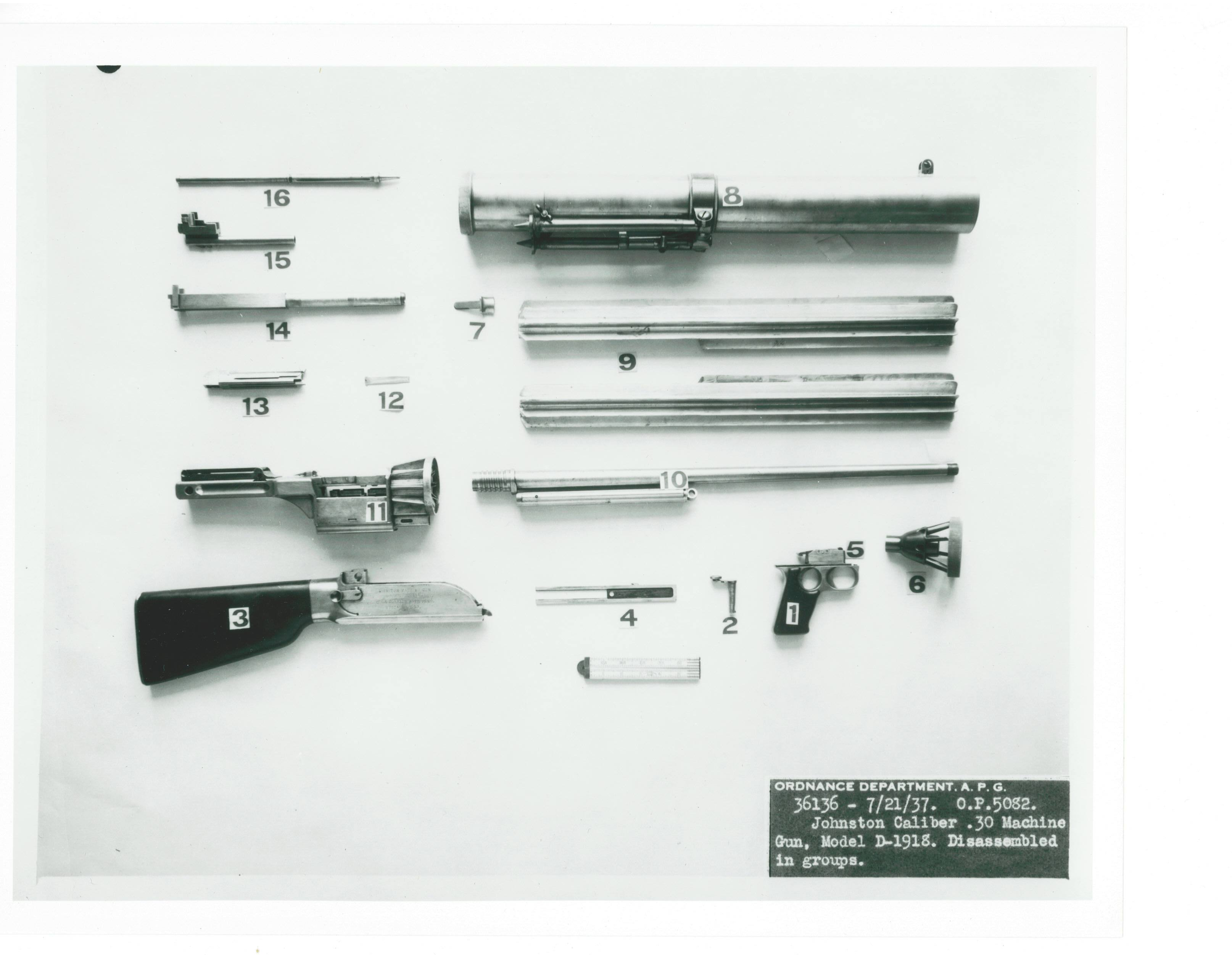
Stripped to major groups

== Variants ==
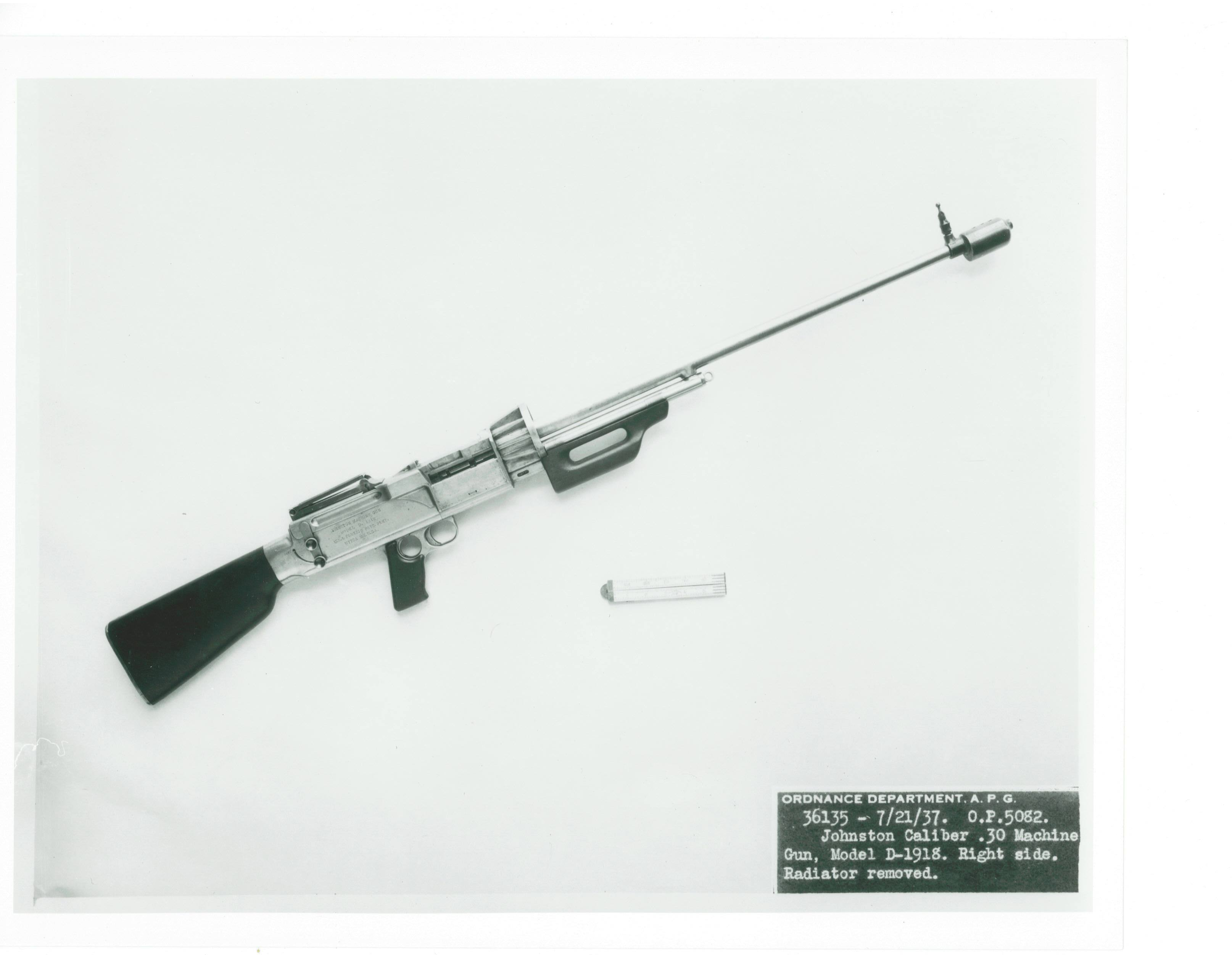
Variant without thermal jacket

A variant was produced without the heat shield jacket and with a bare, unfinned barrel. A muzzle counterweight maintained the normal balance position. A further wooden handgrip was provided ahead of the receiver, as the bare barrel would be too hot to hold, unlike the cooling shroud.
