= Yokosuka P1Y Ginga =

Japanese attack bomber aircraft

P1Y Ginga
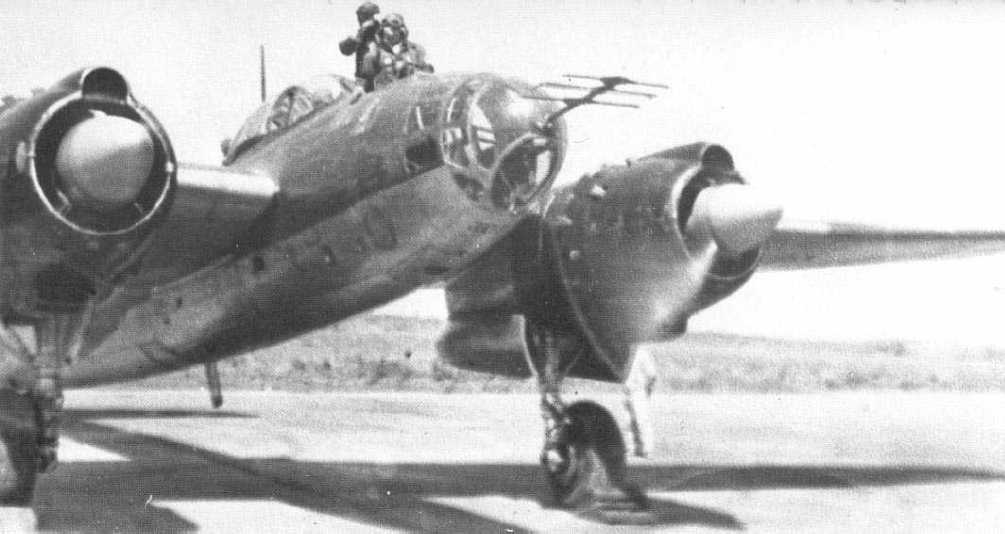

General information
- Type: Attack bomber
- National origin: Empire of Japan
- Manufacturer: Yokosuka (3 × prototype only); Nakajima; Kawanishi (P1Y2 series only)
- Primary user: Imperial Japanese Navy Air Service
- Number built: 1,102

History
- Introduction date: October 1944
- First flight: August 1943
- Retired: 1945

The Yokosuka P1Y Ginga (銀河, galaxy) is a twin-engine, land-based bomber that was designed by the Yokosuka Naval Air Technical Arsenal. Primarily produced by Nakajima and Kawanishi and flown by the Japanese Imperial Navy during the latter half of the Pacific War, it received the Allied reporting name “Frances”.

The P1Y was designed as a successor to the prolific Mitsubishi G4M bomber during the early 1940s. It was designed to fulfil the ambitious performance requirements stipulated in the 15-Shi specification. The resulting aircraft was relatively clean and powered by a pair of Nakajima Homare radial engines, relying on its high speed to evade combatants rather than defensive armaments. The prototypes were commonly praised for their ease of handling and high rate of speed. However, development was protracted due to excess complexity, difficulty of manufacture, and poor serviceability. The Homare engines selected to power the P1Y proved to be both unreliable and limited in quantity. These issues were not full resolved and the Imperial Japanese Navy Air Service (IJNAS) nevertheless introduced the type to service in October 1944, by which point Japan's circumstances in the conflict were unfavourable.

In addition to the standard bomber model, a P1Y2-S Kyokko (極光, Aurora) night fighter model was also developed, on which the issue-prone Homare engine was replaced by the Mitsubishi Kasei, but the P1Y2-S proved incapable of reaching the altitude needed to effectively engage Boeing B-29 Superfortress strategic bombers. Furthermore, numerous P1Ys were expended performing kamikaze attacks against Allied vessels. All remaining aircraft were retired promptly following the Surrender of Japan. A single P1Y1 has been preserved in the US at the National Air and Space Museum.

== Design and development ==
The origins of the Yokosuka P1Y Ginga can be traced back to 1940 and the issuing of the 15-Shi specification, (Note: In the Japanese Navy designation system, specifications were given a Shi number based on the year of the Emperor's reign it was issued. In this case 15-Shi stood for 1940, the 15th year of the Shōwa era.) which called for a new fast bomber for the Japanese Imperial Navy (IJN). The accompanying performance stipulations included an equal top speed to the Mitsubishi A6M Zero carrier fighter, a maximum range at least equal to the Mitsubishi G4M bomber, even while carrying a 907 kg (2,000 lb) bombload and the ability to dive-bomb as well as carry torpedoes. Accordingly, it had to be capable of performing two attack profiles, one suited to dive-bombing as well as a low-altitude attack. According to the aviation historian René J. Francillon, IJN officials sought an indigenously-developed counterpart to overseas bombers such as the Junkers Ju 88, North American B-25 Mitchell, and Douglas A-26 Invader.

To fulfil this specification, a design team, headed by Masao Yamana and Tadanao Mitsuzi, (Note: In the aftermath of World War II, Tadanao would work with the Japan National Railways (JNR) to produce a similar aerodynamic design for the first generation of Japan's Shinkansen bullet trains.) produced a clean twin-engined aircraft with a relatively narrow circular fuselage. Despite its compact dimensions, it could accommodate up to 5,535 litres of fuel in its wings across 14 individual tanks, eight of which were protected. Armour was also provided directly behind the pilot's head, but nowhere else. The aircraft was provided with a limited self-defence capability, having been provisioned with a single flexibly-mounted machine gun in both the nose and rear cockpit; the aircraft was intended to primarily rely on speed to avoid interception instead. In terms of offensive weapons, it could carry either a single 800 kg torpedo in a semi-recessed position underneath the fuselage or two 500 kg bombers within its ventral bomb bay. The powerplant selected to power the type was the Nakajima NK9C Homare 12 18-cylinder radial engine, which was still under development at the time, but its forecast performance would permit the aircraft to attain a top speed in excess of 345 mph.

In August 1943, the first prototype was completed, and performed its maiden flight shortly thereafter. It quickly garnered positive feedback from service pilots, particularly for its favourable handling and high speed. However, ground personnel were typically less enthusiastic due to the aircraft proving to be challenging to maintain; specific trouble areas included its hydraulic system and engines. These difficulties were present even under optimum conditions, and delayed the type's entry into service. Shortly after flight testing commenced, the Nakajima Aircraft Company, which had been selected as the primary manufacturer for the P1Y to replace their existing production line for the Mitsubishi G3M bomber, opted to proceed straight to quantity manufacture. Production aircraft featured only relatively small changes, such as the adoption of a flat bullet-proof panel in place of the curved windscreen fitted to the prototypes, the use of flat head rivets instead of flush ones, and the use of a fixed tailwheel instead of a retractable one. Defensive armaments were also revised, sometimes opting for 13 mm machine guns or 20 mm cannon in place of the 7.7 mm machine guns; some late-production aircraft were also fitted with air-to-sea search radar.

By the end of 1943, 43 P1Y1s had been delivered, although serviceability and reliability concerns delayed their entry into service. In October 1944, the IJN issued its formal acceptance of the P1Y1, which received the service designation Navy Bomber Ginga (Milky Way) Model 11; by this point, 451 aircraft had already been delivered.

In response to the Allied night time bombing campaign against the Japanese home islands, the IJN instructed the Kawanishi Aircraft Company to produce a night fighter model of the aircraft, designated P1Y2-S Kyokko (極光, Aurora). Due to insufficient production volume of the Homare engine, this variant was instead powered by a pair of Mitsubishi Kasei engines. It was equipped with both radar and a Schräge Musik-style upward-firing, as well as forward-firing, nose-mounted 20 mm cannon. The original nose-mounted machine gun of the standard P1Y was eliminated in order to accommodate this new cannon, but the flexibly-mounted 20 mm cannon in the rear cockpit was retained. The P1Y1-S also retained the ventral bomb bay as it was envisioned they could be used for night intruder missions in addition to the night fighter role. A total of 96 P1Y2-Ss were produced by Kawanishi.

== Operational history ==
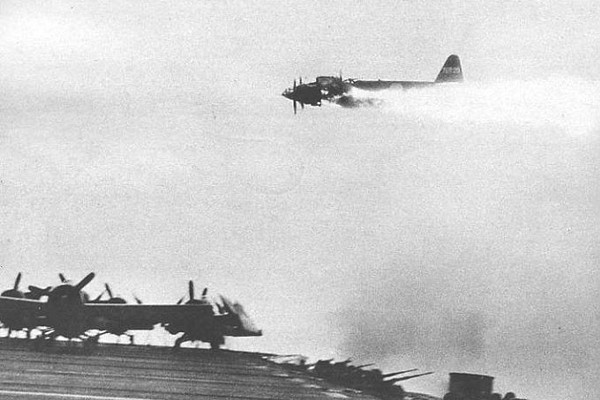
A P1Y shot down next to USS Ommaney Bay (CVE-79) by 0945 on 15 December 1944.

While formally introduced to service with the IJN in October 1944, the P1Y would not fly any combat missions until early 1945 due to persistent maintenance difficulties, particularly with the Homara engine. By the end of the conflict, the P1Y had been operated by a total of five Kōkūtai (Air Groups), which had typically deployed it as a land-based medium and torpedo bombers. The type operated over a geographically diverse range of locations, including China, Taiwan, the Mariana Islands, the Philippines, the Ryukyu Islands, Shikoku, and Kyūshū. Despite only flying combat missions during the final six months of the Pacific War, Allied pilots typically respected the P1Y as being a capable opponent.

The P1Y2-S Kyokko (極光, Aurora) night fighter was also deployed operationally during the closing months of the conflict. In service, the type proved to lack adequate high-altitude performance to be effective against the United States Army Air Force (USAAF) Boeing B-29 Superfortress strategic bombers; accordingly, many P1Y2-Ss were converted into a bomber configuration instead.

During the last stages of the conflict, numerous P1Ys were expended as a kamikaze aircraft. In this capacity, it was used against the United States Navy during the Battle of Okinawa, specifically in Operation Tan No. 2.

== Variants ==
P1Y1 prototype #3 Ko-P1-3, Ishikawajima Tsu-11 testbed in 1944.

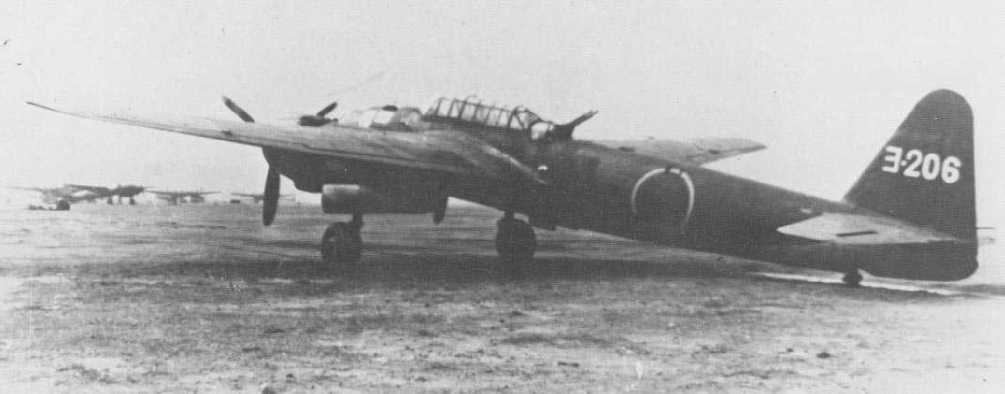
P1Y1b, Yokosuka Kōkūtai Yo-206.

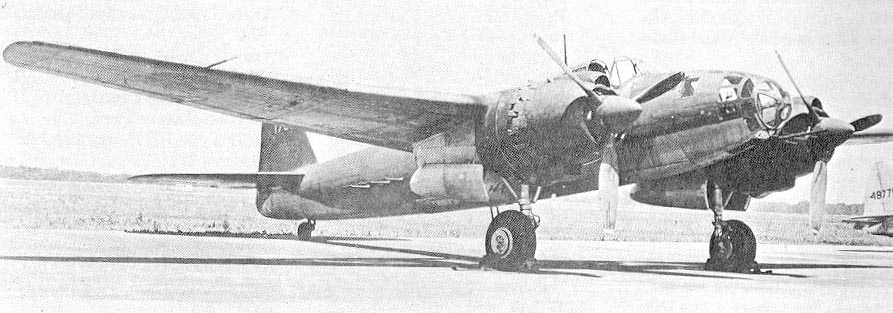
P1Y1c, since it has a single forward cannon, and no dorsal turret.

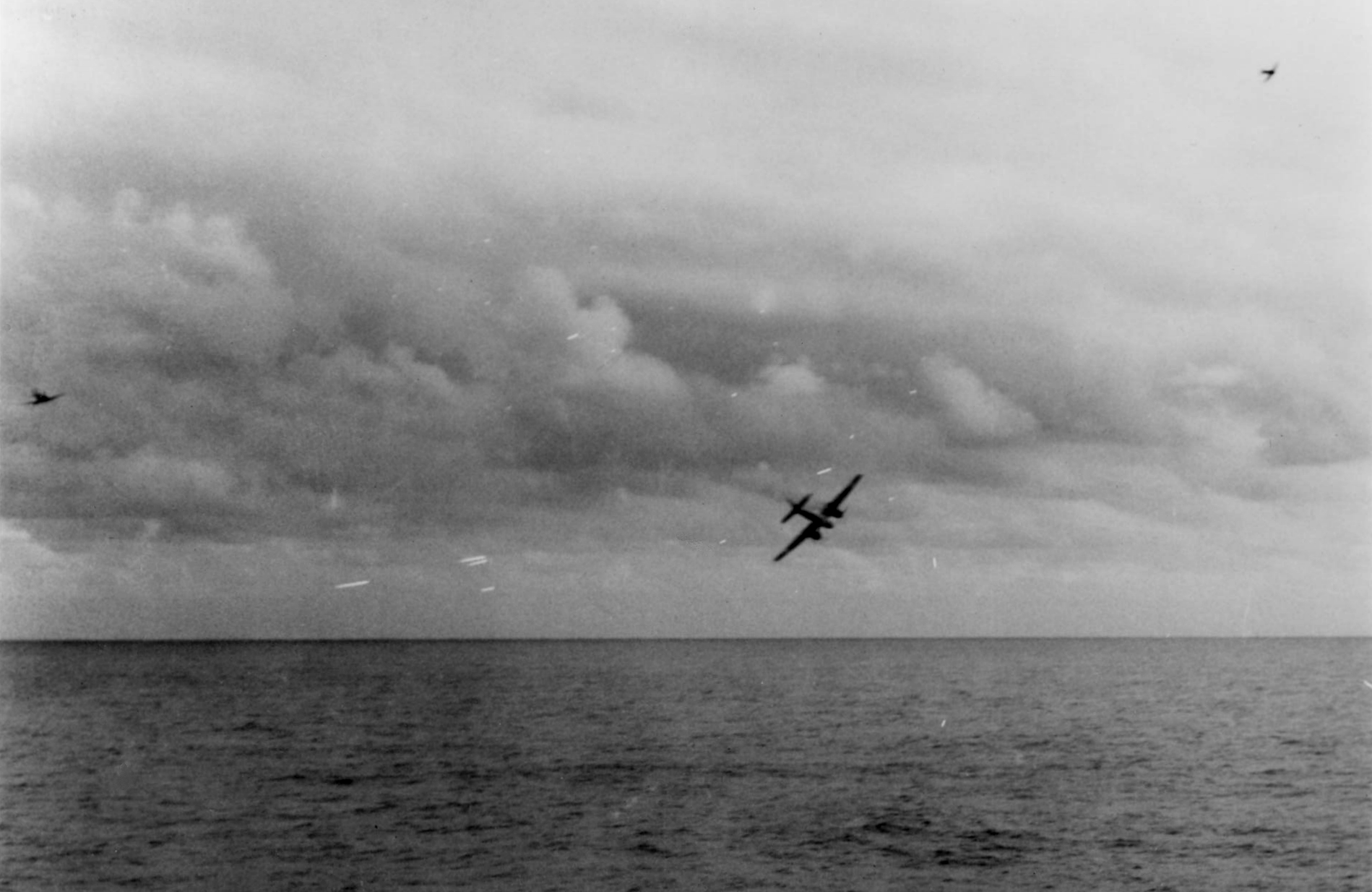
A P1Y1 under attack by United States Navy aircraft and anti-aircraft guns.

P1Y1 Experimental Number 15 land-based bomber (15試陸上爆撃機, 15-Shi Rikujō Bakugekiki)
3 of prototypes and 9 of supplementary prototypes with 1,357 kW (1,820 hp) NK9C Nakajima NK9B Homare 11 engines. Prototype #3 was later used for Ishikawajima Tsu-11 testbed.
P1Y1 Ginga Model 11 (銀河11型, Ginga 11-gata)
First model of the series. Mounted Homare 11 or Homare 12.

P1Y1a Ginga Model 11A (銀河11甲型, Ginga 11 Kō-gata)
Mounted Homare 12, and fitted 1 × 13 mm (0.51 in) Type 2 machine gun in the back defensive position.
P1Y1b Provisional name Ginga Model 11B (仮称銀河11乙型, Kashō Ginga 11 Otsu-gata)
Converted from P1Y1a, mounted Homare 12, and fitted 2 × 13 mm (0.51 in) Type 2 machine guns in the back defensive position.
P1Y1c Provisional name Ginga Model 11C (仮称銀河11丙型, Kashō Ginga 11 Hei-gata)
Converted from P1Y1b, mounted Homare 12, and fitted 1 × 13 mm (0.51 in) Type 2 machine gun in the forward position, prototype only.

P1Y1 Ginga Model 11 Night-fighter variant (銀河11型改造夜戦, Ginga 11-gata Kaizō yasen)
Converted from P1Y1. Armed with 2 × 20 mm (0.79 in) Type 99 cannons. Equipped 302nd Kōkūtai only. This is not a naval regulation equipment.
P1Y1-S Provisional name Ginga Model 21 (仮称銀河21型, Kashō Ginga 21-gata)
Night fighter variant. Armed with 4 × 20 mm (0.79 in) Type 99 cannons firing obliquely forward, and 1 × 13 mm (0.51 in) Type 2 machine gun in the back defensive position. Only a project.
P1Y1 Ground attack variant
Converted from P1Y1/P1Y1a, installed up to 20 × 20 mm (0.79 in) Type 99 cannons in the bomb bay for land strikes against B-29 bases in the Marianas. Approx. 30 rebuilt.
P1Y2-S Provisional name Ginga Model 26/Test production Kyokkō (仮称銀河26型/試製極光, Kashō Ginga 26-gata/Shisei Kyokkō)
Night fighter variant. Initial named Hakkō (白光, Corona) in October 1943, renamed Kyokkō (極光, Aurora) in March 1944. Converted from P1Y1/P1Y1a. Fitted Mitsubishi MK4T-A Kasei 25 engines. Armed with 2 × 20 mm (0.79 in)Type 99 cannons and 1 × 30 mm (1.2 in) Type 5 cannon. Later, almost all were converted to P1Y2. 96 or 97 produced.
P1Y2 Provisional name Ginga Model 16 (仮称銀河16型, Kashō Ginga 16-gata)
Land based bomber. Converted from P1Y2-S. Mounted 1,380 kW (1,850 hp) Mitsubishi MK4T-A Kasei 25 Kō engines.

P1Y2a Provisional name Ginga Model 16A (仮称銀河16甲型, Kashō Ginga 16 Kō-gata)
Converted from P1Y1a. Mounted Mitsubishi MK4T-A Kasei 25 Kō engines.
P1Y2b Provisional name Ginga Model 16B (仮称銀河16乙型, Kashō Ginga 16 Otsu-gata)
Converted from P1Y1b. Mounted Mitsubishi MK4T-A Kasei 25 Kō engines.
P1Y2c Provisional name Ginga Model 16C (仮称銀河16丙型, Kashō Ginga 16 Hei-gata)
Converted from P1Y1c. Mounted Mitsubishi MK4T-A Kasei 25 Kō engines.

P1Y2 Ginga Model 16 Night-fighter variant (銀河16型改造夜戦, Ginga 16-gata Kaizō yasen)
Converted from P1Y2. Armed with 2 × 20 mm (0.79 in) Type 99 machine guns or 1 × 30 mm (1.2 in) Type 5 cannon. Equipped 302nd Kōkūtai only. This is not a naval regulation equipment.
P1Y3 Provisional name Ginga Model 13 (仮称銀河13型, Kashō Ginga 13-gata)
Converted from P1Y1. Mounted Homare 21 engines.
P1Y4 Provisional name Ginga Model 12 (仮称銀河12型, Kashō Ginga 12-gata)
Converted from P1Y1. Mounted Homare 23 engines.
P1Y5 Provisional name Ginga Model 14 (仮称銀河14型, Kashō Ginga 14-gata)
Converted from P1Y1. Mounted Mitsubishi Ha-43 engines.
P1Y6 Provisional name Ginga Model 17 (仮称銀河17型, Kashō Ginga 17-gata)
Converted from P1Y2. Mounted Mitsubishi MK4T-C Kasei 25 Hei engines.
Provisional name Ginga Model 33 (仮称銀河33型, Kashō Ginga 33-gata)
Long-range bomber variant. Crew: 4, with up to 3,000 kg (6,600 lb) bombs. Only a project.
Test production Tenga (試製天河, Shisei Tenga)
Proposed jet-powered bomber variant, mounted Ishikawajima Ne-30. Discontinued in 1945.
MXY10 Yokosuka Navy Bomber Ginga
Ground decoy non-flying replica of Yokosuka P1Y1.

== Number built by Nakajima and Kawanishi ==
	January	February	March	April	May	June	July	August	September	October	November	December	Sub total
1943								2	4	4	10	25	45
1944	11	20	35	46	46	51	47	48	69	75	88	84	620
1945	90	52	52	63	64	53	40	20					434

== Operators ==
Japan

- Imperial Japanese Navy Air Service
  - 302nd Kōkūtai: Equipped night fighter variant only.
  - 521st Kōkūtai
  - 522nd Kōkūtai
  - 523rd Kōkūtai
  - 524th Kōkūtai
  - 701st Kōkūtai
  - 706th Kōkūtai
  - 752nd Kōkūtai
  - 761st Kōkūtai
  - 762nd Kōkūtai
  - 763rd Kōkūtai
  - 765th Kōkūtai
  - 1001st Kōkūtai
  - 1081st Kōkūtai
  - Miyazaki Kōkūtai
  - Toyohashi Kōkūtai
  - Yokosuka Kōkūtai
  - Kogeki 262nd Hikōtai
  - Kogeki 401st Hikōtai
  - Kogeki 405th Hikōtai
  - Kogeki 406th Hikōtai
  - Kogeki 501st Hikōtai
  - Kogeki 708th Hikōtai

== Surviving aircraft ==
A P1Y1 survives at the Smithsonian's Paul Garber Facility of its National Air and Space Museum. While only the fuselage has been photographed several times and can be found on the internet, the wings and engines are confirmed to exist. This was one of three P1Ys that were brought back to the United States after World War II for evaluation.

== Specifications (P1Y1a) ==
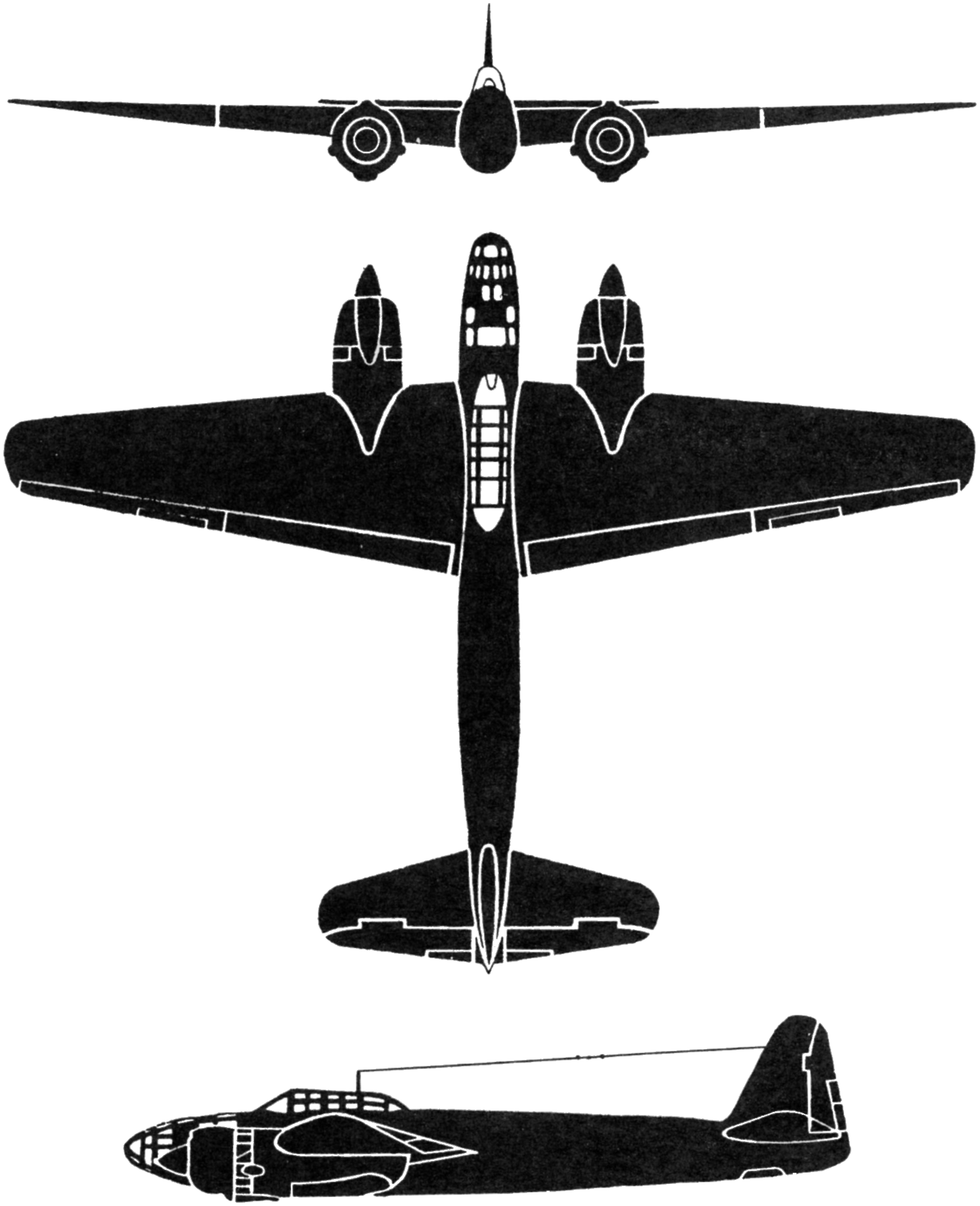
3-view silhouette of the Yokosuka P1Y

Data from Japanese Aircraft of the Pacific War

General characteristics

- Crew: 3
- Length: 15 m (49 ft 3 in)
- Wingspan: 20 m (65 ft 7 in)
- Height: 4.3 m (14 ft 1 in)
- Wing area: 55 m^{2} (590 sq ft)
- Empty weight: 7,265 kg (16,017 lb)
- Gross weight: 10,500 kg (23,149 lb)
- Max takeoff weight: 13,500 kg (29,762 lb)
- Powerplant: 2 × Nakajima NK9C Homare 12 18-cylinder air-cooled radial piston engines, 1,361 kW (1,825 hp) each for take-off

Performance

- Maximum speed: 547 km/h (340 mph, 295 kn) at 5,900 m (19,400 ft)
- Cruise speed: 370 km/h (230 mph, 200 kn) at 4,000 m (13,000 ft)
- Range: 5,370 km (3,340 mi, 2,900 nmi)
- Service ceiling: 9,400 m (30,800 ft)
- Wing loading: 191 kg/m^{2} (39 lb/sq ft)
- Power/mass: 0.20 kW/kg (0.12 hp/lb)

Armament

- Guns:

- 1× flexible, nose-mounted 20 mm (0.787 in) Type 99 cannon
- 1× flexible rear-firing 13 mm (0.512 in) Type 2 machine gun

- Bombs:

- up to 1,000 kg (2,205 lb) of bombs or 1× 800 kg (1,764 lb) torpedo

== See also ==
Related development

- Yokosuka Tenga

Aircraft of comparable role, configuration, and era

- Douglas A-26 Invader
- Junkers Ju 188
- Liore et Olivier LeO 45
- Petlyakov Pe-2
- Saab 18

Related lists

- List of aircraft of World War II
