= McCrudden light machine rifle =

McCrudden light machine rifle Mk1
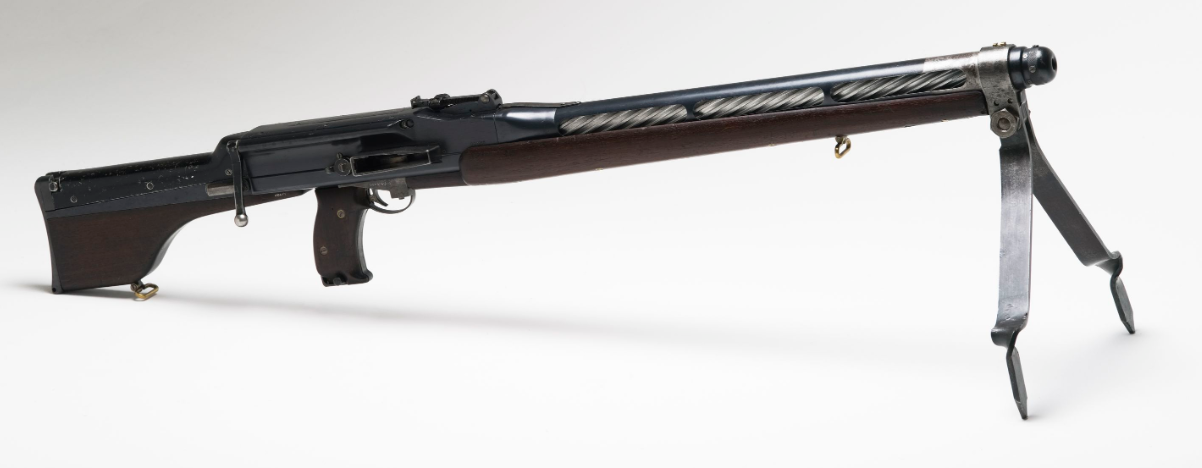
- Type: Light machine gun
- Place of origin: Australia

Production history
- Designer: John McCrudden
- Designed: 1919, 1921
- Produced: 1919, 1921,
- No. built: 2

Specifications
- Cartridge: .303 British
- Action: Recoil operated
- Rate of fire: 800rpm

The McCrudden light machine rifle is a light machine gun of Australian origin.

== History ==
The McCrudden light machine rifle was invented by ex-Australian serviceman John Charles Raginald McCrudden (known as Reg) following his discharge from the AIF in 1917. It is believed there are only two surviving examples of this interesting weapon, one being held in the Pattern Room in Leeds, England. The other McCrudden Light Machine Rifle Mk1 is on extended loan to the Power House Museum exhibition in Sydney, Australia.

McCrudden's first hand-built prototype was believed to have been manufactured at an engineering workshop in Randwick, Sydney. McCrudden and his guns traveled from Sydney to Jervis Bay for an audience with Commodore J S Dumaresq and Lt Cmdr Burgh. He was received favorably and recommendations were made that he should take the gun to England for assessment by the British War Office, Dumaresq forwarding a favorable report in light of the Navy's pending trials to select a weapon to replace the Lewis Gun. Following Dumaresq's advice McCrudden took his designs to England where he had additional weapons made by Kingsway Manufacturing Company Ltd in London.

== Overview ==
According to a press report in the Daily Telegraph of August 6, 1921 McCrudden alleged that his gun was foolproof, with only seven moving parts and had the advantage of having a variable rate of fire adjustable to ‘fire one or 800 rounds per minute as easily as one can operate a throttle’. In addition the gun could also be easily converted to water cooling for sustained fire.

Both the Mk and the later Miki suffered chronic misfeeds due to the internal design of the gun and the location of the magazine at the side of the gun. Had McCrudden relocated the magazine to the top, he may well have had a successful design.

== See also ==
- List of machine guns
- M1918 Browning automatic rifle
