= Guntō =

Japanese military sword, 1872-1945

Guntō (軍刀)
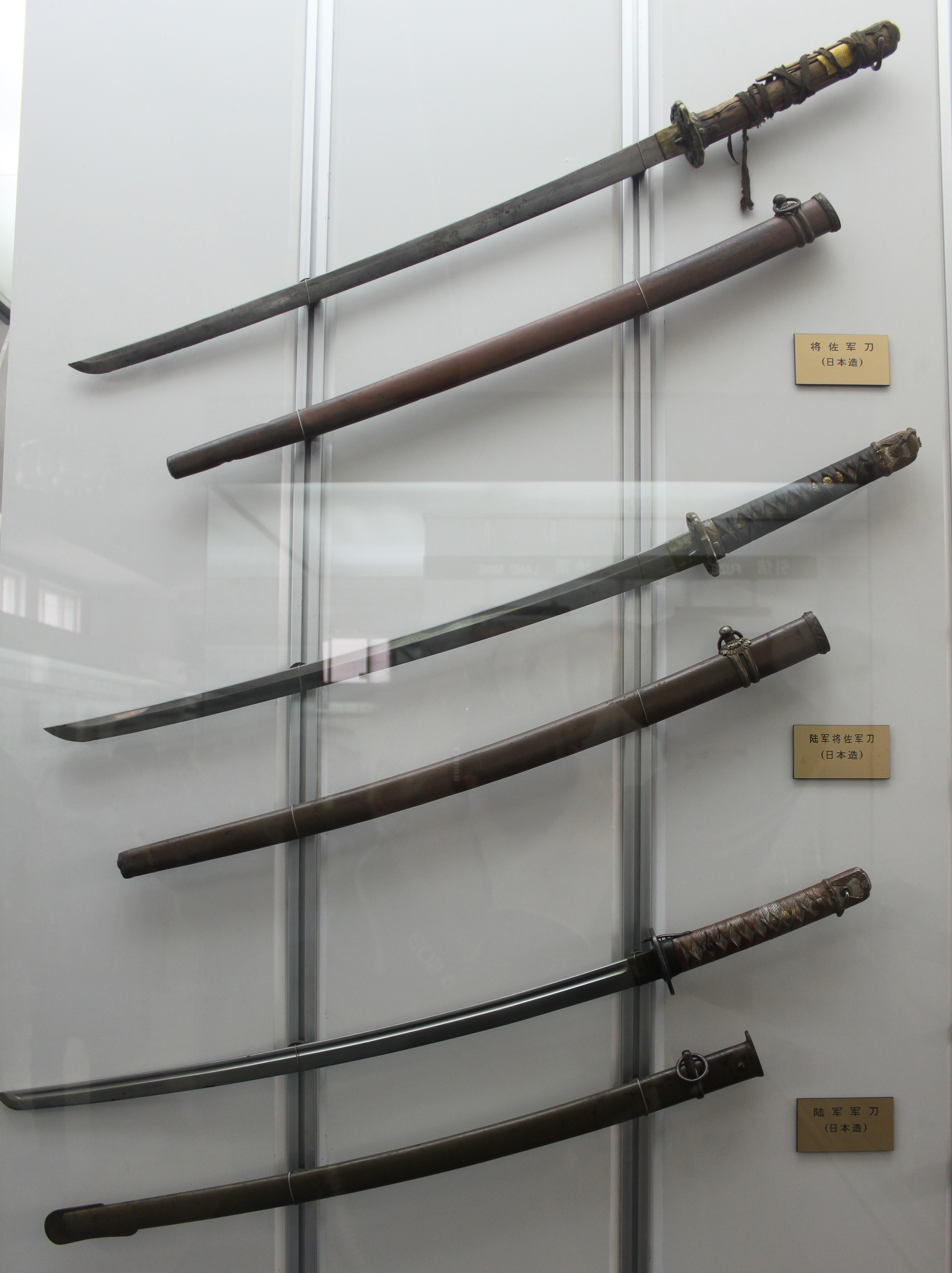
- Type 95 Gunto (bottom) and Guntō for officers
- Type: Japanese sword
- Place of origin: Empire of Japan

Production history
- Designer: Various
- Manufacturer: Various
- Produced: Meiji era to mid Shōwa era

Specifications
- Length: overall length: 100 cm (39 in)
- Blade length: blade length: 60 cm (24 in)
- Blade type: Curved, single-edged
- Hilt type: Wood, leather, metal, fish skin, metal wire
- Scabbard/sheath: Lacquered wood, leather, metal or ray skin (same)

The guntō (軍刀; military sword) is a ceremonial sword that was produced for the Imperial Japanese army and navy after the introduction of conscription in 1872.

== History ==
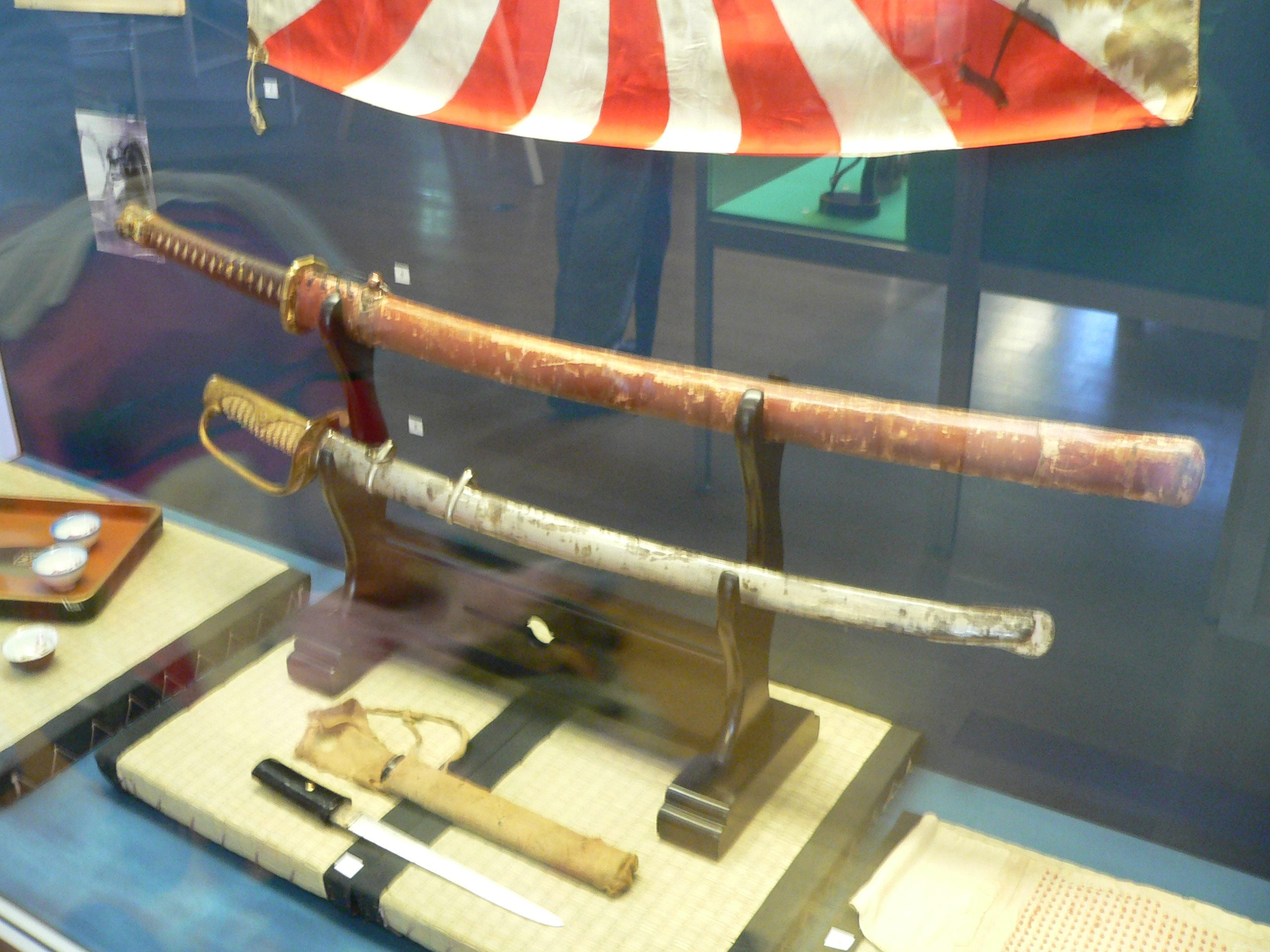
Two antique Japanese guntō swords on a sword rack (katana kake), shin guntō on top and kyū guntō below

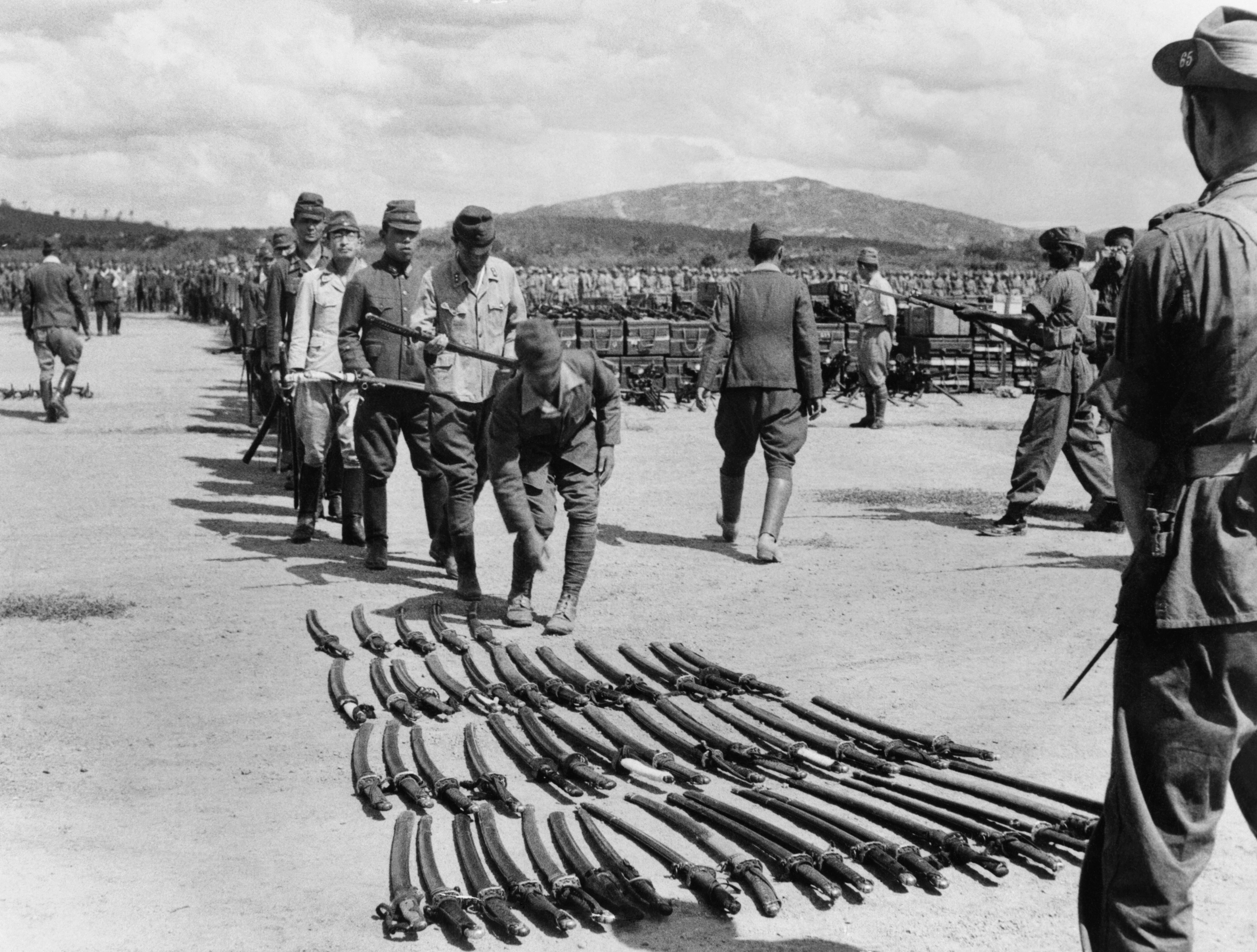
A long line of Japanese officers wait to surrender their swords to the 25th Indian Division in Kuala Lumpur, 1945.

During the Meiji period, the samurai class was gradually disbanded, and the Haitōrei Edict in 1876 forbade the carrying of swords in public except for certain individuals such as former samurai lords (daimyō), the military and police. Skilled swordsmiths had trouble making a living during this period as Japan modernized its military and many swordsmiths started making other items such as cutlery. Military action by Japan in China and Russia during the Meiji Period helped revive the manufacture of swords and in the Shōwa period (1926–1989) before and during World War II swords were once again produced on a large scale.

During the pre–World War II military buildup and throughout the war, all Japanese officers were required to wear a sword. Traditionally made swords were produced during this period but, in order to supply such large numbers of swords, blacksmiths with little or no knowledge of traditional Japanese sword manufacture were recruited. In addition, supplies of the type of Japanese steel (tamahagane) used for sword making were limited so several other types of steel were substituted. Shortcuts in forging were also taken, such as the use of power hammers and tempering the blade in oil rather than hand forging and water tempering; these measures created swords without the usual characteristics associated with Japanese swords.

The non-traditionally made swords from this period are called Shōwatō. In 1937, the Japanese government started requiring the use of special stamps on the tang to distinguish these swords from traditionally made swords. During this wartime period antique swords from older time periods were remounted for use in the military. In Japan, shōwatō are not considered to be true Japanese swords, and they can be confiscated. Outside Japan they are collected as historical artifacts.

== Types ==
=== Kyū guntō ===
The first standard sword of the Japanese military was known as the kyū guntō (旧軍刀, old military sword). Murata Tsuneyoshi (1838–1921), a Japanese general who previously made guns, started making what was probably the first mass-produced substitute for traditionally made samurai swords.

These swords are referred to as Murata-tō and they were used in both the Sino-Japanese War (1894–1895) and the Russo-Japanese War (1904–1905).

The kyū guntō was used from 1872 until 1934, and many styles closely resembled European and American swords of the time, with a wraparound hand guard (also known as a D-guard) and chrome plated scabbard (saya), the steel scabbard is said to have been introduced around 1900.

Prior to 1945, many kyū guntō were distributed to commissioned officers to fill a demand for swords to Japan's expanding military officer classes. To distinguish individuality, wealth or craftsmanship, many swords were produced in batches as small as 1–25 to maintain the legacy of sword culture.

Styles varied greatly, with inspirations drawn from swords of early periods, familial crests, and experimental artistic forms that the Meiji Restoration period had begun to introduce. Some examples have included European style silverworking, jade, cloisonné, or metalwork and paint for artistic relief.

=== Shin guntō ===
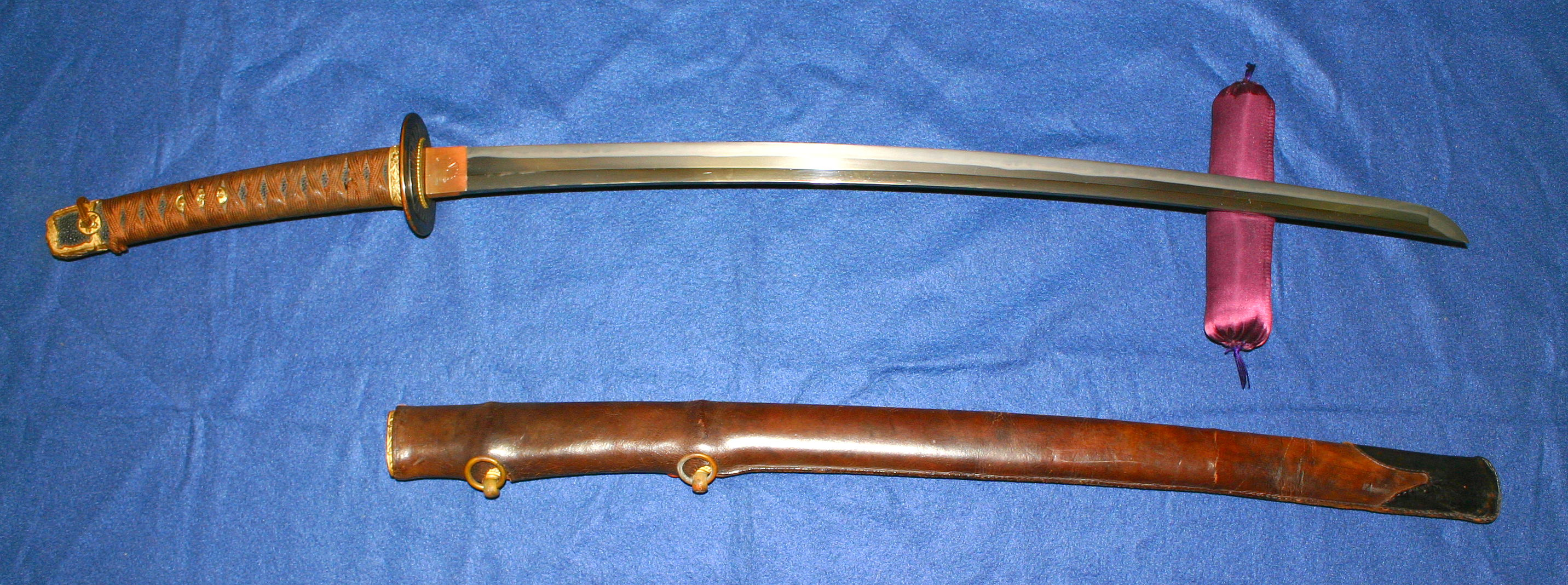
Shin gunto with leather combat cover

The shin guntō (新軍刀, new military sword) was a weapon and symbol of rank used by the Imperial Japanese Army, between the years of 1935–1945. During most of that period, the swords were manufactured at the Toyokawa Naval Arsenal.

In response to rising nationalism within the armed forces, a new style of sword was designed for the Japanese military in 1934. The shin guntō was styled after a traditional slung tachi of the Kamakura Period (1185–1332). Officers' ranks were indicated by coloured tassels tied to a loop at the end of the hilt.

The corresponding colors were brown-red and gold for generals; brown and red for field officers; brown and blue for company or warrant officers; brown for sergeants major, sergeants, or corporals.

The blades found in shin guntō ranged from modern machine-made blades through contemporary traditionally-manufactured blades to ancestral blades dating back hundreds of years.

After the Second World War's conclusion, most produced guntō were made to resemble the traditionally cloth wrapped shin-gunto swords, but out of a solid metal casting. On later models the hilts were made of aluminum and painted to resemble the lacing (ito) on officer's shin-guntō swords.

These swords will have serial numbers on their blades and are nearly always machine made. If the sword is all original, the serial numbers on the blade, tsuba, saya and all other parts should match.

== Military usage ==
=== Type 94 ===
The Type 94 shin guntō (九四式軍刀, kyūyon-shiki guntō) officers' sword replaced the Western style kyu gunto in 1934.

It had a traditionally constructed hilt (tsuka) with ray skin (same) wrapped with traditional silk wrapping (ito). A cherry blossom (a symbol of the Imperial Japanese Army) theme was incorporated into the guard (tsuba), pommels (fuchi and kashira), and ornaments (menuki).

The scabbard for the Type 94 was made of metal with a wood lining to protect the blade. It was often painted brown and was suspended from two brass mounts, one of which was removable and only used when in full dress uniform. The fittings on the scabbard were also decorated with cherry blossom designs.

=== Type 95 ===
The Type 95 shin guntō (九十五式軍刀, kyūgō-shiki guntō) released in 1935 was designed for use by non-commissioned officers (NCOs).

It was designed to resemble an officer's shin guntō but be cheaper to mass-produce. All NCOs' swords had machine-made blades with deep fullers (bo hi) and a serial number stamped on the blade in arabic numerals.

Initially the hilts were cast out of metal (either copper or aluminium) and painted to resemble the traditionally produced items on the officer's swords. They had brass guards similar to the officer's shin guntō.

By 1945, a simplified NCO sword was being produced. It had a simple wooden hilt with cross hatched grooves for grip. The scabbards were made from wood instead of metal and the guard and other fittings were made from iron instead of brass.

=== Type 98 ===
The change to the Type 98 shin guntō (九八式軍刀, kyūhachi-shiki guntō) occurred in 1938 and was essentially a simplification of the Type 94.

There were only minor differences between early Type 98 swords and the Type 94 swords that preceded them. Most notably the second (removable) hanging point was omitted from the scabbard.

Many changes occurred to the Type 98 between 1938 and the end of the war in 1945. Late in the war Japan's supply of metal was drying up and shin guntō were produced with painted wooden scabbards, and with cheaper or no brass ornamentation.

Some of the final swords produced in the last year of the war utilized cheap copper or blackened iron fittings.

=== Kaiguntō ===
Kaiguntō (海軍刀, naval sword) are the less common naval versions of the shin guntō.

Some kai guntō were produced with stainless steel blades.

== Gallery ==
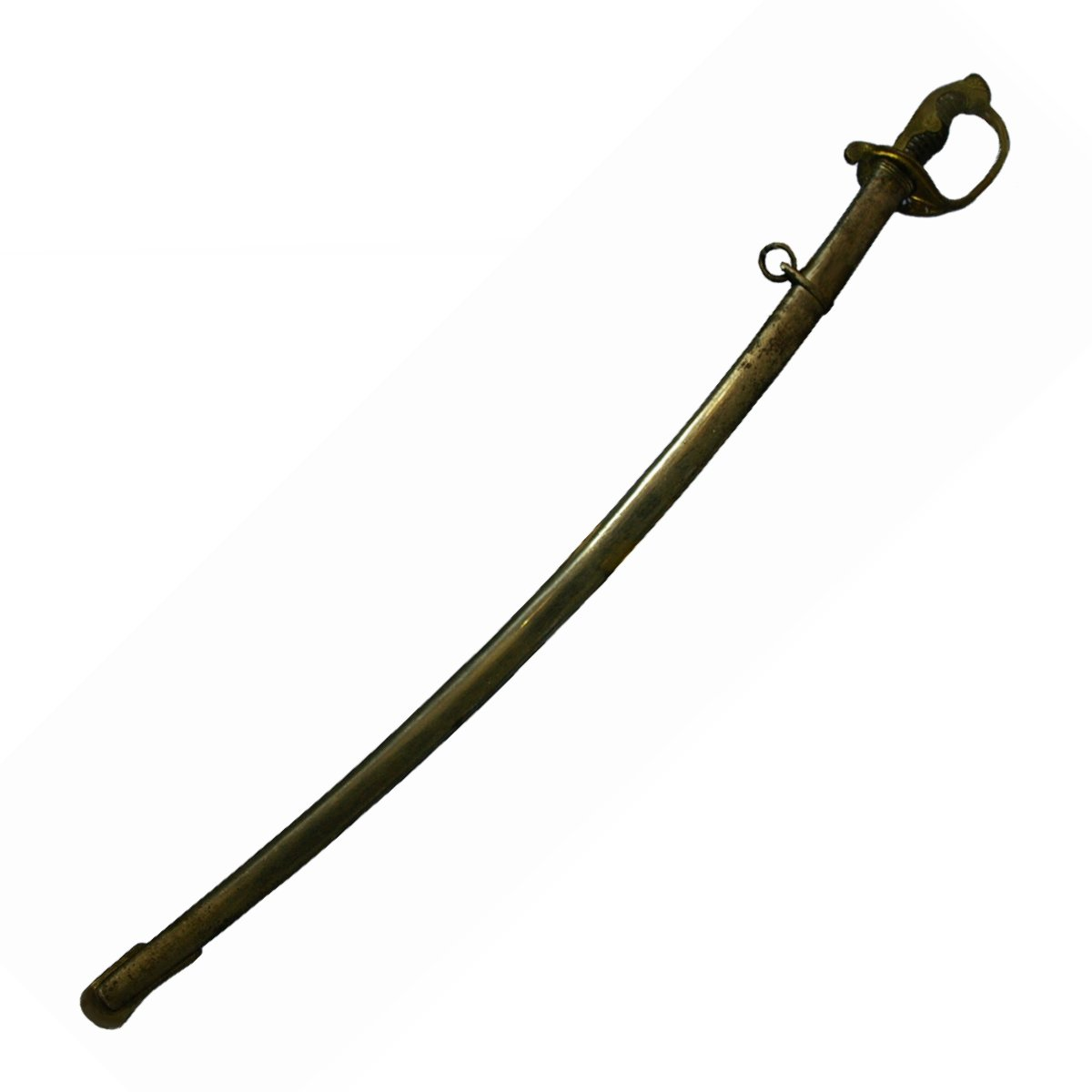
Kyū guntō

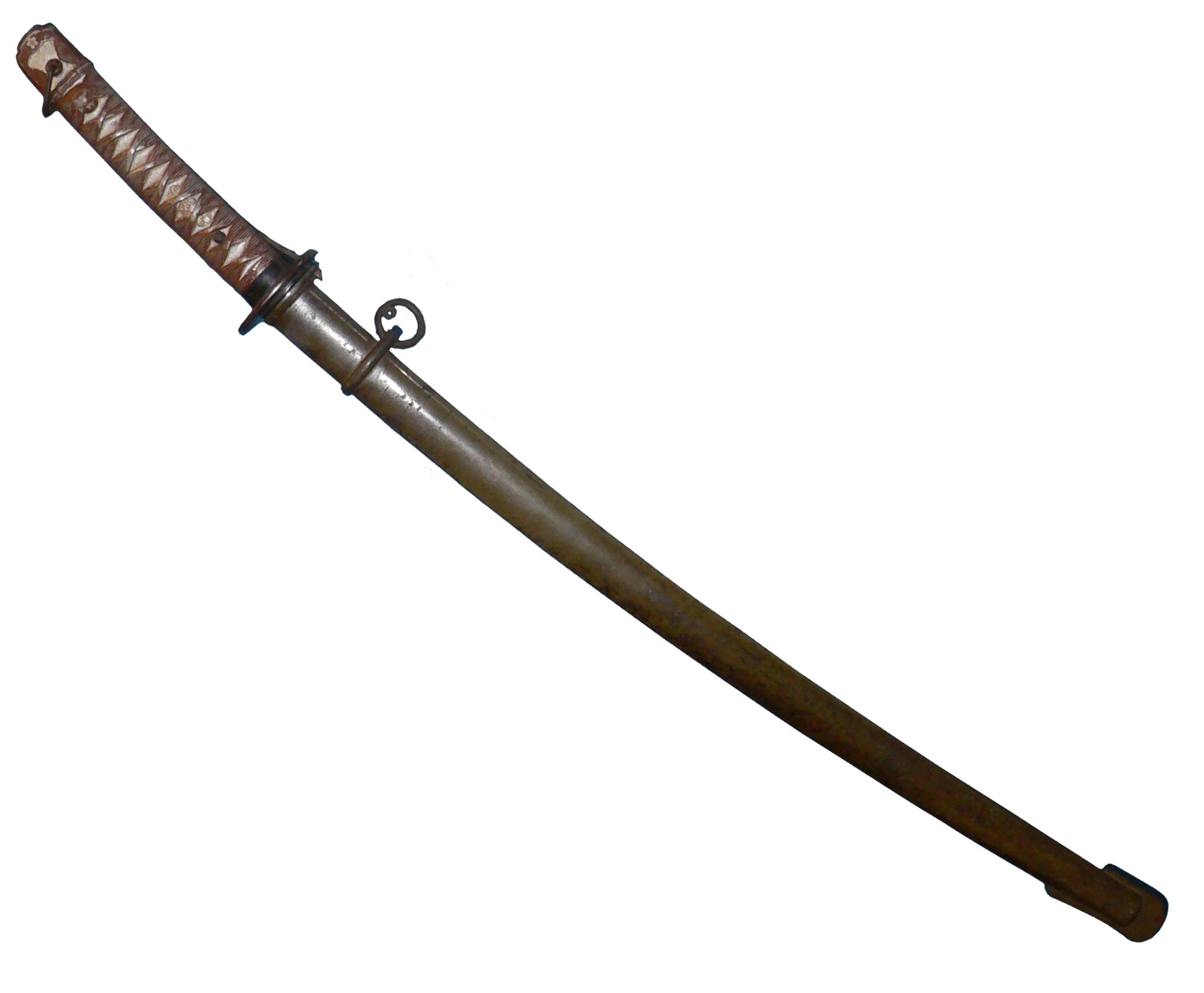
Type 95 non-commissioned officer's sabre, with a cast metal painted hilt designed to look like a traditionally wrapped tsuka

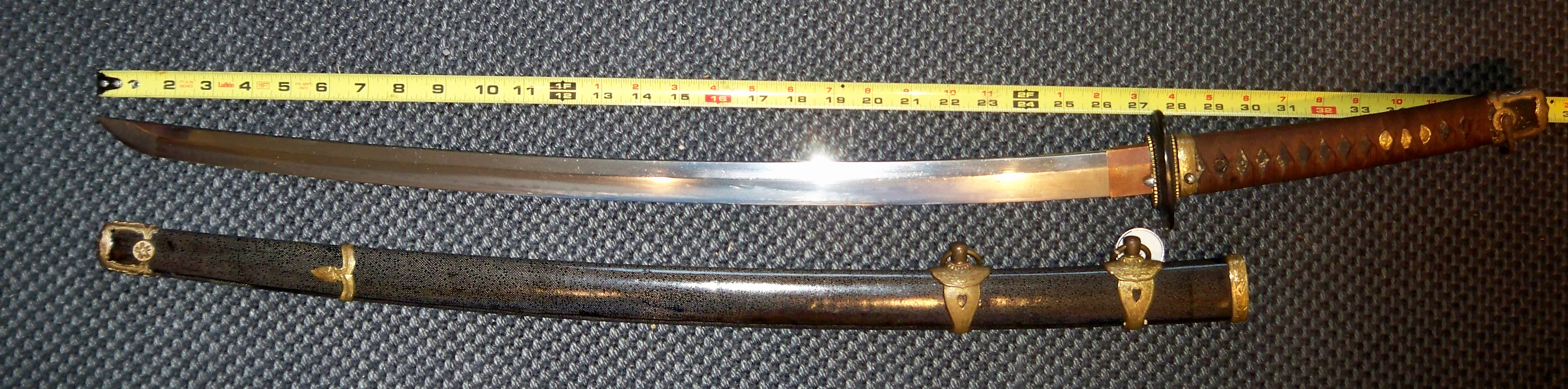
Kai guntō with a ray-skin scabbard

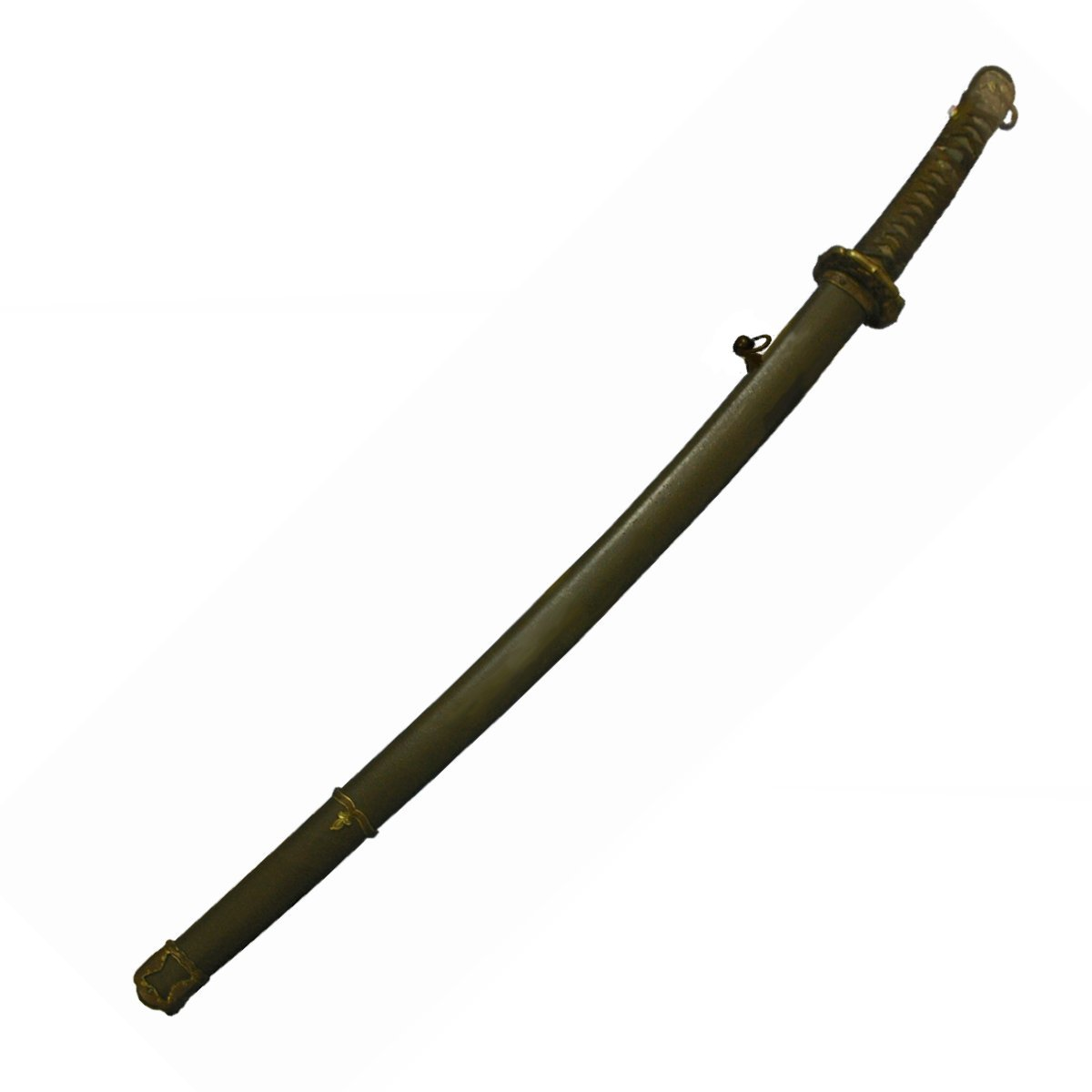
Type 98 army sabre

== See also ==
- List of weapons of the Japanese Empire during World War II
