= Type 2 machine gun =

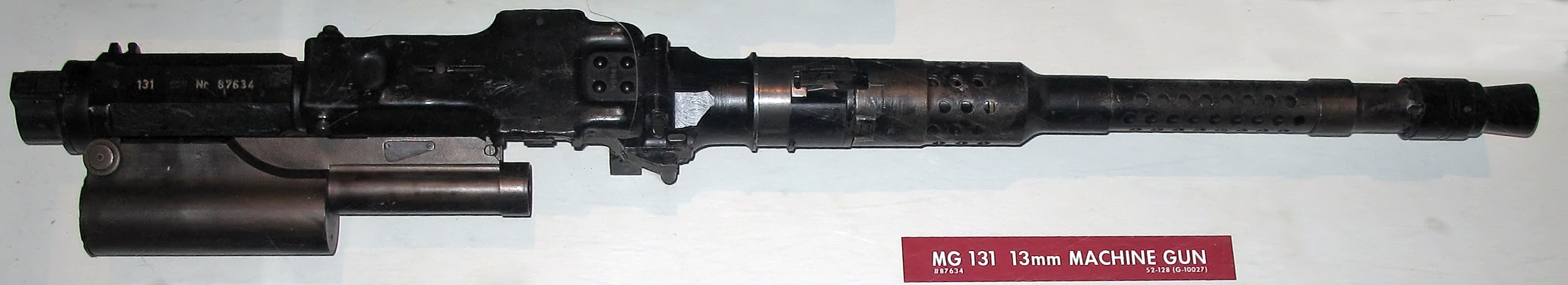
- A German MG 131, which the Type 2 was adapted from
- Type: Heavy machine gun
- Place of origin: Empire of Japan

Service history
- In service: 1942–1945
- Used by: Imperial Japanese Navy
- Wars: World War II

Production history
- Designer: Rheinmetall-Borsig AG
- Manufacturer: KK Nihon Seikoujo; Suzuka Naval Arsenal; Toyokawa Naval Arsenal

Specifications
- Mass: 17.4 kg (38 lb)
- Length: 1,170 mm (46 in)
- Cartridge: 13×64mmB
- Caliber: 13 mm (0.51 in)
- Rate of fire: 900 RPM
- Muzzle velocity: 750 m/s (2,500 ft/s)
- Feed system: Disintegrating belt
- Sights: Iron

The Type 2 machine gun was developed for aerial use for the Imperial Japanese Navy during World War II. It was a license-built copy of the German MG 131 machine gun.

== Installations ==
- Aichi B7A
- Aichi E16A
- Mitsubishi A6M5c
- Mitsubishi G4M
- Nakajima B6N
- Yokosuka P1Y
