= Caldwell machine gun =

- Type: Machine gun
- Place of origin: Australia

Production history
- Designer: Thomas F. Caldwell
- Designed: 1915

Specifications
- Mass: 38 lb (17 kg)
- Cartridge: .303 British (7.7×56mmR)
- Caliber: .303 (7.7 mm)
- Barrels: 2
- Rate of fire: 500rpm
- Feed system: 104 round magazines

The Caldwell machine gun is a machine gun of Australian origin developed by Thomas Frederick Caldwell in 1915.

== History ==
The Caldwell machine gun was designed by Thomas F. Caldwell of Melbourne, who moved to the United Kingdom to bring his invention to the notice of British Army authorities. The weapon was in appearance similar to the Maxim gun, but came with two barrels, capable of working in conjunction or separately with a discharge of 500 rpm. It used pan magazines containing 104 rounds instead of the belt feed of the Maxim gun, which was prone to jamming.

As reported at the time:

"The Caldwell Machine Gun Company's invention of a quick-firing machine gun was recently sent to London in charge of Captain O. H. Moss and the inventor (Mr. T. F. Caldwell). The directors have now received information from their representatives and Messrs. Light and Fulton, solicitors to the company in London, that the gun has been sold, subject to certain conditions, for £5,000 in cash, £1 per gun royalty on all guns manufactured in Great Britain, and ten per cent of the consideration received from the sale of foreign rights or licenses The manufacturers are now completing a new gun under the supervision of Mr. Caldwell, whose services have been taken over at £1,000 per annum. The new gun will shortly be submitted to the Admiralty".

== Overview ==
The weapon has two barrels and is chambered for the .303 British round. The cooling jacket is similar to the Maxim gun but comes with a steam valve. The Caldwell is lighter and simpler than the Maxim and can be field-stripped in under one minute without the use of tools. The rate of fire of the Caldwell is variable as the gun is fired with a hand crank with the rate of fire dependent on the operator.

== See also ==
- List of machine guns
- List of multiple-barrel firearms
