= Garanin general-purpose machine guns =

Garanin machine gun
- Type: General-purpose machine gun
- Place of origin: Soviet Union

Production history
- Designer: Georgy Garanin
- Designed: 1957
- Variants: 2B-P-10; 2B-P-45 (gas-operated)

Specifications
- Cartridge: 7.62×54mmR
- Caliber: 7.62mm
- Action: Lever-delayed blowback (first variant), gas operated (second variant)
- Feed system: Belt
- Sights: Iron

The Garanin machine guns (Пулемёт Гаранина) were a series of general-purpose machine gun prototypes developed by Soviet designer Georgy Semenovich Garanin at OKB-575 in Kovrov. These guns were developed in the context of a contest, started in December 1955, for replacing the company-level RP-46 light machine gun and the battalion-level "heavy" (in the old sense of the term) machine gun SGM with a single new machine gun that could fulfill both roles using different mounts.

Garanin's first prototype for this competition operated on the principle of lever-delayed blowback. This prototype was rejected in 1957 for failing to meet several of the technical requirements for accuracy and reliability. A later prototype of Garanin relied on gas operation; this one was rejected in 1960, because it was considered inferior to the front-runner designs of Nikitin and Kalashnikov. Ultimately, Kalashnikov's PK machine gun won the competition.

== Overview (first variant) ==
The weapon was unusual among contemporary machine guns by its use of a lever-delayed blowback operation. When firing, the pressure pushing the case head rearward initiated an impulse on a cam that sent the bolt carrier rearward. After a certain distance, a link (in this case the firing pin) pulled the bolt head, hence extracting the spent case. Since there was no primary extraction, the chamber was fluted to allow powder gases to flow back, unsticking the case from the wall chamber like on Heckler & Koch type roller-delayed blowback weapons.

The machine gun could be used as a LMG with a bipod or as a medium machine gun with a tripod. When used with a tripod for continuous fire, the gun was fitted with a heavier barrel. In the LMG configuration, the machine gun was a relatively light weapon to carry. The lower receiver of the weapon came from an RPD with a modified stock.

== See also ==
- KB-P-790
- List of Russian weaponry

== External images ==
- 1,
- 2
- 2B-P-45
