= Tank machine gun type 95/98 =

The Type 95/98 machine gun was designed by Prototypa, a.s. (Czech Republic). This weapon is intended for the modernized Czech T-72 tanks.

This gun can fire both 7.62×51 NATO and 7.62×54R ammunition.
