= KB-P-790 =

KB-P 790
- Type: Light machine gun
- Place of origin: Soviet Union

Production history
- Designer: Degtyarev; Garanin
- Manufacturer: KBP

Specifications
- Cartridge: 7.62×39mm
- Caliber: 7.62mm
- Barrels: 1
- Action: Lever-delayed blowback
- Maximum firing range: 1000 m
- Feed system: Belt
- Sights: Iron

The KB-P 790 (Дегтярёва Гаранина инд. КБ-П-790) is a light machine gun prototype of Soviet origin. The weapon uses a delayed blowback operation and is chambered in the 7.62×39mm round.

Also known as the Degtyarev-Garanin, it was one of the four competitors in the contest for replacing the RPD. Ultimately it lost to Kalashnikov's RPK.

== See also ==
- Garanin machine guns
- List of Russian weaponry
