= T24 machine gun =

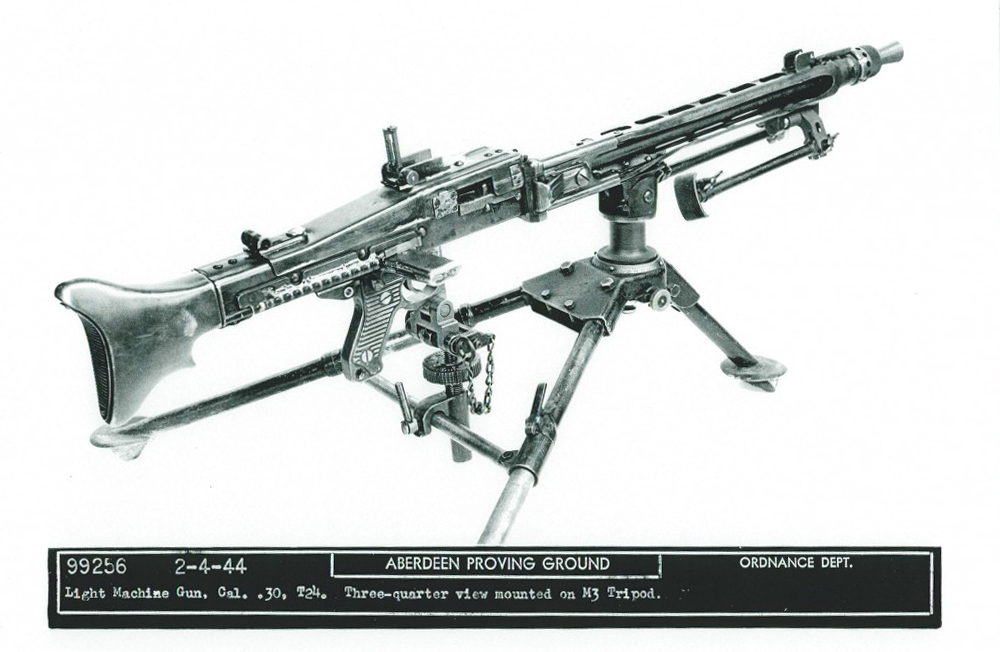
- T24 Machine gun prototype mounted on a tripod
- Type: General-purpose machine gun
- Place of origin: United States

Service history
- In service: n/a
- Used by: n/a
- Wars: n/a

Production history
- Designed: 1944
- Manufacturer: Saginaw Steering Gear

Specifications
- Mass: 390 oz (11.1 kg) without bipod and tripod adapter
- Length: 46.875 in (1,191 mm)
- Barrel length: 20.813 in (530 mm)
- Cartridge: .30-06 Springfield
- Caliber: 7.62 mm
- Action: Recoil-operated, roller-locked
- Rate of fire: 610 rounds/min
- Muzzle velocity: 2,690 ft/s (820 m/s)
- Feed system: Belt
- Sights: Iron sights

The T24 machine gun was a prototype reverse engineered copy of the German MG 42 general-purpose machine gun developed during World War II as a possible replacement for the Browning Automatic Rifle and M1919A4 for infantry squads. The T24 was chambered for the .30-06 Springfield cartridge.

== Background ==
During World War II, German weapons designers adopted a philosophy of making guns which could be more efficiently manufactured, the MG 42 being a prime example.

When US soldiers first saw the MG 42, it was ridiculed for its use of stamped steel parts until it was realized how much quicker and more cheaply guns of this type could be manufactured. By February 1943, US ordnance authorities published the first report on the MG 42, following testing of a captured gun. The quick barrel changing and belt-feed systems were considered some of its best design features. The US Army wanted to be able to manufacture this general-purpose machine gun as it was lighter and simpler to make than other US light and medium machine guns, and it was decided to convert several MG 42s to fire .30-06 Springfield M2 ball ammunition. The MG 42 fired 7.92×57mm Mauser ammunition and had according to the German Einheitsmaschinengewehr (Universal machine gun) doctrine, a high cyclic rate of fire of 1,200 to 1,500 rounds per minute.

== Development ==
The Saginaw Steering Gear division of General Motors received a contract to construct two working converted MG 42 prototypes designated as the T24 machine gun. It could also be used on an M2 Tripod. The gun was made as an almost exact copy of the MG 42 which was chambered in 7.92×57mm Mauser. Some engineering changes were to use a barrel chambered for the .30-06 Springfield service round and an increased weight 47 oz (1,332 g) bolt in an effort to reduce the cyclic rate consistent with US rate requirements. The cyclic rate of the MG 42 design can be altered by installing different bolts and recoil springs. A heavier bolt uses more recoil energy to overcome inertia, thus slowing the cyclic rate of the action. The heavy bolt was used along with a stiffer return spring. The original MG 42 guns Saginaw Steering Gear reversed engineered their T24 prototypes from had a significantly lighter 17.8 oz (505 g) bolt. Saginaw Steering Gear did not dimensionally adjust the prototypes for the dimensionally 6.35 mm (0.25 in) longer .30-06 Springfield (7.62×63mm) cartridge case. The German 7.92×57mm Mauser s.S. Patrone and S.m.E. service rounds were about as powerful with a heavier and larger diameter bullet when compared to the American Cartridge, caliber .30, ball, M2, so the suggestion that Saginaw Steering Gear abandoned the project because .30-06 Springfield ammunition is more powerful is untrue.

When one of the two T24 machine gun prototypes was fired at Aberdeen Proving Ground, it fired only one shot and failed to eject the cartridge. A second attempt had the same result. The other prototype was plagued with excessive ejection failures and to a lesser extent failures to feed. The average cyclic rate of fire of the tested weapon was 614 rounds per minute. During January to February 1944 Aberdeen Proving Ground tests unsatisfactory functioning led to substitutions and changes of various parts in an effort to place the weapon in a position to continue the test, but all efforts failed. Firings were discontinued in February 1944 after 51 malfunctions and firing a total of 1,583 rounds by authorization of Major C. Balleisen, O.C.O. when it became evident the weapon required further development. In March 1944 the US military concluded that functioning of the T24 machine gun prototype was unsatisfactory and recommended that further development was required before this weapon be subjected to the lengthy and severe standard light machine gun test. However, the realization that the .30-06 Springfield cartridge was too long for the prototype gun's mechanism to easily and reliably work with resulted in the discarding of the project. Saginaw Steering Gear did not get the opportunity to correct the flaws that caused the inability to obtain reliable uninterrupted automatic functioning and further optimize and ready the weapon for mass production before World War II ended.

== See also ==
- MG 51
- CETME Ameli, Spanish GPMG
- MG 3, modern successor of the MG 42
- SIG 710-3, Swiss GPMG derived from the MG 42
