= Besal =

- Type: Light machine gun
- Place of origin: United Kingdom

Service history
- Used by: standby design
- Wars: World War II

Production history
- Designer: H. Faulkner
- Designed: 1940

Specifications
- Cartridge: .303 British
- Calibre: .303 in (7.7 mm)
- Action: Gas-operated
- Rate of fire: 600 rpm
- Feed system: 30-round Bren-compatible magazines
- Sights: Iron sights

The Besal, properly named "Gun, Light, Machine, Faulkner, .303-inch", was a light machine gun of British origin. The weapon was intended as an alternative to the Bren gun as it was lighter, simpler, cheaper and easier to manufacture and therefore was not dependent on the Royal Small Arms Factory, Enfield which was within range of German bombers. As the threat to the supply of Brens receded, it was eventually deemed unnecessary and never went into mass production.

The design was by Harry Faulkner of the Birmingham Small Arms Company, which also manufactured the larger Besa machine gun which like the Bren was a product of the pre-war Czech arms manufacturer. That weapon's name was a nickname for Birmingham Small Arms (BSA, who were awarded the contract to manufacture a prototype) and the Besal was to be a lighter version; a Besa-light. This was however not an official designation.
