= Toyokawa Naval Arsenal =

Production facility for the Imperial Japanese Navy during World War II

Coordinates: 34.834°N 137.373°E

The Toyokawa Naval Arsenal (豊川海軍工廠, Toyokawa kaigun kōshō) was a major production facility for aviation ordnance, light arms, and ammunitions for the Imperial Japanese Navy during World War II. It was located in what is now part of the city of Toyokawa, Aichi Prefecture, Japan. It was one of the largest armaments plant in the Empire of Japan, but was not bombed by Allied forces until after the bombing of Hiroshima in World War II.

== History ==
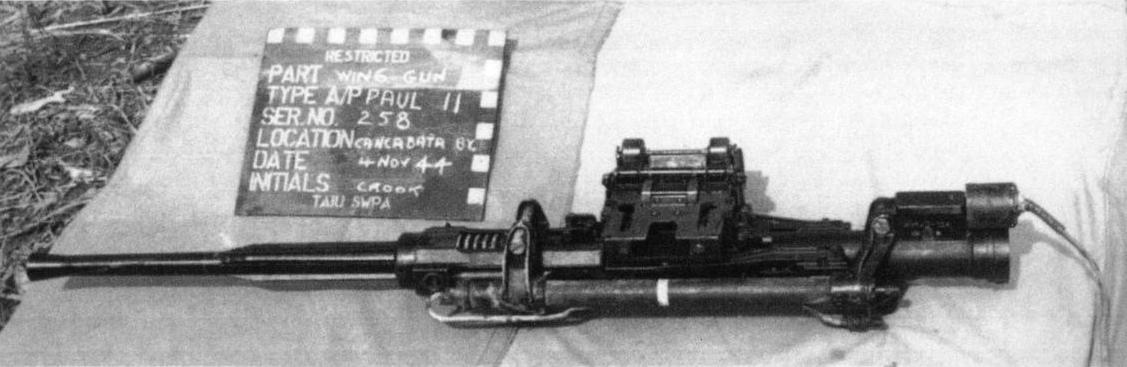
A Type 99 aircraft cannon captured by Allied forces

Plans to establish the Toyokawa Navy Arsenal were made in March 1937, along with the Suzuka Naval Arsenal in Mie Prefecture initially for the purpose of supplying 13 mm and 20 mm auto-cannons for the rapidly expanding Imperial Japanese Navy Air Service. The land was acquired in the towns of Toyokawa and Uchikubo and village of Yawata in eastern Aichi Prefecture by July 1938, and construction began on October 1, 1938. The formal opening ceremony for the new facility was held on December 15, 1939. The new plant initially covered 200 hectares, and had 1500 employees.

However, as the Second Sino-Japanese War quickly evolved into World War II, the demand for arms and ammunition increased. The Toyokawa Naval Arsenal expanded its facilities to 330 hectares in 1940. The northern 60 percent was devoted to the production of gunpowder and ammunition, and the southern 40 percent of the area was devoted to machining and assembly work, especially for the Type 92 7.7 mm aircraft gun and the Type 99 20mm aircraft cannon. In addition to aircraft weapons, the Toyokawa Navy Arsenal also produced optical equipment such as rangefinders and binoculars.

By February 1945, the plant employed 56,400 workers, including over 6000 school children who had been conscripted into working at the plant by the Japanese military. The plant also included its own water and gas facilities and dormitories for workers.

Despite its obvious military significance, the Toyokawa Navy Arsenal was not bombed until the very last stages of World War II. On the morning of 7 August 1945, 135 B-29 Superfortress bombers of the USAAF 20th Air Force, 58th 73rd, 313th, and 314th Bombardment Wings launched from Guam, Saipan and Tinian. They were joined by 48 P-51 Mustang escort fighters deployed from Iwo Jima. Arriving over the target area at 10:13 AM, twelve B-29s bombed the Toyokawa Naval Arsenal, while the remaining bombers concentrated on Toyokawa’s civilian population center, and the P-51s strafed targets of opportunity. A total of 3,256 500-lb bombs (813 tons) was dropped on city from an altitude of 15,000 – 17,000 feet. Civilian casualties estimates range from 2,544 to 2,677 people killed, including several hundred women and 452 schoolchildren, who had been conscripted to work at the Toyokawa Navy Arsenal by the Japanese military.

After World War II, the site of the former Toyokawa Navy Arsenal was developed into a large industrial complex, with a small portion given over to the JGSDF Camp Toyokawa. A large railway carriage factory operated by the Japan National Railway (JNR) is currently operated by Nippon Sharyo, and several other industries also operate on the site.

== See also ==
- Bombing of Toyokawa in World War II
