= Suzuka Naval Arsenal =

Imperial Japanese production facility

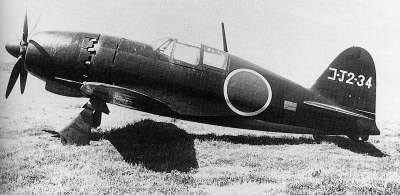
Mitsubishi J2M Raiden

The Suzuka Naval Arsenal (鈴鹿海軍工廠, Suzuka kaigun kōshō) was a production facility for aviation ordnance, light arms, and munitions for the Imperial Japanese Navy during World War II. It was located in the city of Suzuka, Mie Prefecture, Japan, and opened in June 1943.

The sixth prototype Mitsubishi J2M Raiden was tested at Suzuka in 1943, and the facility produced J2M2 Model 11 and J2M3 Model 21 aircraft.

== Armaments produced ==
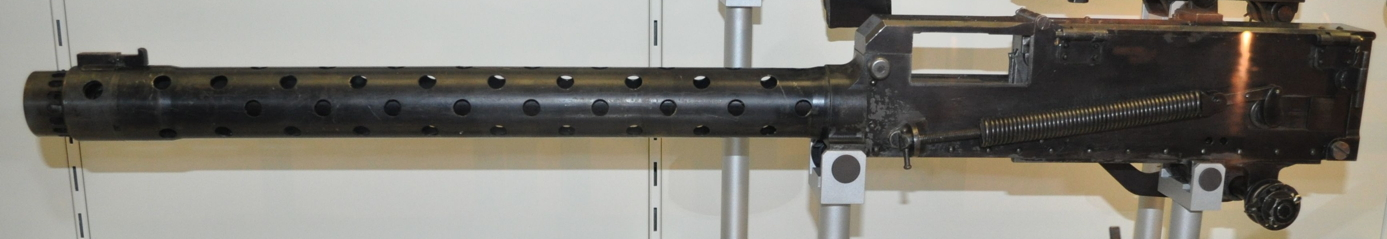
Type 97 7.7mm machine gun

=== Machine guns ===
- Navy Type 97 7.7 mm Fixed Machine Gun (License-built Vickers machine gun)
- Navy Type 2 13 mm Flexible Machine Gun (License-built MG 131)
- Navy Type 3 13 mm Flexible and Fixed Machine Guns (Copy of Browning machine gun)

=== Aircraft ===
- Mitsubishi J2M Raiden

== Legacy ==
Along with many other military sites, the former Suzuka Naval Arsenal has become an area visited by peace activists. The city of Suzuka is and was an industrial area, and the area around the arsenal was redeveloped into an industrial area. The main road to the Arsenal still exists, and is called "Navy Highway" 海軍道路 (Kaigun dōro). The overall Suzuka Naval Yard is one of the three areas in Mie Prefecture (all located in Suzuka) of the 47 total to be classified as Class A War Remains (A級の戦争遺跡) by the Agency for Cultural Affairs.
