= R37 =

R37 may refer to:

== Roads ==
- R37 expressway (Czech Republic)
- R37 (South Africa)

== Other uses ==
- R-37 (missile), a Russian air-to-air missile
- Renard R.37, a Belgian prototype fighter aircraft
- R37: Irritating to respiratory system, a risk phrase
