= Mitrailleuse d'Avion Browning - F.N. Calibre 13,2 mm =

Mitrailleuse d'Avion Browning - F.N. Calibre 13,2 mm 13.2 mm FN Browning
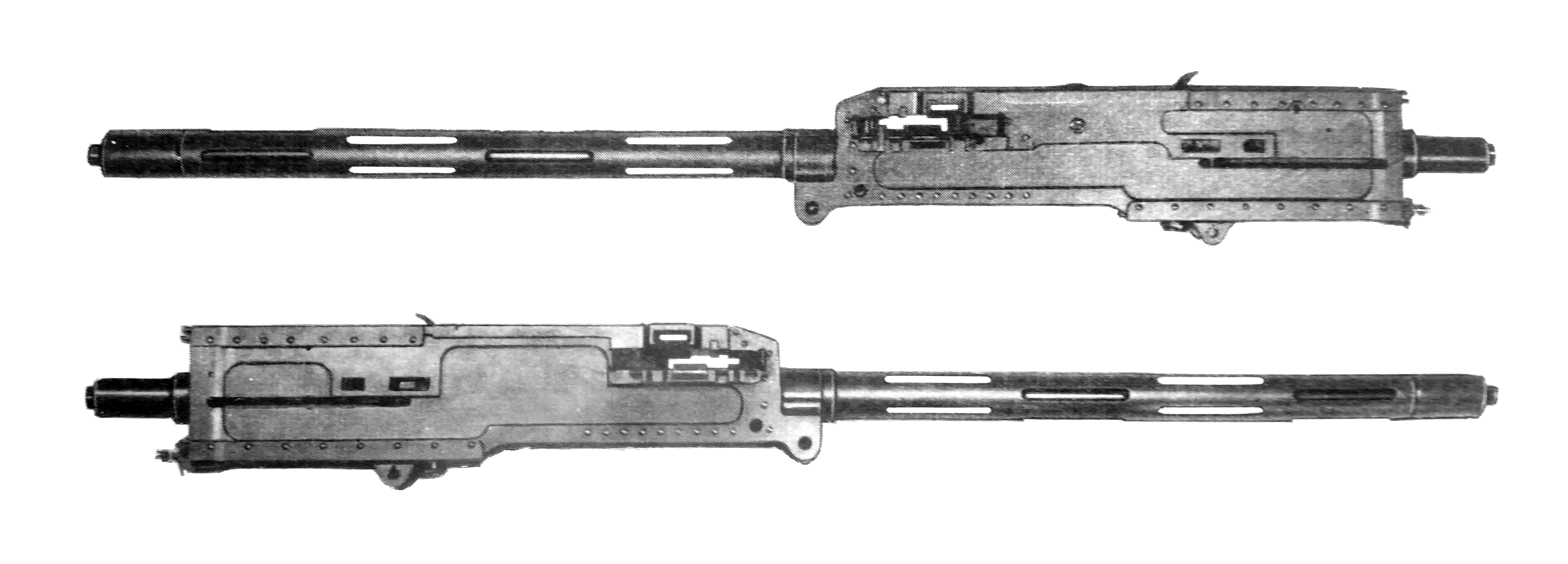
- Swedish 13.2 mm automatkanon m/39A
- Type: heavy machine gun/autocannon
- Place of origin: Belgium

Service history
- In service: 1939–1957 (Frontline with Swedish Air Force); 1951–2007: practice
- Used by: Sweden; Romania; Finland
- Wars: World War II

Production history
- Designed: 1938
- Manufacturer: FN Herstal; L. M. Ericsson
- Produced: 1939 – c. 1946
- Variants: See Variants

Specifications
- Mass: 24.3 kg (54 lb)
- Length: 1,415 mm (55.7 in) (1,450 mm (57 in) with flash hider)
- Barrel length: 816.5 mm (32.15 in) excluding flash hider
- Cartridge: 13.2×99mm Hotchkiss; 12.7×99mm Browning
- Cartridge weight: 120 g (0.26 lb) (13.2 x 99 Hotchkiss)
- Caliber: 13.2 mm (0.52 in); 12.7 mm (0.50 in)
- Action: Short-recoil operated, electrical solenoid fired
- Rate of fire: 1 080 rpm (standard) (600 - 1,500 rpm range)
- Muzzle velocity: 810–900 m/s (2,700–3,000 ft/s) - 13.2 x 99 Hotchkiss
- Effective firing range: Tracer to 1,000 m (1,100 yd)
- Maximum firing range: about 7,000 m (7,700 yd)
- Feed system: Belt fed
- Sights: Reflexsikte m/37 (Saab 18 & 21); Reflexsikte m/42B (FFVS J 22); Gyroreflexsikte K-14 (Saab 21A-3)

Mitrailleuse d'Avion Browning - F.N. Calibre 13,2 mm (in English Browning Aircraft Machine Gun - F.N. Caliber 13.2 mm) more commonly known as the "13.2 mm FN Browning", but also 13.2 mm Browning-F.N., F.N. Caliber 13.2 mm, FN Browning M.1939 and similar, was a 13.2 mm (0.52 in) caliber, shell-firing, heavy machine gun for aircraft use, designed by Fabrique Nationale (FN) in Herstal, Belgium, as a private export venture during the final years prior to World War II.

Even though it gained great interest during its limited time on the export market, it was only exported to the air forces of Romania and Sweden prior to the German invasion of Belgium in 1940, although later in the war Finland commenced unlicensed production with help from Sweden.

== Development and description ==
The 13.2 mm FN Browning was developed by FN as an improved version of the .50 in (12.7 mm) air-cooled Browning MG53 aircraft machine gun. Improvements to the original design included: making the weapon lighter, increasing the rate of fire and offering it in not just 12.7×99mm Browning, but also 13.2×99mm Hotchkiss, the latter cartridge effectively being a 12.7×99mm Browning cartridge but with a caliber of 13.2 mm (0.52 in). The 13.2×99mm Hotchkiss cartridge was the initial cartridge developed for the 13.2 mm Hotchkiss machine gun, being replaced by the 13.2×96mm Hotchkiss cartridge in 1935, and was thus used and produced by a wide variety of countries in Europe. To further improve on the design, FN developed a high-explosive shell against air targets for the 13.2×99mm Hotchkiss cartridge, purpose built for the 13.2 mm FN Browning.

In modern nomenclature, the weapon largely fits the definition of a heavy machine gun, as per its M2 basis, however, in period texts, the weapon is referred to as a "shell firing gun". This refers to the high-explosive munition offered for the system by FN Herstal. In Swedish service, it was designated as an "autocannon" (automatkanon), as the Swedish air force caliber range for cannons starts at 12.7 mm.

=== Interest & export ===
Due to the above-mentioned features, the 13.2 mm FN Browning drew a lot of interest from a number of nations when it entered the export market in 1939. Some interested countries of note were: the Finnish Air Force, the Royal Romanian Air Force, the Swedish Air Force, the Royal Netherlands Army Aviation Brigade and the Royal Belgian Military Aviation . The Dutch planned to use the 13.2 mm FN Browning in their in-development Fokker D.XXIII fighter aircraft, while the Belgians had plans on using it in their in-development Renard R.36 fighter aircraft and its subsequent variants: R.37, R.38 and R.42. However with the start of WW2, and the subsequent invasion and occupation of Belgium by Nazi Germany in the summer of 1940, the 13.2 mm FN Browning was, in that limited time, only exported to Romania and Sweden.

== Users ==
=== Romania ===
The few weapons that were sold to Romania were at first used on their SM.79 bombers but later saw use on their own indigenous IAR 80B fighter plane. In Romania the weapons saw combat and were considered equal to the 20 mm weapons used in the Romanian air force such as the German MG 151/20.

=== Sweden ===
Sweden gained interest in the 13.2 mm FN Browning in 1938 and ordered it from FN in 1939, as well as a license to produce the weapon in Sweden. The order was ready for delivery by the summer of 1940, just prior to the German invasion of Belgium. Delivery of the guns, munition and documentation was initially meant to be sent by train to Sweden, but due to the German invasion the delivery had to be rushed by way of ship. In Sweden the Belgian produced weapons received the designation 13,2 mm automatkanon m/39, abbreviated as 13,2 mm akan m/39, meaning "13.2 mm autocannon m/39". Swedish license production of the 13.2 mm FN Browning was handled by LM Ericsson (LME) and production took place in a basement complex in central Stockholm. Due to insufficient documentation and construction quality, a number of changes had to be made to the weapon design for Swedish production to begin, leading to a new variant being produced. The Swedish produced variant therefore got the designation 13,2 mm automatkanon m/39A (13,2 mm akan m/39A). In Sweden the 13,2 mm akan m/39 became their main aircraft weapon of WWII, playing a similar role the .50 in (12.7 mm) AN-M2 Browning did for the Americans during World War II where most all warplanes had it as their main armament. While the weapon never saw combat in the Swedish Air Force, it remained in use for an extended period.

After the war it became apparent that 13.2×99mm ammunition would be too expensive to come by and with the purchase of surplus North American P-51D Mustangs (in Sweden designated J 26) armed with 12.7×99mm AN-M2 Browning guns in 1945, it was decided in 1947 to re-chamber the 13.2 mm akan m/39 guns for the readily available 12.7×99mm Browning cartridge. Conversion to the new cartridge only required a barrel swap due to the similarities between the 13.2×99mm and 12.7×99mm cartridges, and both types of barrels (12.7 mm and 13.2 mm) were available simultaneously for a few years to allow the existing 13.2 mm stock to be used up in live fire exercise. The 13.2 mm cartridge was written off from manuals around 1950. Even though the 12.7 mm cartridge was considered a downgrade from the 13.2 mm cartridge with its high-explosive ammunition, it did not matter, as Sweden's main fighter fleet by then had been upgraded to de Havilland Vampire fighter planes armed with 20 mm cannon. The last frontline military aircraft to use the 12.7 mm akan m/39s was the SAAB T 18B coastal attacker aircraft which left service in 1959.

From the early 1950s onward however, the 12 mm akan m/39 started being used as a training weapon for jet fighters, such as the de Havilland J 28 Vampire and the SAAB J 29 Tunnan, where it could be mounted in place of the main cannon armament by the use of a small add-on. This use continued all the way to the early 2000s when its last training carrier, the Saab 37 Viggen, left service in 2007.

=== Finland ===
Finland never formally got the chance to buy the Belgian design before the invasion of Belgium, however through their connections with Sweden they managed to get hold of the manufacturing blueprints for the weapon which allowed them to produce it in Finland. Since Finland already was producing 12.7×99mm Browning ammunition it was decided to produce the weapon chambered for that cartridge. The Finnish variant was produced by the Finnish State Rifle Factory Valtion Kivääritehdas (VKT) and received the designation 12,70 mm LentoKoneKivääri m/42, abbreviated as 12,70 LKk/42, meaning "12.70 mm aircraft machine gun m/42".

In Finland the weapon was used to rearm many of Finland's fighter aircraft as many of them were older pre-war designs armed with weak or unreliable weapons. The LKk/42 guns were mainly fitted to Finnish Curtiss 75 Hawk and Brewster B-239 Buffalo, but also to the indigenous Finnish VL Myrsky fighter aircraft. The weapon was also planned to be used on the VL Humu and VL Pyörremyrsky fighter aircraft if they were to enter production. It was occasionally fitted as a field modification, such as on Finnish Arado 196s, to increase firepower.

After WWII the Finnish used the 12,70 LKk/42 as training weaponry in aircraft such as the Saab 35 Draken and BAE Hawk.

== Variants ==
- Mitrailleuse d'Avion Browning - F.N. Calibre 13,2 mm (13,2 mm Browning-F.N.) – Original weapons built in Belgium by Fabrique Nationale Herstal (FN) in 13.2×99mm Hotchkiss
- 13,2 mm automatkanon m/39 (13,2 mm akan m/39) – Swedish designation for weapons produced in Belgium by Fabrique Nationale Herstal (FN) in 13.2×99mm Hotchkiss
- 13,2 mm automatkanon m/39A (13,2 mm akan m/39A) – Swedish designation for weapons license produced in Sweden by LM Ericsson in 13.2×99mm Hotchkiss
- 12,7 mm automatkanon m/39 (12,7 mm akan m/39) – Swedish designation for weapons produced in Belgium by FN Herstal, re-chambered for 12.7×99mm Browning (.50 BMG)
- 12,7 mm automatkanon m/39A (12,7 mm akan m/39A) – Swedish designation for weapons license produced in Sweden by LM Ericsson, re-chambered for 12.7×99mm Browning
- 12,70 mm LentoKoneKivääri m/42 (12,70 LKk/42) – Finnish designation for unlicenced production in Finland by Valtion Kivääritehdas (VKT) in 12.7×99mm Browning
