= R36 =

R36 or R-36 may refer to:

== Roads ==
- R36 road (Belgium)
- R36 (South Africa)

== Other uses ==
- R36 (airship), a British airship
- R-36 (missile), a family of Soviet intercontinental ballistic missiles
- R36 (New York City Subway car)
- HMS Chieftain (R36), a destroyer of the Royal Navy
- R36: Irritating to eyes, a risk phrase
- Renard R.36, a Belgian fighter aircraft
- Volkswagen Passat R36, a car
