= 13.2×99mm Hotchkiss Long =

Heavy machine gun cartridge

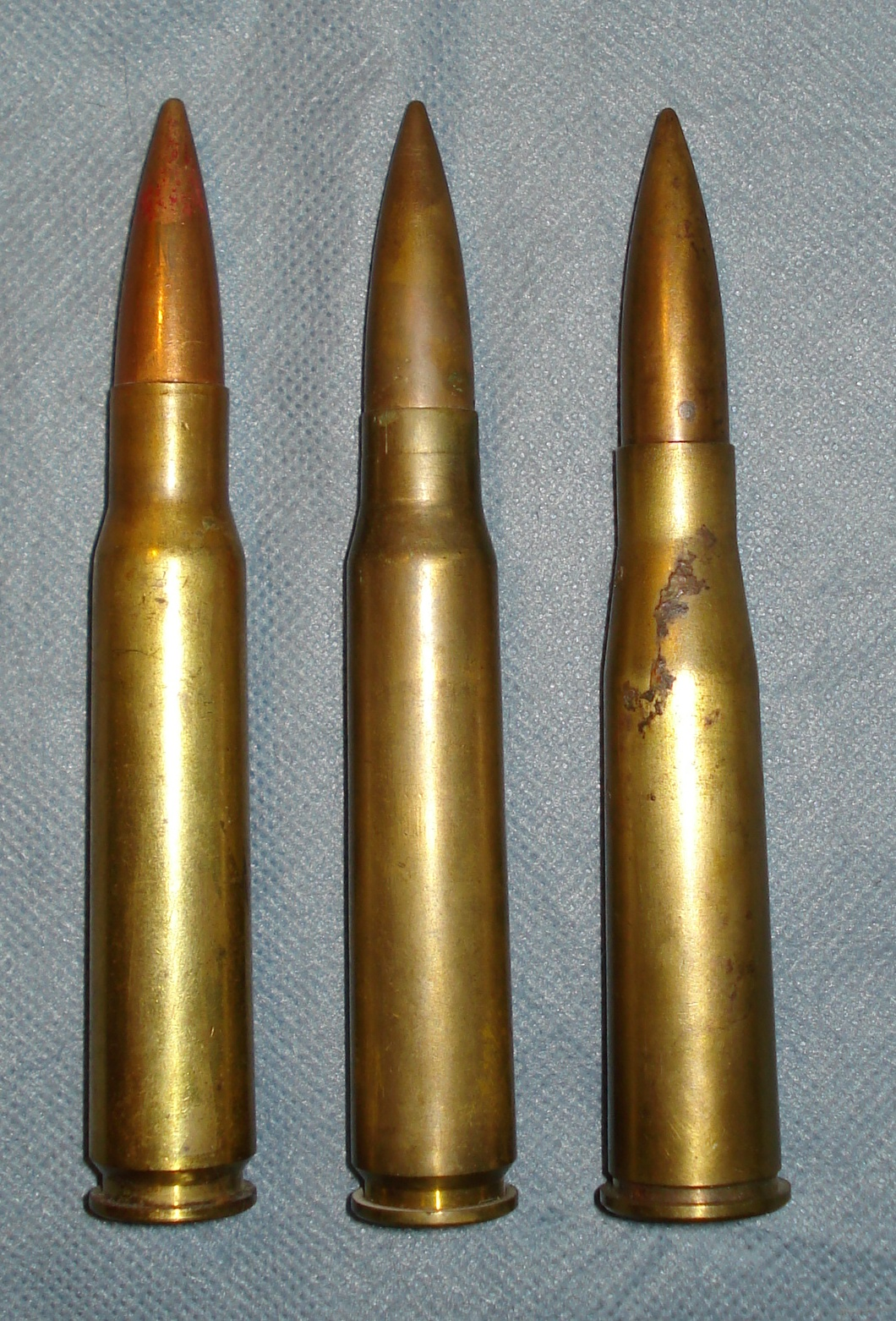
- From left: 13.2 × 99 mm Hotchkiss Long, 13.2 × 96 mm Hotchkiss Short, 13.2 × 92 mm SR Mauser
- Type: Machine gun cartridge
- Place of origin: France

Service history
- In service: 1926–1949
- Used by: See Users
- Wars: World War II

Production history
- Designer: Hotchkiss et Cie / Société Française des Munitions
- Designed: 1925
- Variants: 13.2×96mm Hotchkiss Short

Specifications
- Bullet diameter: 13.5 mm (0.53 in)
- Neck diameter: 14.48 mm (0.570 in)
- Shoulder diameter: 18.5 mm (0.73 in)
- Base diameter: 20.2 mm (0.80 in)
- Rim diameter: 20.3 mm (0.80 in)
- Rim thickness: 2 mm (0.079 in)
- Case length: 99.2 mm (3.91 in)
- Overall length: 136.6 mm (5.38 in)

Ballistic performance
Bullet mass/type	Velocity	Energy
52 g (802 gr) solid	790 m/s (2,600 ft/s)	16,319 J (12,036 ft⋅lbf)

The 13.2 × 99 mm Hotchkiss Long (also known as: 13.2 Mle. 1930, 13.2 Breda, 13.2 Japanese, etc), is a heavy machine gun cartridge developed by France during the interwar period for the Hotchkiss 13.2 mm machine gun. It saw major use as a heavy machine gun cartridge from the 1930s throughout WWII by a variety of nations due to the export success of the 13.2 mm Hotchkiss machine gun, but was eventually superseded in popularity by the 12.7 × 99 mm Browning (.50 BMG) after the war and eventually disappeared once the Browning cartridge became NATO standard.

== History ==
The 13.2 × 99 mm Hotchkiss cartridge was developed in 1925 by the company Hotchkiss et Cie and the French Society of Ammunition "Société Française des Munitions" (SFM) as part of a longer development period to produce a modern heavy machine gun cartridge for the in-development 13.2 mm Hotchkiss machine gun. By 1926 the new weapon entered production and quickly gained popularity. By 1935 the weapon and a license to produce it had been purchased by both Italy and Imperial Japan, becoming the Breda Model 1931 machine gun and Type 93 Heavy Machine Gun in each respective country.

Even though the cartridge saw massive success on the export market, the French military found it to wear out gun barrels too quickly and launched a project to revamp the cartridge. This eventually lead to Hotchkiss replacing the design with a slightly shortened version in 1935, becoming the 13.2 × 96 mm Hotchkiss "Short". This shortened version featured the same overall dimensions as the original cartridge but featured a slightly shortened neck and a reworked projectile shape, resulting in less wear on the gun barrel when firing. The introduction of this new design did not however stop continued use and production of the 13.2×99mm Hotchkiss "Long" cartridge by countries whom had already adopted it and in 1939 the cartridge saw new interest on the export market due to the newly developed 13.2 mm FN Browning aircraft machine gun, which was offered in both 12.7 × 99 mm Browning and 13.2 × 99 mm Hotchkiss "Long".

During WWII the 13.2 × 99 mm Hotchkiss cartridge saw major use in combat by both Allied and Axis forces, mainly being used in 13.2 mm Hotchkiss machine guns and its license produced derivatives. By the end of the war however the cartridge started being superseded by the very similar 12.7 × 99 mm Browning cartridge as used in the spreading American .50 M2 Browning heavy machine gun, eventually leading to the death of both 13.2 mm Hotchkiss cartridges post war.

== Cartridge types ==
Combat ammunition
Cartridge	Origin	Type		Source
Balle de service	France	Ball	Full metal jacket	
Balle perforante	France	AP	Armour-piercing	
Balle traçante	France	T	Tracer	
Balle perforante traçante	France	AP-T	Armour-piercing tracer	
Balle incendiaire	France	I	Incendiary	
Balle explosive traçante	Belgium	HEF-T	High-explosive fragmentation tracer	
13,2 mm granat m/44	Sweden	AP-HEI	Armour-piercing high-explosive incendiary	

== Users ==
- Chile
- France – Used in the Mitrailleuse de 13.2 mm CA mle 1930.
- Italy – Used in the Breda Model 1931 machine gun.
- Empire of Japan - Used in the Type 93 Heavy Machine Gun.
- Mexico
- Poland – Used in the 13.2 mm wz.30.
- Republic of China (1912–1949)
- Romania – Used in the 13.2 mm FN Browning.
- Sweden – Used in the 13,2 mm kulspruta M/It and 13,2 mm automatkanon m/39.

== Weapons in 13.2×99mm ==
- 13.2 mm Hotchkiss machine gun
- 13.2 mm Breda Model 1931 machine gun
- 13.2 mm Type 93 Heavy Machine Gun
- 13.2 mm Type 3 aircraft machine gun
- 13.2 mm FN Browning aircraft machine gun

== See also ==
- .50 BMG
- M2 Browning
- Mitrailleuse d'Avion Browning - F.N. Calibre 13,2 mm
