= Bofors 57 mm m/47 aircraft gun =

Swedish aircraft gun (1947–1958)

57 mm automatkanon m/47
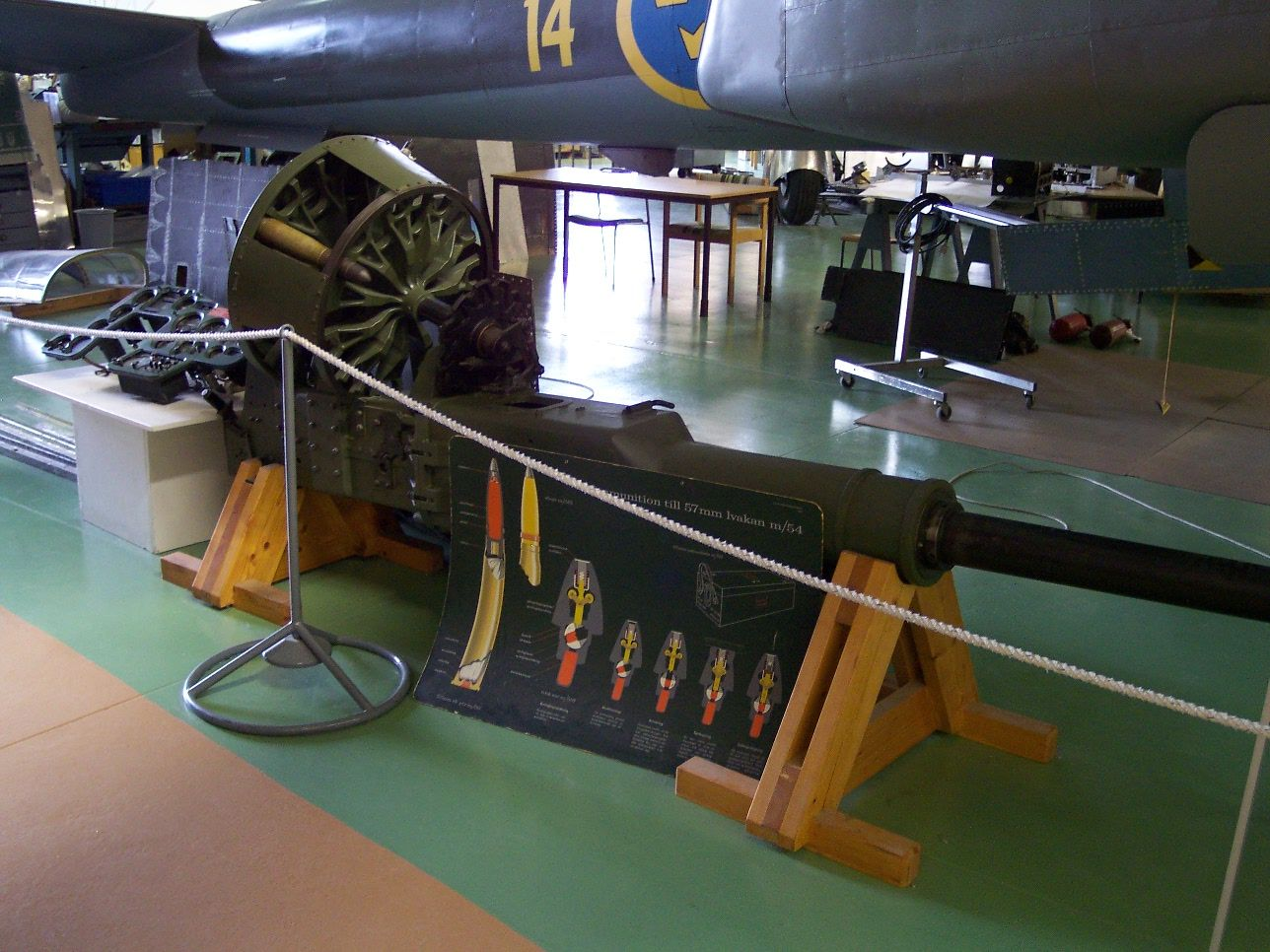
- A Bofors 57 mm m/47 aircraft gun in front of a B 18B at Flygvapenmuseum in Linköping Sweden.
- Type: airborne autocannon
- Place of origin: Sweden

Service history
- In service: 1947–1958
- Used by: Sweden

Production history
- Designer: Bofors AB
- Designed: 1945-1947
- Manufacturer: Bofors AB
- Produced: 1948-1950
- No. built: ca 62

Specifications
- Mass: 550 kg (1,210 lb) empty 735 kg (1,620 lb) fully loaded
- Barrel length: 2,850 mm (112.20 in)
- Shell: 57 mm × 230R mm 4 kg (8.8 lb) average round weight
- Caliber: 57 mm/50 caliber
- Barrels: Single barrel
- Rate of fire: 180 rounds/min
- Muzzle velocity: 686 m/s (2,250 ft/s) HE; 744 m/s (2,440 ft/s) AP
- Effective firing range: 2,000 m (2,200 yd)
- Maximum firing range: 10,000 m (11,000 yd)
- Feed system: 40 round drum magazine (41 with one in the chamber)
- Sights: Reflex sight or Gyro gunsight.

The Bofors 57 mm m/47 aircraft gun (Swedish: 57 mm automatkanon m/47, short 57 mm akan m/47) was a Swedish aircraft gun developed by Bofors AB for the T 18B, a Swedish torpedo bomber manufactured by SAAB. The designation "57 mm automatkanon m/47" is translated to "57 mm autocannon model 1947". It is referred to as the Bofors 57 mm type L50 by the manufacturer.

It was an effective and modern weapon for its time, and was capable of firing through a full magazine smoothly due to its reliable design and the use of a powerful muzzle brake. The recoil could be felt by the pilot, but this did not interfere with the pilot's aim, and the weapon was accurate up to 2,000 m (2,200 yd).

== History ==
Toward the end of the 1930s and into the early 1940s, the Swedish Air Force was looking for a new torpedo bomber, since they had not been able to acquire enough units of the previous model, the T 2. The Swedish Air Force then asked the Swedish airplane manufacturer Saab AB (formerly SAAB) to design a torpedo bomber based on their existing design, the Saab 18. SAAB accepted the request and commenced work on the design titled "T 18B" immediately after they received the requirements for the project.

However, the Swedish Air Force kept changing their specifications, and in February 1944 they informed SAAB that it might be necessary to equip the T 18B with a 57 mm autocannon as an alternative to its torpedo. Conveniently, Bofors had already been commissioned to develop such a gun for the Swedish Air Force, which resulted in the development of a 57 mm fully automatic recoilless rifle.

The weapon was ready for testing in June 1944 and was tested by mounting it in a Saab 18 that had crashed. The tests showed that the backblast caused by the weapon led to so much damage to the plane that it made the weapon impossible to use safely.

After their failure, Bofors offered to develop a new cannon that used conventional ammunition instead; this new weapon would be ready for testing in the autumn of 1947. Test firings on the ground had produced positive results, and the weapon was approved for service with the type designation m/45.

The T 18B had already been adopted by Swedish Air Force, not as a torpedo bomber, but instead as a conventional bomb and attack aircraft. During the prototype phase of the T 18B, it was shown that the T 18B was too fast to work as a torpedo bomber; so the 57 mm was the perfect replacement for the torpedo.

In January 1948, the Swedish Air Force section F 17 conducted extensive tests with the new gun in Kiruna. The new gun was then installed in the T 18B. In the air the 57 mm m/47 performed well as it had very little spread, with the heavy muzzle brake absorbing all the recoil. This made it possible to fire a full magazine in one go. Thanks to this, the stability of the plane was barely affected, which made the plane very easy to keep the line of sight. In addition to good combat performance, the weapon was very easy to install, as it could be installed on the plane in less than 3 hours.

In service, the weapon proved problematic to train with, as its high rate of fire and high damage destroyed practice targets too quickly. This meant that during larger exercises the last aircraft in line to shoot didn't have anything to shoot at. Even when the fleet used obsolete armored boats as practice targets, they did not last long against the new m/45.

== Ammunition ==
- 57 mm sk ptr m/47 pprj m/47 (Armor-piercing shell) Color: Black
- 57 mm sk ptr m/47 sgr m/47 (High-explosive shell) Color: Grey with yellow stripe
- 57 mm sk ptr m/47 övnprj m/47 (Training-shell) Color: Brown

Beyond the above-mentioned munitions the gun also acquired newer ammunition with time such as mine shells.

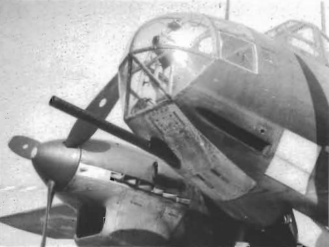
T 18B with 57 mm akan m/47.

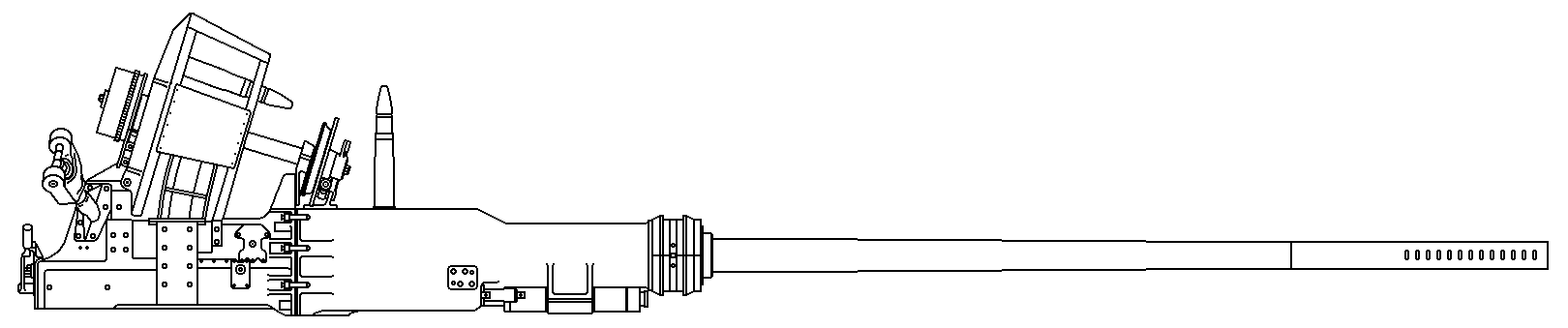
Blueprint of the Bofors 57 mm m/47 aircraft gun.
