= Type 93 heavy machine gun =

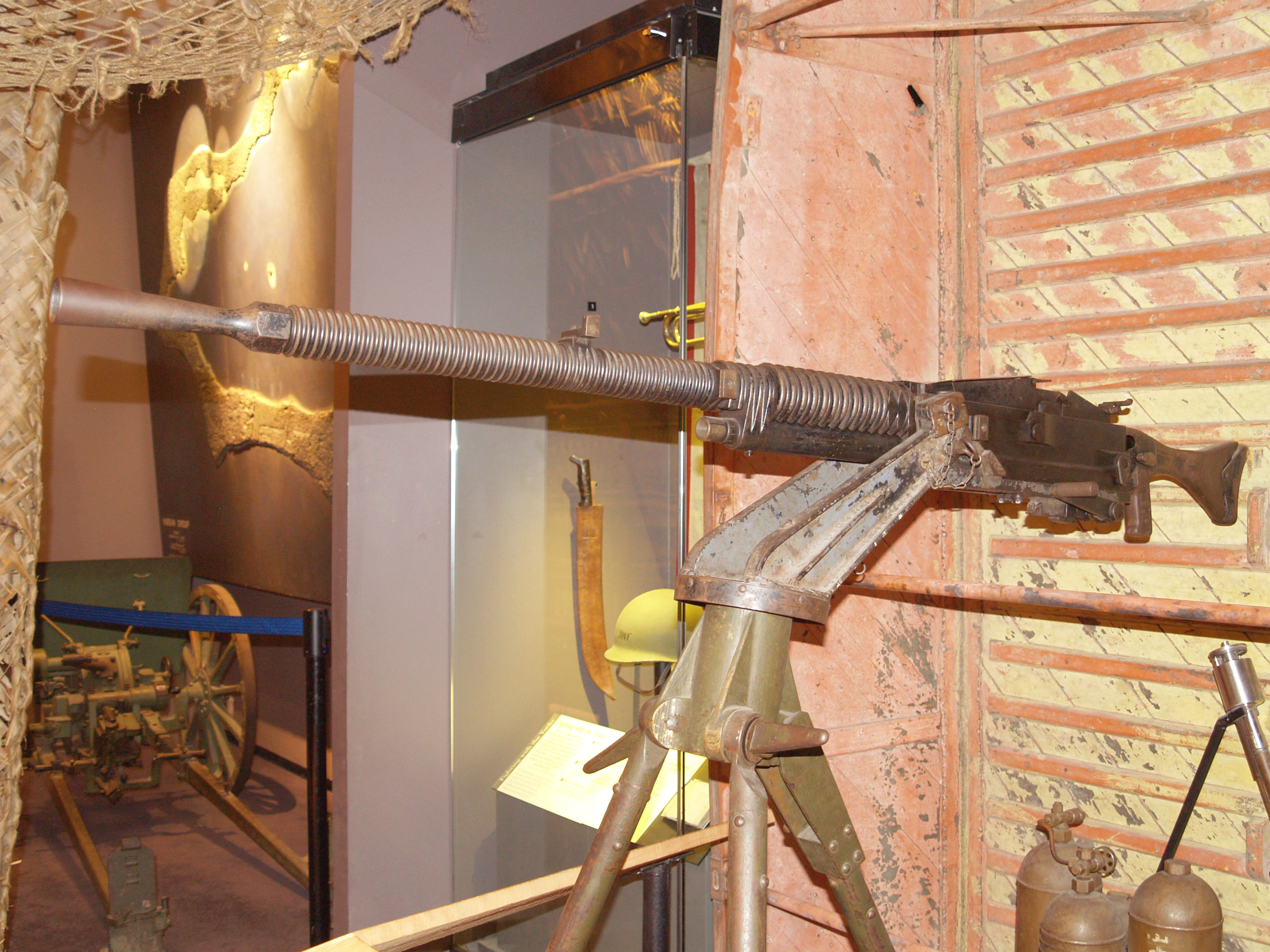
- A tripod-mounted single Type 93 HMG on display at the Auckland Museum
- Type: Heavy machine gun, anti-aircraft cannon
- Place of origin: Empire of Japan

Service history
- In service: 1935–1945 (Japan)
- Used by: Imperial Japanese Army Imperial Japanese Navy Indonesian National Armed Forces People’s Volunteer Army/People’s Liberation Army National Revolutionary Army/Republic of China Army (possible) Korean People’s Army (possible)
- Wars: Second Sino-Japanese War; World War II; Indonesian National Revolution; Chinese Civil War (possible); Korean War

Production history
- Designed: 1933
- Manufacturer: Yokosuka Naval Yard
- Produced: 1935–1945
- No. built: 1,495+ available late war

Specifications
- Mass: 42 kilograms (93 lb) (empty)
- Length: 140 centimeters (55 in)
- Barrel length: 988 millimeters (38.9 in)
- Shell: 13.2×99mm Hotchkiss
- Caliber: 13.2 mm
- Action: Gas-operated fully automatic
- Elevation: -15 / +85°
- Traverse: 360°
- Rate of fire: 450 rounds/min
- Effective firing range: 1,000 meters (3,300 ft) (against aircraft)
- Sights: Spiderweb anti-aircraft iron sight

The Type 93 13 mm heavy machine gun (Japanese: 九三式十三粍機銃 Kyū-san Shiki Jū-san Mirimētoru Kijū), known to the Imperial Japanese Army as the Type Ho 13 mm AA machine cannon (Japanese: ホ式十三粍高射機関砲 Ho Shiki Jū-san Mirimētoru Kōsha Kikanhō), was a license-built version of the Hotchkiss M1930 machine gun used by the Empire of Japan during the Second Sino-Japanese War and World War II.

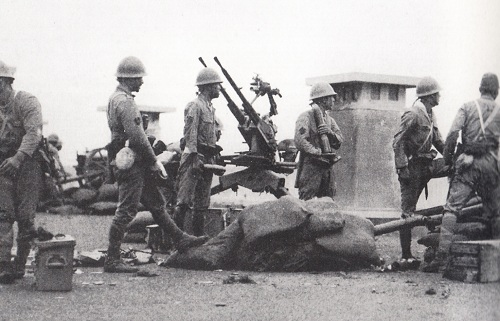
Members of the Imperial Japanese Navy operating various artillery, circa 1939. A Type 93 dual-mount is visible in the background.

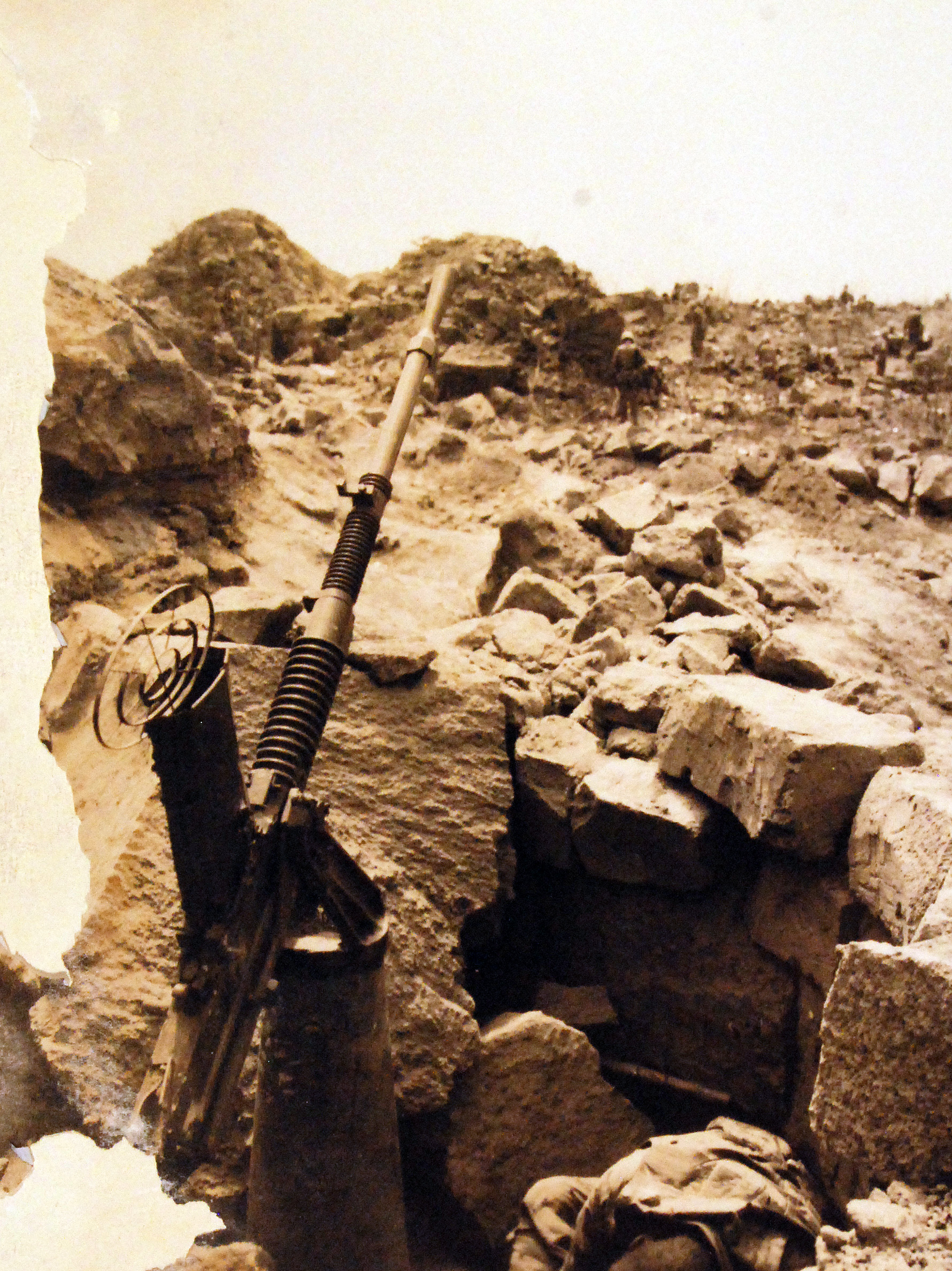
A Type 93 mounted on a pedestal emplacement on Iwo Jima, 1945.
