= Saab 18 =

Swedish bomber and reconnaissance aircraft

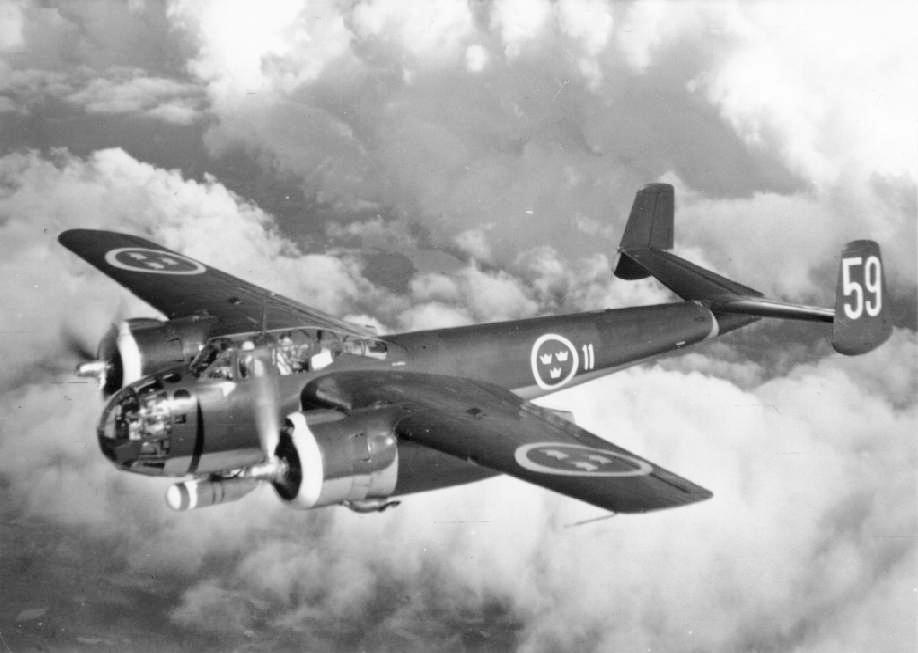
- A Swedish Air Force S 18A flies with the F 11 Wing over Sweden, c. 1946

General information
- Type: Bomber, reconnaissance
- National origin: Sweden
- Manufacturer: SAAB
- Status: Retired
- Primary user: Swedish Air Force (historical)
- Number built: 245

History
- Manufactured: 1944–1948
- Introduction date: 1944
- First flight: 19 June 1942
- Retired: 1959 (Sweden)

The Saab 18 was a twin-engine bomber and reconnaissance aircraft, designed and built by Svenska Aeroplan AB (SAAB) for use by the Swedish Air Force in response to a 1938 design competition. Due to delays, it did not enter service until 1944, but quickly became the standard Swedish bomber aircraft. Serving in the bomber, reconnaissance and ground-attack roles, it also assisted in the development of ejection seats and air-to-surface guided missiles until its replacement by the Saab Lansen in the late 1950s.

== Design and development ==
Intended as a replacement for the Junkers Ju 86 in service with the Swedish Air Force, the requirement that led to the Saab 18 called for a three-seat fast reconnaissance aircraft.

AB Svenska Järnvägsverkstädernas Aeroplanavdelning (ASJA), SAAB, and AB Götaverken (GV) submitted designs for consideration by the Swedish Air Force. GV's GV8 appeared to be the best suited to the requirement; however, its cost and the departure of their chief designer resulted in SAAB — the company having merged with ASJA in the meantime — being awarded a contract for development of their design.

As a number of Americans were on the design staff of SAAB and ASJA, the Saab 18's design shared some similarities with American designs. The outbreak of World War II in 1939 led to a change of priorities by the Swedish Air Force, and production of the Saab 17 was accelerated, at the expense of work on the Saab 18, which, along with a change of requirements that added the role of medium bomber to the specification, resulted in the first flight of the aircraft being delayed until 19 June 1942.

Manned by a crew of three — a pilot and navigator under a glazed, offset canopy, and a bombardier in the nose — the Saab 18 prototype was a mid-wing monoplane with twin vertical stabilisers, and was powered by two Pratt & Whitney R-1830 Twin Wasp radial engines. Armament consisted of three 13.2-millimetre (0.52 in) machine guns, one fixed firing forwards and controlled by the pilot, the others being in flexible defensive mounts for use by the navigator and bombardier. Up to 1,000 kilograms (2,200 lb) of bombs could be carried in an internal bay, while up to eight 50-kilogram (110 lb) bombs could be carried on underwing hardpoints.

Flight testing showed that the aircraft was underpowered. However, as there was no immediate prospect for the acquisition of more powerful engines, the Saab 18 was ordered into production in both bomber (B 18A) and reconnaissance (S 18A) versions.

== Operational history ==
The B 18A entered service in June 1944, and quickly became Sweden's standard medium bomber aircraft. As license-built Daimler-Benz DB 605 liquid-cooled, V-12 engines had become available, they were incorporated into the improved Saab 18B, which first flew on 10 July 1944.

Ordered into production as the B 18B dive bomber, the 18B design was further developed into the T 18B, which was planned to be a torpedo bomber variant. Due to difficulties with the torpedoes, however, the T 18B was instead developed into a heavy ground-attack aircraft, mounting a 57-millimetre (2.2 in) automatkanon m/47 autocannon under the nose.

By the late 1940s, the third crewmember's position had been eliminated, reducing the crew of the aircraft to two; the provision of air-to-ground rockets and improved bombsights had removed the requirement for a bombardier. By this time the Saab 18 had established a reputation for suffering a serious attrition rate, leading to the decision to outfit all surviving aircraft with ejection seats for the pilot and navigator/gunner.

Production of the Saab 18 totaled 245 examples, with the last T 18B being delivered in 1948. Used in trials of early Swedish air-to-surface missiles, the Saab 18 remained one of Sweden's frontline ground attack and reconnaissance platforms until the late 1950s, when it was replaced by the jet-powered, swept wing Saab 32 Lansen, the B 18B and T 18B being replaced by the A 32A in 1958, with the last S 18As being replaced by S 32Cs in 1959.

== Variants ==
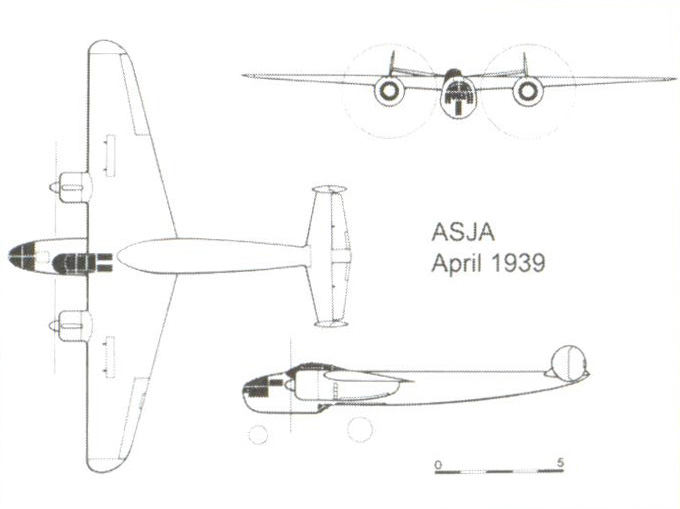
3-side view of the ASJA L 11

Saab 18
One SFA STWC-3 engined B 18A prototype. The same prototype was later re-engined with SFA DB 605B engines as the prototype for the B 18B.

B 18A
The first production version, bomber aircraft powered by two SFA STWC-3 Twin Wasp radial piston engines and armed with three 13.2 mm akan m/39A autocannons, one fixed, two movable for defence. 62 built. The B 18A was quickly into its service life equipped with bomb forks to be able to dive bomb. All were converted into S 18A reconnaissance planes in 1946-47.

S 18A
Photo-reconnaissance conversion of B 18A, fitted with PS-18/A radar among other modifications.

B 18B
Dive bomber version, powered by two Daimler-Benz DB 605B piston engines. It was at the start armed with the same 3 autocannons as the B 18A but it was quickly downgraded to 2 due to the lower defensive one being borderline useless due its limited traverse and the limited view for the gunner. In 1946 the Swedish rocket-development program started and the B 18B was one of the planes used to test rockets of different types. In 1949-1950 all planes were redesignated as attack aircraft and got the ability to equip 12 light rockets or 8 light rockets and 2 heavy rockets. During the same period they also got ejection seats for the pilot and radio operator. Due to this the bombardier had to be removed and the radio operator lost his defensive gun. The defensive gun had become obsolete either way due to the jet era. Many of the planes that received ejection seats were also modified with a new rounded windshield. Very late into its service life it was used effectively as a reconnaissance plane where it mainly dropped flare bombs and got the same PS-18/A radar as the S 18A. 119 built.

T 18B
Attack version (originally projected as a torpedo-bomber), powered by the same engines as the B 18B. It was armed with the same fixed and upper defensive autocannon as the B 18B, but had 2 20 mm akan m/41 guns fixed in the nose. It had a bigger bomb bay originally designed for a torpedo, but the aircraft could equip a 1000 kg m/47 medium-capacity/general-purpose bomb or a 57 mm akan m/47 autocannon with 41 rounds instead, besides the original bomb loadouts of the B 18B. Early into its service it was also tested with the RB 302 anti-shipping missile which never entered service. In 1949 it received the same rocket and ejection seat upgrades as the B 18B, but could only carry 8 light rockets. In 1949 it was also tested with twin Bofors 40 mm L70's in place of its 57 mm but the recoil shattered the nose glass, ending the tests. 52 built.

B 18A Dubbelkommando
Trainer version where the radio operator seat was turned around for an instructor. The armored shield between the seats blocked the instructor's view, but the conversion was considered worth it in the end as no new trainers had to be purchased and the plane could easily be reconverted for combat duty.

B 18B Dubbelkommando
Same idea as mentioned above but implemented on the B 18B.

=== Planned variants and unused designations ===
- ASJA L 11 (P8A) - Early concept art by asja from April 1939. Had a nose wheel and no planned bomb mountings on the wings.
- S 18B - The S 18B was originally planned to be a reconnaissance plane due to the B 18A just entering service. Due to its excellent performance it was decided to switch the roles and make the B 18A the recon plane.
- A 18B - Unused designation for the B 18B when it became an official attacker.
- T 18 - Original plan for the T 18B. It was originally suggested to be built on the B 18A basis.
- T 18C - Original planned designation for the T 18B.
- T 18B-1 - Planned designation for T 18B's equipped for torpedo bombing.
- T 18B-2 - Planned designation for T 18B's equipped with the 57 mm.
- BJ 18B - Planned night fighter variant armed with a gunpod/tub with 4x 20 mm akan m/45 autocannons with 180rpg. It was also suggested to equip it with 2,000 hp (1,500 kW) Double Wasp engines or to run the DB 605B engines on 100 octane fuel to increase their power. The plan was never followed through due to the development of the T 18B taking priority.
- J 18C - Other suggested designation for the night fighter version.
- B 18R - Suggested jet variant equipped with STAL jet engines. The project came fairly far and an airframe was selected to be converted into the prototype in 1945. The plan was never followed through due to the development of the T 18B taking priority.

== Operators ==
Sweden

- Swedish Air Force

== Survivors ==
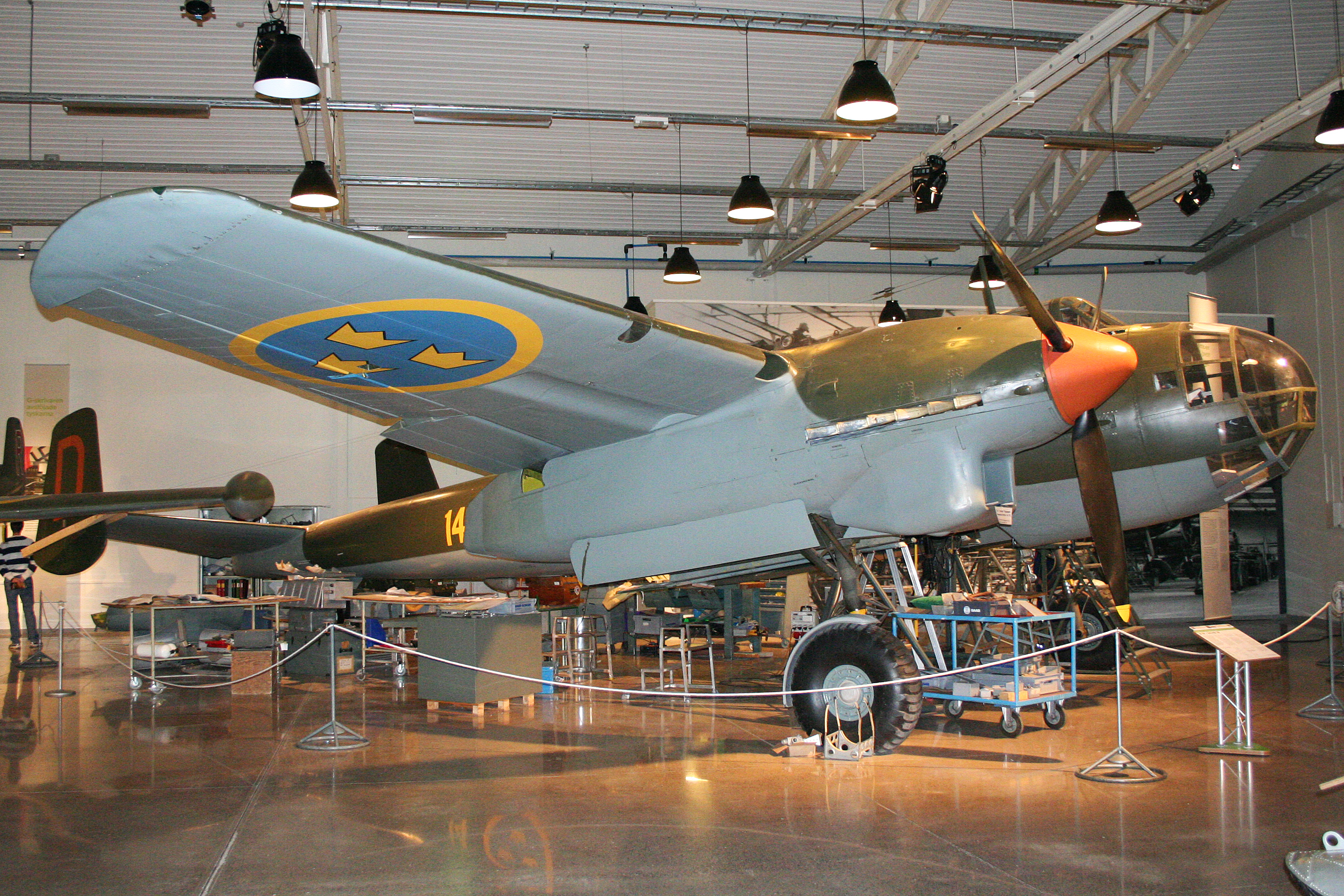
Saab B 18B on display at the Swedish Air Force Museum

Only a single example of the Saab 18 survives today: a B 18B, coded Red David. It is part of the collection of the Flygvapenmuseum, the Swedish Air Force Museum near Linköping in Sweden. One of a group of eight aircraft lost in a snowstorm in 1946, it was recovered and restored in 1979.

Another plane is believed to have survived. One aircraft from the same group that got lost in the snowstorm mentioned above was never found. A new theory of where it crashed has surfaced due to new aerial photos being released by Swedish weather and climate researchers. The plane was coded Red Niklas and according to theory it should be well preserved if it lies on the believed crash site. The Swedish Air Force has shown interest in the matter due to the plane's three crew members never being found nor buried.

== Specifications (B 18B) ==
Data from

General characteristics

- Crew: 3: pilot/navigator, radio operator/gunner, scout (at an early stage bombardier)
- Length: 13.23 m (43 ft 5 in)
- Wingspan: 17.4 m (57 ft 1 in)
- Height: 4.35 m (14 ft 3 in)
- Wing area: 43.75 m^{2} (470.9 sq ft)
- Empty weight: 6,093 kg (13,433 lb)
- Max takeoff weight: 8,793 kg (19,385 lb)
- Fuel capacity: 1,700 litres (370 imp gal; 450 US gal)
- Powerplant: 2 × SFA DB-605B inverted-vee piston engines, 1,100 kW (1,475 hp) each (1700 with modifications)
- Propellers: 3-bladed VDM-33 (German propeller but made in Sweden)

Performance

- Maximum speed: 575–590 km/h (357–367 mph, 310–319 kn) depending on altitude
- Cruise speed: 550 km/h (340 mph, 300 kn)
- Stall speed: 80 km/h (50 mph, 43 kn)
- Range: 2,600 km (1,600 mi, 1,400 nmi)
- Service ceiling: 9,800 m (32,200 ft)

Armament

- Guns:
  1 × 13.2 mm fixed akan m/39A forwards-firing gun in wing root with 300 rpg
  1 × 13.2 mm movable akan m/39 defensive gun with 300 rpg
  B 18B's delivered early had a second movable 13.2 mm akan m/39 defensive gun with 300 rpg for the scout (a leftover from the B 18A). This was quickly removed in the field due to the impracticality of it post-war and later production examples were delivered without it.
- Loadouts:
  Formally: 1,400 kilograms (3,100 lb) of bombs or 1,500 kilograms (3,300 lb) of bombs and rockets

Its biggest loadout was 2 × 600 kg bombs and 12 × rockets simultaneously.

- Rockets:
  Outer wings: ≈299 kg max

- 8 × 8 cm pansarraket m/46 AP-rocket (RP-3 rocket with Shot, 25 lb., "AP" Mk II head)
- 8 × 15 cm sprängraket m/46 HE-rocket (RP-3 rocket with Shell, H.E. 60 lb., "SAP" No. 2 Mk Ihead)
- 8 × 14,5 cm pansarsprängraket m/49A & B HEAT-rocket (Bofors 10.3 cm rocket with 14,5 cm HEAT head)
- 8 × 15 cm sprängraket m/51A & B HE-rocket (Bofors 10.3 cm rocket with 15 cm HE head)

Belly: ≈240 kg
- 4 × 8 cm pansarraket m/46 AP-rocket (RP-3 rocket with Shot, 25 lb., "AP" Mk II head)
- 4 × 15 cm sprängraket m/46 HE-rocket (RP-3 rocket with Shell, H.E. 60 lb., "SAP" No. 2 Mk Ihead)
- 4 × 14,5 cm pansarsprängraket m/49A & B HEAT-rocket (Bofors 10.3 cm rocket with 14,5 cm HEAT head)
- 4 × 15 cm sprängraket m/51A & B HE-rocket (Bofors 10.3 cm rocket with 15 cm HE head)
- 2 × 18 cm halvpansarraket m/49A & B APHE-rocket (Bofors 18 cm rocket with 18 cm APHE head. At the start used primarily against ships but in the end against basically everything else.)

- Bombs:
  Bomb bay: ≈1228 kg max

- 10 × 50 kg minbomb m/37 medium-capacity/general-purpose bombs
- 10 × 50 kg sprängbomb m/42 fragmentation bombs
- 10 × 50 kg Lysbomb m/32 flare bombs
- 10 × 50 kg Bombkapsel m/43 cluster bombs (holds 2 × 12 kg sprängbomb m/39G fragmentation bombs & 1 × 12 kg sprängbomb m/37 fragmentation bomb or 3 × 6 kg brandbomb m/39 incendiary bombs)
- 10 × 50 kg Övningsbomb m/40 practise bombs
- 10 × 8 kg övningsbomb m/40 practise bombs (addon mountings needed)
- 3 × 250 kg minbomb m/37 medium-capacity/general-purpose bomb (central fuze with bent fins)
- 3 × 250 kg minbomb m/40 medium-capacity/general-purpose bomb (central fuze with straight fins)
- 3 × 250 kg minbomb m/50 medium-capacity/general-purpose bomb (nose & central fuze with straight fins)
- 2 × 500 kg minbomb m/41 medium-capacity/general-purpose bomb (2 central fuzes with straight fins)
- 2 × 600 kg minbomb m/50 medium-capacity/general-purpose bomb (nose fuze & 2 central fuzes with straight fins)

Inner wings: ≈472 kg max
- 8 × 50 kg minbomb m/37 medium-capacity/general-purpose bombs
- 8 × 50 kg sprängbomb m/42 fragmentation bombs
- 8 × 50 kg Brandbomb m/42 incendiary bombs
- 8 × 50 kg Lysbomb m/32 flare bombs
- 8 × 50 kg Bombkapsel m/43 cluster bombs (holds 2 × 12 kg sprängbomb m/39G fragmentation bombs & 1 × 12 kg sprängbomb m/37 fragmentation bomb or 3 × 6 kg brandbomb m/39 incendiary bombs)
- 8 × 50 kg Övningsbomb m/40 practise bombs
- 8 × 8 kg övningsbomb m/40 practise bombs (addon mountings needed)

=== Armament gallery ===
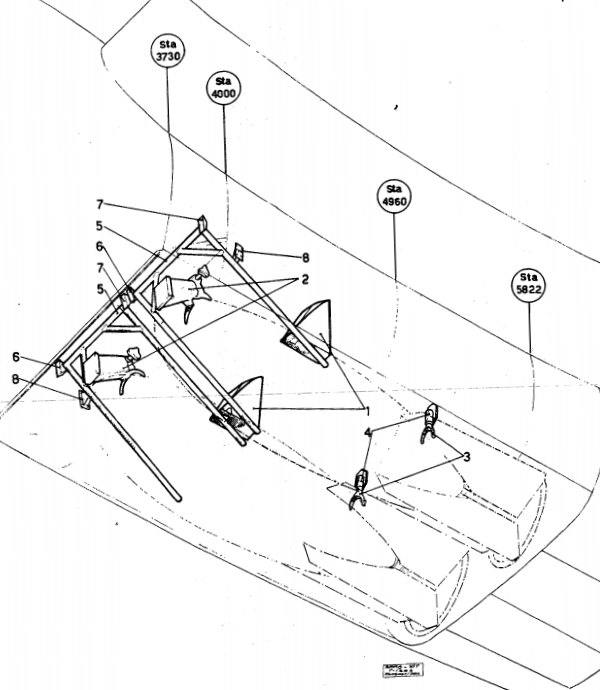
Bomb bay with 500 kg bombs (+ bomb forks)

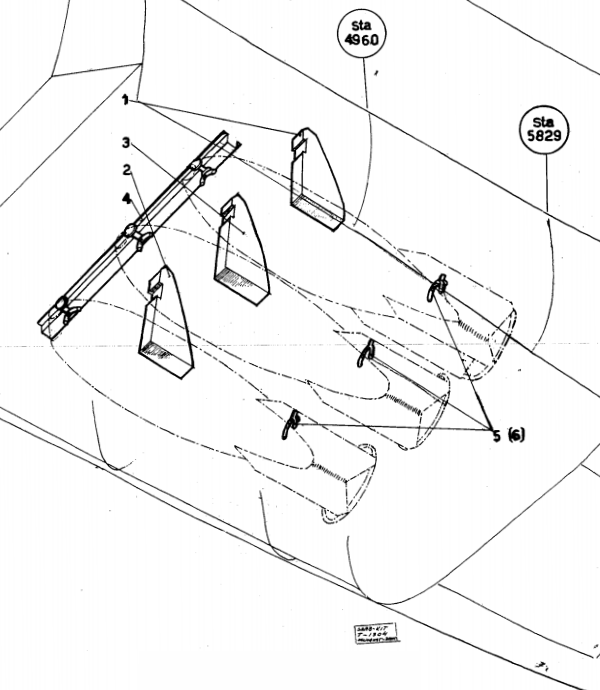
Bomb bay with 250 kg bombs

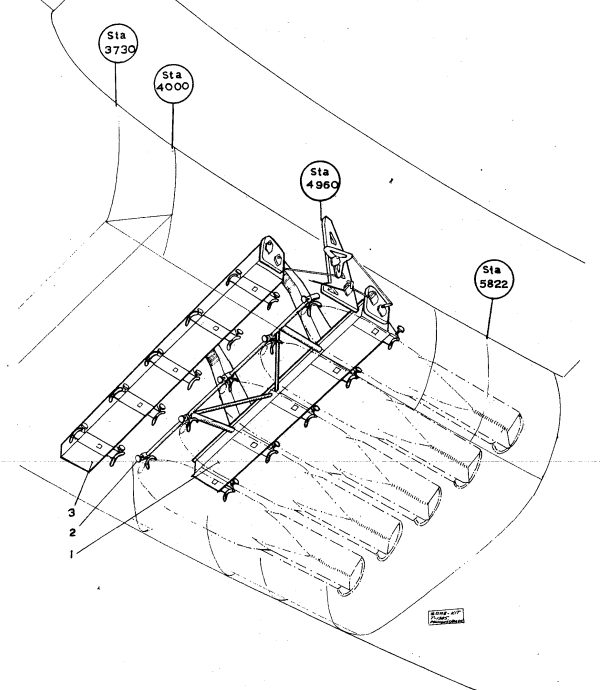
Bomb bay with 50 kg bombs

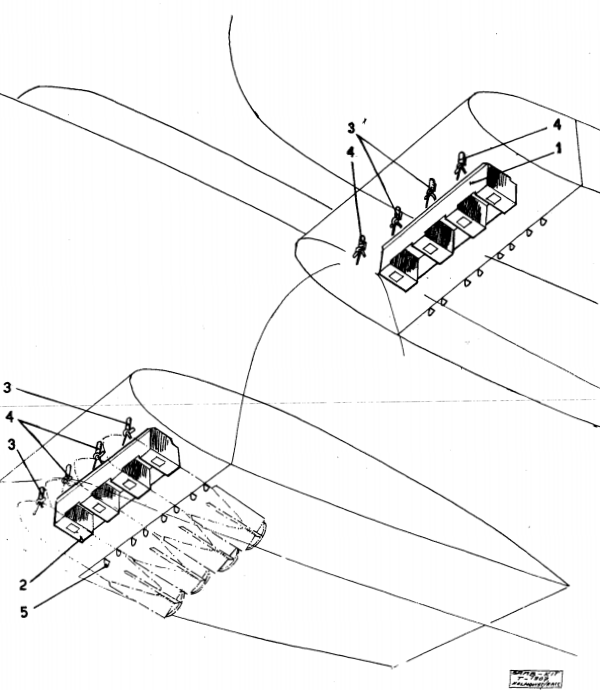
Wings with 50 kg bombs
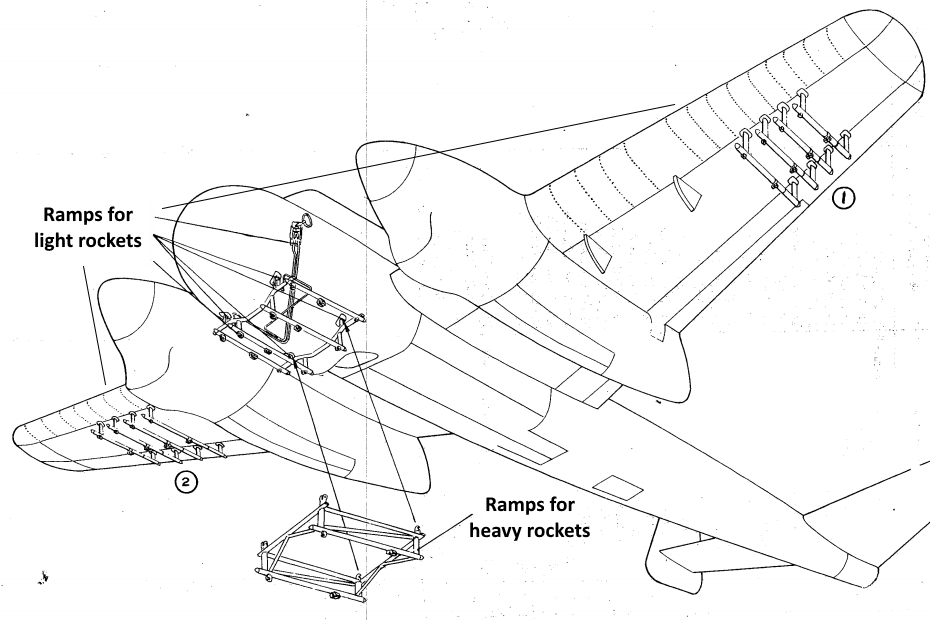
The rocket ramps of the B 18B. (The T 18B used the same wing ramps)

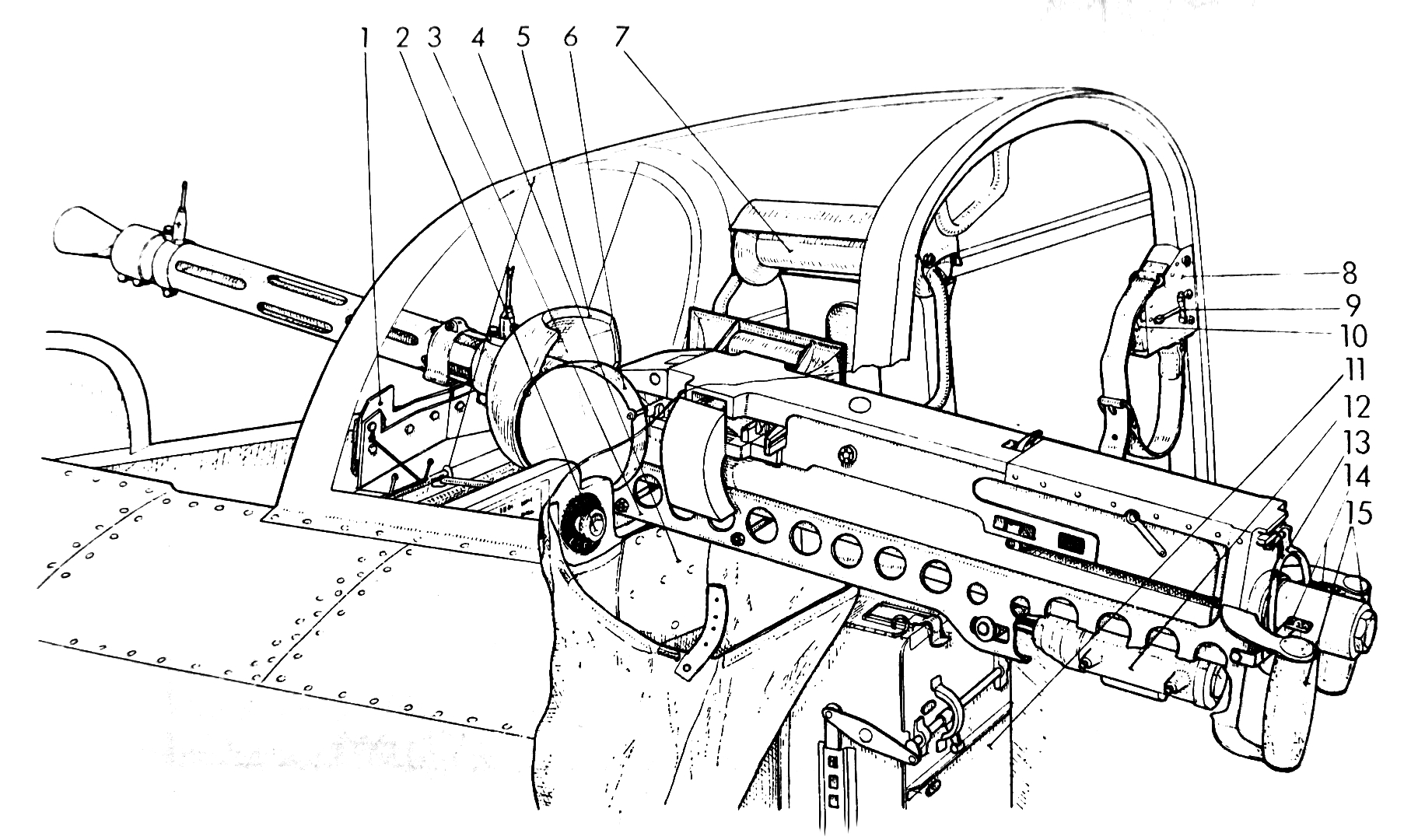
The signalist's akan m/39A autocannon. The magazine moves up as the gun shots to feed properly

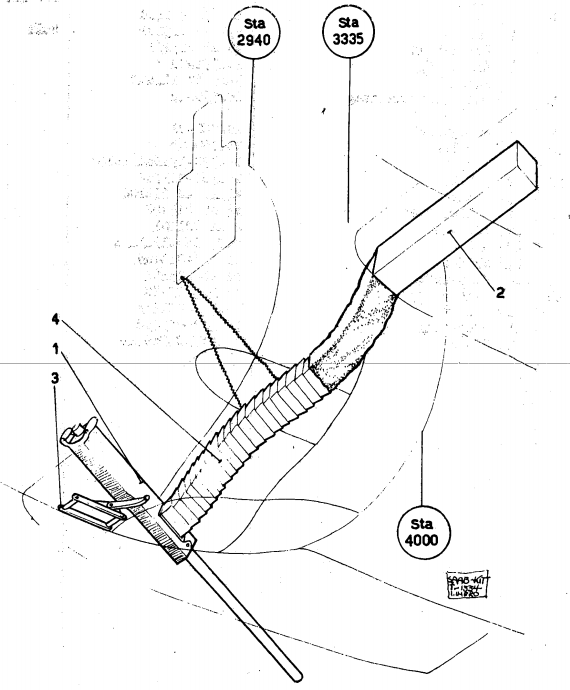
The observer's 13.2 mm akan m/39 on B 18A and early B 18B

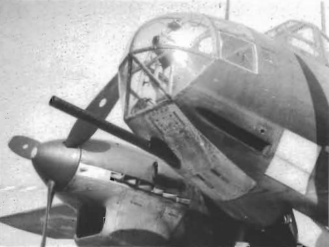
T 18B with the 57 mm akan m/47

== See also ==
Aircraft of comparable role, configuration, and era

- A-20 Havoc
- de Havilland Mosquito
- Dornier Do 17
- Messerschmitt Bf 110
- Mitsubishi G3M
- Petlyakov Pe-2

Related lists

- List of bomber aircraft
- List of military aircraft of Sweden

== Bibliography ==
- Berns, Lennart (April–July 1982). "Destination: Disaster". Air Enthusiast. No. 18. pp. 54–60. ISSN 0143-5450.
- Donald, David, ed. The Complete Encyclopedia of World Aircraft. London: Orbis, 1997. ISBN 0-7607-0592-5.
- Eliasson, Gunnar. Advanced Public Procurement as Industrial Policy: The Aircraft Industry as a Technical University. Springer, 2010. ISBN 1-4419-5848-7.
- Frawley, Gerard and Jim Thorn. International Directory of Military Aircraft, 1996/97. Motorbooks International, 1996. ISBN 1-875671-20-X.
- Kopenhagen, W. (ed.) Das große Flugzeug-Typenbuch. Stuttgart: Transpress. 1987, ISBN 3-344-00162-0.
