= AN/APS-4 search radar =

Type of aircraft radar

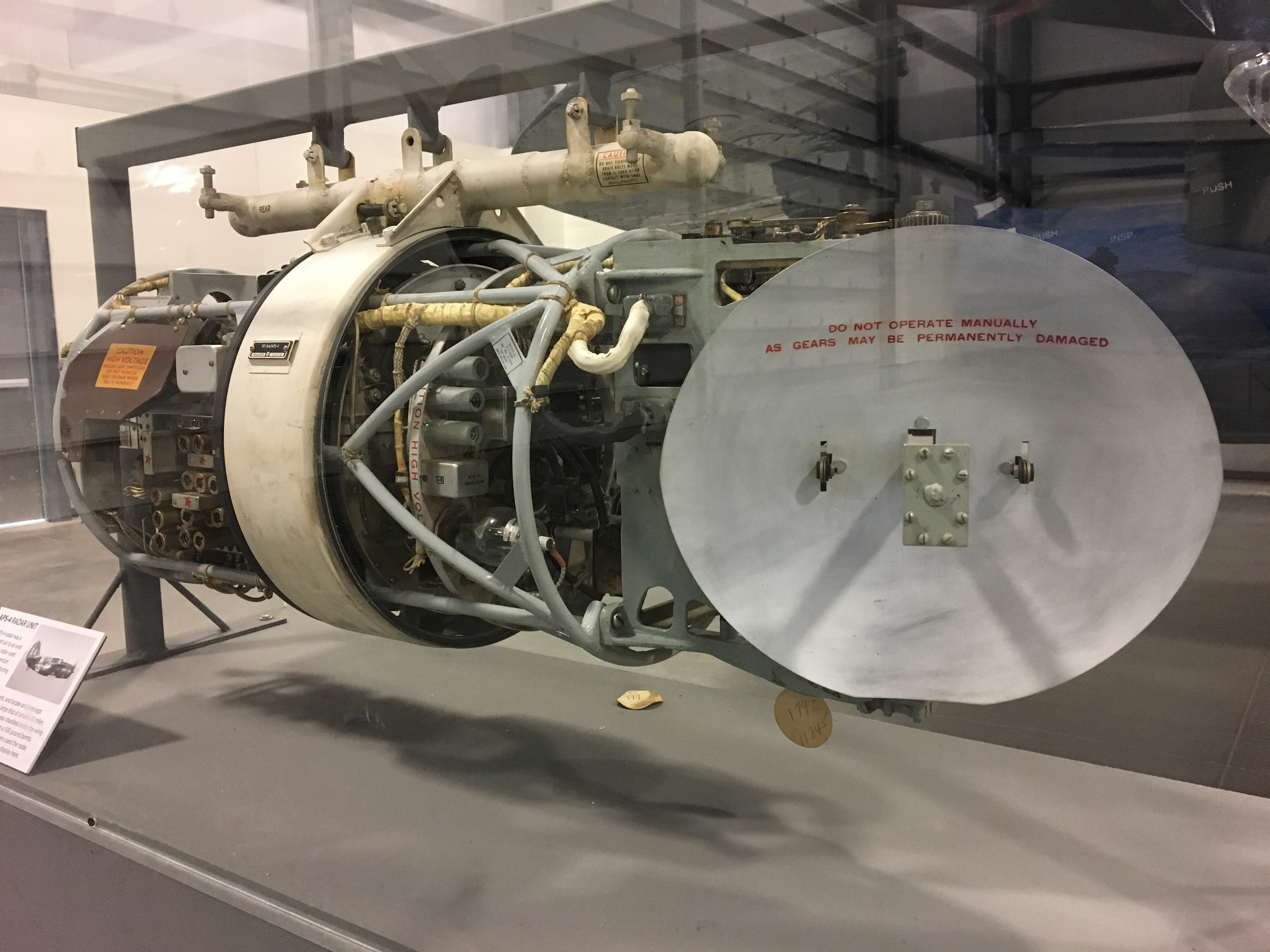
- Front-oblique view of the AN/APS-4 radar pod without its external shell
- Country of origin: United States
- Introduced: 1943
- Type: Surface-search radar
- Frequency: 3300 ±50 MHz (S-band)
- PRF: 660 pps
- Beamwidth: ~10º horizontal, ~15º vertical
- Pulsewidth: 1 μs
- RPM: 60 rpm
- Range: 1 to 100 miles (1.6–160.9 km)
- Diameter: 28 in (0.71 m)
- Azimuth: 320º
- Precision: ~5º
- Power: 40 kW
- Other names: ASH, PS-18/A
- Related: AN/APS-5, AN/APS-6

The AN/APS-4, originally designated ASH (air-surface, model H), was a lightweight 3-cm airborne radar developed during World War II for combined air-to-air interception and surface search. Designed by Bell Telephone Laboratories and manufactured by Western Electric, it became one of the most widely produced Allied airborne radars of the war, with over 13,600 units delivered by July 1945. In the British Royal Air Force, it was known as ASV Mark IX, while in the Swedish Air Force it was called the PS-18/A.

The APS-4's use of X-band frequencies at 3 cm wavelength, rather than the 10 cm S-band common to earlier radars, allowed it to be greatly reduced in size. The antenna and transmitter-receiver fit within a streamlined pod resembling a 500-pound bomb that could be mounted beneath a single wing, making the system adaptable to carrier-based fighters and small patrol aircraft. This represented an advance over previous bulky installations that required extensive aircraft modification.

== Development ==
The AN/APS-4 originated from Navy requirements for a lightweight 3-cm radar that could combine air intercept and air-to-surface search functions in carrier-based aircraft. The Bureau of Aeronautics sought equipment that would eventually replace the ASB radar operating at 60 cm wavelength.

At a conference held at the Bureau of Ships in Washington on June 30, 1942, representatives from Western Electric, Bell Telephone Laboratories, the Bureau of Ships, and the Bureau of Aeronautics established specifications for the system, designated ASH. The military's specified set needed to weigh less than 180 pounds, provide clear target detection beyond twenty miles, incorporate a droppable design for emergency jettison during combat, and anticipate both mass production and easy field maintenance. The specifications called for radar search over water for surface vessels, mapping and navigation, aircraft detection for interception, reception of coded beacon signals, and integration with IFF and low-altitude bombing equipment.

Bell Telephone Laboratories led the development effort, with Western Electric designated as the manufacturer. The Radiation Laboratory at MIT served in a consultative capacity, primarily exchanging technical information on 3-cm components. At the Navy's request, R.M. Alexander was appointed consultant and project engineer to both the Bureau of Aeronautics and Bureau of Ships. Rad Lab representatives provided substantial assistance to Bell during construction of the first experimental unit and maintained Navy oversight through Alexander's progress reports.

The completed ASH operated over four ranges—4, 20, 50, and 100 nautical miles—using Type B indicators for all search ranges and Type G indicators for short-range interception work. The equipment's final weight reached the target of 180 pounds. The first ASH model underwent completion in early 1943, with flight testing following shortly after. Their assessment judged the system a well-designed and packaged set that performed surface search functions admirably and air intercept work moderately well.

== Design ==
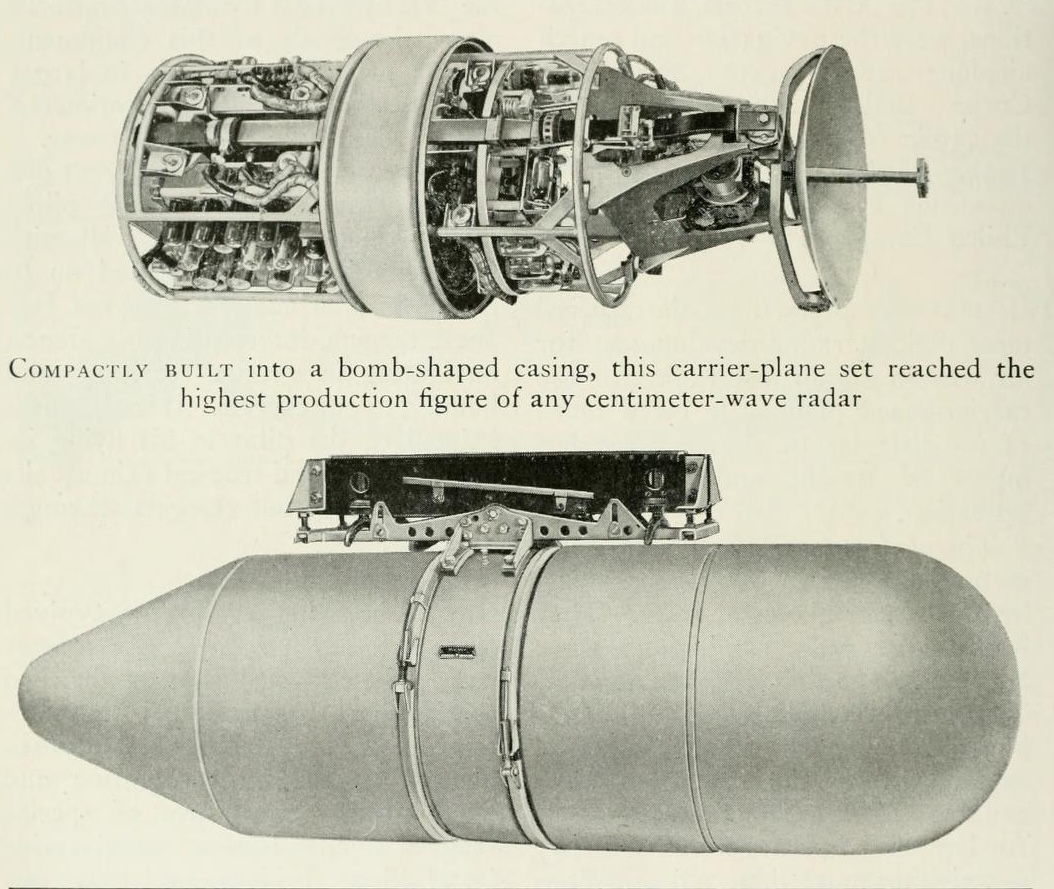

The APS-4 radar is a lightweight air-to-air and air-to-surface radar with a detection range for large ships of about 15 miles (24 km), and about 5 miles (8.0 km) against aircraft. It could also detect coastline at approximately 75 miles (121 km).

Physically, the APS-4 consists of a control box, one or two indicators, the same number of indicator-amplifiers, an antenna, a transmitter-receiver, and a cable junction box. The antenna and transmitter-receiver were typically housed externally below one wing, in a fiberglass shape that was similar to a Mk 17 500-pound (230 kg) bomb. These displays could be set for ranges of 4, 20, 50, and 100 nautical miles (6, 30, 80, and 160 km). The radar weighed 180 pounds (82 kg).

The APS-4 broadcast in the X-band with a wavelength of 3 cm. Peak broadcast power varied from 40 to 70 kW according to radar version. Pulse repetition frequency was adjustable by the operator to either 600 or 1000 pulses per second.

The APS-4 emitted a radio beam in the form of a 6° cone. The beam could be directed in three modes; manual, search, and intercept. In manual mode the beam was aimed by operator control from 10° above, to 30° below the longitudinal axis of the aircraft. In search mode, the radar beam scans through 150° in azimuth, and while doing so would run two lines scans, each separated by 4°. This caused the beam to cover 10° in a vertical plane. In intercept mode, the beam executes a four-line scan, with 6° between lines, to cover a vertical plane of 24°. Results were displayed on one or two 3-inch displays.

An improved version was called the AN/APS-5. A simplified version for single-seat fighters was called the APS-6.

== Production ==
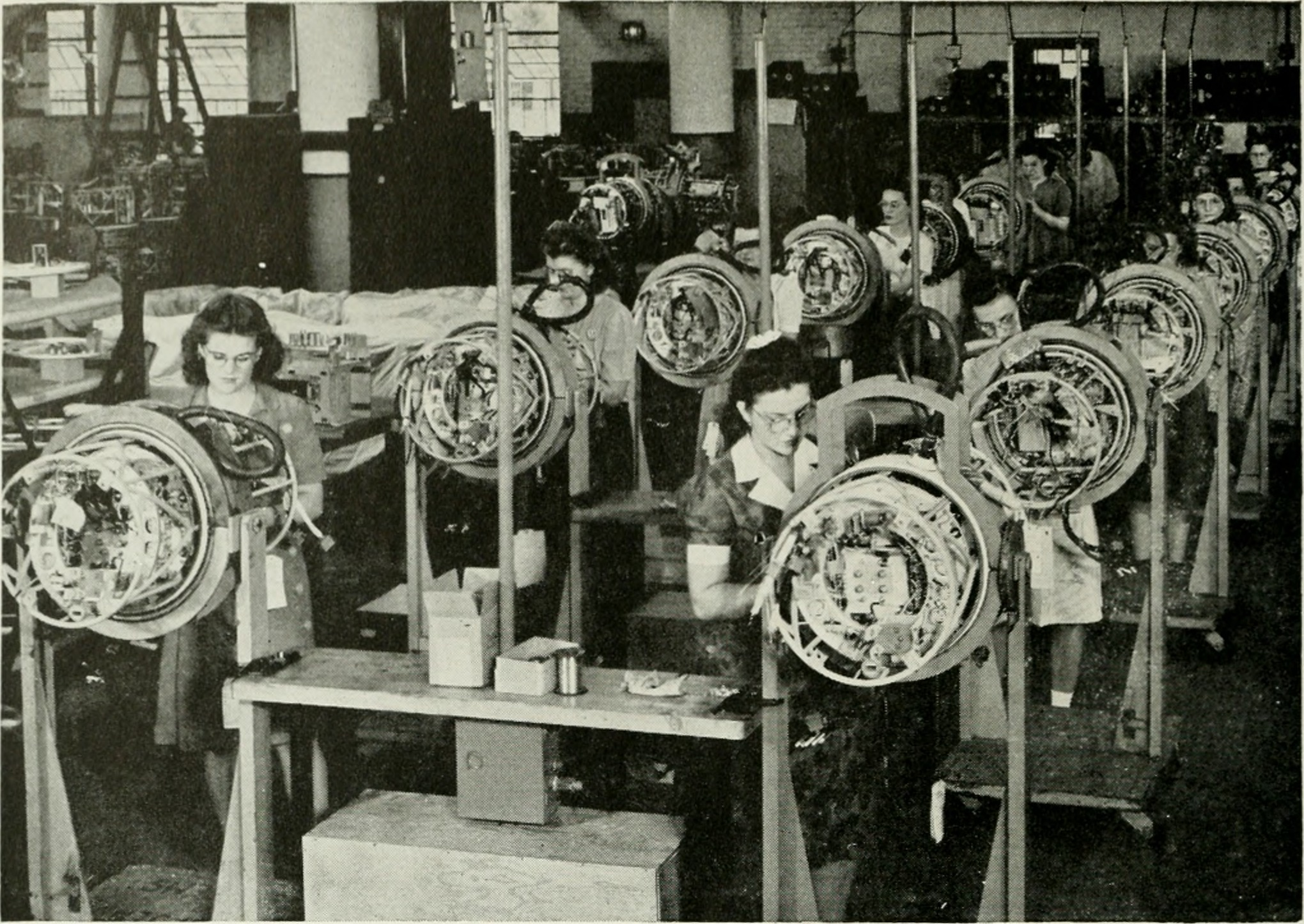
AN/APS assembly line in Cicero, Illinois

Western Electric commenced quantity production at its Hawthorne Works facility in September 1943. A contract dated June 6, 1943 called for 12,500 AN/APS-4 radars, the largest single order Western Electric received during the war. This represented one of four contracts for the project that continued through V-J Day.

Production reached 403 sets by April 1944. By July 1, 1945, total deliveries reached 13,646 units. Westinghouse produced over 4,000 sets under subcontract. Of the total Navy procurement, the Army Air Forces received 466 sets and the British purchased nearly 800 units.

== Operators ==
=== Royal Air Force ===
In Fleet Air Arm and RAF service, it was known as ASV Mark IX and equipped a number of aircraft including the Fairey Firefly, Fairey Barracuda, de Havilland Mosquito and a small number of Grumman Avengers.

=== United States Air Force ===
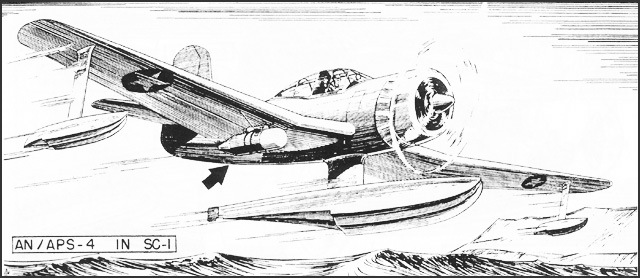
AN/APS-4 mounted on the wing of a Curtiss SC-1

In American service, AN/APS-4 it was used on many aircraft, including the Douglas C-47 Skytrain, North American P-82D/F/H Twin Mustang, Vought F4U-2\5N Corsair, Grumman F6F-3/5 Hellcat, Curtiss SB2C-5 Helldiver and Grumman TBF-3 and TBM-3S Avenger, and Curtiss SC Seahawk.

=== Swedish Air Force ===
In service of the Swedish Air Force, it was known as PS-18/A and was equipped on the Saab 18, primarily on the reconnaissance version, S 18A but it was also used on the bomber and torpedo versions B 18A, B 18B, and T 18B. The PS-18/A had slightly improved maritime performance: the beacon navigation function was disabled, and a sea clutter filter, a simple, switchable shortened time constant in the video chain, was introduced.
