= R37 expressway (Czech Republic) =

Road in the Czech Republic

Expressway R37
- Rychlostní silnice R37

Route information
- Length: 21.5 km (13.4 mi) Planned: 38.5 km (23.9 mi) / 82.7 km (51.4 mi)

Major junctions
- From: Polish border 20 km away from Trutnov
- D11 near Hradec Králové, R35 near Hradec Králové
- To: Kunčí about 6 km from Chrudim

Location
- Country: Czech Republic
- Regions: Hradec Králové, Pardubice
- Major cities: Hradec Králové, Pardubice

Highway system
- Highways in the Czech Republic

Expressway R37 (Czech: rychlostní silnice R37) is an expressway in eastern Bohemia. Currently, it connects the most important cities in the eastern Bohemia: Hradec Králové and Pardubice.

None of these sections are signed as an expressway right now.

As of 2006, it has:

- 19.3 km between Hradec Králové and Pardubice (5 km 4 lanes, 14.3 km 2 lanes)
- 2.2 km in Pardubice
- 4.5 km under construction south of Pardubice
- 12.7 km in planning
- 44.2 km considered
