= Hotchkiss 13.2 mm machine gun =

Hotchkiss 13.2 mm machine gun Mitrailleuse Hotchkiss de 13,2 mm
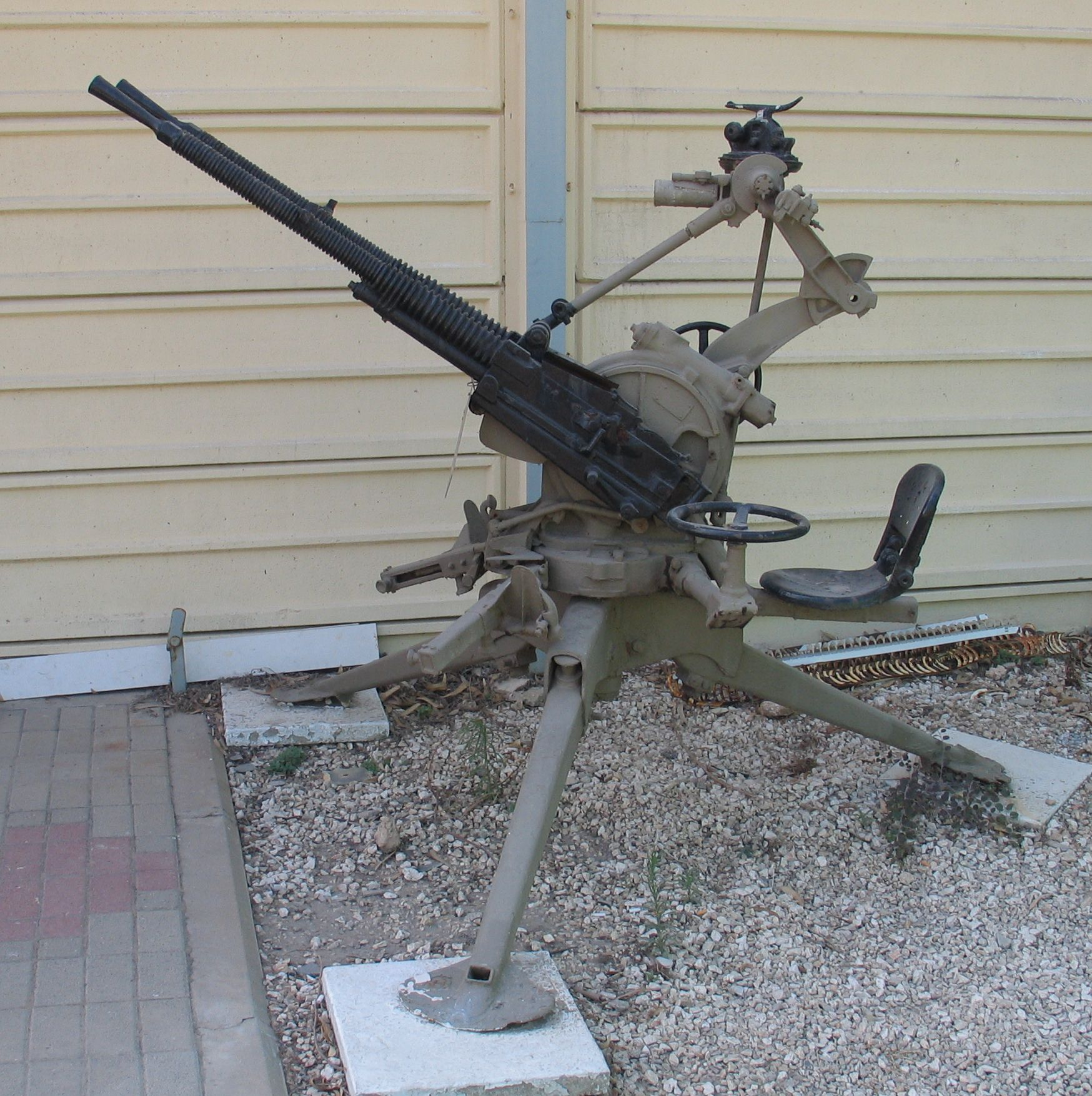
- A mitrailleuse de 13.2 mm CA mle 1930 in Batey ha-Osef Museum, Tel Aviv, Israel.
- Type: Heavy machine gun
- Place of origin: France

Service history
- Used by: See Users
- Wars: World War II

Production history
- Designed: 1929
- Manufacturer: Hotchkiss et Cie

Specifications
- Mass: 37.5 kg (83 lbs) single gun, stripped
- Length: 1.67 m (5 ft 6 in)
- Barrel length: 1 m (3 ft 3 in)
- Shell: 13.2×99mm Hotchkiss Long (intr. 1929); 13.2×96mm Hotchkiss Short (intr. 1935)
- Caliber: 13.2 mm
- Action: Gas operated
- Elevation: -10° to +90°
- Traverse: 360°
- Rate of fire: 450 rpm (cyclic); 200-250 rpm (sustained)
- Muzzle velocity: 800 m/s (2,625 ft/s)
- Effective firing range: 4,200 m (13,800 ft) AA ceiling
- Maximum firing range: 7.2 km (4.5 mi) at 45°
- Feed system: 30-round box magazine, or 15-round feed strip

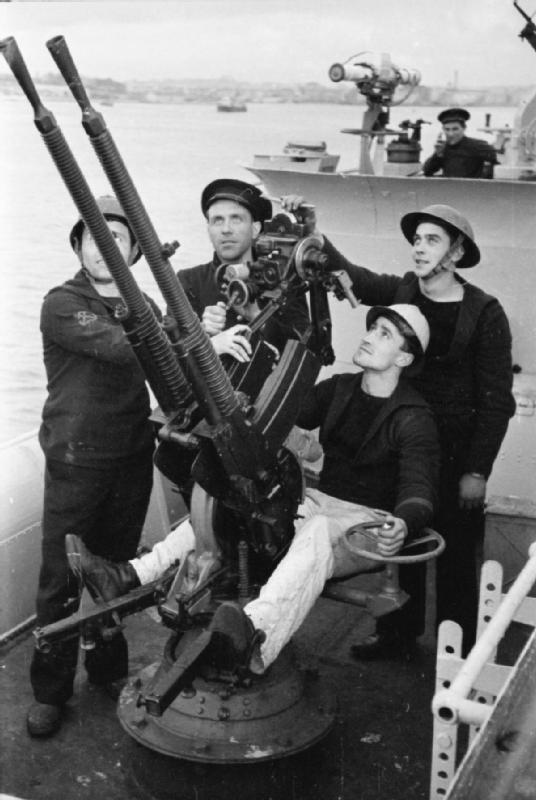
A dual gun pedestal mount of the Free French Navy

The Hotchkiss 13.2 mm machine gun (French: Mitrailleuse Hotchkiss de 13,2 mm), also known as the Hotchkiss M1929 machine gun (Mle 1929, Mle 1930, etc.), was a heavy machine gun, primarily intended for anti-aircraft use, designed and manufactured by French arms manufacturer Hotchkiss et Cie from the late 1920s until World War II, which saw service with various nations' forces, including Italy and Japan where the gun was built under license.

== Development ==
In the 1920s, Hotchkiss developed a range of anti-aircraft automatic weapons in the 13.2, 25 and 37 mm calibers. They were all based on the same type of gas-operated action, similar to the one used in the 8 mm Hotchkiss Mle 1914 machine gun, which had proven extremely reliable during World War I and was still in service.

The 13.2 mm machine gun project was started in 1922 as an aircraft machine gun, but the French government classified the belt-fed version (while not funding its further development), and only the magazine version (only useful for ground and naval use) was allowed to be exported, starting from around 1927.

=== Performance ===
The Hotchkiss M1929 machine gun had a cyclic rate of fire of 450 rounds per minute, but their practical sustained rate of fire was just 200-250 rounds per minute due to limited magazine capacity. The majority of Hotchkiss M1929 machine guns were fed by overhead, 30 round, curved box magazines. These magazines would run empty in 4 seconds, requiring frequent magazine changes which limited their rate of fire.

=== Cartridges ===
The Hotchkiss M1929 machine gun was initially chambered for the cartridge 13.2 × 99 mm Hotchkiss "Long", which essentially was a 12.7 × 99 mm Browning (.50 BMG) cartridge necked up to 13.2 mm caliber. This cartridge however proved to wear out gun barrels too quickly and to alleviate this inconvenience Hotchkiss introduced a new cartridge for the M1929 machine gun in 1935, featuring a slightly shorter cartridge case and reworked projectile shape, becoming the cartridge 13.2 x 96 mm Hotchkiss "Short". The new cartridge was practically identical to the original 13.2 x 99 mm cartridge except for the length of the neck, reducing the full case length to 96 mm. This minimal change was done so that existing weapons and the production line did not require any modification to fire the new cartridge, but was sufficient to fix the barrel wear issue.

=== Configurations ===
The Hotchkiss M1929 machine gun came in a number of different configurations depending on their intended role. There were single, double and quadruple barreled anti-aircraft weapons on a high-angle pedestal and tripod mounts, as well as low-angle bipod mounts for anti-tank and heavy machine gun roles.

French infantry commanders, who had expressed interest in acquiring light anti-aircraft guns, refused to accept the 13.2 mm. They argued that the heavy bullets falling down could be dangerous to friendly troops, and preferred larger calibers for which self-destructing shells were available. But the 13.2 mm Hotchkiss saw extensive use as a naval gun and was also chosen by the French cavalry for some of its armored vehicles.

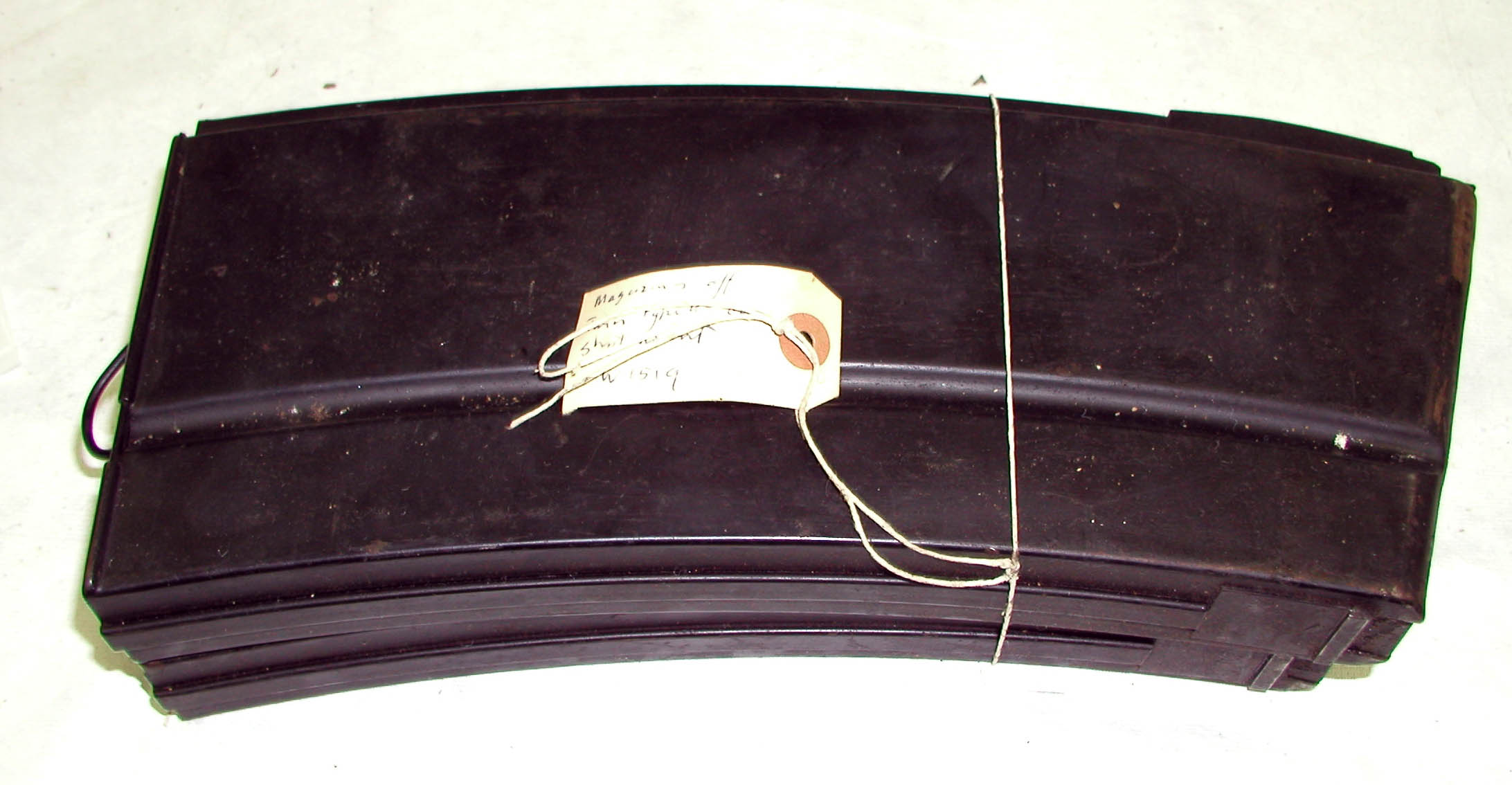
A Japanese 30 round box magazine

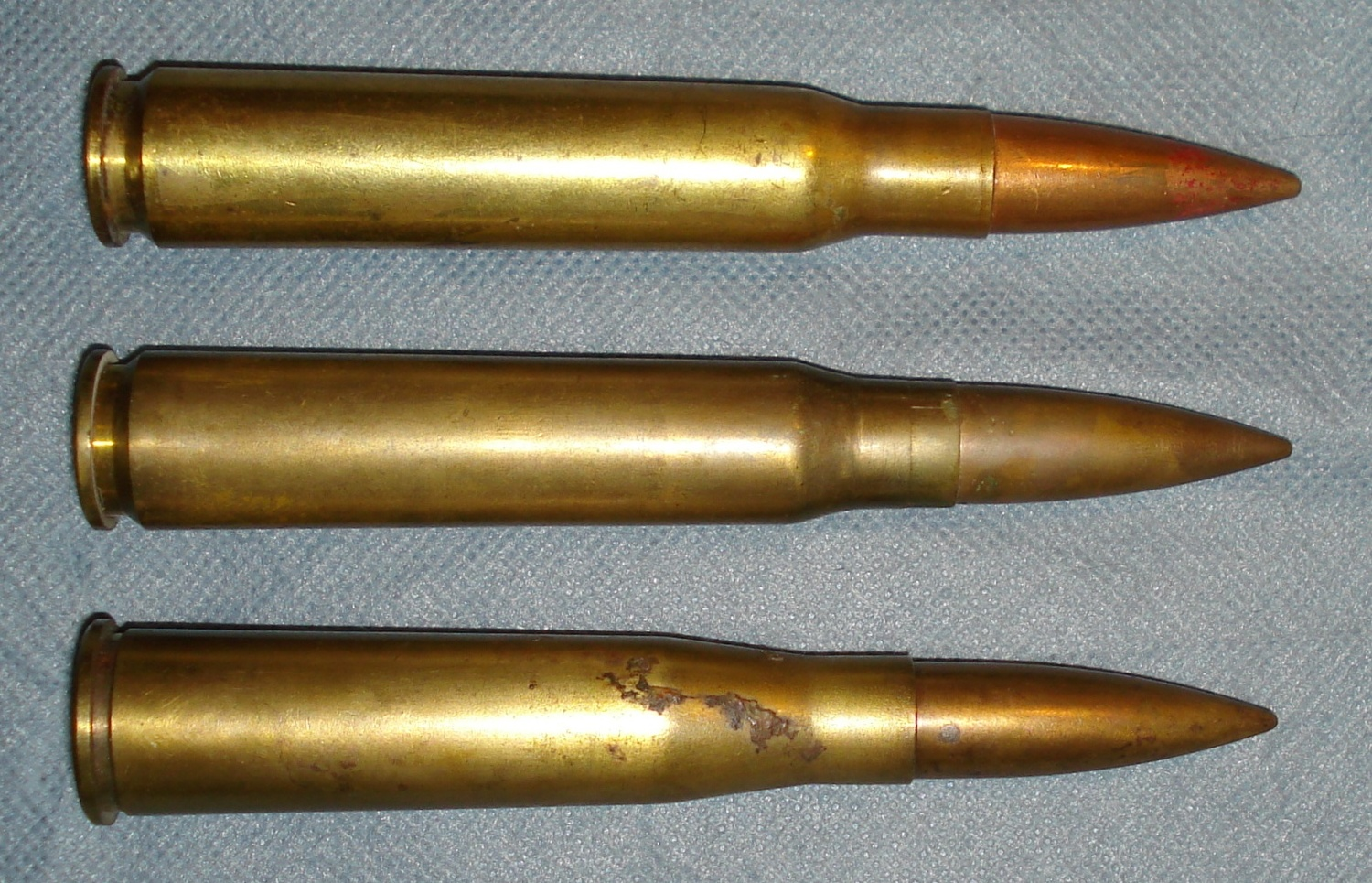
13.2 mm cartridges top to bottom:
13.2×99mm Hotchkiss Long
13.2×96mm Hotchkiss Short
13.2×92mmSR Mauser TuF

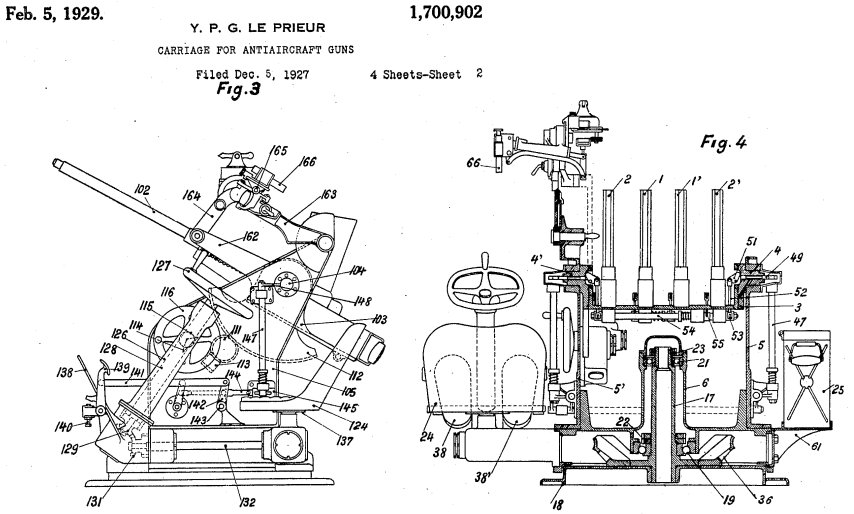
A quadruple naval mounting, as illustrated in US Patent 1700902 filed by Yves Le Prieur

== Service ==
=== As a ground-based anti-aircraft weapon ===
The French Air Force used the M1929, designated as mitrailleuse de 13.2 mm CA mle 1930, for close-range defense of its airfields and other strategic places.

It came in two versions:

- A single gun with a stock and pistol grip that came in a dual-purpose anti-aircraft/anti-armor mounting. It had a two-wheeled split-trailed carriage that weighed 117 kg (259 lb) empty and 155 kg (342 lb) with the machine-gun mounted. When the swing-arm the gun was affixed to was locked upwards, it could be used in an anti-aircraft mode. When the arm was collapsed and a bipod extended it could fire straight ahead in an anti-tank role. When the gun was packed up and the trails closed, it was towed behind its caisson, which was pulled by a horse or by the gunner.
- A fixed tripod mount with a seat and anti-aircraft sight for the gunner. This came in single or twin mounts. The single mount weighted 120 kg (270 lb) empty, 160 kg (352 lb) mounted. The double mount weighed 225 kg (496 lb) empty, 300 kg (662 lb) mounted.

=== As a naval weapon ===
Early in World War II, the French, Italian and Japanese navies were using twin (CAD Mle 1929 - Contre Avions Double) and quadruple (CAQ mle 1929 - Contre Avions Quadruple) mountings on many of their warships. French warships that were refitted in the United States in 1943, such as the battleship Richelieu or the destroyer Le Terrible, had their 13.2 mm machine guns replaced by more powerful Oerlikon 20 mm cannons.

In Italy, the Società Italiana Ernesto Breda produced the gun under license as the Breda Mod.31 from 1931 onwards. It was used as an anti-aircraft gun aboard ships, submarines, and armored trains of the Royal Italian Navy. After World War II it was used on the patrol boats of the Guardia di Finanza.

The Spanish Navy bought the weapon in December 1935 and used it during the Civil War (where it was mounted on several Republican Navy destroyers and cruisers). The "Pirotecnia Militar" Army Ammunition plant (Sevilla) produced its cartridges after 1939.

=== As a ground weapon ===
Several self-propelled anti-aircraft combinations were tested in the 1930s, with Citroën-Kegresse or Berliet chassis, but none was mass-produced. The 13.2 mm Hotchkiss was used on the Belgian T15 and the French AMR 35 light tanks as well as on the White-Laffly AMD 80 armoured car and on fortifications. The Free French used field-modified self-propelled mountings, with guns recovered from French ships, in North-East Africa in 1942. The Breda Mod.31 was used as an anti-aircraft and heavy machine gun on command tanks of the Royal Italian Army as well as on L3/33 light tanks sold to Brazil. The Japanese mounted license-produced version of the gun on a number of Type 92 Heavy armored Cars which had initially been armed with only a pair of 6.5 mm machine guns.

=== Greek version ===
The Hotchkiss 13.2mm dual purpose is the Greek modified version of French Hotchkiss 13,2 mm.The Greek version, in contrast to the other versions, was fed by a rigid metal band (feed strip) on the sides of the weapon and was used with an articulated tripod, dual use. This machine gun used as anti-aircraft and anti-tank by the Greek army in WW2.

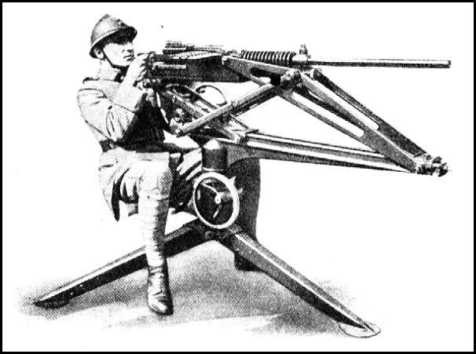
Greek version Hotchkiss dual purpose

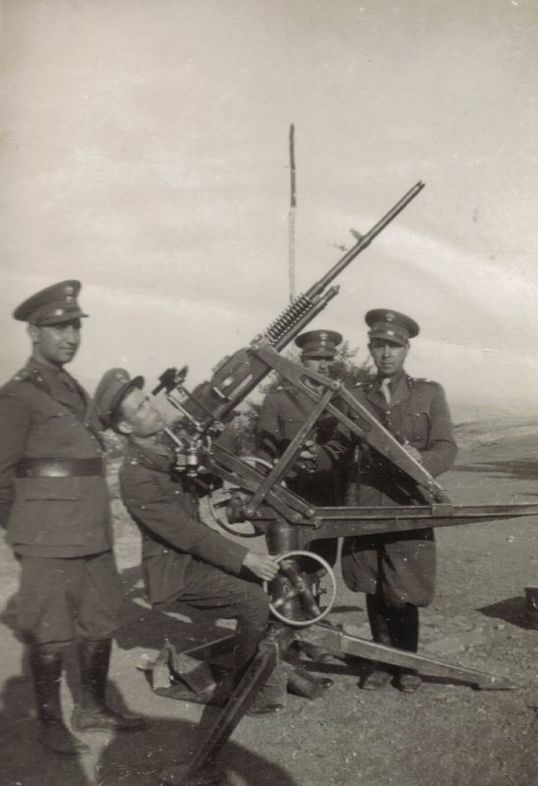
A group of officers with a 13,2 mm Hotchkiss dual purpose in Edessa

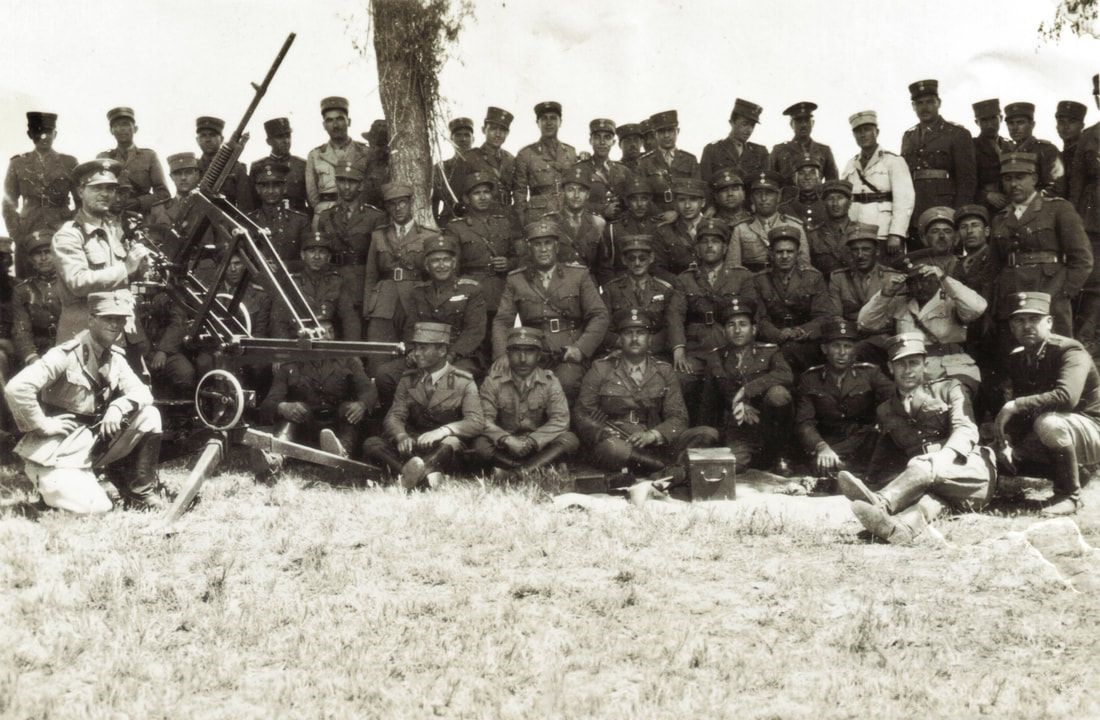
Anti-aircraft machine guns and mortars training, Larissa, June 3, 1937

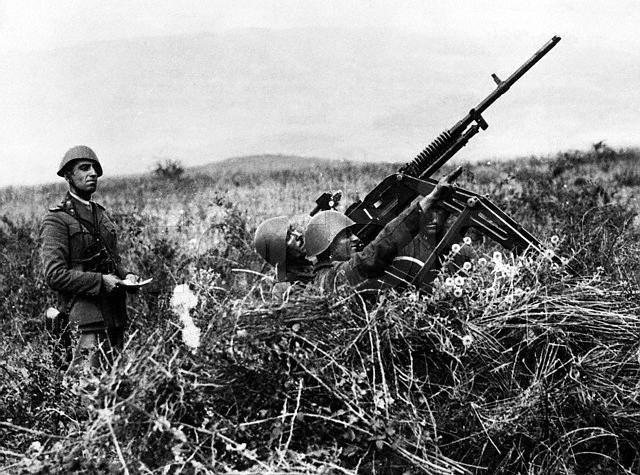
Greek soldiers operate Hotchkiss

== Users ==
Japanese attack on Shanghai

- Belgium
- Brazil
- France
- Nazi Germany - Captured French guns were designated MG 271(f).
- Greece - Hotchkiss 13.2mm dual purpose a modified version with larger magazine capacities and closed-bolt operation
- Israel
- Italy - Built under license as the Breda Model 1931 machine gun.
- Japan - Built under license as the Type 92 tank machine gun and Type 93 heavy machine gun.
- Poland - Designated the wz.30.
- Taiwan
- Romania - 200 delivered before the Fall of France and delivered by Germans from captured material
- Spain
- Sweden - License built Breda Model 1931 machine guns bought from Italy. Designated 13,2 mm kulspruta M/It (13,2 mm ksp M/It)
- Kingdom of Yugoslavia

== Gallery ==
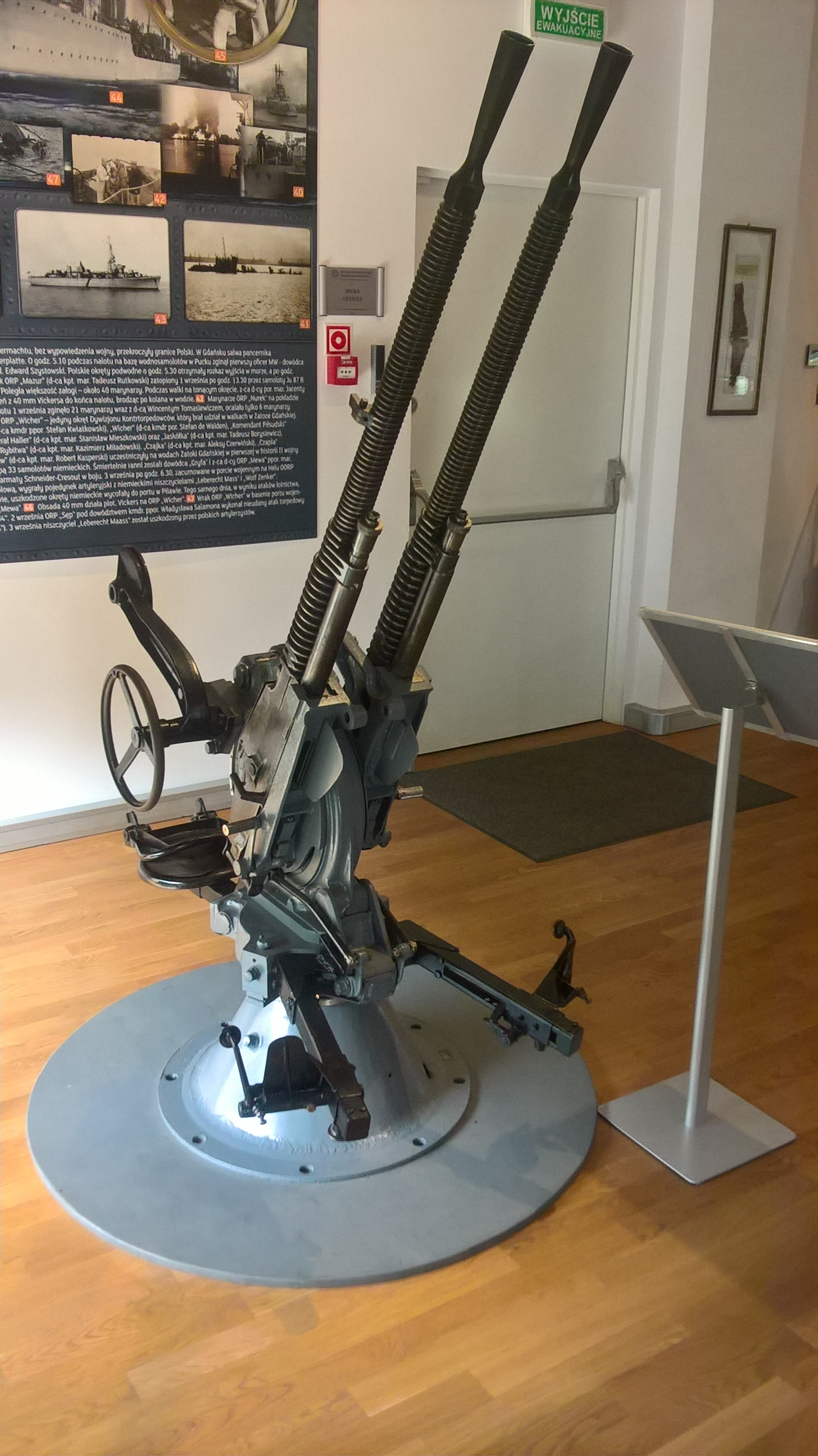
A wz.30 dual gun pedestal mount used on the Polish submarine ORP Żbik

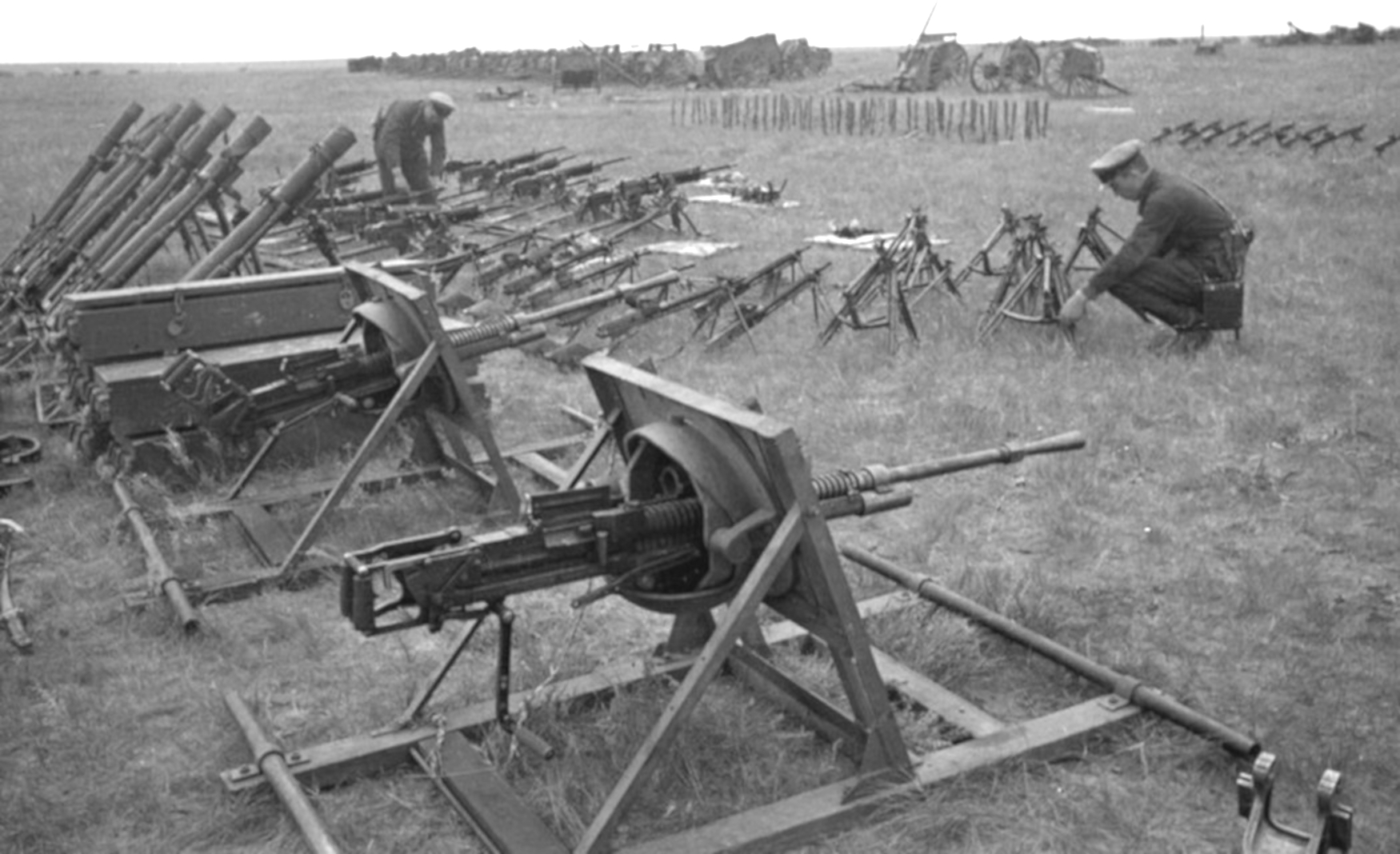
Japanese Type 92 tank machine gun (foreground)

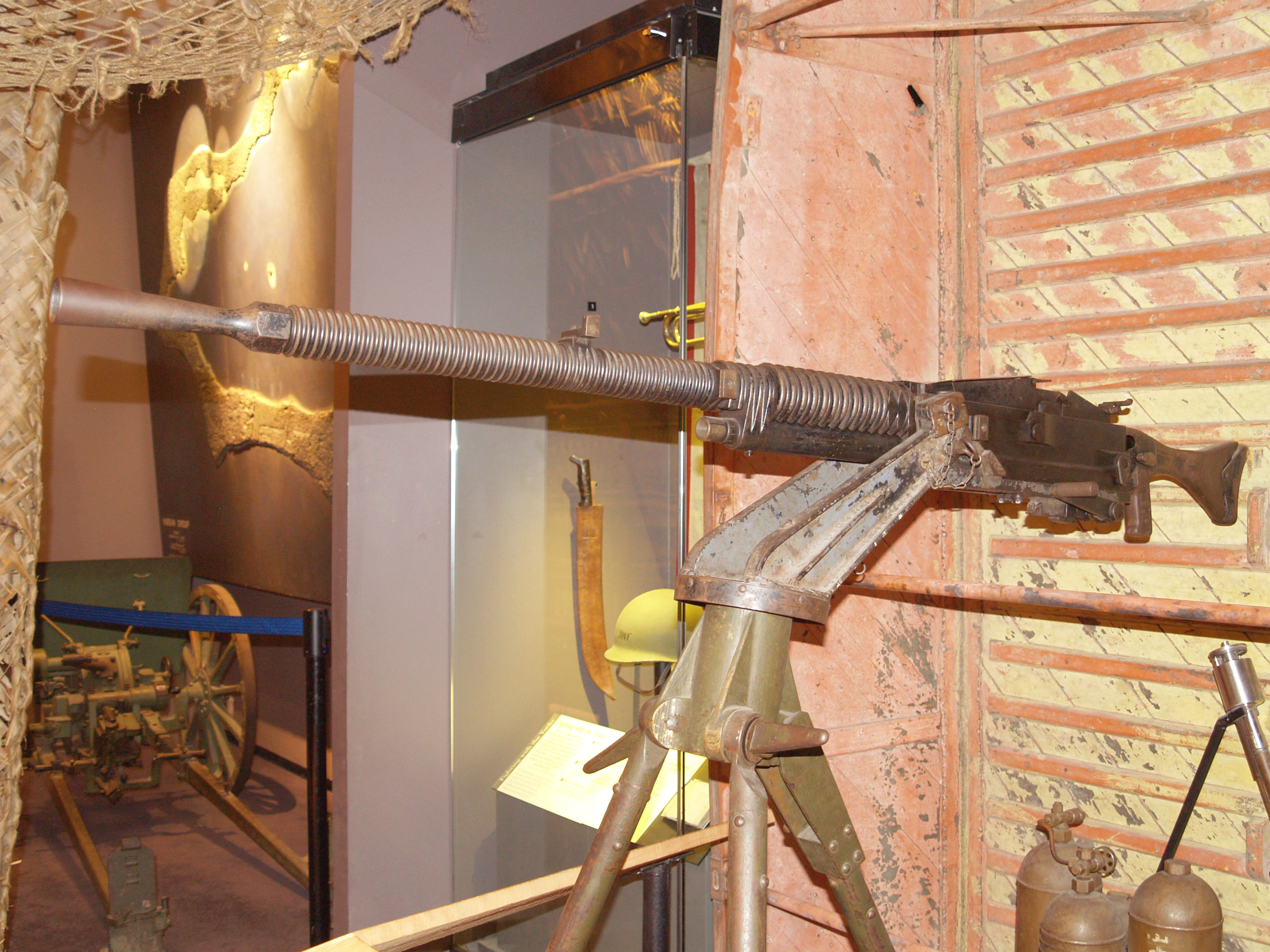
The related Japanese Type 93 single mount

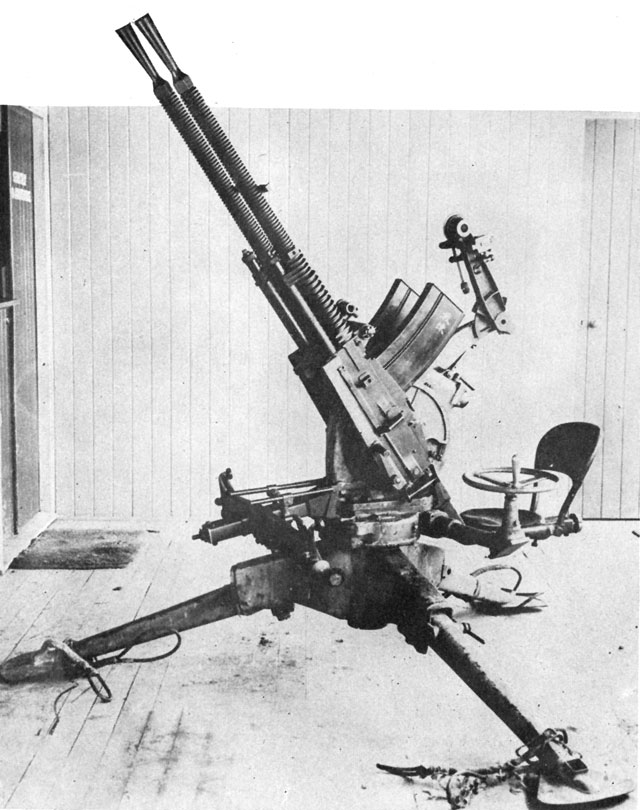
The related Japanese Type 93 double mount

== See also ==
- Anti-aircraft gun
- 25 mm Hotchkiss anti-aircraft gun - A closely related French anti-aircraft gun.
- Type 96 25 mm AT/AA Gun - A closely related Japanese anti-aircraft gun.
