= Renard R.36 =

R.36
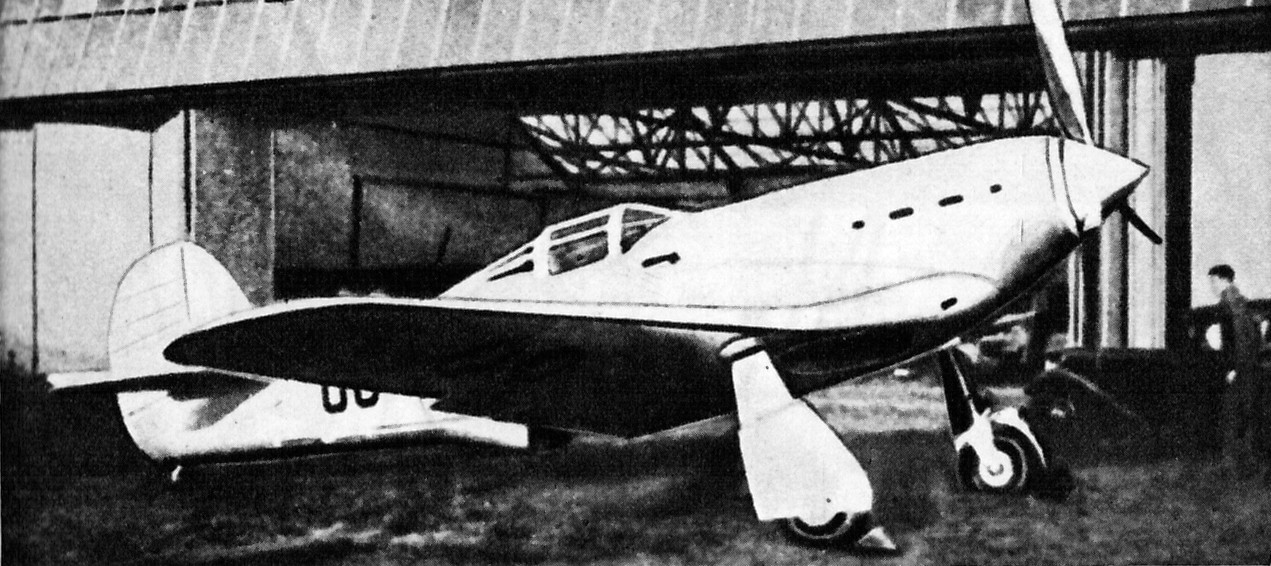

General information
- Type: Fighter
- Manufacturer: Renard
- Designer: Alfred Renard
- Number built: 1

History
- First flight: 5 November 1937

The Renard R.36 was a Belgian all-metal fighter aircraft designed by Alfred Renard to replace the Fairey Firefly IIM within the Belgian Air Force. Designed to improve on the Renard Epervier, which was never adopted by the Belgian government, the prototype R.36 first flew on 5 November 1937. Following testing the R.36 was selected by the Belgian Air Force in late 1938, with 40 aircraft provisionally ordered, to be delivered in two years.

However, on 17 January 1939 the prototype, OO-ARW, crashed near Nivelles, killing pilot Lt. Viscount Eric de Spoelberch. The official investigation was inconclusive, no evidence of material failure being discovered, with the most probable causes being radio equipment coming loose during a high-G manoeuvre, jamming the controls, or the pilot becoming incapacitated. The airframe had accumulated 75:30 hours' flight time. The order was then dropped in favour of licence production of the Hawker Hurricane by SABCA.

== Variants ==
=== R.36 ===
Single-seat fighter powered by a 680 kW (910 hp) Hispano-Suiza 12Ycrs engine, one built. Armament was 4 × 7.7 mm FN Browning machine guns and 1 × 20 mm autocannon, and a 3 × 20 mm autocannons configuration was planned.

Several variants were also planned but not built;

The R.36B, a two-seater variant, the R.36E, a lightened two-seater training variant with a weaker engine (400 to 600 hp), and the R.36R, a standard R.36 but with smaller wings (16 m^{2} instead of 20).

=== R.37 ===
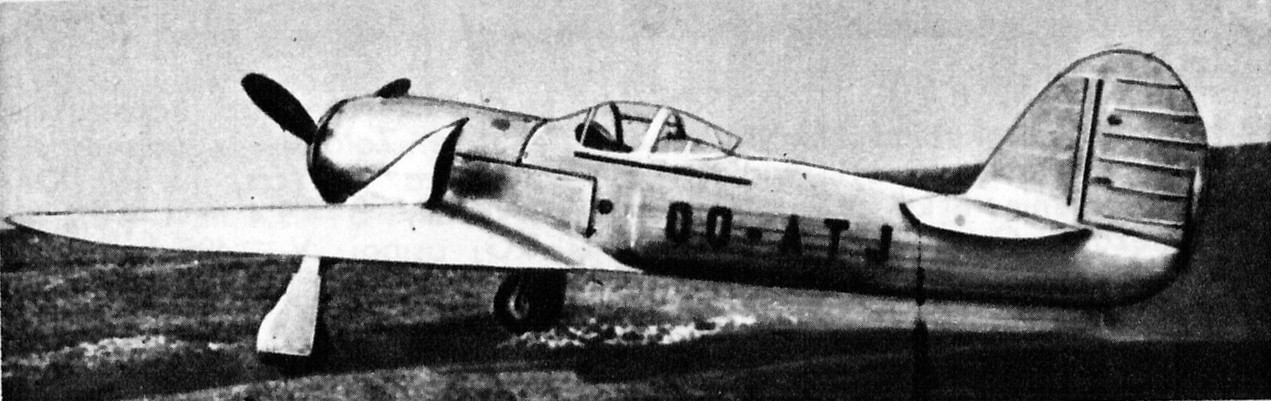
Renard R.37

Version of R.36 powered by a 820 kW (1,100 hp) Gnome-Rhône 14N-21 radial engine, one aircraft captured by German forces in May 1940. Planned armament was 4 × 7.7 mm FN Browning machine guns or 2 × 13.2 mm FN Browning shell firing guns. Technical documentation from the "Ateliers Renard" also mention the possibility of fitting the R.37 with a composite armament of 2 × 13.2 mm FN Browning machine guns and 2 × 20 mm autocannons or with 6 × 7.7 mm FN Browning machine guns.

=== R.38 ===
Derivative of R.36 aircraft powered by a 770 kW (1,030 hp) Rolls-Royce Merlin II. One built, which was first flown on 4 August 1939 reaching a speed of 545 km/h (339 mph) during testing. Prototype evacuated to France but captured by German forces and scrapped. Planned armament was 4 × 7.7 mm FN Browning machine guns or 4 × 13.2 mm FN Browning shell firing guns. Technical documentation from the "Ateliers Renard" also planned the use of 4 × 20 mm autocannons.

=== R.40 ===
Unfinished variant of the R.38 built at the request of the French air force. It was supposed to be a high-altitude fighter with a detachable cabin armed with 4 × 7.7mm FN Browning machine guns or 4 × 13.2mm FN Browning machine guns. Technical documentation from the "Ateliers Renard" also planned the use of 4 × 20 mm autocannons.

=== R.42 ===
Proposed twin fuselage variant of the R.40, similar to the F-82 Twin Mustang. Proposed armament was four 13.2 mm FN Browning shell firing guns and four 20 mm autocannons, with an estimated top speed of 680 km/h.

== Operators ==
Belgium

- Belgian Air Force

== Specifications (R.36) ==

Data from

General characteristics

- Crew: 1
- Length: 8.8 m (28 ft 10 in)
- Wingspan: 11.64 m (38 ft 2 in)
- Height: 2.9 m (9 ft 6 in)
- Wing area: 20 m^{2} (220 sq ft)
- Empty weight: 1,770 kg (3,902 lb)
- Gross weight: 2,470 kg (5,445 lb)
- Powerplant: 1 × Hispano-Suiza 12Ycrs V-12 liquid-cooled piston engine, 680 kW (910 hp)
- Propellers: 3-bladed variable-pitch propeller

Performance

- Maximum speed: 505 km/h (314 mph, 273 kn) at 4,000 m (13,000 ft)
- Range: 1,000 km (620 mi, 540 nmi)
- Time to altitude: 4,000 m (13,000 ft) in 4 minutes 56 seconds
- Wing loading: 123.5 kg/m^{2} (25.3 lb/sq ft)

Armament

- Guns: 1 × engine mounted 20 mm (0.787 in) cannon, 4 × wing-mounted 7.7 mm (0.303 in) machine guns

== See also ==
Aircraft of comparable role, configuration, and era

- Curtiss P-36 Hawk
- Hawker Hurricane
- Morane-Saulnier M.S.406
