= 9×57mm Mauser =

Rifle cartridge

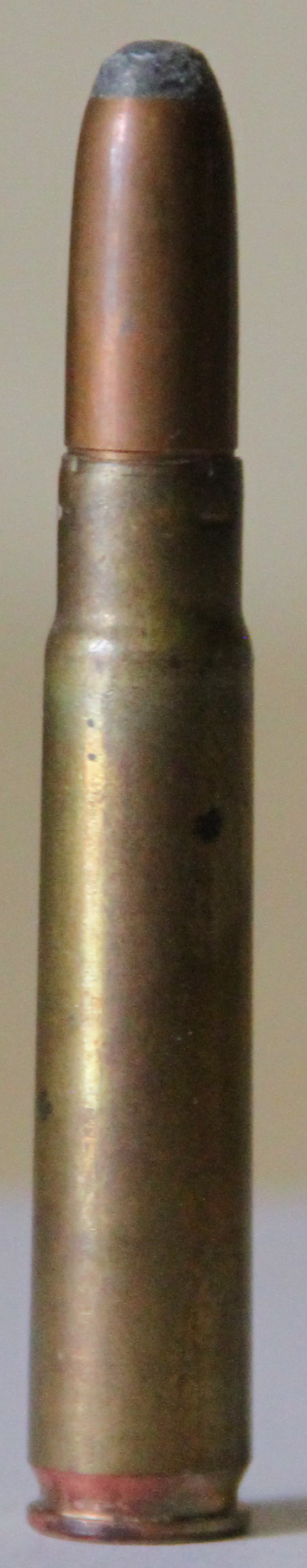
- Type: Rifle
- Place of origin: German Empire

Production history
- Designer: Unknown
- Designed: 1890s
- Produced: 1890s–1938
- Variants: 9×57mmR (rimmed)

Specifications
- Parent case: 7.92×57mm Mauser
- Case type: Rimless, bottleneck
- Bullet diameter: 9.1 mm (0.36 in)
- Neck diameter: 9.8 mm (0.39 in)
- Shoulder diameter: 10.9 mm (0.43 in)
- Base diameter: 11.9 mm (0.47 in)
- Rim diameter: 11.9 mm (0.47 in)
- Rim thickness: 1.3 mm (0.051 in)
- Case length: 56.8 mm (2.24 in)
- Overall length: 81.0 mm (3.19 in)
- Rifling twist: 350–400 mm (1 in 14–16 inches)
- Primer type: Large rifle

Ballistic performance
Bullet mass/type	Velocity	Energy
13.3 g (205 gr) SP	739 m/s (2,420 ft/s)	3,636 J (2,682 ft⋅lbf)
15.9 g (245 gr) SP	660 m/s (2,200 ft/s)	3,420 J (2,520 ft⋅lbf)
17.8 g (275 gr) SP	560 m/s (1,800 ft/s)	2,830 J (2,090 ft⋅lbf)
18.2 g (281 gr) SP	590 m/s (1,900 ft/s)	3,098 J (2,285 ft⋅lbf)
- Test barrel length: 600 mm (24 in); Source(s): Cartridges Of The World

The 9×57mm Mauser is a cartridge based on the 7.92×57mm Mauser. It uses the identical 57 mm-long cartridge case, with the same shoulder angle, but necked up to accept a 9 mm-diameter bullet. Ballistically - but not dimensionally - it is indistinguishable from the 9×56mm Mannlicher–Schoenauer. It is currently regarded as a semi-obsolete calibre, although hand-loading keeps it alive.

== Performance ==
Firing a relatively heavy bullet of 14–16 g (220–250 grains) at a modest velocity of 670–700 m/s (2,200–2,300 ft/s), the 9×57mm is low in noise and recoil, pleasant to shoot, and regarded as accurate and effective on all but the very largest, most dangerous game at distances out to 250–300 m (300-350 yd).

The cartridge's low velocity combined with the heavy, poorly streamlined bullet, gives the 9×57 a relatively poor trajectory, which makes it unsuited to shooting at longer ranges. This calibre was popular as a large-deer cartridge in Germany and Central Europe; and also in German spheres of influence in Africa in the early 20th century, such as German West Africa and German East Africa, where it was widely popular among European farmers and settlers for shooting plains game. It also accounted for many lions and leopards. Its popularity was gradually eclipsed by the significantly more powerful, flatter-shooting, 9.3×62 Mauser cartridge. The CIP maximum average pressure (MAP) for the 9×57 is 280 MPa bar (40,600 PSI).

== Firearms using 9×57mm Mauser ==
Many sporting rifles in 9×57mm caliber, often dating from well before 1939 are still used for hunting today. However, dependable, recently manufactured factory ammunition is increasingly expensive and hard to obtain, and many users must rely on handloading.

Many of these Mauser rifles were made from de-militarized World War I small ring M98 rifles by many gunsmiths throughout Germany, and usually these are rebored (oversized from 7.92×57mm). When barrels eventually wear out, 9×57mm rifles are generally rebarrelled in other, more modern calibres.

The cartridge was popular around the world and was even chambered in Remington Model 30 and Winchester Model 54 rifles.

== Commercial production ==
The Eley-Kynoch 9×57 cartridge manufactured by the company at its Birmingham, England factory up to the 1950s used fully jacketed and soft-nosed, round-nosed, flat-based bullets weighing 16.1 grams (248 gr), with an average muzzle velocity of 690 m/s (2,300 ft/s). Factory-loaded ammunition is now increasingly hard to come by, and most users handload, using either fire-formed 9×57 brass or modified 7×57 or 8×57 cases necked up to accept 9 mm diameter bullets.

== Gallery ==
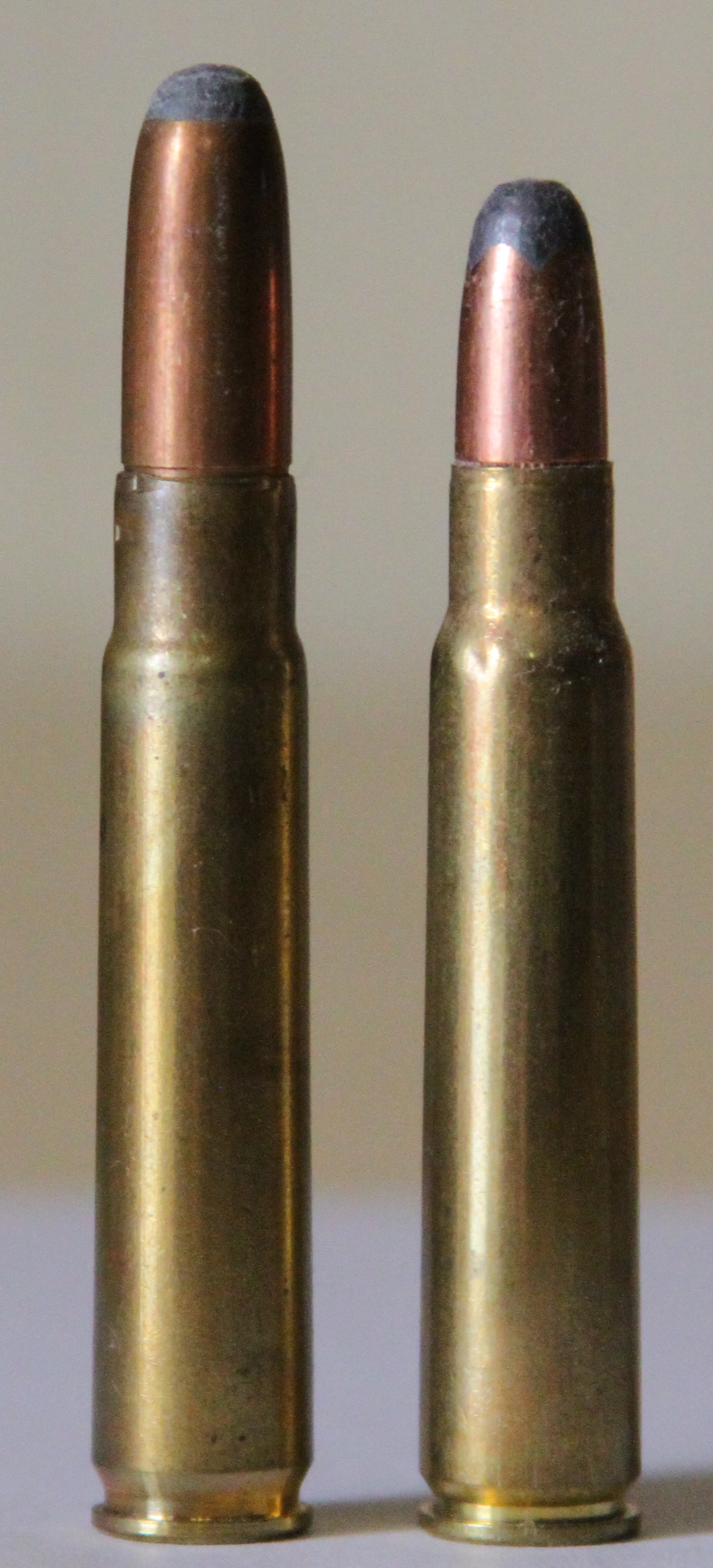
9×57mm Mauser cartridge next to a sporting 7.92×57mm Mauser cartridge, its parent case.

== See also ==
- List of rifle cartridges
- Table of handgun and rifle cartridges
- 9 mm caliber
- 9.3 x 57mm Mauser
