= 7.92×57mm Mauser =

German military rifle cartridge

7.92×57mm Mauser, 8×57mm (IS or Mauser)
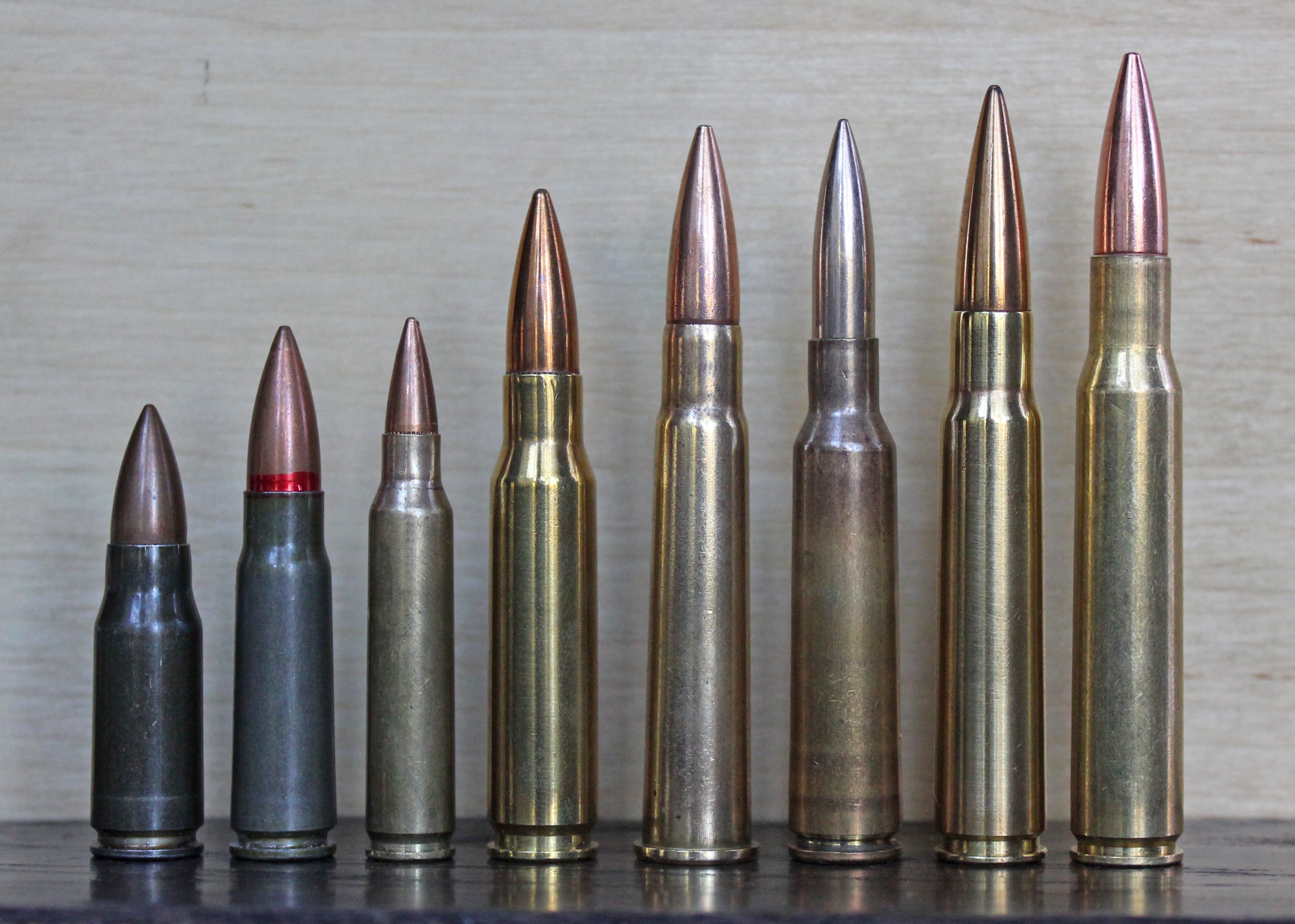
- From left to right 7.92×33mm Kurz, 7.62×39mm, 5.56×45mm NATO, 7.62×51mm NATO, .303 British, 6.5×55mm Swedish, 7.92×57mm Mauser, and .30-06 Springfield military cartridges
- Type: Rifle
- Place of origin: German Empire

Service history
- In service: 1905–present
- Used by: Germany, United Kingdom, Czechoslovakia, Spain, Poland, China, Dominican Republic, Yugoslavia, Ottoman Empire, Turkey, Iran, Egypt, and many other countries
- Wars: World War I, World War II, and numerous others

Production history
- Designer: German Rifle Testing Commission
- Designed: 1903
- Produced: 1903–present
- Variants: 8×57mm IRS (rimmed)

Specifications
- Parent case: M/88
- Case type: Rimless, bottleneck
- Bullet diameter: 8.22 mm (0.324 in)
- Land diameter: 7.92 mm (0.312 in) or 7.89 mm (0.311 in)
- Neck diameter: 9.08 mm (0.357 in)
- Shoulder diameter: 10.95 mm (0.431 in)
- Base diameter: 11.94 mm (0.470 in)
- Rim diameter: 11.95 mm (0.470 in)
- Rim thickness: 1.30 mm (0.051 in)
- Case length: 57.00 mm (2.244 in)
- Overall length: 82.00 mm (3.228 in)
- Case capacity: 4.09 cm^{3} (63.1 gr H_{2}O)
- Rifling twist: 240 mm (1 in 9.45 in)
- Primer type: Large rifle
- Maximum pressure (C.I.P.): 390.0 MPa (56,560 psi)
- Maximum pressure (SAAMI): 241.3 MPa (35,000 psi)
- Maximum CUP: 37,000 CUP

Ballistic performance
Bullet mass/type	Velocity	Energy
11.7 g (181 gr) RWS DK	820 m/s (2,700 ft/s)	3,934 J (2,902 ft⋅lbf)
12.1 g (187 gr) RWS HMK	820 m/s (2,700 ft/s)	4,068 J (3,000 ft⋅lbf)
12.7 g (196 gr) RWS TMR	800 m/s (2,600 ft/s)	4,064 J (2,997 ft⋅lbf)
12.8 g (198 gr) RWS ID Classic	800 m/s (2,600 ft/s)	4,096 J (3,021 ft⋅lbf)
9.0 g (139 gr) RWS EVO GREEN	920 m/s (3,000 ft/s)	3,809 J (2,809 ft⋅lbf)
- Test barrel length: 600 mm (23.62 in); Source: RWS / RUAG Ammotech

The 7.92×57mm Mauser (designated as the 8mm Mauser or 8×57mm by the SAAMI and 8 × 57 IS by the C.I.P.) is a rimless bottlenecked rifle cartridge. The 7.92×57mm Mauser cartridge was adopted by the German Empire in 1903–1905, and was the German service cartridge in both World Wars. In the first half of the 20th century, the 7.92×57mm Mauser cartridge was one of the world's most popular military cartridges. In the 21st century, it is a popular civilian sport and hunting cartridge in the West.

== Development ==
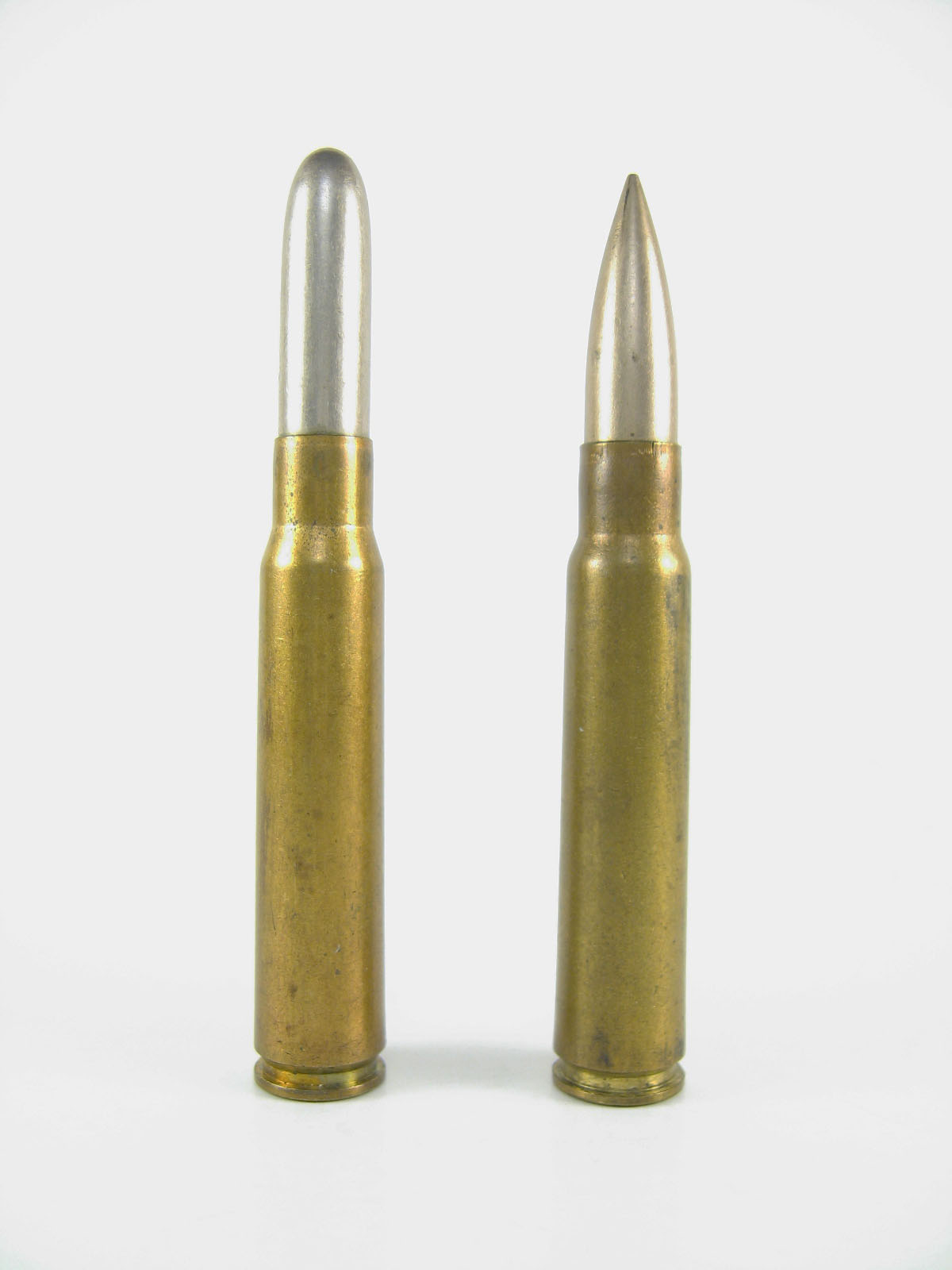
1888 pattern M/88 (left) parent cartridge alongside the 1903 pattern 7.92×57mm Mauser S Patrone.

=== Parent cartridge Patrone 88 ===
The parent cartridge, upon which the 7.92×57mm Mauser is based, was adopted by Germany in 1888 as the Patrone 88 (cartridge 88) or M/88 (along with the Gewehr 1888 service rifle). It was a first-generation smokeless propellant cartridge designed by the German Gewehr-Prüfungskommission (lit. 'Rifle Testing Commission', abbreviated to G.P.K.), as the new smokeless propellant introduced as Poudre B in the 1886 pattern 8mm Lebel had started a military rifle ammunition revolution. The M/88 cartridge was loaded with 2.75 g (42.4 gr) of single-base (based on nitrocellulose) smokeless powder and a relatively heavy, 14.7 g (227 gr), round-nosed ball bullet with a diameter of 8.08 mm (0.318 in). The M/88 bore originally had 7.90 mm (0.311 in) lands diameter and 8.10 mm (0.319 in) grooves diameter. The M/88 barrel bore specification was changed by 1894–1895 to 7.90 mm (0.311 in) lands diameter and 8.20 mm (0.323 in) grooves diameter to improve accuracy and reduce barrel wear in M/88 chambered arms.

=== 8mm S Patrone ===
German government driven efforts to further improve on the performance of the military M/88 ammunition and the service arms in which the M/88 was used after several development steps eventually resulted in the official adoption on 3 April 1903 by the G.P.K. of the dimensionally redesigned 7.92×57mm Mauser chambering. Besides the chambering, the bore (designated as "S-bore") was also dimensionally redesigned because the new bullet with a shorter cylindrical part had reduced bearing surface, which necessitated increasing its diameter and deepening barrel grooves (as a result the new cartridge was not fully interchangeable with the old one).

The 1903 pattern S Patrone (S ball cartridge) was loaded with a lighter 9.9 grams (153 gr), pointed Spitzgeschoß of 8.2 mm (0.323 in) diameter and more powerful double-base (based on nitrocellulose and nitroglycerin) smokeless powder resulting in nearly 38% higher muzzle velocity and 27% more muzzle energy. The operating pressure was 300 MPa (43,511 psi). With the improved ballistic coefficient – (G1 BC) of approximately 0.321 to 0.337 (ballistic coefficients are somewhat debatable) – of the new bullet, the 1903 pattern cartridge had an improved maximum effective range and a flatter trajectory, and was therefore less critical of range estimation compared to the M/88 cartridge.

In the German military service the Patrone 88 was replaced in 1904 and 1905 by the S Patrone. Many arms originally chambered for the Patrone 88 could be and were adapted for chambering the S Patrone by reaming out metal from the chamber as it required a wider chamber throat to take the differently shaped and thicker brass of the new S Patrone. Other military arms chambered for different 8 mm cartridges were also converted to the S-Patrone.

The rimless cartridge case has been used as the parent case for several other necked-down and necked-up cartridges, and as the 8x57IS, has produced a rimmed variant, the 8x57IRS, which has also been used as a parent case for other cartridges with varying necked up or down diameters.

== Military use ==
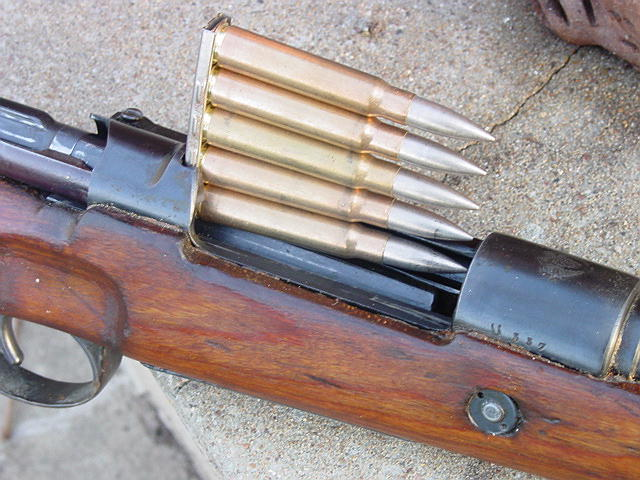
Karabiner 98k stripper clip with brass-cased 7.92×57mm ammunition

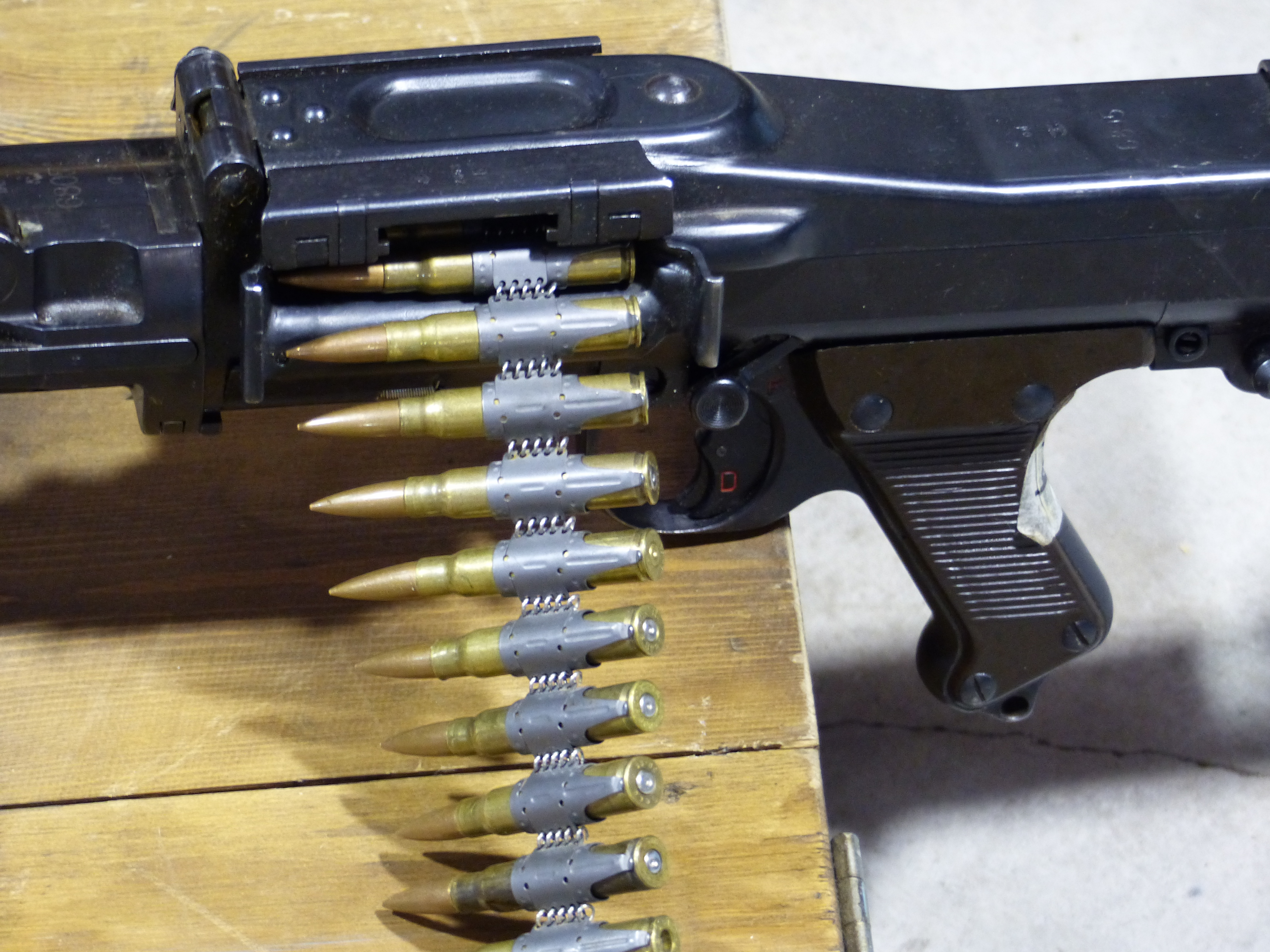
MG 34 with inserted 7.92×57mm Gurt 34 ammunition belt

Due to restrictions imposed by the Treaty of Versailles, the Germans were not able to develop or sell any military equipment after World War I. In the post-war years, 7.92×57mm Mauser chambered Gewehr 98 pattern rifles were produced in Belgium, Czechoslovakia, Poland, Mexico, Austria and China. This, and the cartridge's high performance and versatility, led to the 7.92×57mm Mauser being adopted by the armed forces of various governments. These included: Spain, Poland, Czechoslovakia, Romania, Iran, Turkey, China, Egypt, Yugoslavia, former German African colonies. This made the round the most widely used military rifle cartridge in the world during the inter-war years.

During World War II it was one of the few cartridges used by both the Axis and Allied powers, a distinction that it shared with the 9×19mm Parabellum pistol round. Apart from being the standard rifle cartridge of the German and Polish armed forces, it was also used by the armed forces of the United Kingdom in the Besa machine gun, which was mounted in some of their tanks and other armoured vehicles, as well as being extensively used by the Chinese, especially early in the war. After World War II, it was used by the early Bundeswehr of West Germany. It saw limited uses by the various (police and paramilitary) units in East Germany before being completely phased out of service in the 1960s. Later, when Egypt decided to manufacture the Hakim rifle, a licensed copy of the Swedish Ag m/42, they redesigned the breech to accept the 7.92×57mm Mauser cartridge rather than use the original 6.5×55mm Ag m/42 cartridge. Its military use continues today (2012) in some former Yugoslavia republics. The Zastava M76 sniper rifle, M48 bolt-action rifle and the license-built copy of the MG 42, the M53 Šarac machine gun use this cartridge.

Rifles formerly manufactured for the Wehrmacht, which were captured by the Allies and acquired by Israel were important in the 1948 Arab–Israeli War. Israel did not have a domestic arms industry and could not manufacture rifles but it could produce replacement parts and refurbish weapons. Israel only used its Mauser rifles in their original configuration for a short period; when NATO countries adopted a standard rifle cartridge, the 7.62×51mm NATO, Israel replaced all 7.92×57mm Mauser barrels on its Mauser rifles with barrels chambered for the new 7.62×51mm NATO cartridge.

== Civilian use ==
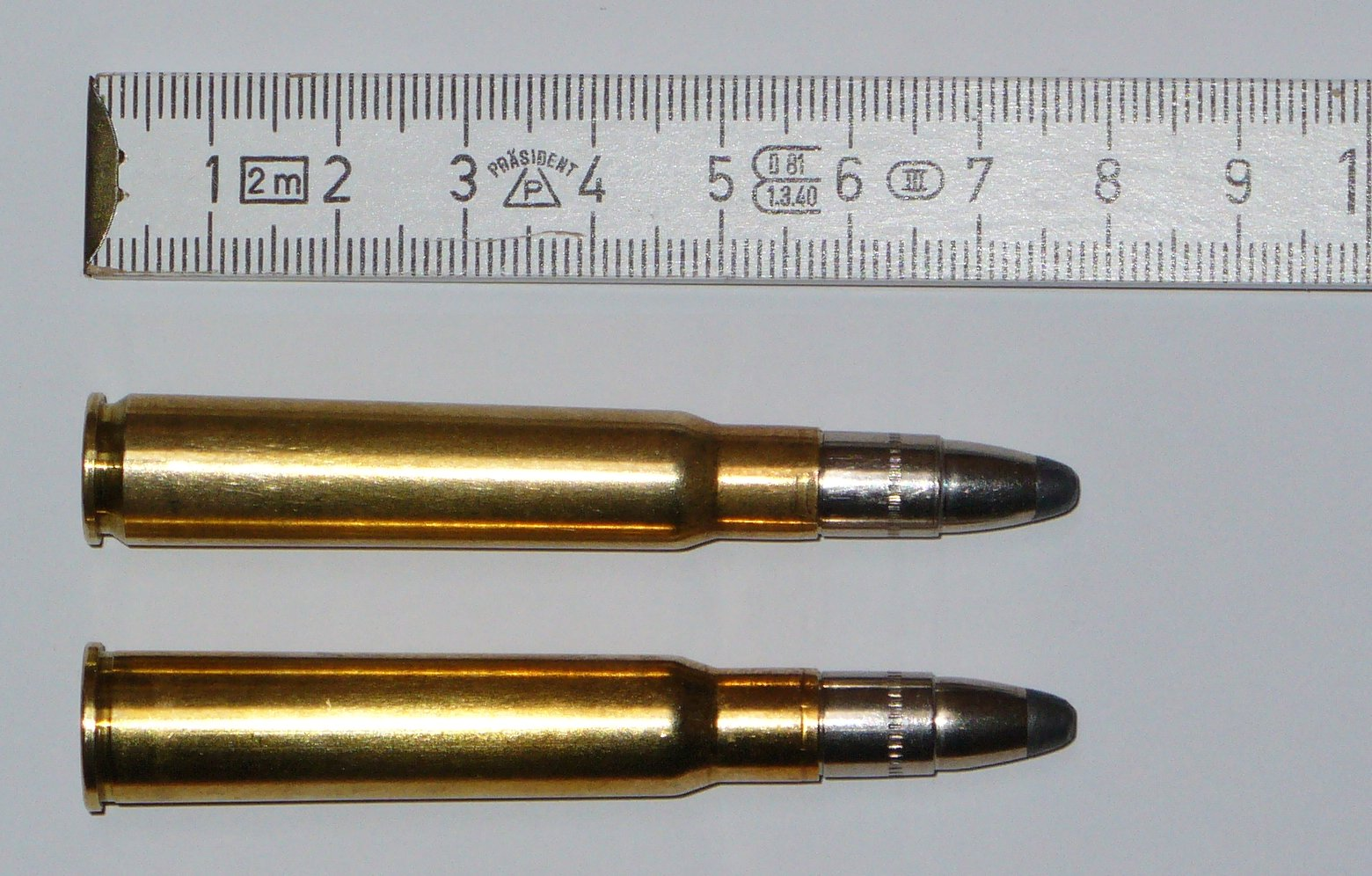
7.92×57mm Mauser (above) and the rimmed 8×57mm IRS cartridges loaded with Brenneke TIG hunting bullets

After World War I the Treaty of Versailles imposed comprehensive and complex restrictions upon the post-war German armed forces (the Reichswehr). According to the treaty the Reichswehr could, on a limited scale, continue using the 7.92×57mm Mauser as their service cartridge. The Treaty of Versailles however effectively ended the civilian use of 7.92×57mm Mauser chambered rifles by German hunters and sport shooters. During the mid-1930s Germany stopped obeying the restrictions imposed by the Treaty of Versailles and gradually the civilian use of 7.92×57mm Mauser chambered rifles by German hunters and sport shooters was resumed. In 1939 the Normalisierungsverordnung ("Normalization regulation") effectively prohibited the production of non S-bore/7.92×57mm Mauser chambered arms in Nazi Germany. In post-World War II Germany, the production of the various preceding chamberings was allowed again, but these chamberings have become rare in post-1939 produced arms.

The 7.92×57mm Mauser is a common chambering offering in rifles marketed for European and North American sportsmen, alongside broadly similar cartridges such as the 5.6×57mm, 6.5×55mm, 6.5×57mm, and the 6.5×68mm and 8×68mm S magnum hunting cartridges. Major European manufacturers like Zastava Arms, Blaser, Česká Zbrojovka, Heym, Mauser Jagdwaffen GmbH, and Steyr Mannlicher produce factory new 7.92×57mm Mauser hunting rifles, and European ammunition manufacturers like Blaser, Lapua, RUAG Ammotec/RWS, Prvi Partizan, Sako and Sellier & Bellot produce factory new ammunition. In 2004 Remington Arms offered a limited-edition Model 700 Classic bolt action hunting rifle chambered for the 7.92×57mm Mauser.

The 7.92×57mm Mauser cartridge's performance makes it suitable for hunting all medium-sized game such as the deer family, chamois, mouflon, bighorn sheep, wild boar, and bear. The 7.92×57mm Mauser can offer very good penetrating ability due to a fast twist rate that enables it to fire long, heavy bullets with a high sectional density.

The 7.92×57mm Mauser cannot be used in countries that ban civil use of former or current military rifle cartridges, though since 2013 the cartridge is no longer restricted in France.

The rimmed variant of the 7.92×57mm Mauser, the 8×57mm IRS, was developed later for break-action rifles and combination guns. The 8×57mm IRS is commercially offered as a chambering option in European break-action rifles.

== Cartridge naming ==
The naming of this cartridge is cultural and epoch dependent and hence not uniform around the world.

The 7.92×57mm Mauser cartridge is also known by the following designations:

- 7.9, 7.9mm
- 7.9 Mauser, 7.9mm Mauser
- 7.92, 7.92mm
- 7.92 Mauser, 7.92mm Mauser
- Cartridge SA, 7.92
- 7.92×57, 7.92×57mm
- 7.92×57 Mauser, 7.92×57mm Mauser
- 8mm Mauser
- 8×57, 8×57mm
- 8×57 Mauser, 8×57mm Mauser
- 8 × 57 IS, 8 × 57 JS

This list is not conclusive and other nomenclature or designation variations might be encountered.

The 7.92 naming convention is often used by English speaking sources for the military issued 7.92×57mm Mauser and 7.92×33mm Kurz cartridges. Remarkably, both the 7.92 and 7,9 used in these and alike designations do not exactly comply to the actual C.I.P. or SAAMI cartridge, chamber and bore dimensions. All other non-military issued rimless and rimmed rifle cartridges originating from Germany having approximately 8 mm bullet diameter are connected to 8 mm namings.

The widespread use in German military Gewehr 98 and Karabiner 98k service rifles designed and manufactured by Mauser caused the "Mauser" tag, though the Mauser company had nothing to do with the development of this cartridge.

The letter "J" often mentioned by English speaking sources is actually an "I" for Infanterie (German for "infantry"). A stamped "I" at the cartridge bottom in writing styles used in the past in Germany could be easily mistaken for a "J". Even in the 21st century the "I" is often substituted by a "J" in English speaking communities and German ammunition manufacturers often write "JS" instead of "IS" to avoid confusing customers. The letter "S" stands for Spitzgeschoß ("pointed bullet"), and the English designation "spitzer" for that style of bullet is derived from this German term.

=== Current European civil C.I.P. designation ===
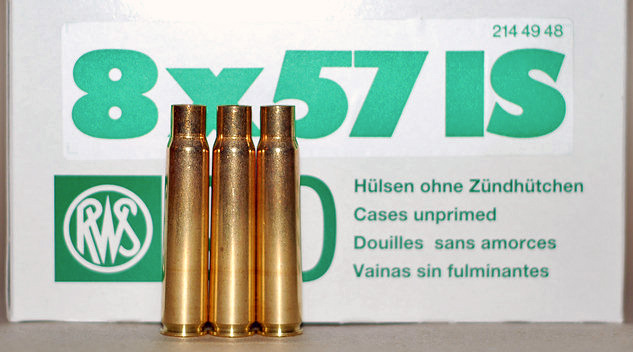
German made unprimed cases with their packaging box displaying the C.I.P. 8 × 57 IS cartridge designation.

The mainly European arms standards body Commission Internationale Permanente pour l'Epreuve des Armes à Feu Portatives (Permanent International Commission for portable firearms testing) (C.I.P.)—an organisation for standards in ammunition for civilian use—currently (2012) designates the 7.92×57mm Mauser as the 8 × 57 IS. This designation has the power of law for civil use in C.I.P. member states like the United Kingdom.

=== Current U.S. civil SAAMI designations ===
The United States standardizing body for sporting cartridges Sporting Arms and Ammunition Manufacturers' Institute (SAAMI) currently (2012) designates the 7.92×57mm Mauser cartridge as the 8mm Mauser, also known as 8×57mm.

=== Historic military designations ===
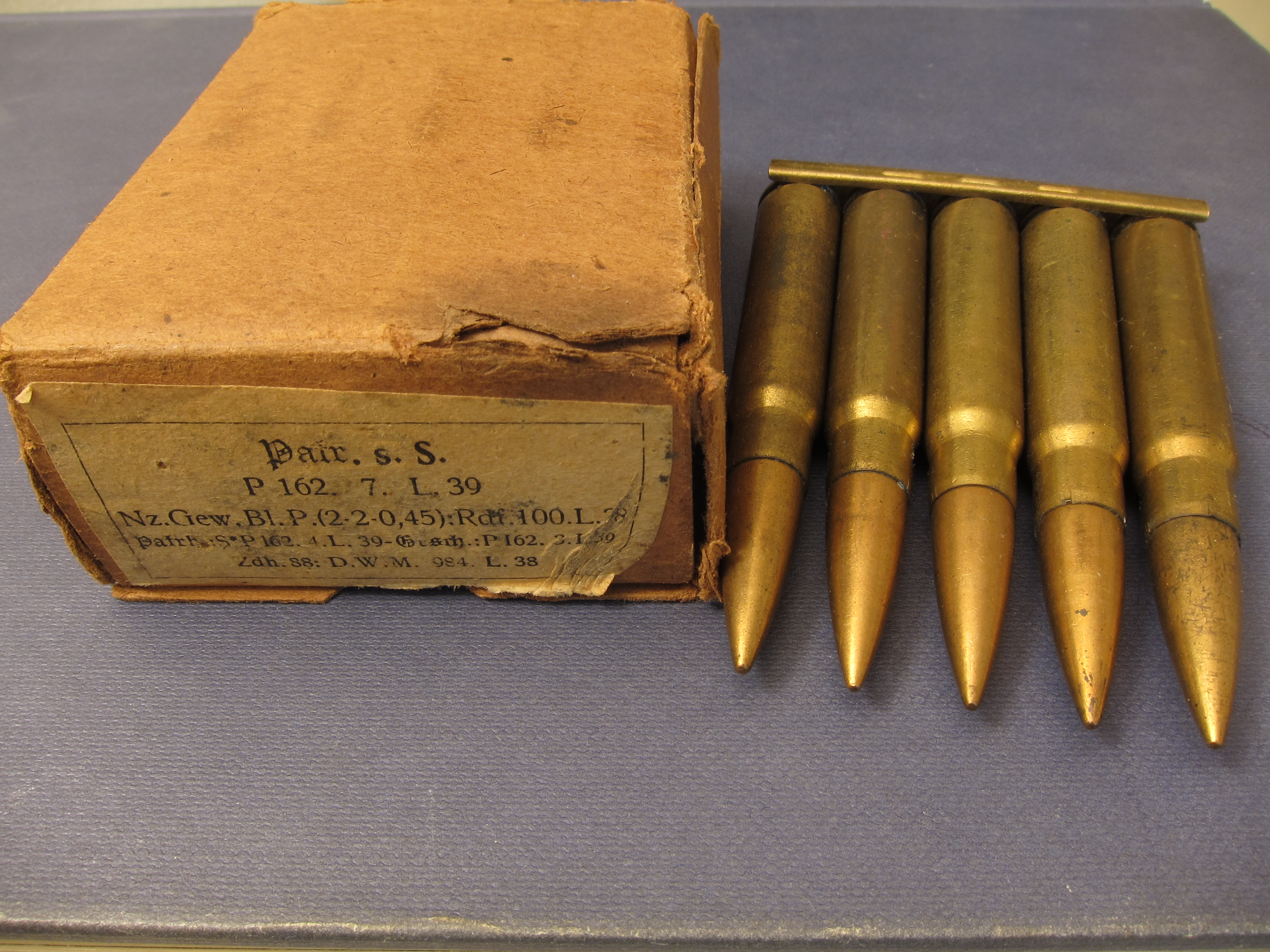
Ammunition box and stripper clip with five brass cased s.S. (ball-type load) cartridges produced for the German military in July 1939

The German military used 7,9mm as designation or omitted any diameter reference and only printed the exact type of loading on ammunition boxes during World War II.

In Sweden the cartridge was designated "8mm patron m/39"

The Polish military used 7,9mm or 7,92mm designations (mostly 7,9mm). The Norwegian military used the designation 7,92×57 mm, sometimes "7,92 Lett" ("lett" meaning light) to differentiate it from the similar but not interchangeable 7,92×61 Tung (heavy). Ammunition produced by Raufoss after the war was designated 7,92×57.

The British military's Besa machine gun was chambered for the 7.92×57mm Mauser, and was used in armoured vehicles during World War II. The British referred to this ammunition as Cartridge SA, 7.92.

United States intelligence documents from World War II refer to the cartridge as 7.92 or 7.92 mm or 7.92-mm.

== Cartridge drawings and dimensions ==
The 7.92×57mm Mauser cartridge has a cartridge case capacity of 4.09 ml (63 grains) H_{2}O. The exterior shape of the case was designed to promote reliable case feeding and extraction in bolt-action rifles and machine guns alike, under extreme conditions.

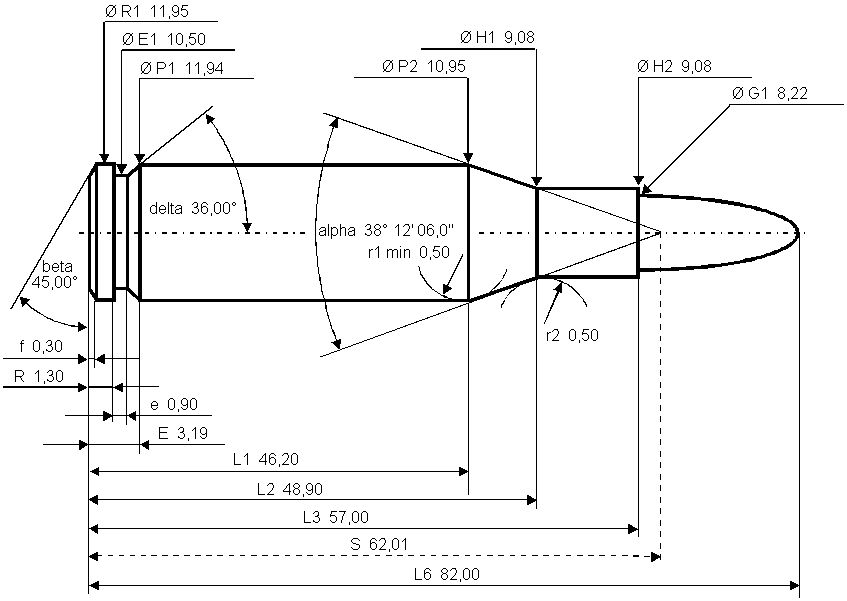

7.92×57mm Mauser maximum C.I.P. cartridge dimensions. All sizes in millimeters.

Americans would define the shoulder angle at alpha/2 ≈ 19.1 degrees. The common rifling twist rate for this cartridge is 240 mm (1 in 9.45 in), 4 grooves, Ø of the lands = 7.89 mm (0.311 in), Ø grooves = 8.20 mm (0.323 in), land width = 4.40 mm (0.173 in) and the primer type is large rifle.

According to the official C.I.P. (Commission Internationale Permanente pour l'Epreuve des Armes à Feu Portatives) rulings the 7.92×57mm Mauser can handle up to 390.00 MPa (56,565 psi) P_{max} piezo pressure. In C.I.P. regulated countries every rifle cartridge combo has to be proofed at 125% of this maximum C.I.P. pressure to certify for sale to consumers. This means that 7.92×57mm Mauser chambered arms in C.I.P. regulated countries are currently (2013) proof tested at 487.50 MPa (70,706 psi) PE piezo pressure.

The SAAMI (voluntary) Maximum Average Pressure (MAP) for this cartridge is 35,000 psi (241.3 MPa) piezo pressure or (37,000 CUP). This is considerably lower than the C.I.P. pressure limit and is done for liability reasons, in case a 7.92×57mm Mauser "S-bore" cartridge is fired in an "I-bore" rifle that has a narrower throat and barrel diameter. Most European ammunition manufacturers load to a lower C.I.P. pressure limit - 380.00 MPa (55,114 psi) P_{max} piezo pressure for the 8×57mm I civilian Patrone 88 offspring - for I-bore cartridges and use 8.08 to 8.09 mm (0.318 to 0.319 in) diameter projectiles; while the US based manufacturer Hornady followed their lead in their (now discontinued) EuroSpec brand 8×57 JS load.

== German military ammunition ==
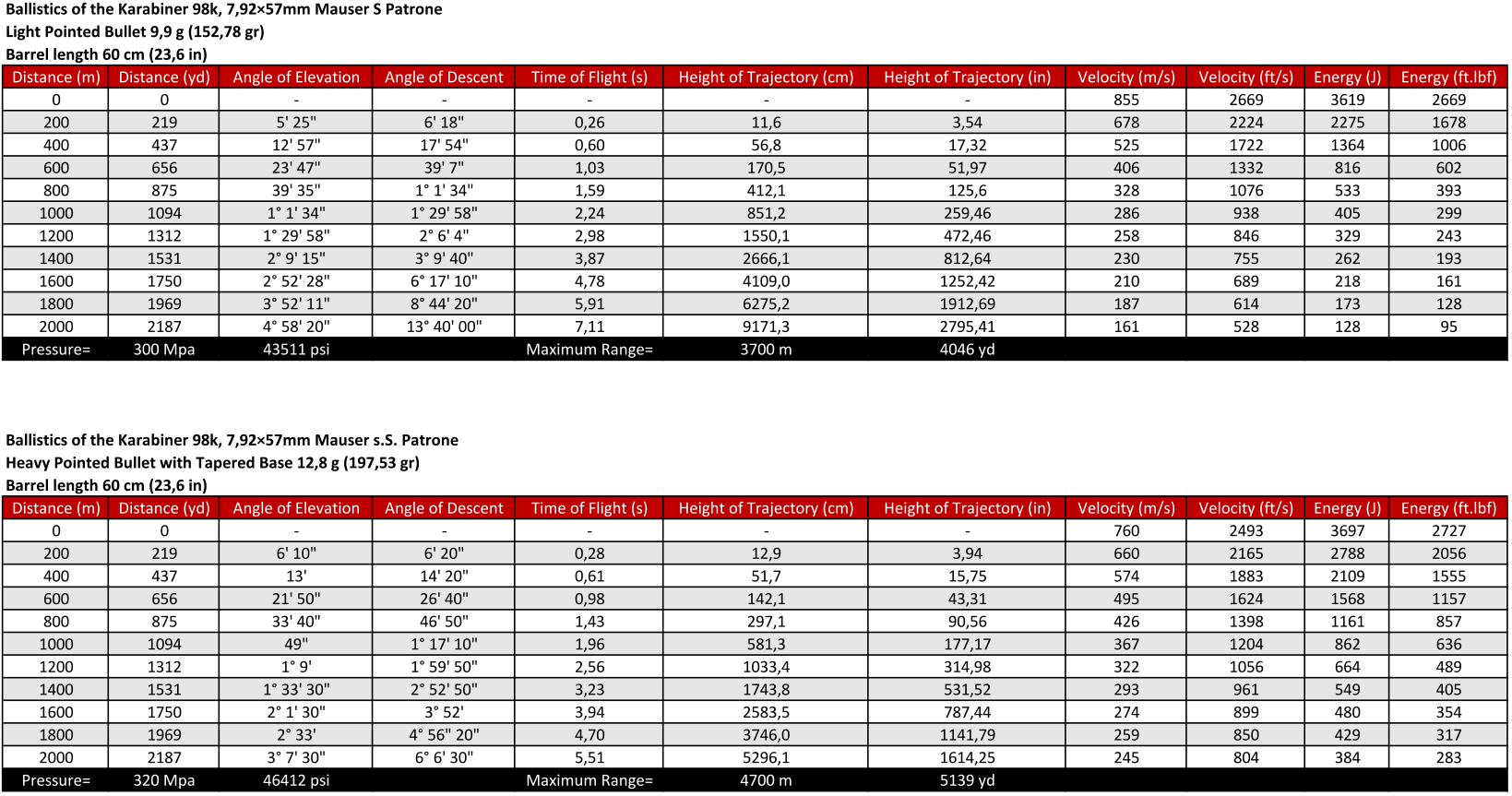
Ballistic tables for the S Patrone and the s.S. Patrone fired from a 600 mm (23.6 in) barrel.

Germany produced many military versions of the cartridge, and continued the development of different variations until the end of World War II. The bullet lengths substantially varied between the different cartridge types, but all were loaded to an overall length of 80.6 mm (3.17 in). The Germans had started using steel cases in World War I, and by the end of 1943, most German ammunition had that type of case. The weights and case capacities of the World War II military cartridge cases varied somewhat. The German military ammunition manufacturer Polte produced brass cartridge cases weighing 10.32 g (159 gr) with 4.03 ml (62 gr) H_{2}O case capacity and steel cartridge cases weighing 10.90 g (168 gr) with 3.95 ml (61 gr) H_{2}O case capacity. The steel cartridge cases were produced in copper plated and lacquered executions. Some military cartridge cases were made with the aim to use less material and their ammunition boxes were marked Für Gewehr ("for rifle") use. Other military cartridge cases were made extra sturdy and their ammunition boxes were marked Für MG ("for machine gun") use.

=== German military standard ball service rifle cartridge evolution ===
7.92×57mm Mauser German military standard-issue rifle cartridges
Name	Year	Caliber	Bullet mass	Length	Rim	Base	Shoulder	Neck	OAL	Muzzle velocity	Muzzle energy	Operating pressure
M/88	1888	8.07 mm (0.318 in)	14.6 g (225.3 gr)	57 mm (2.2 in)	11.95 mm (0.470 in)	11.94 mm (0.470 in)	10.95 mm (0.431 in)	8.99 mm (0.354 in)	80.6 mm (3.17 in)	639 m/s (2,096 ft/s)	2,983 joules (2,200 ft⋅lbf)	?
S Patrone	1903	8.2 mm (0.323 in)	9.9 g (152.8 gr)	57 mm (2.2 in)	11.95 mm (0.470 in)	11.94 mm (0.470 in)	10.95 mm (0.431 in)	9.08 mm (0.357 in)	80.6 mm (3.17 in)	878 m/s (2,881 ft/s)	3,816 joules (2,815 ft⋅lbf)	300 MPa (43,511 psi)
s.S. Patrone	1933	8.2 mm (0.323 in)	12.8 g (197.5 gr)	57 mm (2.2 in)	11.95 mm (0.470 in)	11.94 mm (0.470 in)	10.95 mm (0.431 in)	9.08 mm (0.357 in)	80.6 mm (3.17 in)	760 m/s (2,493 ft/s)	3,697 joules (2,727 ft⋅lbf)	320 MPa (46,412 psi)
S.m.E. (mild steel core)	1940	8.2 mm (0.323 in)	11.55 g (178.2 gr)	57 mm (2.2 in)	11.95 mm (0.470 in)	11.94 mm (0.470 in)	10.95 mm (0.431 in)	9.08 mm (0.357 in)	80.6 mm (3.17 in)	790 m/s (2,592 ft/s)	3,604 joules (2,658 ft⋅lbf)	310 MPa (44,962 psi)
The data for the M/88 and the 7.92×57mm Mauser S Patrone of 1905 is for Gewehr 98 rifles with 740 mm (29.1 in) barrel length. The data for the 7.92×57mm Mauser s.S. Patrone of 1934 and S.m.E. are for Karabiner 98k rifles with 600 mm (23.6 in) barrel length.

=== German cartridge variants during World War II ===
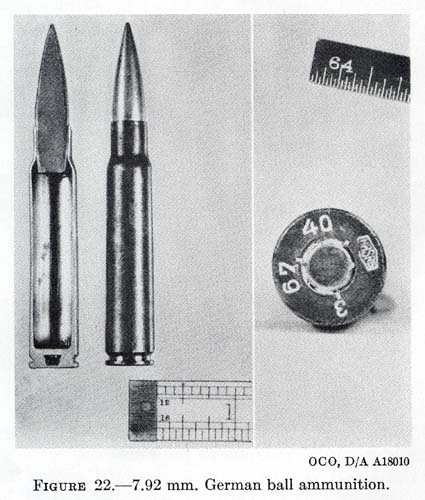
German 7.92 mm s.S. 12.8 g (198 gr) Full Metal Jacket Boat-Tail round

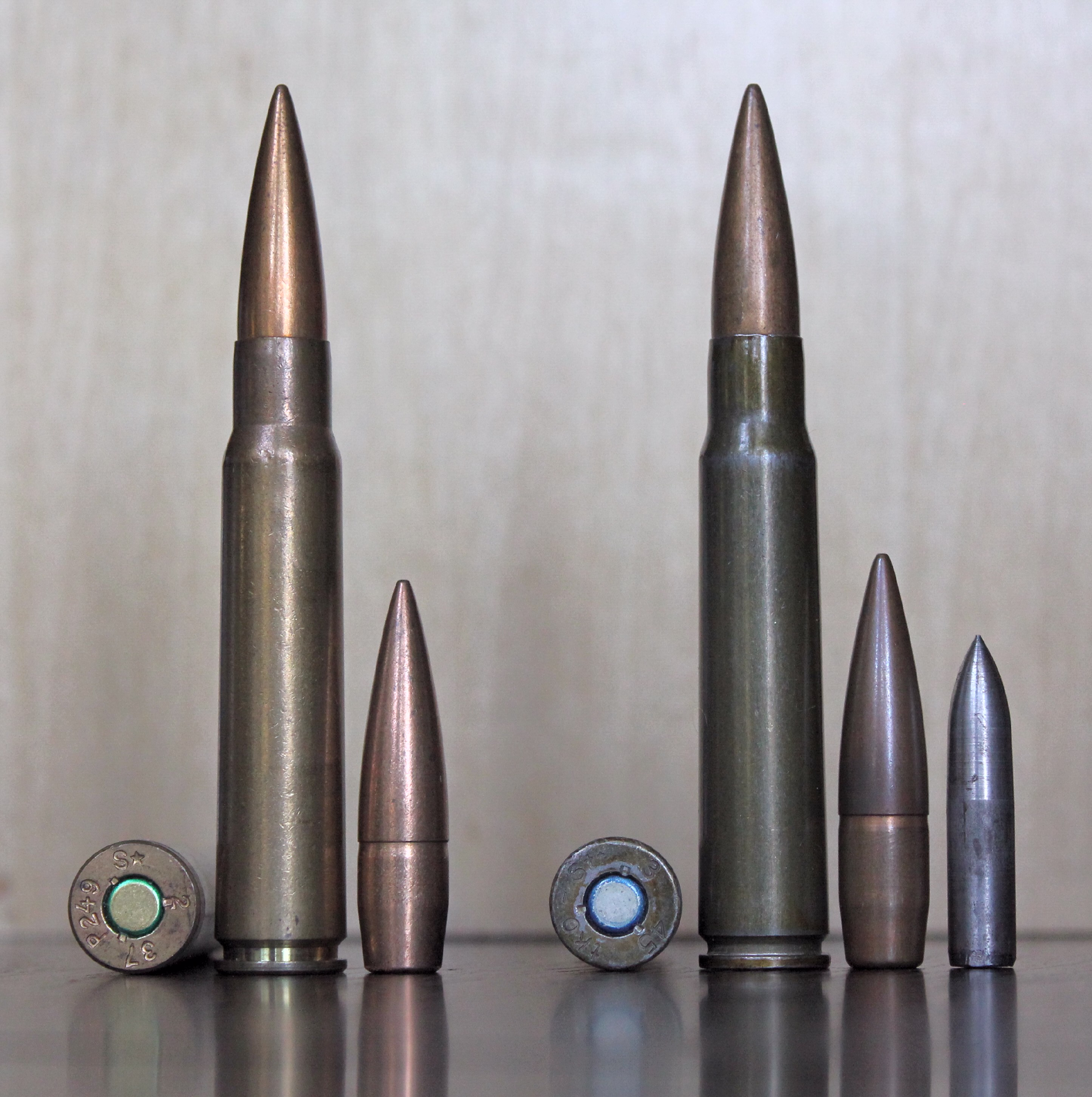
Left 7.9 mm s.S. and right S.m.E. ammunition beside their boat-tailed projectiles

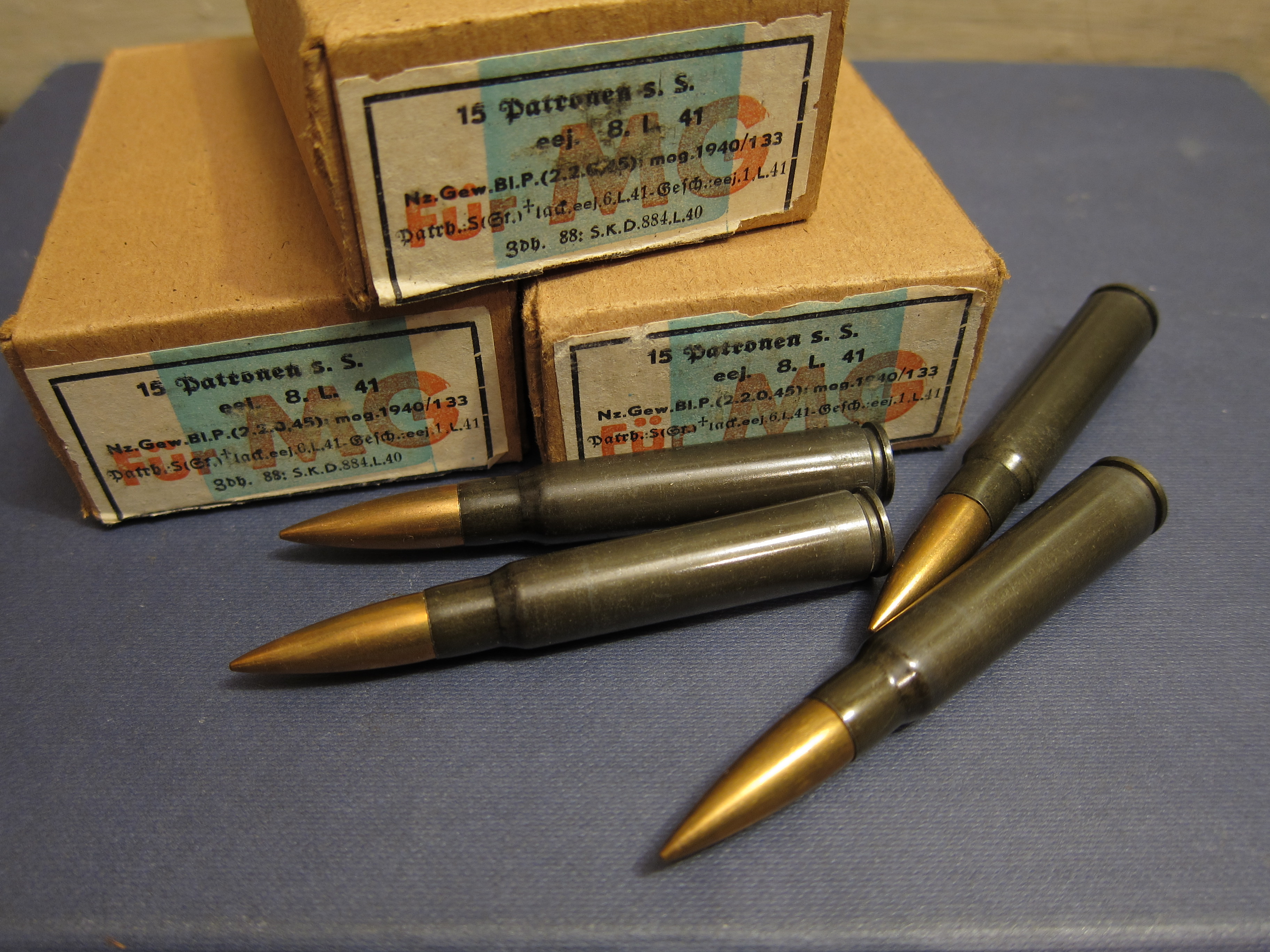
Steel lacquered cased German s.S. ball ammunition produced in 1941

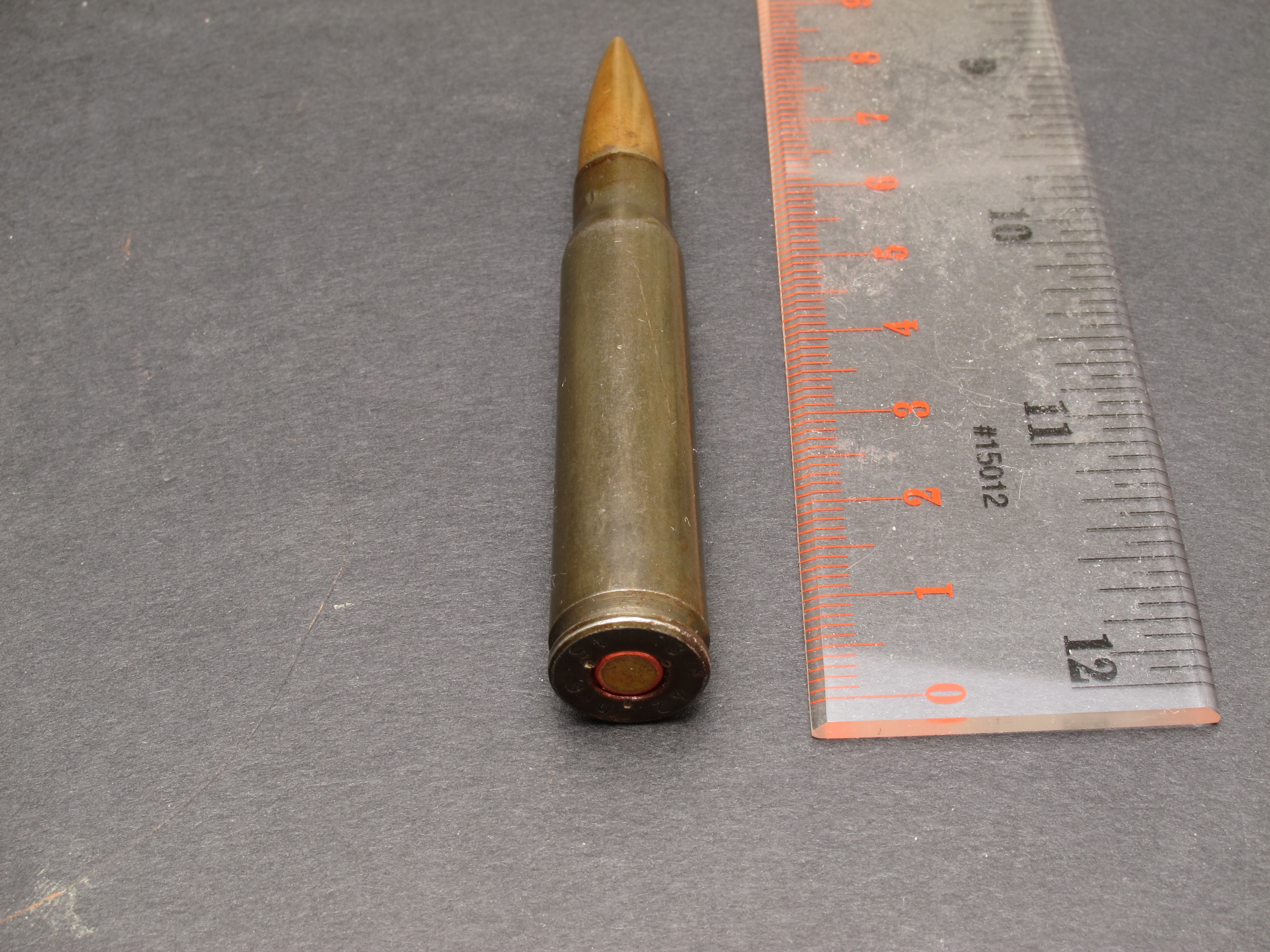
Spitzgeschoß mit Kern, yellow bullet, and red primer sealant

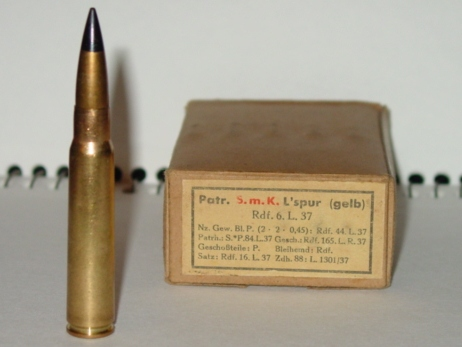
S.m.K. L'spur - Spitzgeschoß mit Kern Leuchtspur, red circular groove, black bullet point tracer ammunition

The German standard s.S. Patrone ("s.S. ball cartridge") was originally designed for long range machine gun use. It was loaded with a 35.3 mm (1.39 in) long, boat-tailed, s.S. - schweres Spitzgeschoß ("heavy pointed or spitzer bullet") full metal jacket bullet and very well made. It was lead filled, had a gilding-metal-plated jacket, and weighed 12.8 grams (197.53 gr). The s.S. Patrone had a muzzle velocity of 760 m/s (2,493 ft/s) fired from a 600 millimetres (23.62 in) long barrel and an operating pressure of 320 MPa (46,412 psi). From a 740 millimetres (29.13 in) long barrel the muzzle velocity increased to 785 m/s (2,575 ft/s). From its 1914 introduction the s.S. Patrone was mainly issued for aerial combat and as of 1918 in the later stages of World War I to infantry machine gunners. The desire for adopting new shorter barreled rifles and the introduction of the Karabiner 98k were reasons for changing the standard German service ball rifle cartridge. The 1903 pattern 7.92×57mm Mauser S Patrone produced excessive muzzle flash when fired from arms that did not have a long barrel like the Gewehr 98. It was found that the s.S. Patrone, originally designed for long range machine gun use, produced less muzzle flash out of rifles that had a shorter barrel and also provided better accuracy. Because of this the S Patrone was phased out in 1933 and the s.S. Patrone became the standard German service ball cartridge in the 1930s when the German rearmament program started. The s.S. ball projectile with a 5.9 millimetres (0.23 in) long 6° 25′ 51″ boat tail was designed for long range use and offered the best aerodynamic efficiency and external ballistic performance of any standard rifle bullet used during World War II, with a G1 ballistic coefficient between 0.593 and 0.557 (ballistic coefficients are somewhat debatable) or a ballistic coefficient of approximately 0.295 (G7). When fired at the typical muzzle velocity of 760 m/s (2,493 ft/s) out of a 600 mm (23.6 in) barrel the s.S. bullet retained supersonic velocity up to and past 1,000 m (1,094 yd) (V_{1000} ≈ Mach 1.07) under International Standard Atmosphere conditions at sea level (air density ρ = 1.225 kg/m^{3}). Mounted to a Lafette tripod and aimed through the MG Z 34 or MG Z 40 telescopic sight, the effective range of the MG 34 and MG 42 general-purpose machine guns in long-range indirect fire support roles could be extended out to 3,500 m (3,828 yd), though plunging fire or indirect fire methods were not as commonly used by machine gunners during World War II as they were during World War I. This indirect firing method exploits the s.S. Patrone useful maximum range, that is defined by the maximum range of a small-arms projectile while still maintaining the minimum kinetic energy required to put unprotected personnel out of action, which is generally believed to be 15 kilogram-meters (147 J / 108 ft⋅lbf). The s.S. Patrone had a maximum range of approximately 4,700 m (5,140 yd). Even by contemporary (2012) standards 1000^{+} m (1,094^{+} yards) effective supersonic range is quite remarkable for a standard military rifle round. For recognition the primer sealant was green, and it had a yellow-tip marked bullet.

According to the book “Du und dein Heer"(1943) the regular s.S. projectile had the following penetration performance: 65 cm (26 in) of dry pine wood at 100 m (109 yd), 85 cm (33 in) at 400 m (437 yd), 45 cm (18 in) at 800 m (875 yd) and 20 cm (8 in) at 1,000 m (1,094 yd), 10 mm (0.39 in) of iron at 300 m (328 yd), 7 mm (0.28 in) at 550 m (601 yd), 5 mm (0.20 in) of steel at 100 m (109 yd) and 3 mm (0.12 in) at 600 m (656 yd).The penetration in wood is higher at 400 m because of the tendency of the projectile to yaw at closer range.

During World War II German snipers were issued with purpose-manufactured sniping ammunition, known as the 'effect-firing' s.S. round. The 'effect-firing' s.S. round featured an extra carefully measured propellant charge and seated an sS full-metal-jacketed boat-tail projectile of match-grade build quality, lacking usual features such as a cannelure, to further improve the already high G1 ballistic coefficient to approximately 0.595 (G1) or 0.300 (G7). The 'effect-firing' s.S. projectile had a form factor (G7 i) of 0.869, which indicates good aerodynamic efficiency and external ballistic performance for the bullet diameter.

In 1940 Germany introduced S.m.E. - Spitzgeschoß mit Eisenkern ("spitzer with iron core") — mild steel cored projectile ammunition. The S.m.E. ammunition was developed to replace the s.S. ammunition to save on lead and other metals that became scarce in Germany during World War II. The projectile core was covered by a relatively thin layer of lead. Muzzle velocity was 790 m/s (2,592 ft/s) and the operating pressure was 310 MPa (44,962 psi). For recognition the primer annulus or whole primers were colored blue. S.m.E. bullets were 37.3 mm (1.47 in) long, boat-tailed, and weighed 11.55 g (178.2 gr). The mild steel core weights varied between the four production sub-executions from 5.47 to 5.79 g (84.4 to 89.4 gr). From 1942 onwards S.m.E. ammunition practically replaced the s.S. ammunition. In 1943 the lead content of the S.m.E. bullet was further reduced. To compensate for the lead reduction the mild steel core was redesigned resulting in a projectile lengthened to 39.8 mm (1.57 in) to retain the original S.m.E. bullet weight of 11.55 g (178.2 gr). This ammunition was designated S.m.E. lg - Spitzgeschoß mit Eisenkern lang ("spitzer with iron core long") and lacked recognition marks. The S.m.E. lg external ballistic characteristics were practically identical to s.S. ammunition up to 1,400 m (1,531 yd) and the lengthened S.m.E. lg projectile was more accurate compared to the shorter S.m.E. projectile.

Special ammunition included:

S.m.K. - Spitzgeschoß mit Kern ("spitzer with core")
hardened steel cored projectile for use against targets behind thick covers, tanks, or airplanes. Red circular cap groove, yellow bullet, bullet weight 11.85 g (182.9 gr), muzzle velocity 785 m/s (2,575 ft/s), operating pressure 300 MPa (43,511 psi). This ammunition was also produced in a S.m.K.-v high-velocity or "v" ammunition variant that added 100 m/s (328 ft/s) muzzle velocity to the normal S.m.K. variant. There was also a version S.m.K.H. - Spitzgeschoß mit Hartkern ("spitzer with hardcore") which had a tungsten carbide instead of a steel core. Sintered iron and mild steel cores also came into use in this ammunition. German Spitzgeschoss mit Kern armor-piercing bullets were very good, being very stable and accurate at long ranges.
S.m.K. L'spur - Spitzgeschoß mit Kern Leuchtspur ("spitzer with core tracer")
red circular groove, black bullet point—German tracer bullets "were the best put out by any country — streamlined and with excellent ballistics". The bullet was basically the same as used in the S.m.K. ammunition but combined with a tracer that burned for 800 to 1,000 m (875 to 1,094 yd). It had a bullet weight of 10.00 g (154.3 gr) and a muzzle velocity of 810 m/s (2,657 ft/s) and an operating pressure of 280 MPa (40,611 psi). This ammunition was also produced in a S.m.K. L'spur-v high-velocity or "v" ammunition variant that added 115 m/s (377 ft/s) muzzle velocity to the normal S.m.K. L'spur variant. These rounds were also available in 'S.m.K. L'spur 100/600' and S.m.K. L'spur-v 100/600 variants for aerial use that burned between 100 and 600 m (109 and 656 yd).
S.m.K. Gl'spur - Spitzgeschoß mit Kern Glimmspur ("spitzer with core night tracer" )
red circular groove, black bullet point—German night tracer bullets. The bullet was basically the same as used in the S.m.K. ammunition but combined with a dimmed tracer that was visible from 150 m (164 yd) to 800 to 1,000 m (875 to 1,094 yd) and would not temporarily blind dark adapted eyes in low light conditions. It had a bullet weight of 10.00 g (154.3 gr) and a muzzle velocity of 810 m/s (2,657 ft/s) and an operating pressure of 280 MPa (40,611 psi). This ammunition was also produced in a S.m.K. Gl'spur-v high-velocity or "v" ammunition variant that added 115 m/s (377 ft/s) muzzle velocity to the normal S.m.K. Gl'spur variant. These rounds were also available in S.m.K. Gl'spur 100/600 and S.m.K. Gl'spur-v 100/600 variants for aerial use that burned between 100 and 600 m (109 and 656 yd).
P.m.K. - Phosphor mit Kern ("phosphorus with steel core")
machine gun ammunition loaded with the 10.15 grams (156.6 gr) P.m.K. bullets that had a muzzle velocity of 830 m/s (2,723 ft/s) and an operating pressure of 280 MPa (40,611 psi). This cartridge can be recognised by the black primer sealant and yellow tipped bullet. The projectile contained a hardened steel core embedded in lead at top and bottom and 0.5 g phosphor. The projectile has a small opening, sealed with solder that melts during firing allowing the phosphor to ignite and release a white smoke trail for 500 to 700 m (547 to 766 yd) during flight. The projectiles were intended to ignite flammable substances like fuels to set vehicles and aircraft on fire. This ammunition was also produced in a P.m.K.-v high-velocity or "v" ammunition variant that added 115 m/s (377 ft/s) muzzle velocity to the normal P.m.K. variant.
B - Beobachtung ("observation")
The German Luftwaffe 10.85 grams (167.4 gr) B (Beobachtung—"observation") incendiary ball bullets contained phosphorus and "had a pellet in it which exploded on contact with any target, however frail". The projectile featured an internal floating firing pin mechanism detonates a small capsule of tetryl which in turn ignites the white phosphorus in the nose of the projectile during sudden deceleration producing a clearly observable amount of flash and smoke. The detonation on contact could cause fire. It had a muzzle velocity of 800 m/s (2,625 ft/s) and an operating pressure of 300 MPa (43,511 psi). The B bullet was like any other high-explosive or incendiary bullet, illegal for anti-personnel use according to the Saint Petersburg Declaration and Hague Conventions. "The Germans maintained that it was used mainly for observation and range-finding, but observers report having seen them in rifle clips and machine gun belts". Often this round was used to set vehicles and aircraft on fire. The regular German infantry units were not allowed to use this round; however German snipers on the Eastern Front were permitted by Adolf Hitler in February 1945 to use these rounds that caused horrendous wounds as the projectiles tended to detonate after 100 to 130 millimetres (3.9 to 5.1 in) penetration in human tissue. Karabiner 98k service rifles handled these cartridges without issues. This cartridge can be recognised by the black primer sealant, and a blackened bullet leaving the tip without colour. This ammunition was also produced in a B-v high-velocity or "v" ammunition variant that added 110 m/s (361 ft/s) muzzle velocity to the normal B variant.
All verbesserte (v) ("improved") high-velocity ammunition variants were loaded to a 50 MPa (7,252 psi) higher operating pressure than the corresponding normal ammunition variants. This increase in operating pressure resulted in a noticeable increase in muzzle velocity and barrel wear. The verbesserte (v) high-velocity ammunition variants operating pressures remained below the civilian (P_{max}) 390 MPa (56,565 psi) C.I.P. ruling.
Patrone L.S. - Leichtes Spitzgeschoß ("light spitzer bullet")
machine gun anti aircraft training ammunition loaded with 5.5 grams (85 gr) bullets with aluminium cores that had a muzzle velocity of 925 m/s (3,035 ft/s). Due to the lightweight bullet the maximum range was limited to approximately 2,000 m (2,187 yd). This cartridge can be recognized by the green stripe painted over the case head.
Patrone L.S. L'spur - Leichtes Spitzgeschoß Leuchtspur ("light spitzer bullet with tracer")
machine gun anti aircraft training ammunition. The L.S. L'spur bullet weighed 6 grams (93 gr) and was basically the same as used in the L.S. ammunition but combined with a tracer that added 0.5 grams (7.7 gr) extra weight. This cartridge can be recognized by the green stripe over the case head and a black bullet tip.
Platzpatrone 33 ("blank cartridge")
two cannelures in the brass, red wood- or cardboard-bullet, cardboard plug (Fließpappe-Pfropfen) between bullet and propellant powder. Safe distance given at 25 m (27 yd).
Exerzierpatrone ("drill cartridge" )

Exerzierpatrone S.K. ("drill cartridge S.K.") with vertical grooves in the brass for aiming exercises.
Werkzeugpatrone s.S. ("toolcartridge s.S.") with the same weight as a s.S. ball cartridge for examining the functioning of a firearms action. A horizontal ring of small holes above the extractor grooves differentiated the Werkzeug round from the s.S. ball cartridge.

Beschußpatrone s.S. ("proof cartridge s.S.")
proof test cartridge that produced 450 MPa (65,267 psi) proof pressure. This is lower than the civilian C.I.P. 487.50 MPa (70,706 psi) PE piezo pressure proof test required for new or old refurbished 7.92×57mm Mauser chambered arms.
Anschußpatrone s.S. ("sighting-in cartridge s.S.")
s.S. cartridge purpose-manufactured with particularly low production tolerances. These were used for zeroing in new arms as part of the acceptance process before issue. Due to their precision they were also popular with snipers. There were no markings on the cartridge itself present to distinguish it from a normal s.S. cartridge. For recognition the cartridge boxes had a label with the word Anschuß on the outside.

== British military ammunition ==
British cartridges included "ball", "armour-piercing", "tracer", and "incendiary". Blanks and a drill round were also available for instruction purposes. The drill round was an aluminium bullet fixed in a chromium-plated case which had three deep lengthwise recesses painted red to identify it. Ammunition was supplied in belted form with 225 rounds per belt.

Designation	Marks	Annulus colour	Notes
Cartridge, SA, Ball, 7.92mm	Mark I.Z, Mark II.Z	Dark purple if present	Mark II.Z bullet has "flatter" nose and longer parallel portion to engage with rifling
Cartridge, SA, Armour-piercing, 7.92mm	Mark I.Z, Mark II.Z	Green	Hard steel core, lead-antimony sleeve, steel envelope
Cartridge, SA, Tracer, 7.92mm	Mark I.Z, Mark II.Z	Red	Red tracer composition in non-streamlined bullet. Effective for 900 yards.
Cartridge, SA, Incendiary, 7.92mm	Mark I	Blue	

The ball case was filled with a charge of around 45 grains (3 g) of nitro-cellulose.

The British cartridge was used in the Besa machine gun. This was a Czechoslovak ZB-53 design adopted shortly before the war as a move towards rimless ammunition across the armed service. However the move was disrupted by the lead up to war. The BESA was installed in most tanks and armoured cars of British design of that period. The original Czech design was also produced for German use following the occupation of Czechoslovakia and captured German ammunition could be used and vice versa.

== Polish military ammunition ==
The cartridges manufactured in Poland during the interwar period were mainly copies or modifications of the corresponding original German cartridge designs. The standard rifle cartridge was loaded with the 9.9 g (152.8 gr) S bullet (Spiczasty, "Pointed [Ball]"), a copy of the 1905 pattern German S Patrone. For machine guns a cartridge variant loaded with the heavier 12.8 g (197.5 gr) SC bullet (Spiczasty Ciężki, "Pointed, Heavy [Ball]") — a copy of the German 1934 pattern s.S. cartridge — was used. The variant loaded with the armor-piercing P bullet (przeciwpancerny) was a copy of the German SmK cartridge. The armor-piercing-with-tracer PS (przeciwpancerny smugowy) and incendiary Z (zapalający) cartridges were Polish modifications of the original German counterpart designs. The Polish designed a machine gun cartridge loaded with the long-range D bullet (dalekosiężny), which offered a maximum plunging fire range of 5,200 m (5,687 yd) to 5,500 m (6,015 yd).

== Romanian military ammunition ==
The Romanian military used the 7.92×57mm Mauser cartridge as standard issue from its independence. It gradually converted over in the 1950s and 1960s to using Warsaw Pact standard calibers.

The 7.92 LPS gs MD71 (7.92×56mm) cartridge was manufactured in Romania by their Factory 22 (UM Sadu) from 1972 to 1978. It had a 10 g (154.3 gr) Semi-Armor-Piercing bullet with a copper jacket and mild steel core, corrosive VT stick propellant, and a Berdan-primed steel case with a green lacquer coating. The case mouth and primer pocket were sealed with a red sealant. It is unusual in that it has a uniform 56mm-long case, perhaps for cleaner extraction when used in belt-fed 8mm machine guns. Since it is from the portion after the neck, it chambers and feeds safely and extracts positively. It has sometimes been confused with the rather different Hungarian 8×56mmR Mannlicher cartridge. Some experts mistakenly believed it to be an experimental rimless pointed-bullet Hungarian "sniper rifle cartridge" developed by Hungary's Factory 22 (Andezit Muvek) until it became available as surplus.

It is not clear why the cartridge was manufactured, as the Romanian military used the standard Communist-Bloc 7.62mm M91 Mosin-Nagant rifle round. Some believe it may have been for an experimental self-loading rifle or for a Communist Bloc client. It was most likely for use in the obsolete 8mm vz 24 rifles and MG 42 machine guns used by the Romanian Garzile Patriotice ("Patriotic Guards") from 1968 to the early 1980s.

== Yugoslav military ammunition ==
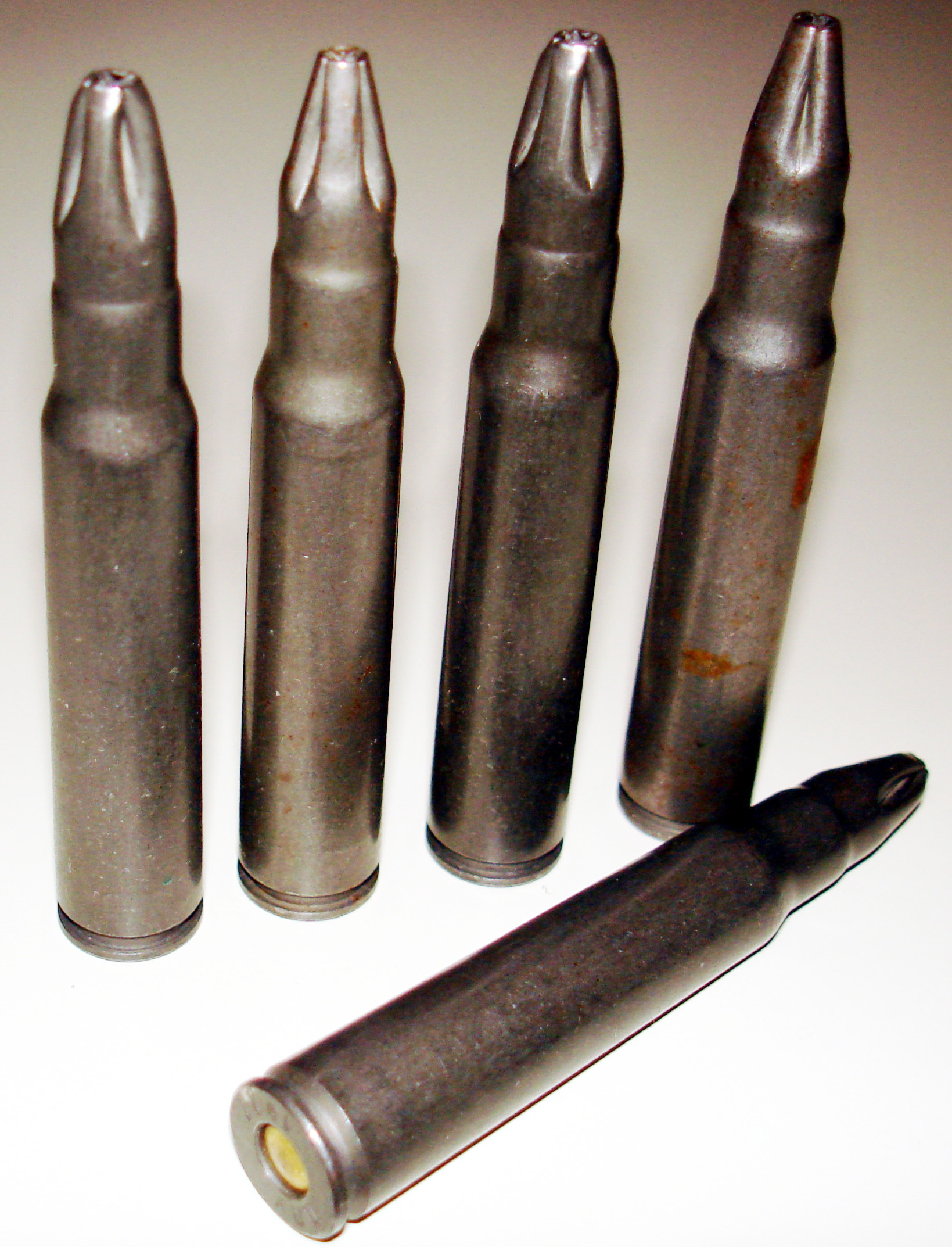
Yugoslav People's Army 7.9 mm blank cartridges

After World War II the Socialist Federal Republic of Yugoslavia used the 7.92×57mm Mauser as a military service round. The Yugoslav People's Army (JNA) designated their 7.92×57mm Mauser ammunition as 7.9 mm. At the end of the 1940s the Yugoslav People's Army adopted a 7.9 mm cartridge, ball M49 variant, designated M49, as infantry ammunition for use in Mauser-type bolt-action rifles and MG 42 general-purpose machinegun clones like the M53. Yugoslavian state arms manufacturers like Prvi Partizan started making 7.92×57mm Mauser ammunition for export to the Middle East in the 1950s and 1960s. In the 1970s the JNA started to develop a new more accurate 7.9 mm ammunition, sniper universal ball M75, variant, designated M75. This was done to support the new Zastava M76 sniper/designated marksman rifle for the JNA. Other adoption of the ammunition where tracer round 7.9 mm cartridge, ball with tracer, designated M70. The M70 tracer round burns out to 900 m (984 yd). For training and ceremonial use a 7.9 mm cartridge, blank was adopted. By the mid-1980s the JNA started to push toward adopting Soviet / Warsaw Pact 7.62×54mm R ammunition. This process was interrupted by the fall of Yugoslavia and brought the 7.9 mm back into military service with the onset of the Yugoslav wars.

== The 7.92×57mm Mauser as parent case ==
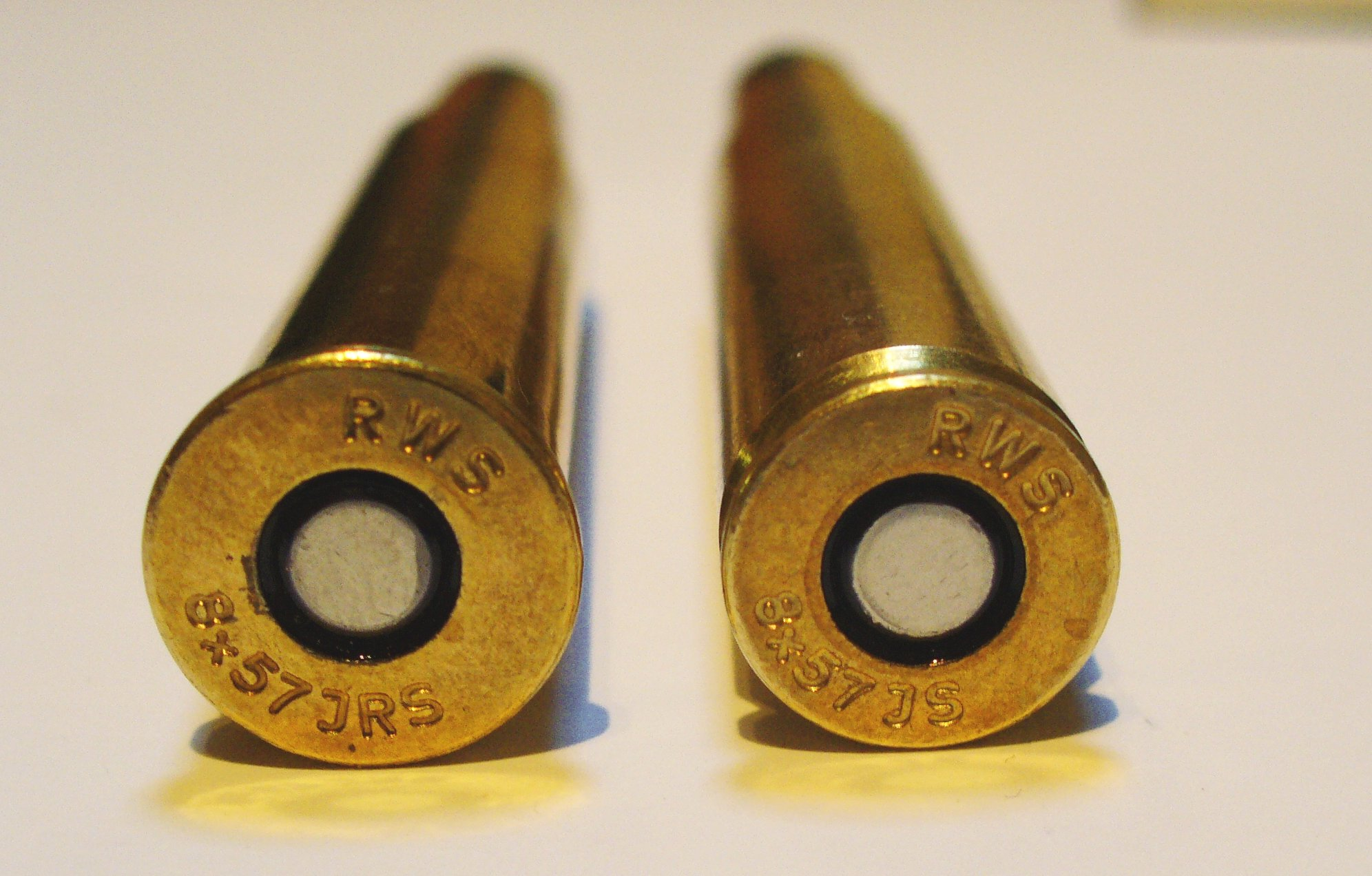
8×57 IRS and 8×57 IS (a.k.a. 7.92×57mm Mauser) sporting rounds. The rimless (IS) cartridge on the right is used in repeating and self-loading rifles, while the rimmed cartridge on the left is for breech-loading actions only (and is marked IRS).

This was the parent case for many other later cartridges, such as:

- 5.6×57mm
- 6×57mm Triebel (wildcat)
- 7.92×33mm Kurz
- 7.92×107mm DS
- 8×60mm S
- 9×57mm Mauser
- 9.3×57mm

== See also ==
- List of rifle cartridges
- Table of handgun and rifle cartridges
- 8mm caliber
- 7.92×33mm Kurz

Contemporary military rifle cartridges

- 7.5×55mm Swiss
- 7.62×54mmR
- 8mm Lebel
- .303 British
- .30-06 Springfield
- 7.5×54mm MAS
