= 9.3×57mm Mauser =

Rifle cartridge

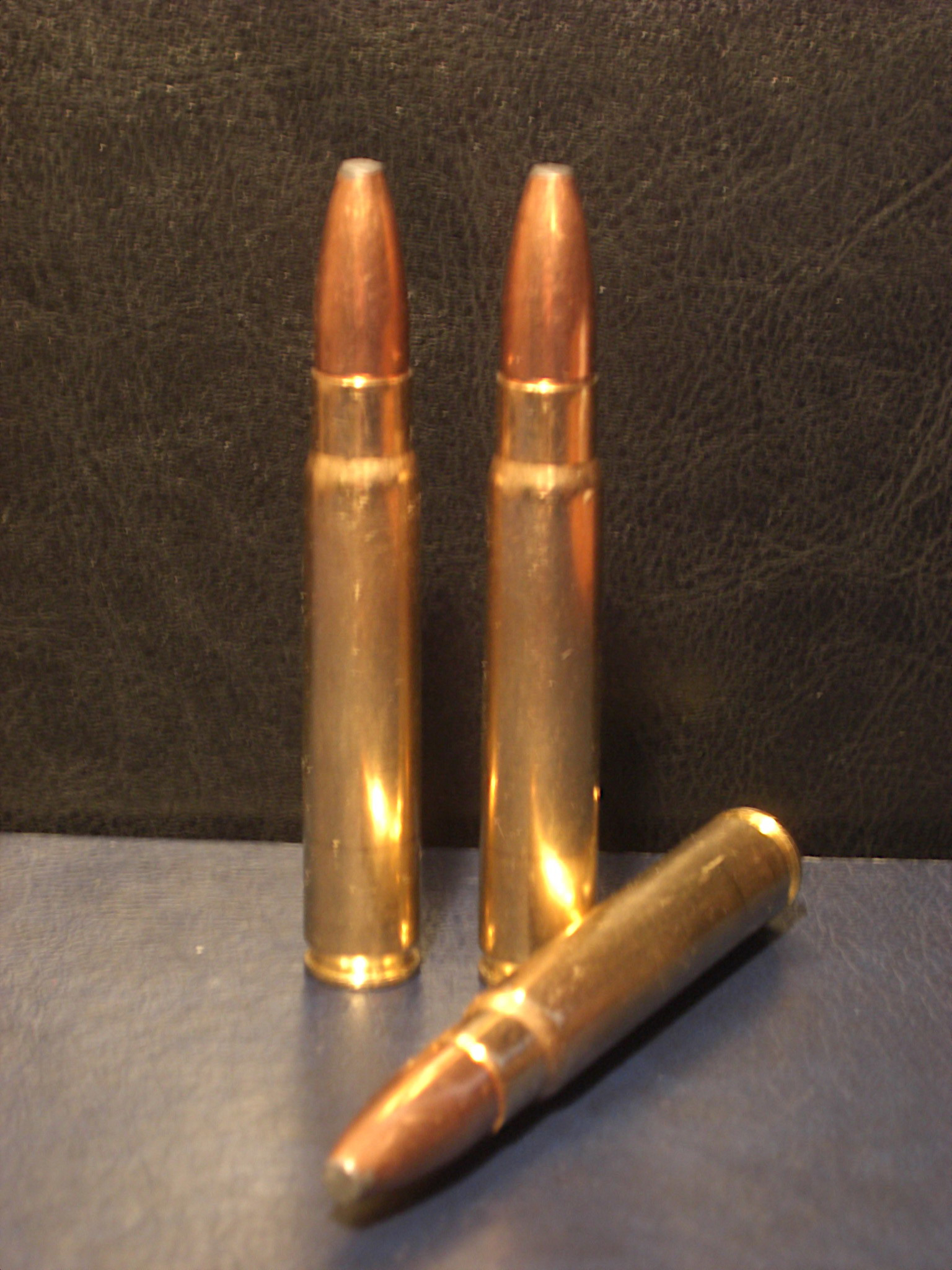
- Type: rifle

Production history
- Designer: Mauser based on 7.92×57mm Mauser
- Manufacturer: Norma

Specifications
- Parent case: 9×57mm Mauser
- Case type: Rimless, bottleneck
- Bullet diameter: 9.30 mm (0.366 in)
- Neck diameter: 10 mm (0.39 in)
- Shoulder diameter: 10.95 mm (0.431 in)
- Base diameter: 11.95 mm (0.470 in)
- Rim diameter: 11.95 mm (0.470 in)
- Case length: 56.5 mm (2.22 in)
- Overall length: 81 mm (3.2 in)
- Primer type: Large rifle
- Filling: 2065

Ballistic performance
Bullet mass/type	Velocity	Energy
232 gr (15 g)	2,362 ft/s (720 m/s)	2,875 ft⋅lbf (3,898 J)
285 gr (18 g)	2,070 ft/s (630 m/s)	2,860 ft⋅lbf (3,880 J)

The 9.3×57mm was created by necking up the 7.92×57mm Mauser cartridge. The 9.3×57mm (bullet diameter .365 in.), introduced in 1900, is closely related to the 7.92×57mm Mauser and its derivative 9x57mm Mauser cartridges, even though some dimensions of the cartridge case are slightly different. It was designed as one of the early "Big Game" cartridges with an overall length limited to fit within the overall magazine dimensions of the standard Mauser Model 1898 pattern rifles, and became popular in Africa for those with limited resources and access to surplus Mausers. The 9.3×57mm is still fairly popular among moose hunters in Scandinavia (among hunters in Sweden it is affectionately known as "potatiskastaren", the spud gun, because of the slow and heavy bullet). Factory loaded ammunition with 232 grains (15.0 g) and 285 grains (18.5 g) bullets is available from Norma of Sweden. The 9.3×57mm Norma factory load with a 232 grains (15.0 g) bullet has a muzzle velocity of 2,362 feet per second (720 m/s) for 2,875 foot-pounds force (3,898 J) of energy, which makes it 10-20% more powerful than the 9×57mm.

== Usage ==
This cartridge often is used for hunting wild boar and elk in Scandinavia, as is the 9.3x53R Finnish. In the northern latitudes of North America, it is a reasonable solution for large heavy bodied game that may require heavy bullets and speeds providing the deep penetration to be capable of humanely stopping this kind of animal. In Alaska, apparently Moose can be a contributing factor in more human deaths than do Bears of all varieties. The 9.3 mm bullets (.366" diameter) loaded in this cartridge come in 232 and 286 grain weights.

== Reloading ==
Cartridges of the World lists reloading information for both the 232 and 286gr bullets using IMR3031 powder as well as showing a Norma factory load.

The loads listed in Cartridges of the World are valid, but dated. The loading information has not been updated to reflect newer powders than IMR 3031.

C.I.P. https://bobp.cip-bobp.org/uploads/tdcc/tab-i/9-3-x-57-en.pdf
