= Mauser Model 1902 =

- Type: Bolt-action rifle
- Place of origin: German Empire

Service history
- Used by: Mexico; Spain
- Wars: Mexican Revolution; Yaqui Revolt of 1926-1928; Spanish Civil War

Production history
- Manufacturer: Loewe Berlin; DWM; Steyr; Fabrica Nacional de Cartuchos; Fábrica Nacional de Armas
- Produced: 1902-1934
- Variants: Model 1910

Specifications
- Mass: 3.96 kg (8.7 lb)
- Length: 123.2 cm (48.50 in)
- Barrel length: 73.7 cm (29.0 in)
- Cartridge: 7×57mm Mauser
- Action: Bolt-action
- Effective firing range: 2,000 m (2,190 yd) with iron sights
- Feed system: 5-round stripper clip, internal magazine
- Sights: Iron sights.

The Mauser Model 1902 was a Mauser bolt-action rifle, designed for Mexico. It was similar to the Mauser Model 1895 but used the Gewehr 98 action.

== Design ==
The Model 1902 was an upgraded Model 1895, the standard rifle of the Mexican Army at the beginning of the 20th century. The improvements were derived from the German Gewehr 98, such as the use of three locking lugs and a gas protection on the bolt. It fired the 7×57mm Mauser and accepted the Model 1895 bayonet. Two contracts were signed in 1902 and 1906 by the Mexican general Bernardo Reyes. They were produced by Loewe Berlin, Steyr and DWM. 38,000 DWM-made rifles were delivered, and 40,000 more made by Steyr.

== Mexican Mauser Model 1910 ==
The Mexican Mauser Model 1910 or Mauser Mexicano Modelo 1910 was a locally made Model 1902. To reduce the country dependency on foreign suppliers, the Fabrica Nacional de Cartuchos and the Fabrica Nacional de Armas were created with the help of foreign technicians. A Model 1910 carbine, similar to the Model 1895 carbine, was also produced. 8,000 bayonets originally produced for the Mondragón rifle were adapted for the Mauser 1910. The Model 1902 and 1910 saw combat use during the Mexican Revolution. Production of the Model 1910 was slowed down because of the fall of the Díaz government in 1911 and it was supplemented by the Steyr Model 1912 Mauser. Nevertheless, 40,000 were produced until 1934. The Model 1910 also saw service in the Spanish Civil War where 20,000 were sent to aid the Spanish Republicans.

== See also ==
- Mexican Mauser Model 1936
- Mexican Mauser Model 1954
