= Vz. 98/22 =

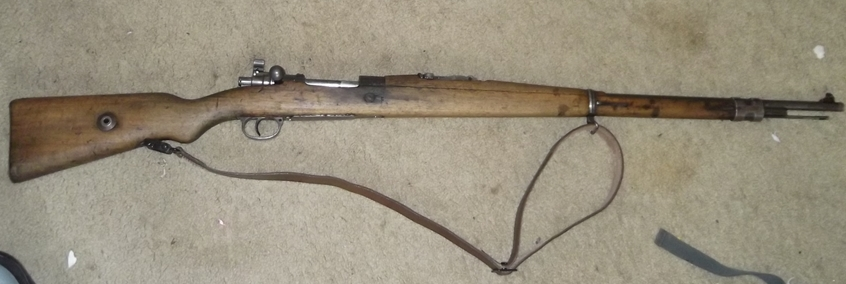
- Type: Bolt-action rifle
- Place of origin: Czechoslovakia

Service history
- In service: 1922–1924 (Czechoslovakia)
- Used by: See Users
- Wars: Warlord Era; Chinese Civil War

Production history
- Designed: 1922
- Manufacturer: Zbrojovka Brno
- Produced: 1924-1930

Specifications
- Mass: 4.3 kg (9.5 lb) loaded
- Length: 124.4 cm (49.0 in)
- Cartridge: 7.92×57mm Mauser; 7×57mm Mauser; 7.65×53mm Mauser
- Caliber: 8 mm (0.31 in)
- Action: Bolt-action
- Rate of fire: 10–15 rpm
- Muzzle velocity: 878 m/s (2,880 ft/s)
- Feed system: 5-round stripper clip fed internal box magazine, quickly detachable floorplate
- Sights: V notch Iron sights

The Vz. 98/22 is a Czechoslovak-designed, full-sized, bolt-action rifle, designed and produced in Czechoslovakia. It replaced the Gewehr 98 rifles purchased from Germany after the Treaty of Versailles. The rifles were quickly replaced by the shorter Vz. 24, and were sold to various other nations, most notably Iran and Turkey, where they remained in service to World War II era and beyond.

== Inception ==
When Czechoslovakia was founded in 1918, they immediately began planning to establish and arm their own military. In 1922, it was chosen to build a derivative of the Mexican Mauser 1912. It was known as the Vz. 98/22.

The Czechoslovak military was particularly picky about the quality of their new service rifles, and only adopted a small number of them into their own military service. Such Czech service rifles were stamped with a E-22, or E-23 stamp. (The - being a stand in for the Czechoslovak lion typical of Czech military proof markings) The rifles that were not adopted were sold in commission to either Iran, Turkey, or on the public market.

== Decommission ==
The Vz. 98/22 was quickly replaced by the lighter, and easier to handle Vz. 24, and the remaining vz. 98/22 rifles were either sold to Iran, Turkey, or on the public market. Most of the public sales were still to Iran or Turkey, but some were sold to the Republic of China to supplement other Mauser type rifles. In China, these rifles were used during the Warlord Era, the Chinese Civil War and the Korean War.

== World War II ==
Most of these rifles did not see official service in World War II. However, they remained in service in China into the 1950s and Kurdistan rebels still used it in the 2010s.

== Markings ==
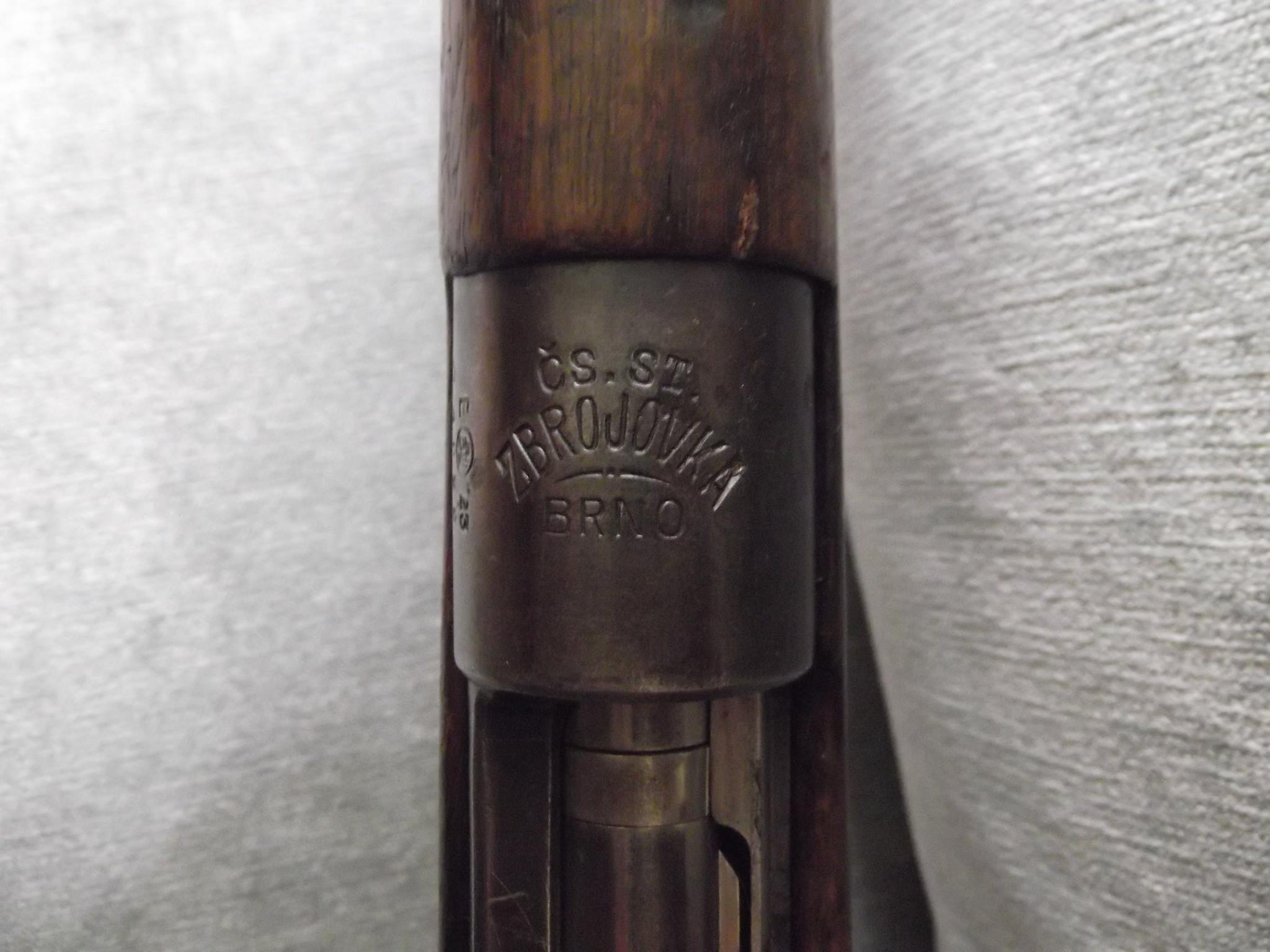
Top of the receiver, showing the curved BRNO stamp

Many 98/22 rifles displayed a slight curved stamp on the receiver, displaying the words "ČS.ST/ZBROJOVKA/BRNO", translating roughly into "Czechoslovak Armory of Brno." The later models of this rifle has the same text displayed without the curve to the text. If the rifle was adopted into Czechoslovak service, it will have a E-22 or E-23 mark, usually on the side of the receiver, just above the serial number.

These rifles, as with any Czechoslovak rifle, will have a (Z) stamp on most metal pieces of the rifle.

Some Turkish models have Turkish markings in addition to Czech markings but other only have Czech markings. Turkish models will also often have sights in Ottoman Turkish numerals or Arabic numerals. Chinese models often have ideograms on the stock.

Iranian models will always retain the Persian numerals on the sights.

== Users ==
- Republic of China (1912–49)
- China
- Czechoslovakia
- Persia
- Turkey
- Kurdistan

== See also ==
- vz. 33
- M24 series
- vz. 24
