= Mauser Model 1954 =

Mauser Model 1954 may refer to:

- The Mexican Mauser Model 1954
- The Brazilian Mauser Model 1954 or Mosquetão Itajubá M954, a Mauser Model 1908 variant
