= Mauser Model 1936 =

Mauser Model 1936 may refer to:

- Belgian Mauser Model 1889/36, a Mauser Model 1889 variant
- The Mexican Mauser Model 1936
