= Karabin wz. 98a =

karabin wz. 98a
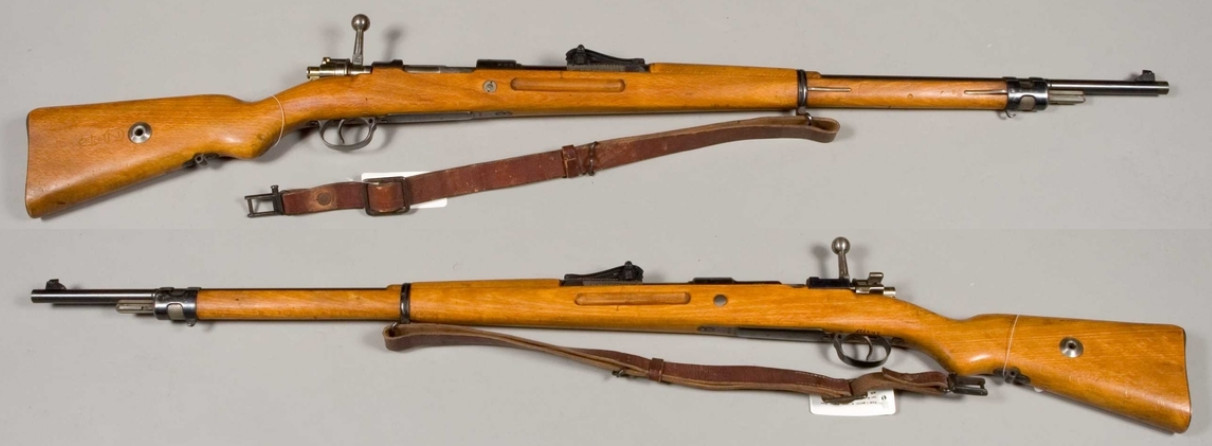
- Type: Service rifle
- Place of origin: Poland

Service history
- In service: 1936–1940
- Used by: Poland; Germany as Gewehr 299(p)
- Wars: World War II

Production history
- Designed: 1934
- Produced: 1936 to 1939
- No. built: 44,500

Specifications
- Mass: 4.36 kg (9.6 lb)
- Length: 1,250 mm (49 in)
- Barrel length: 740 mm (29 in)
- Cartridge: 7.92×57mm Mauser
- Caliber: 7.92 mm
- Action: Bolt-action
- Rate of fire: approx 15 round/min
- Muzzle velocity: 880 m/s (2,900 ft/s)
- Feed system: 5 rounds internal box

The karabin wzór 98a (rifle pattern 98a) abbreviated to kb wz. 98a was a Polish rifle of the late 1930s; a development of the earlier kb wz. 98 rifle, itself a derivative of German Gewehr 98 bolt-action Mauser rifle.

== Design history ==
After gaining independence, the Polish Army was armed mainly with a mixture of Russian, Austrian and German rifles. French rifles also were brought to Poland by returning Blue Army soldiers. As a result, at the end of the Polish-Soviet War in 1921, the Polish army was armed with approximately 24 types of guns and 22 types of rifles, all firing different ammunition. Since such a combination of designs adversely affected training and logistics, work on one standard rifle was carried out starting in 1919. Initially, it was assumed that the Lebel would be adopted, but it was quickly rejected as an obsolete design. Later on, proposals for adoption as a standard rifle included the Mannlicher M1895 or Steyr M1912 Mauser.

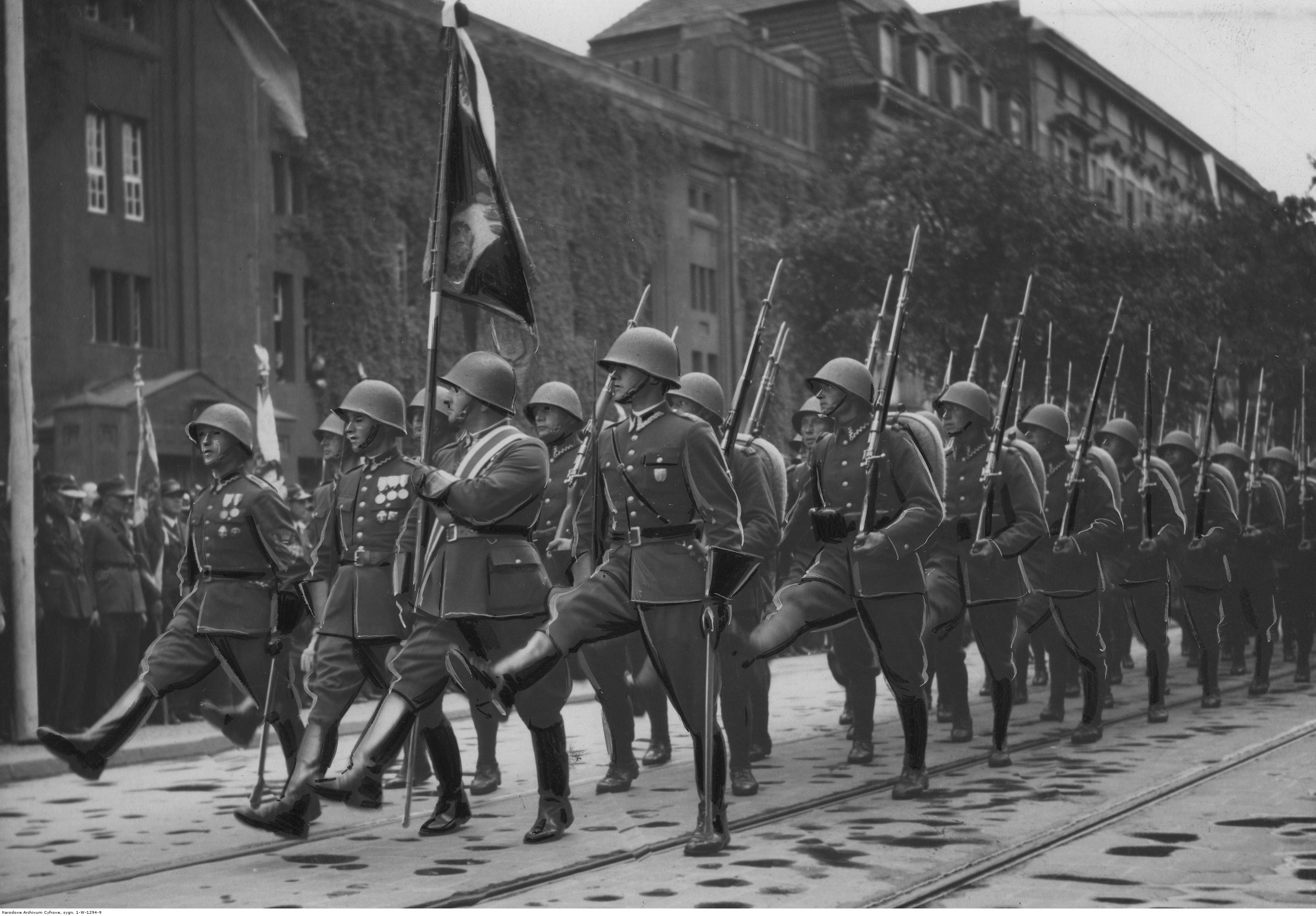
73rd Infantry Regiment parading in Katowice, July 1938

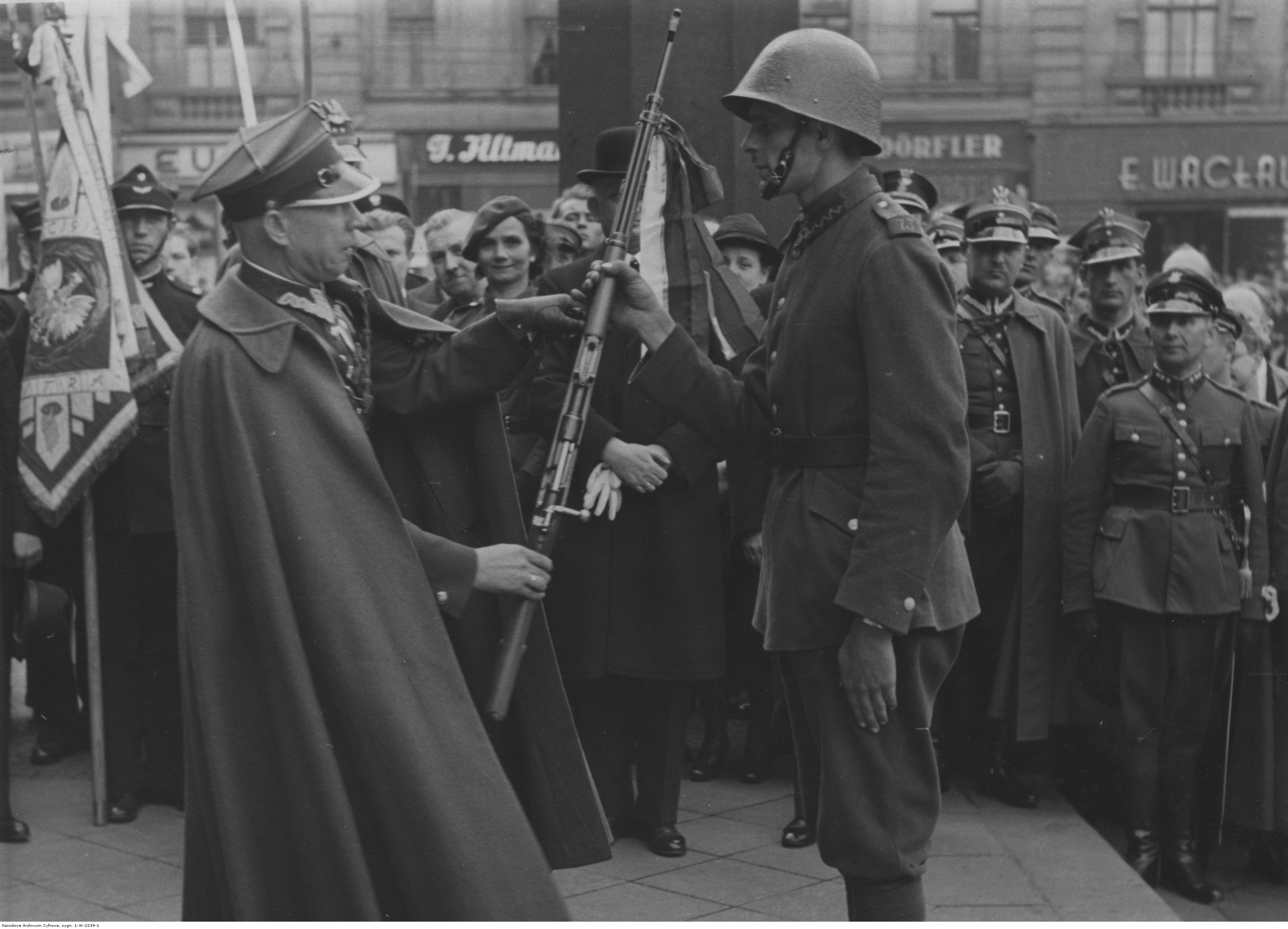
A soldier of the 73rd Infantry Regiment presented with a kb wz. 98a rifle

The situation changed when the Council of Ambassadors resolution of 10 March 1921 ordered the transfer to Poland of machinery, equipment, documentation, and large stocks of raw materials from the former Prussian Royal Arsenal in Danzig. During World War I, this factory produced the Gewehr 98, facilitating the choice of the Mauser 98 action as the basis for any new Polish military rifle. With the transfer of the machinery and equipment from Danzig, production of the Kb wz. 98, the Polish copy of the standard Gewehr 98 started in Radom and Warsaw in 1922. In 1924, after approximately 22,000 rifles were manufactured, wz. 98 production ended. The kbk wz. 29 carbine eventually started to replace the wz. 98 rifles in 1930.

As a result of changes in Polish military doctrine in the early thirties, the kbk wz. 29 carbines did not meet the new requirements. As a result, in 1934 Poland decided to start production of an improved version of the wz. 98 rifle, the wz. 98a. The new rifle differed from its predecessor in that it had a new notch sight and possessed the improved bayonet attachment of the wz. 29. Production started at the National Arms Factory in Radom in 1936; the two years' delay between adoption and the start of production was due to the need for finding an acceptable source of wood for the rifle stocks.

Before the outbreak of war in 1939, they had managed to produce 44,500 wz. 98a rifles. They were one of the basic armaments of the Polish army. Captured wz. 98 rifles were also taken into service by the Wehrmacht as the Gewehr 299(p).

== Technical overview ==
The wz. 98a rifle was mechanically identical to the German Gewehr 98 rifle. It was a bolt-action repeating rifle, using a rotating bolt turned 90 degrees to lock or unlock. Locking was by means of two locking lugs at the front of the bolt, with a safety lug at the rear. Ammunition was fed from a fixed double stack box magazine holding five rounds. The safety was mounted on the rear of the bolt assembly. The rifle was fitted with iron sights, a tapered front sight blade and a tangent-type rear sight with a V-shaped notch, graduated from 100 to 2000 meters in 100 meters increments. The rifle used the bayonets wz. 22, wz. 24, wz. 25, wz. 27, wz. 28 or wz. 29.

== Bibliography ==
- Zbigniew Nail, Piotr Zarzycki, the Polish construction arms, SIGMA NOT 1993. ISBN 83-85001-69-7
- Roman Matuszewski, Ireneusz J. Wojciechowski, TBiU no. 91 Mauser rifle wz. 1898, WMON 1983. ISBN 83-11-06993-X
- Instruction on infantry weapons, repeating rifle Mauser wz syst. 1898, Publisher Bookshop Military Min Spr. Prov 1928
