= Argentine Mauser Model 1909 =

Mauser Modelo Argentino 1909
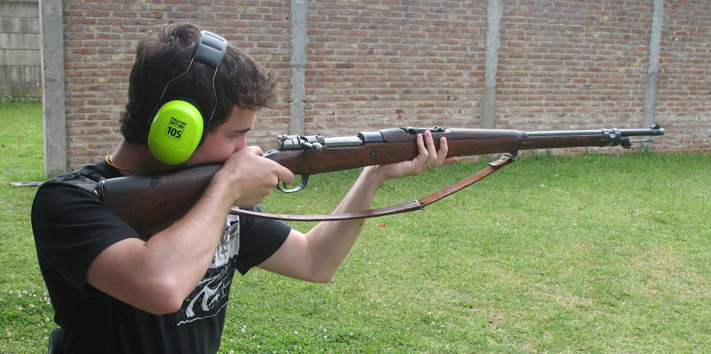
- Modern shooting with a Mauser 1909
- Type: Bolt-action rifle
- Place of origin: Germany/Argentina

Service history
- In service: 1905–1960s
- Used by: Argentina; Paraguay; Dominican Republic
- Wars: United States occupation of the Dominican Republic (1916–1924); Chaco War

Production history
- Designed: 1909
- Manufacturer: DWM; Fabrica Militar de Armas Portatiles
- Produced: 1909–1959
- No. built: ~285,000

Specifications
- Mass: 4.17 kg (9.2 lb); 3.6 kg (7.9 lb)
- Length: 1,240 mm (49 in); 1,056 mm (41.6 in)
- Barrel length: 740 mm (29 in); 556 mm (21.9 in)
- Cartridge: 7.65×53mm Mauser
- Action: Bolt-action
- Muzzle velocity: 839.6 metres per second (2,755 ft/s)
- Feed system: 5-round stripper clip, internal magazine
- Sights: Iron sights adjustable to 2,000 metres (2,200 yd)

The Argentine Mauser Model 1909 were Gewehr 98 pattern bolt-action battle rifles designed for the Argentine Army. They were produced both in Germany and in Argentina.

== Design ==
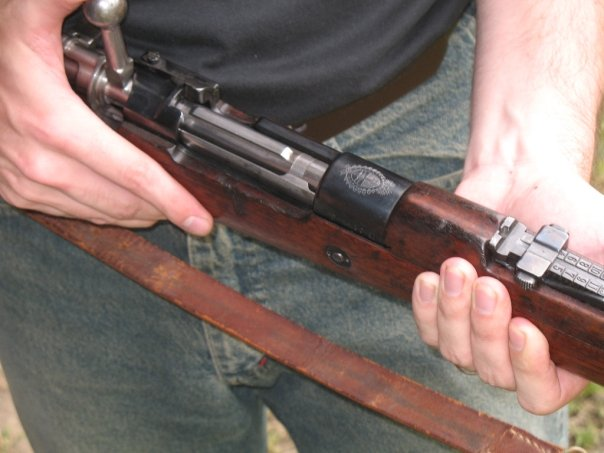
The action of the Argentine Mauser 1909

The Mauser 1909 was a slightly modified copy of the Gewehr 98. Among other modifications, the Lange Visier sight was replaced by a tangent leaf sight. The M1909 was also able to use the bayonet of the Mauser 1891 it replaced. The main producer in Germany was Deutsche Waffen und Munitionsfabriken that delivered 200,000 rifles while around 85,000 rifles were manufactured by the Fabrica Militar de Armas Portatiles, governmental plants in Rosario and Santa Fe. The Model 1909s were replaced by FN FALs without having seen combat.

Some Argentine Mauser 1909 rifles and carbines without crests were sold to Paraguay during the Chaco War.

=== Variants ===
- Mauser 1909 sniper rifle: version with a German-made scope and a bent-down bolt handle.
- Mauser 1909 cavalry carbine: shortened variant, with a straight grip stock and a forecap that covers all the barrel. The bayonet can be attached under this forecap.
- Mauser 1909 Mountain Carbine or Engineers Carbine:

== Peruvian Mauser 1909 ==
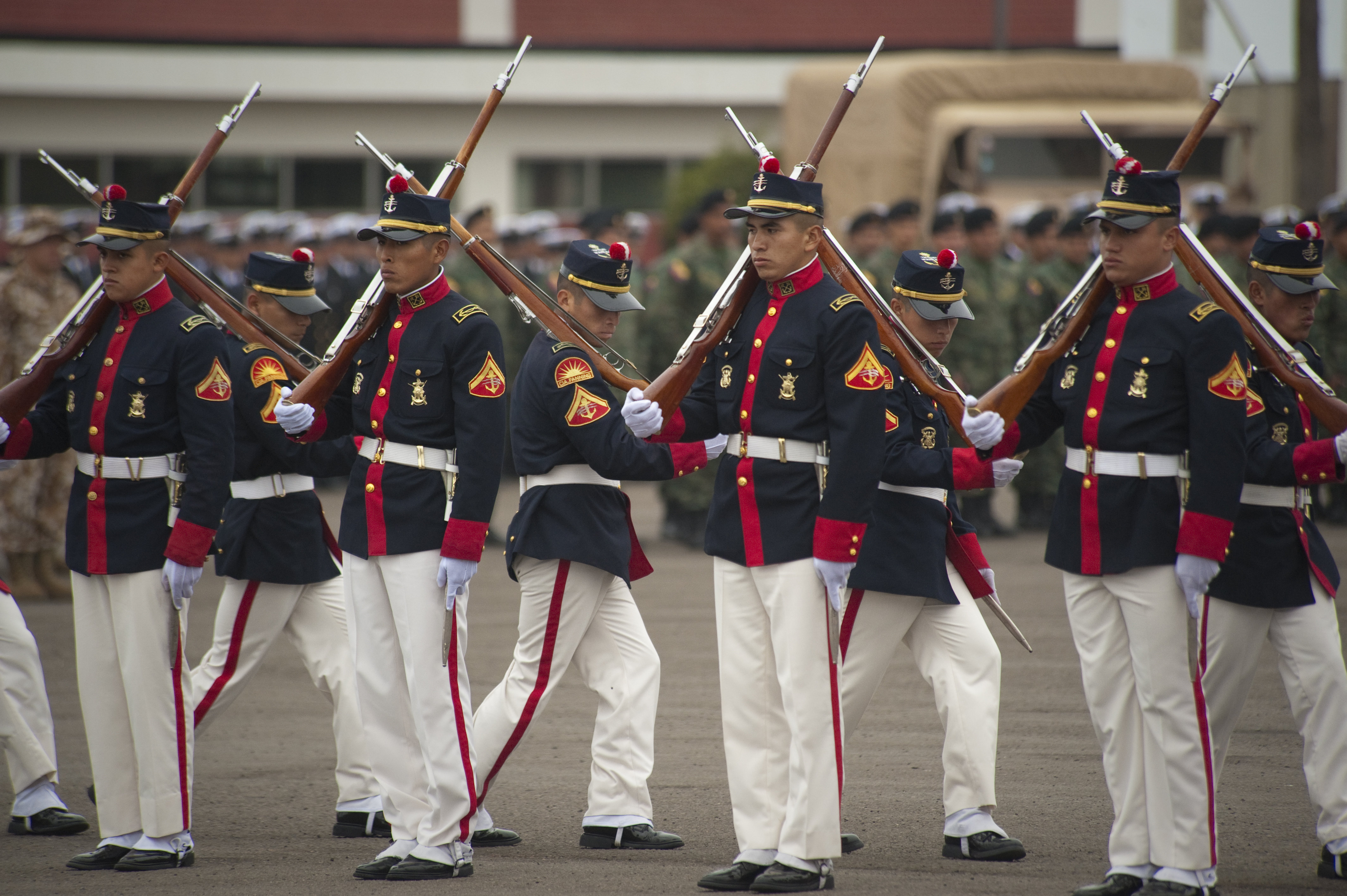
Peruvian ceremonial unit in 2010 with Mauser rifles.

Between 1910 and 1914, Peru received thousands of Mauser Model 1909 rifles, chambered in 7.65 Mauser. They were closer copies of the Gewehr 98, including the Lange Visier sight. Aside from the caliber, the only differences were the larger receiver ring, the 5 mm (0.20 in) shorter breech, the slightly modified strip guide to use older Model 1891 strips, the longer hammer, the aspheric shape of the bolt handle and the Peruvian markings. While these rifles were able to fire the old bullets with round nose, they were later adapted to spitzer bullets. These weapons were used during the Leticia Incident and the Ecuadorian–Peruvian War. After 1945, the Mauser 1909s were replaced by American weapons and were sold in the civilian market in the 1960s, a few being kept as ceremonial rifles.
