= Gewehr 98 =

German service rifle from 1898 to 1935

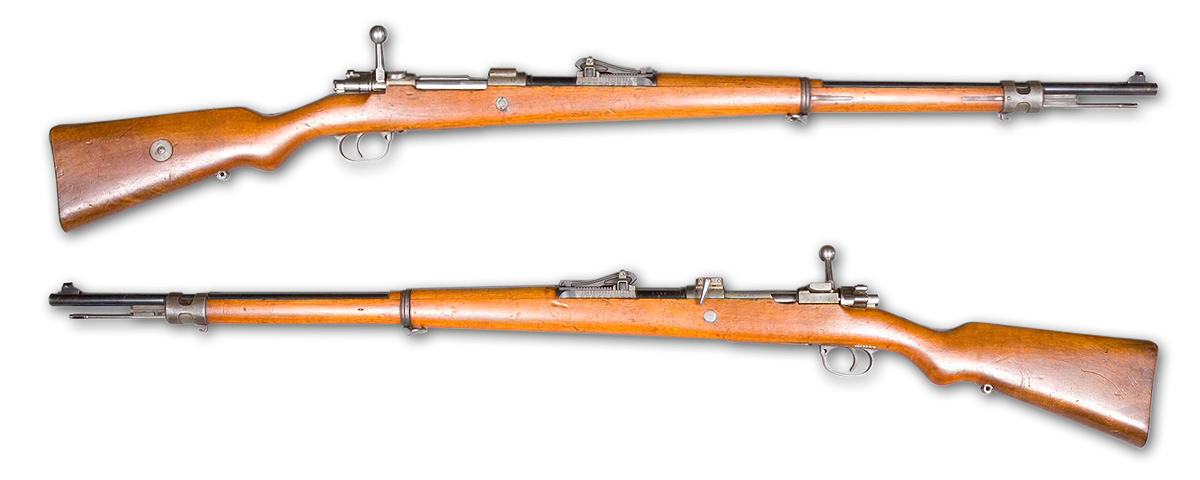
- Gewehr 98 made in 1898. From the collections of the Swedish Army Museum
- Type: Bolt-action rifle
- Place of origin: German Empire

Service history
- In service: 1898–1945
- Used by: See Users

Production history
- Designer: Paul Mauser
- Designed: 1895
- Manufacturer: Mauser; Deutsche Waffen und Munitionsfabriken; Haenel; Sauer & Sohn; Waffenwerke Oberspree; V. Chr. Schilling Co.; Steyr; Simson; Imperial Arsenals of Amberg, Danzig, Erfurt, Leipzig, and Spandau
- Produced: 1898–1918
- No. built: 9,000,000+
- Variants: K98a, K98b, Kar98az

Specifications
- Mass: 4.09 kg (9.0 lb) with empty magazine Gewehr 98; 3.50 kg (7.7 lb) Karabiner 98a
- Length: 1,250 mm (49.2 in) Gewehr 98; 1,090 mm (42.9 in) Karabiner 98a
- Barrel length: 740 mm (29.1 in) Gewehr 98; 590 mm (23.2 in) Karabiner 98a
- Cartridge: M/88 until 1903, 7.92×57mm Mauser later
- Action: Bolt action
- Rate of fire: 15 rounds/minute
- Muzzle velocity: 639 m/s (2,096 ft/s) with M/88; 878 m/s (2,881 ft/s) with 1903 pattern 9.9 g (154 gr) ball ammunition
- Effective firing range: 500 m (550 yd) (with iron sights); 1,000 m (1,100 yd) (with optics)
- Maximum firing range: 3,735 m (4,080 yd) with S Patrone
- Feed system: 5-round stripper clips in an internal box magazine
- Sights: Iron sights

The Gewehr 98 (abbreviated G98, Gew 98, or M98) is a bolt-action rifle made by Mauser for the German Empire as its service rifle from 1898 to 1935.

The Gewehr 98 action, using a 5-round stripper clip loaded with the 7.92×57mm Mauser cartridge, successfully combined and improved several bolt-action engineering concepts which were soon adopted by many other countries, including the United Kingdom, United States, and Japan. The Gewehr 98 replaced the earlier Gewehr 1888 as the main German service rifle. It first saw combat in the Chinese Boxer Rebellion and was the main German infantry service rifle of World War I. The Gewehr 98 saw further military use by the Ottoman Empire and Nationalist Spain.

It was eventually replaced by the Karabiner 98k, a carbine version using the same design, for the Wehrmacht under Nazi Germany from 1935 to 1945.

== History ==
The Gewehr 98 was introduced into German military service in 1898, replacing the Gewehr 1888. The bolt-action design was the latest refinement of the 1895 design patented by Paul Mauser on 9 September 1895. Mauser was already selling the similar Mauser Model 1895 to many other countries and had supplied less advanced Mauser rifles to the German Army from 1871 to 1888. The 1888 replacement for the Mauser was an internal design from the army but failed through an impractical design. In the interim decade, Mauser rifles became recognized as the world standard, and the German Army became outclassed by a German-made product in the hands of others.

The German Gewehr-Prüfungskommission (G.P.K.) (rifle testing commission) adopted the Gewehr 98 on 5 April 1898. The action was derived from the experimental Gewehr 96 rifle. In 1901, the first troop issues of the Gewehr 98 rifles were made to the East Asian Expeditionary Force, the Imperial German Navy, and three premier Prussian army corps. The first combat use of the Gewehr 98 was during the Boxer Rebellion (1898–1901). In 1904, contracts were placed with Waffenfabrik Mauser for 290,000 rifles and Deutsche Waffen und Munitionsfabriken (DWM) for 210,000 rifles. At the outbreak of WWI in 1914, the German Army had 2,273,080 Mauser 98-rifles of all types; an additional 7,000,000 were produced during the war.

The 8 mm M/88 cartridge which was introduced in 1888 and loaded with an 8.08 mm (.318 in) 14.6 g (226 gr) round-nose bullet was replaced on 3 April 1903, by the 7.92×57mm Mauser S Patrone (S ball cartridge) which was loaded with a new 8.20 mm (.323 in) 9.9 g (154 gr) spitzer bullet. The ammunition conversion was indicated by a small S stamped above the chamber and on the barrel at the back of the rear sight base. This was done since the 1888 pattern M/88 cartridge and 1903 S-bore pattern cartridge are two different non-interchangeable chamberings. Since the new IS bullet had a flatter trajectory the Lange Visier rear sight had to be changed with an "S"-adapted Lange Visier.

== Design details ==
The Gewehr 98 or model 98 (M98) rifle is a manually operated, magazine-fed, controlled-feed bolt-action rifle, 1,250 mm (49 in) in length and 4.09 kg (9.0 lb) in weight. It has a 740 mm (29 in) long rifled barrel and carries 5 rounds of ammunition in an internal magazine. The Gewehr 98 has two sling swivels, open front sights, and a curved tangent-type rear sight, known as the Lange Visier.

The controlled-feed bolt-action of the Gewehr 98 is a distinct feature and is regarded as one of the major bolt-action system designs.

=== M98 controlled-feed bolt-action system ===
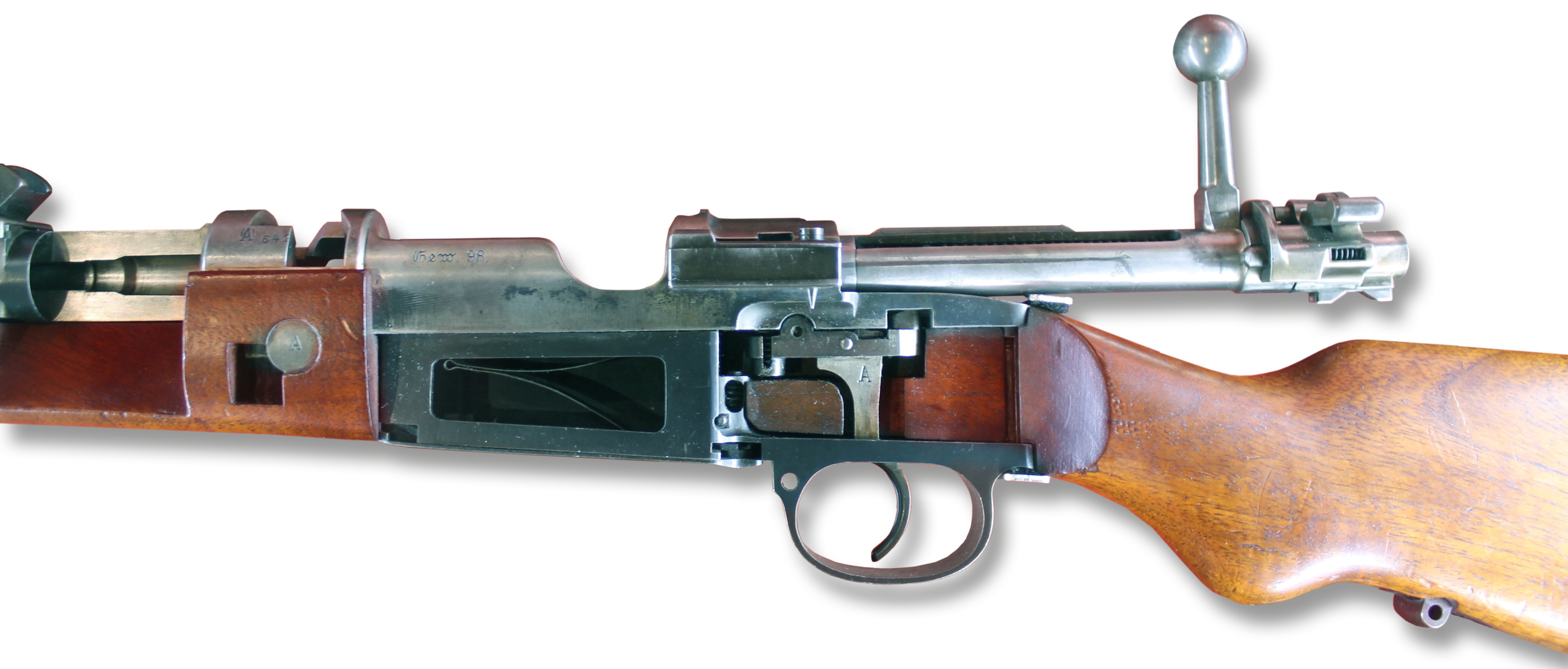
Mauser M98, cutaway model

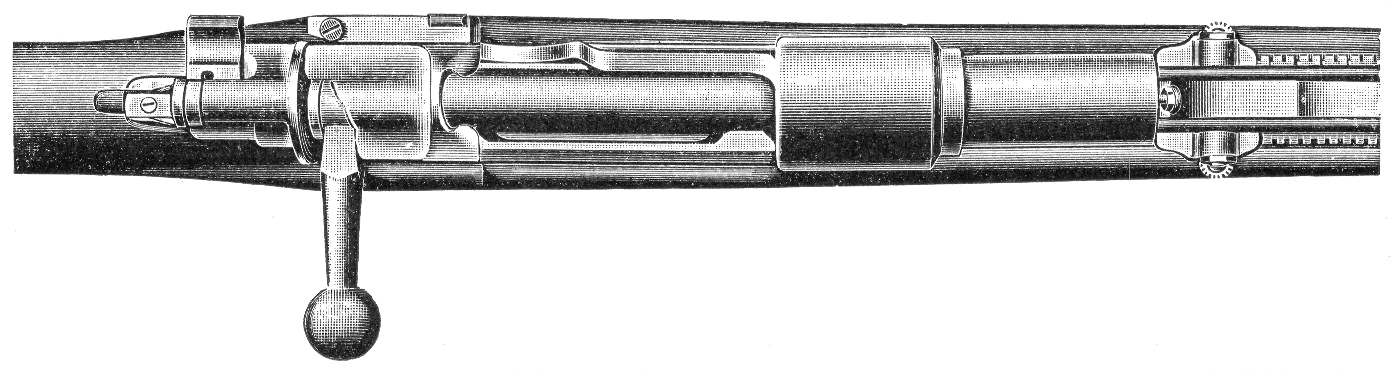
Mauser M98, action from above. The recesses for the stripper clips and thumb hole on the left can be seen.

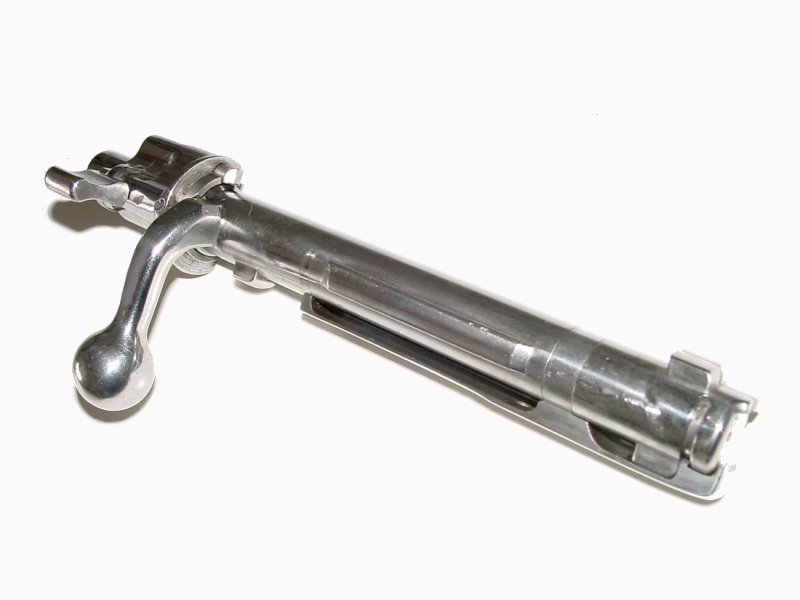
Mauser M98, marksman bolt group. Identifiable from the bent bolt handle.

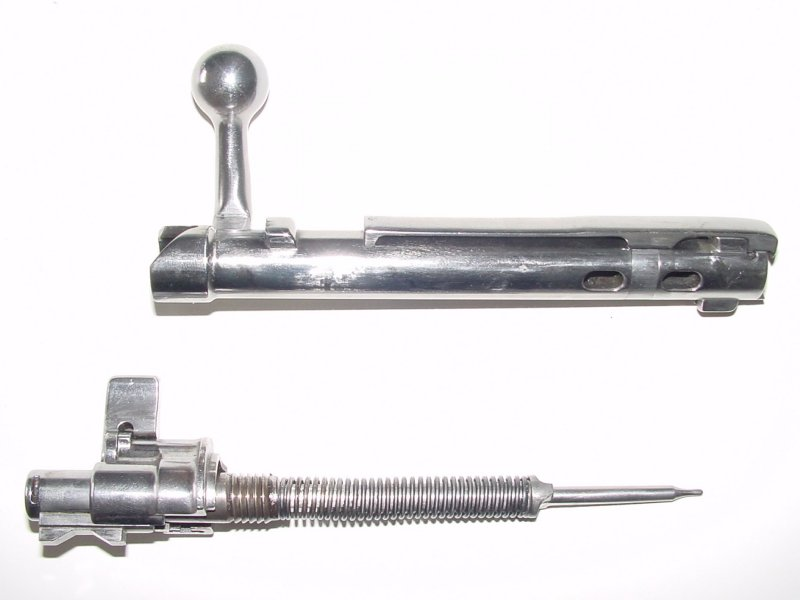
Mauser M98, bolt and firing pin and safety mechanism field stripped

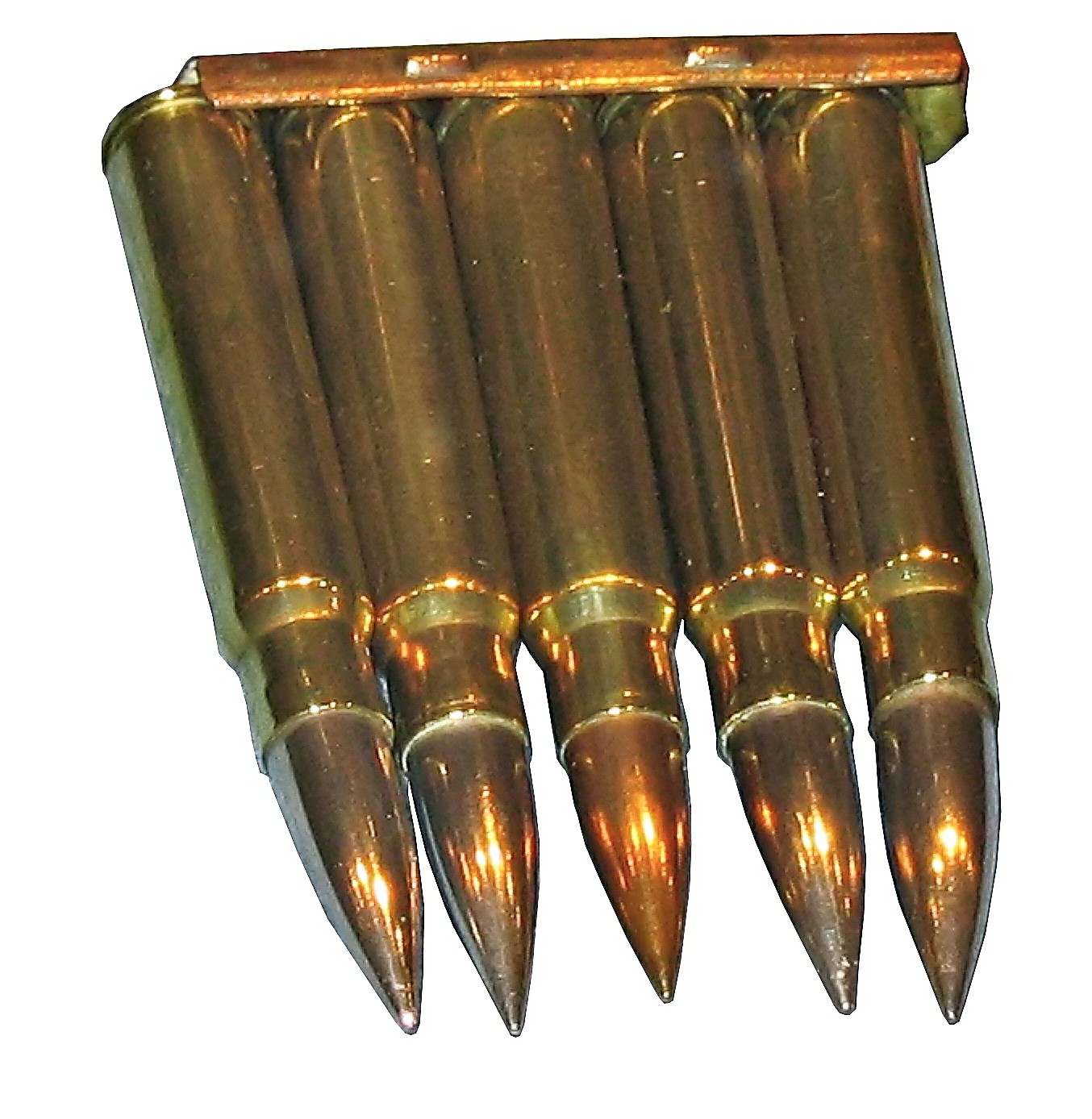
German World War I brass 5 round stripper clip with 7.92×57mm JS cartridges

The controlled-feed Mauser M98 bolt-action system is based on previous 19th-century Mauser bolt-action rifle designs and is a simple, strong, safe, and well-thought-out design intended to negate as many failure modes as possible and which inspired other military and hunting/sporting rifle designs that became available during the 20th century. A drawback of the M98 system is that it cannot be cheaply mass-produced very easily.

==== Features ====
The M98 system consists of a receiver that serves as the system's shroud and a bolt group of which the bolt body has three locking lugs, two large main lugs - of which the left is slotted - at the bolt head and a third safety lug at the rear of the bolt, which serves as a backup in case the primary locking lugs failed. This third lug is a distinctive feature and was not present on previous Mauser bolt-action designs. The two main locking lugs are positioned opposed to each other and display a locking surface of 56 mm^{2} (0.087 in^{2}), whilst the third safety lug normally plays no part in locking the action to avoid asymmetric and hence unbalanced bolt thrust forces.The diameter of the M98 system receiver ring was also enlarged to 35.8 mm (1.41 in) diameter compared to previous Mauser "small ring" bolt-action designs that had 33 mm (1.30 in) diameter receiver rings for additional strength and safety. Accordingly, the barrel shank was enlarged to 28 mm (1.10 in) diameter with 15.88 mm (0.625 in) of threaded area at 12 threads per inch compared to previous Mauser "small shank" bolt-action designs that had 24.9 mm (0.98 in) diameter with 16.38 mm (0.645 in) of threaded area at 12 threads per inch barrel shanks for additional strength. The bolt handle is permanently attached to the bolt and, on the Gewehr 98, is straight and protrudes out for optimal leverage.

Another distinctive feature of the M98 system is the controlled-feed mechanism, consisting of a large, non-rotating claw extractor that engages the cartridge case rim as soon as the round leaves the magazine and firmly holds the cartridge case until the round is ejected by the ejector, mounted inside the receiver. Combined with a slight bolt retraction at the first stage of the bolt opening cycle, caused by the cammed surface on the rear receiver bridge, this results in a positive cartridge case extraction. The M98 bolt-action will cycle correctly, irrespective of the way the rifle is moved or positioned during the bolt cycling action or if the cartridge has been fired or not. Only if the bolt is not brought back far enough, sharply enough, in a controlled round feed bolt-action the cartridge case may not be cleanly ejected and a jam may result.

The bolt houses the firing pin mechanism that cocks when the bolt is opened, and the cocking piece protrudes visually and tactilely from the rear of the bolt to indicate the action is cocked. A cocking shroud lock that was not present on previous Mauser bolt-action designs was added. The distance the firing pin needs to travel was decreased to reduce and hence improve lock time – the amount of time between initiating the firing sequence by pulling the trigger and the firing pin striking the primer that ignites the propellant contained in the 7.92×57mm Mauser cartridge.

The M98 action features two large oval shaped gas relief holes on the bottom of the bolt, which when catastrophic failures like a primer, cartridge rupture or detonation occur relieve high pressure gases into the magazine, and a gas shield on the bolt sleeve. Military M98 systems feature a secondary gas relief where gas is routed down the locking lug raceway to a thumb hole cutout exit on left side of receiver. Civilian M98 systems often lack the thumb hole cut out, as the ammunition feeding is generally simplified to single round feeding only. These safety features are designed to route escaping gas out of the bolt and eventual debris away from the operator's face.

The M98 bolt group can be easily removed from the receiver simply by rotating the safety lever to the 12 o'clock position and pulling out the bolt stop lever, located at the rear left wall of the receiver, and then operate the action and continue rearward bolt travel past the bolt stop. The metal disc inlay in the stock functions as a bolt disassembly tool.

Many metal parts of the Gewehr 98 were blued, a process in which steel is partially protected against rust by a layer of magnetite (Fe_{3}O_{4}). Such a thin black oxide layer provides minimal protection against rust or corrosion, unless also treated with a water-displacing oil to reduce wetting and galvanic corrosion. From 1905 until 1945 the German military used Ballistol intended for cleaning, lubricating, and protecting metallic, wooden and leather firearms parts.

==== Safety ====
A three-position flag style safety attached at the rear of the bolt which operating lever can be flicked from right (safety on, bolt locked) to middle (safety on, bolt can be opened for reloading), to left (ready to fire), but only when the rifle is cocked; otherwise, the safety will not move. In the right most position, the safety blocks the firing pin and when the trigger is pulled, the firing pin will not be released due to the safety. Additionally, a protruding piece prevents the bolt handle from being lifted and thus prevents the bolt from being pulled back as the locking lugs are still engaged. When the safety is in the middle position, the sights are obstructed and the firing pin is still blocked and thus the trigger is still dead. However, the aforementioned protruding piece is absent, and the bolt can be cycled, allowing for loading and removal of the bolt for cleaning. The left most position is the fire position and a cut out permits movement of the firing pin and the bolt can be cycled. The safety catch lever is quite large, making it easy to operate, but posing a problem for mounting telescopic sights low above the receiver whilst retaining good operability of the safety catch lever.

==== Ammunition feeding ====
The internal magazine of the M98 system consists of an integral box machined to match the cartridge for which the rifle was being chambered, with a detachable floorplate, that can hold up to 5 rifle cartridges. The German military M98 system internal magazine boxes feature an internal magazine length of 84 mm (3.31 in) to store 82 mm (3.23 in) maximal overall length 7.92×57mm Mauser cartridges without dimensional issues. The cartridges are stored in the magazine box in a staggered column at a stacking angle of 30 degrees, so viewed from the end, three cartridges touching each other form the points of an equilateral triangle. The magazine can be loaded with single rounds by pushing the cartridges into the receiver top opening or via stripper clips. Each stripper clip can hold 5 rounds to fill the magazine and is inserted into clip guides machined into the rear receiver bridge. After loading, the empty clip is ejected when the bolt is closed. The clip is ejected because it has two small protrusions on either side, which are the only points of contact with the clip guide. These protrusions rest at the top of the guide, while the lower part of the clip is narrower than the guide itself. As the bolt moves forward, it pushes the bottom of the clip out, causing the clip to rotate around the protrusions until it is fully ejected. For easier loading a crescent shaped thumb hole cutout is present at the left rear of the receiver top. The magazine can be unloaded by operating the bolt (the safety should, for safety reasons, be set to the middle position for this) or, in case of mechanical problems, by opening the magazine floorplate, which is flush with the stock, with the help of a cartridge tip. Alternatively cartridges can be loaded singly directly into the chamber, as is standard on military rifles of the period, since the extractor is spring-loaded and designed so the extractor claw "pops" over the rim of the cartridge on closing.

The Gewehr 98 had no magazine cut-off mechanism, which when engaged permits the feeding and extraction of single cartridges only while keeping the cartridges in the magazine in reserve. Like the M98 system Mauser magazine fed bolt-action systems were generally not manufactured with magazine cut-offs, the Ottoman Mauser Model 1893 variant being the exception.

==== Modern civilian offsprings of the M98 system ====
Though the production of the M98 system for the German military ceased at the end of World War II in 1945, the production of new Mauser M 98 and Mauser M 98 Magnum rifles for civil users has continued using both repurposed military systems as well as newly made systems from several manufacturers worldwide. New systems were being manufactured not only by the Mauser GmbH in Germany, but also by FN in Belgium, Zbrojovka Brno in Czechoslovakia and Zastava in Yugoslavia.

The Mauser-Werke GmbH stopped the production of the M98 system in the 1960s and replaced it with the Model 66, a new construction. However, after going through several ownership changes and a name change, the reconstituted Mauser Jagdwaffen GmbH resumed the production of M98 rifles in 1999 according to original drawings and in style of the interwar-period Mauser hunting rifles. These rifles retail (2009) for approximately EUR 6,800 for the basic Mauser M 98 version, but the addition of (luxury) options can make these rifles much more expensive.

Several other gun manufacturers and custom gun builders also currently produce new M98 system clones or M98 inspired bolt-action hunting/sporting rifles. Desirable features of the M98 system, like its controlled feeding, were carried over to a host of later bolt-action designs. These designs feature technical alterations to simplify production and technical and ergonomic improvements.

=== Trigger ===
The rifle had a two-stage trigger with considerable take up before the trigger engages the sear. This feature aids in preventing premature firing during stressful (combat) situations. Additionally, the two stage trigger allows for a much smoother trigger pull and release of the firing pin.

=== Sights ===
Originally the Gewehr 98 sight line had an open post type front sight, and a curved tangent-type rear sight with a V-shaped rear notch, known as the Lange Visier (Lange sight after its designer Lieutenant Colonel Lange). The rear sight was graduated for 1888 pattern M/88 cartridges from 200 m (220 yd) to 2,000 m (2,200 yd) in 100 m (110 yd) increments. The M/88 cartridge was loaded with full metal jacket projectiles of the round-nosed type.

The standard open iron sight aiming elements consisted of relatively coarse rugged aiming elements making the sightline suitable for rough handling and low light usage, but less suitable for aiming at small point targets. The tracks of the rear sight obstructed the view to the sides during aiming. The sights were designed with distant area fire targets like charging horseman units in mind, so the standard iron sight line could be calibrated for very long ranges. Military doctrine in the late 19th and early 20th centuries considered firing at distant area targets, where an officer would call out the range and the soldiers shot in volley, normal.

German government driven efforts to improve the performance of the military M/88 ammunition and the service arms in which the M/88 was used resulted in the design by the Gewehr-Prüfungskommission and adaptation in 1903 of the dimensionally redesigned 7.92×57mm Mauser chambering. Besides the chambering, the bore (designated as "S-bore") was also dimensionally redesigned. The 1903 pattern 7.92×57mm Mauser S Patrone (S ball cartridge) was loaded with a lighter 9.9 grams (153 gr), pointed Spitzgeschoß (spitzer bullet) of 8.2 mm (0.323 in) diameter and more powerful double-base (based on nitrocellulose and nitroglycerin) smokeless powder. With the improved ballistic coefficient of the new spitzer bullet, the 1903 pattern cartridge had an improved maximum effective range and a flatter trajectory, and was therefore less critical of range estimation compared to the M/88 cartridge. With the introduction of the S Patrone the rear sight graduation was changed accordingly and could be regulated from 400 m (440 yd) to 2,000 m (2,200 yd) in 100 m (110 yd) increments.

While the modified sight line for 1903 pattern 7.92×57mm Mauser S Patrone IS cartridges was calibrated for a minimum zero distance of 400 m (440 yd) and can result in hitting high when using the open post front sight and V-shaped rear notch at close range, the pillars formed by the tracks of the rear sight allow closer targets to be quickly bracketed between the "goalposts", a sighting method that automatically compensates for the high point of aim using the normal sighting method at sub-400 m (440 yd) ranges.

=== Stock ===
The Gewehr 98 oil finished rifle stock features a semi-pistol grip. A top handguard was standard on all rifles and extended from the front of the rear sight base terminating just ahead of the bottom barrel band. A steel cross bolt was mounted to distribute the forces and hence the effects of recoil on the stock bedding, reducing the chance to split the stock. The stock featured a quick detachable sling swivel on the underside of the butt stock, a top swivel located underneath the bottom barrel band, and a parade hook mounted on the underside of the top H-style barrel band. The prewar stocks were produced from walnut wood and were aged for an average of three years to allow the wood to stabilize. Beginning in 1917, walnut shortages necessitated the use of beech wood. The late-war production beech stocks were less durable and heavier than the original walnut stocks.

=== Accessories ===
The rifle was issued with a leather carrying sling. During the duration of World War I, due to a shortage of leather, slings were produced out of canvas.

The rifle was able to fire rifle grenades. Various attachable rifle grenade launcher models were designed during World War I.

German Seitengewehr 98/05 bayonet used during World War I

The Gewehr 98 was designed to be used with a bayonet. For this the rifle had a H-style top barrel-band with a 4.5 cm (1.8 in) long bayonet lug. The long bearing surface on the Gewehr 98 bayonet lug eliminated the addition of a muzzle ring. The advantage of this solution lies in the fact that muzzle rings can interfere with barrel oscillation which can significantly impede the accuracy of a rifle. The rifle was originally issued with the Seitengewehr 98 pattern bayonet. This épée style bayonet has a 500 mm (19.7 in) long quillback blade. By the end of 1905, this bayonet began to be replaced with the more robust and practical Seitengewehr 98/05, with a 370 mm (14.6 in) blade. It was called the "Butcher Blade" by the Allies due to its distinctive shape, and was initially intended for artillerymen and engineers as a chopping tool as well as a weapon. Towards the end of World War I, the 250 mm (9.8 in) blade Seitengewehr 84/98 was introduced as an economy measure and because the longer models were impractical in narrow trenches; this model became standard issue during the Weimar Republic and Third Reich. Serrated, saw-backed versions of the standard patterns intended to be used as tools were carried by German Pioniere (pioneers).

== Variants ==
=== Sniper models ===
In the spring of 1915, it was decided to fit 15,000 Gewehr 98 rifles, selected for being exceptionally accurate during factory tests, with telescopic sights for sniper use, though the Gewehr 98 was not designed for use with aiming optics. The Scharfschützen-Gewehr 98 (sniper rifle 98) was officially adapted in 1915 featuring for the period advanced 4× Görtz or Zeiss telescopic sights. These sights were mounted offset to the left to allow stripper clip loading of the rifle and the sights had a bullet drop compensation sight drum out to 1,000 m range in 100 m increments. The bolt handle had to be turned-down from its original straight design. In the stock, a recess had to be made to accommodate the turned-down bolt handle modification.

The wartime Scharfschützen-Gewehr 98 program intended to regularize equipment issued for snipers but failed. The telescopic sights used consisted of 2.5×, 3× and 4× models, made by manufactures like Görtz, Gérard, Oigee, Zeiss, Hensoldt, Voigtländer and various civilian models from manufacturers like Bock, Busch and Füss. Several different mountings produced by various manufacturers were used. Even with a turned-down bolt handle (unless it is low-profile as is common practice with modern hunting rifles), optics mounted low directly above the receiver will not leave enough space between the rifle and the telescopic sight body for unimpaired operation of the bolt or three-position safety catch lever. This ergonomic problem was solved by mounting the telescopic sight relatively high above the receiver. By the end of World War I, 18,421 Gewehr 98 rifles were converted and equipped with telescopic sights and issued to German snipers.

=== Karabiner 98a ===
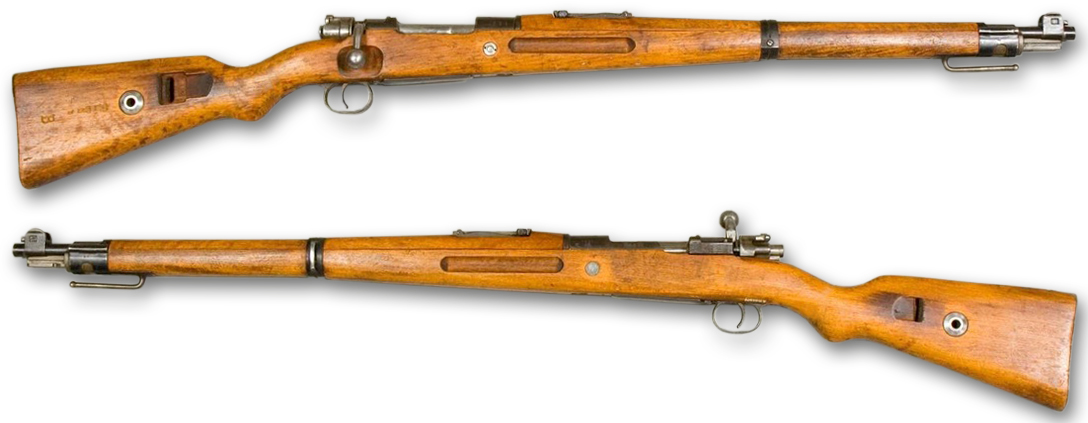
Karabiner 98AZ / Karabiner 98a

Not to be confused with the later Karabiner 98k or the earlier Karabiner 98A (uppercase A), the Karabiner 98a (Kar 98a) was a shorter version of the Gewehr 98 originally made for cavalry and support unit use. The Karabiner 98A, adopted in February 1902, had a considerably shorter barrel than the Gewehr 98 and was also lighter at 3.42 kg (7.5 lb) empty. Experiments in 1904 with Karabiner 98A carbines rechambered for the S Patrone cartridge showed excessive recoil and muzzle flash problems, leading to the suspension of production in 1905. The Gewehr Prüfungs Kommission (GPK) started developing a new carbine with a longer barrel and a different stock to address these problems; by the mid-summer of 1907, the longer barrelled prototype carbines showed more acceptable recoil and muzzle blast behavior with the S Patrone.

In January 1908, the Karabiner Model 1898 AZ (Kar 98AZ) was accepted for service. The new features were a small diameter (33 mm (1.30 in)) receiver ring, tapered rather than stepped barrel contour, an L-shaped stacking rod attached to the stock near the muzzle, and a turned-down bolt handle and recess in the stock in the same fashion as the Gewehr 98s sniper variant. The "AZ" stands for "Aufpflanz-und-Zusammensetzvorrichtung", meaning "with bayonet attachment point and stacking rod". At the end of World War I about 1,500,000 short rifles had been produced. In 1923, the AZ was renamed to 'a', as Germany sought to distinguish the model from the newer 'b' and 'k' models.

During World War I, the Karabiner 98a was issued to light infantry, cavalry, mountain troops, and later to assault troops. It was liked because it was lighter and shorter than the Gewehr 98, and was thus better suited for use in trench assaults.

=== Karabiner 98b ===
The Karabiner 98b was not technically another "carbine" variant, but rather was a rifle designated as a carbine to comply with the terms of the Treaty of Versailles which only allowed Germany to produce carbines. The Karabiner Model 1898b was introduced in 1923. The Karabiner 98b had a tangent rear sight as opposed to the original "Lange" ramp sight, a wider lower band with side sling attachment bar, a side butt attachment point for a sling, and a turned down bolt handle. It was otherwise merely a modified form of the Gewehr 98, from which the Karabiner 98k was derived.

=== Variants comparison ===
| Feature | Gewehr 98 (1898) | Karabiner 98AZ / Karabiner 98a (1908) | Karabiner 98b (1923) | Karabiner 98k (1935) |
|---|---|---|---|---|
| Overall length | 1,250 mm (49.21 in) | 1,090 mm (42.91 in) | 1,250 mm (49.21 in) | 1,110 mm (43.70 in) |
| Barrel length | 740 mm (29.13 in) | 600 mm (23.62 in) | 740 mm (29.13 in) | 600 mm (23.62 in) |
| Sight radius | 650 mm (25.59 in) | 500 mm (19.69 in) | 650 mm (25.59 in) | 500 mm (19.69 in) |
| Weight | 4.09 kg (9.0 lb) | 3.7 kg (8.2 lb) | 4.0 kg (8.8 lb) | 3.7–4.1 kg (8.2–9.0 lb) |
| Other notable features | straight bolt handle, Lange ramp rear sight | turned down bolt handle and recess in the stock, L-shaped stacking rod near the muzzle, small ring action, tangent rear sight, wing guarded front post | turned down bolt handle and recess in the stock, tangent rear sight | turned down bolt handle and recess in the stock, tangent rear sight |

== Combat service ==
The Gewehr 98 saw service primarily in World War I, as well as the Boxer Rebellion and the Herero Wars in the preceding years. As with all contemporary bolt-action rifles, it was a powerful and accurate rifle with long range that was poorly suited for the close quarter fighting of trench warfare. The considerable length of the rifle and the minimum sight setting of 400 meters (far in excess of the typical range in trench battles) were particular handicaps.

Its successor, the Karabiner 98k, would go on to be the standard rifle of the German infantry during World War II. Some Gewehr 98s also saw service in World War II, though many of these older rifles were converted to either 98b or 98k specifications.

== Military accuracy standard ==
For determining accuracy the German military fired a group of shots into a target and used statistics to calculate a hit probability. For this they drew a circle that disregards the hits on the outer part of the target and only count half of the hits (50% or R_{50}) on the inner part of the circle. They then used both the vertical and horizontal measurements of the reduced shotgroup to measure accuracy. When the R_{50} results are doubled the hit probability increases to 93.7%.

To pass the German military minimum accuracy standard a Gewehr 98 had to perform as follows.

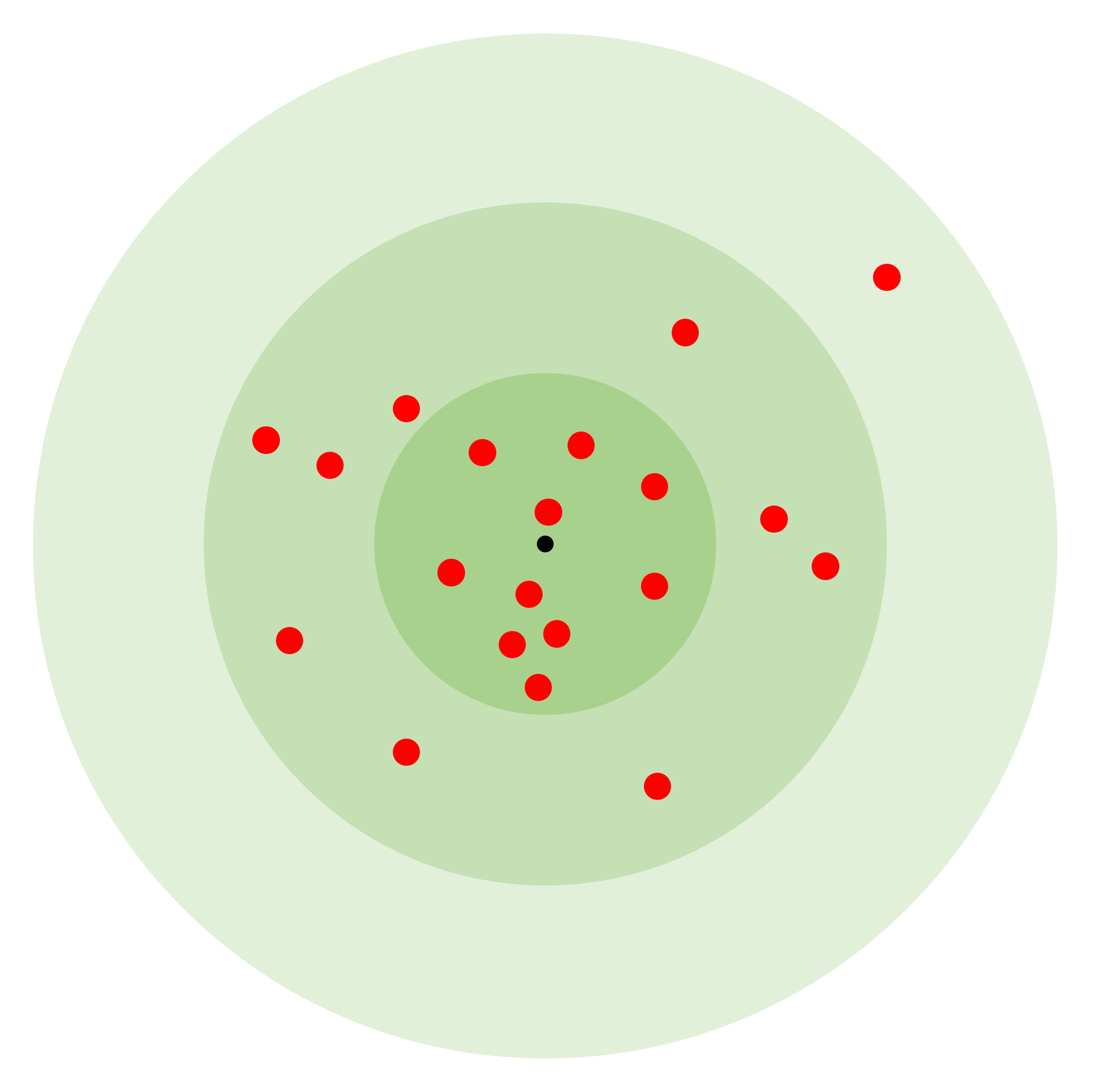
Circular error probable 20 hits distribution example

Minimum acceptance standard for the Gewehr 98 with 198 gr s.S. Patrone 7.92×57mm ammunition
| Range | Vertical accuracy of fire (R_{50}) | Horizontal accuracy of fire (R_{50}) |
|---|---|---|
| 100 m (109 yd) | 6 cm (2.4 in) | 4 cm (1.6 in) |
| Range | Vertical accuracy of fire (R_{93.7}) | Horizontal accuracy of fire (R_{93.7}) |
| 100 m (109 yd) | 12 cm (4.7 in) | 8 cm (3.1 in) |

To pass the minimum acceptance standard 3 out of 5 shots had to place within a 8 x 12 cm rectangle at 100 m (3.1 x 4.1 MOA), whilst all 5 out of 5 shots had to be within a 12 cm circle at 100 m in order for the rifle to be accepted for service. These requirements were carried over for the Karabiner 98k, Germany's standard service rifle during WW2.

For reference a 1 minute of arc (MOA) circle at 100 m (109 yd) has a diameter of 2.9 cm (1.1 in), therefore 6 cm (2.4 in) at 100 m (109 yd) equals 2.06 MOA, and 12 cm (4.7 in) at 100 m (109 yd) equals 4.12 MOA. In short a maximum dispersion of no more than 4.1 MOA was allowed.

The circular error probable method employed by the Germans and other European militaries cannot be converted and is not comparable to the common US methods (groupsize of 5 or 10 successive shots fired at 100 yards) for determining accuracy, or the British method of four out of five successive shots fired at 100 feet must hit a rectangle measuring 1 inch wide × 1.5 inches high (the equivalent of 4.54 MOA).

According to pre World War I military instructions booklets new Gewehr 98 rifles firing the lighter WW1 154 grain S Patrone ball ammunition on average had 34 cm (13.4 in) (3.9 MOA) vertical dispersion and 28 cm (11.0 in) (3.2 MOA) horizontal dispersion at 300 m (328 yd). New Karabiner 98AZ / Karabiner 98a (small receiver ring, shorter version of the Gewehr 98) firing S Patrone ball ammunition on average had 43 cm (16.9 in) (4.9 MOA) vertical dispersion and 34 cm (13.4 in) (3.9 MOA) horizontal dispersion at 300 m (328 yd). Individual weapons can shoot better or worse than these averages.

For comparison the acceptance accuracy requirements for various US service rifles at 100 yd (91.4 m) as well as the British Lee Enfield No.4 Mk.I rifle at 100 ft (30.5 m).

US & British service rifle minimum acceptance accuracy requirements
| Rifle (design year) | Range | Shotgroup diameter |
|---|---|---|
| M1903 Springfield (1903) | 100 yd (91 m) | 3 in (7.6 cm) [3 MOA] |
| Lee–Enfield No.4 (1941) | 100 ft (30 m) | Four of five shots within 1 in wide by 1.5 in high 2.5 cm × 3.8 cm rectangle [3.03 x 4.54 MOA] |
| M1 Garand (1936) | 100 yd (91 m) | 5 in (12.7 cm) [5 MOA] |
| M14 (1959) | 100 yd (91 m) | 5.5 in (14.0 cm) [5.5 MOA] |
| M16 series (1964) | 100 yd (91 m) | 4.5 in (11.4 cm) [4.5 MOA] |

For reference a 1 MOA circle at 100 yd (91 m) has a diameter of 1.047 in (2.7 cm), 3 in (7.6 cm) at 100 yd (91 m) equals 2.9 MOA, and 5 in (12.7 cm) at 100 yd (91 m) equals 4.8 MOA

In summary the accuracy standards of the Gewehr 98 and most other service rifles used in World War I and later were similar.

== The Gewehr 98 after World War I ==
=== Sporting and hunting ===
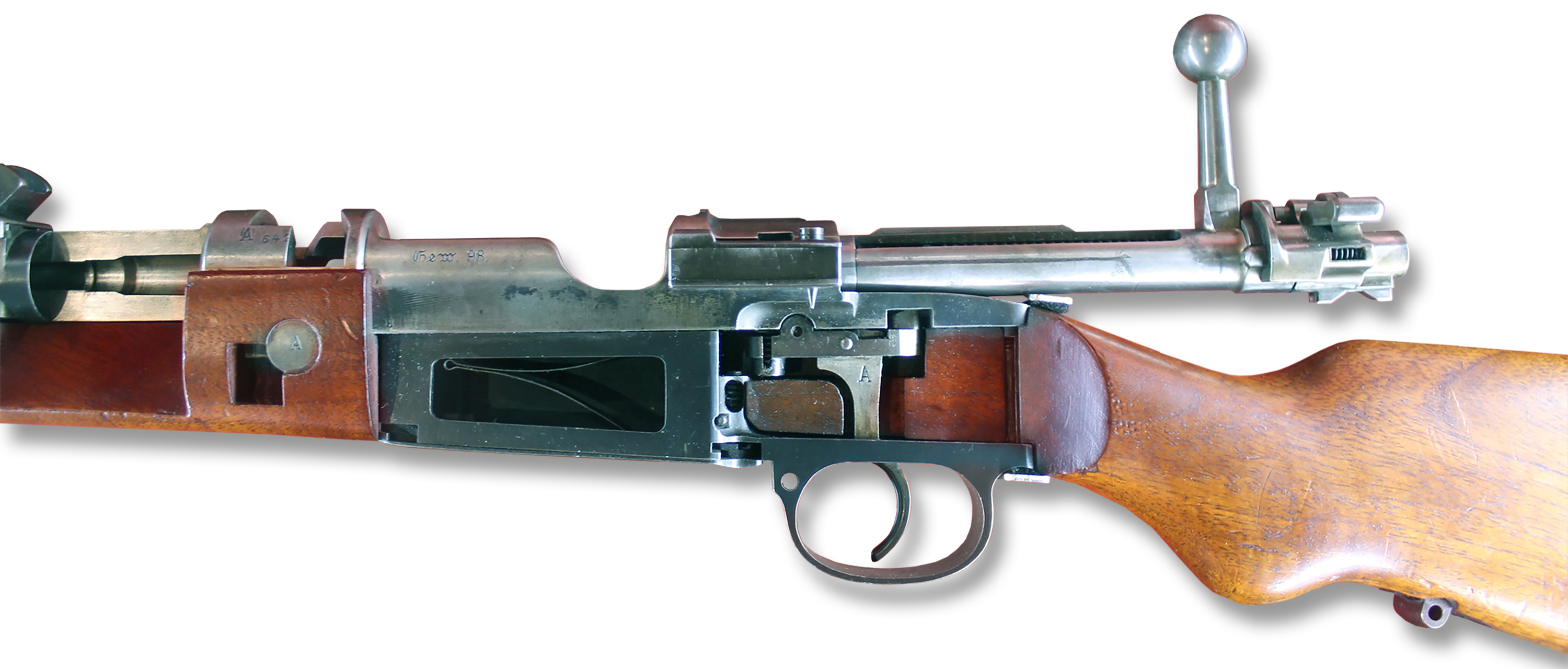
Gewehr 98

==== M 98 ====
The Mauser M 98 was a civilian version adapted for and hunting and other sporting purposes of the Gewehr 98 service rifle. Vaguely similar to the latter rifle in appearance, the M 98 was offered in many different hunting chamberings, not like the original service rifle. The Mauser M 98 series offered several features and factory options, that are also typical for sporterised ex-service rifles, ranging from various technical departures from the basic Mauser service rifle it was based on to luxury wood grades, (gold) inlays, engravings and surface treatments like color case hardening. Some of the available options were originally developed and introduced by John Rigby & Co. on Rigby Mauser hunting rifles.

==== M 98 magnum ====
John Rigby & Co. commissioned Mauser to develop the M 98 magnum action in the early 1900s. It was designed to function with the large sized cartridges normally used to hunt Big Five game and other dangerous game species. For this specialized type of hunting, where absolute reliability of the rifle under adverse conditions is very important, the controlled-feed M 98 system remains the standard by which other action designs are judged. In 1911 John Rigby & Co. introduced the .416 Rigby cartridge that due to its dimensions could only be used in the M 98 magnum action.

==== Rechambered rifles ====
After World War I, the Treaty of Versailles left Germany extremely constricted in terms of military power. Civilians were not allowed to have any use of standard military weapons or ammunition. Since the 7.92×57mm Mauser round was so stout and great for hunting, people did not want to give up on it, so a redesign of the cartridge was made for the civilian market resulting in the 8×60mm S featuring a new longer case. The 8×60mm S cartridge was kept under 84.4 mm (3.32 in) overall length to fit the cartridge in standard military M98 magazine boxes without any modification.

The also rare 8×64mm S cartridge offers a comparable rechambering option for Mauser Gewehr 98 and Karabiner 98k rifles sporting 8mm S-bores. Due to its larger case capacity the 8×64mm S chambering offers better ballistic performance than the 8×60mm S. Some custom rifles were made using Mauser 98's and rechambering them for the 9×57mm Mauser.

Since the purpose for these rifles was hunting and sporting, the bolt handle was professionally bent down, gradually the bent bolt handle became the standard and replaced the older straight style (though that was of course not always the case). The standard military sights were replaced by a 100 m sight, along with a flip-up on the rear sight for 200 m. The military stocks were replaced by newer ones that did not include the extra length of stock needed for the bayonet lug.

Due to their age, the sporter rifles are extremely rare and the 8×60mm S, 8×64mm S and 9×57mm Mauser cartridges are nearly obsolete, as only few mainstream ammunition manufacturers along with some other smaller companies continue to produce them, however, there exists some uses for them as inexpensive, game-hunting guns.

Also, many Gewehr 98 rifles acquired as trophies by Allied forces during the war and brought to the US were converted to the 8mm-06 wildcat cartridge, a modification of the original 8×57mm IS chambering to 8×63mm S to accommodate the use of the plentiful .30-06 Springfield brass for reloading, with 8mm (.323 caliber) bullets. Such conversions are indistinguishable from unmodified rifle without careful examination, and can be quite dangerous if fired with the shorter 8×57mm ammunition, as the cartridge case will stretch to fit the elongated chamber and possibly rupture in the process, which causes a potentially highly dangerous high pressure propellant gas leakage. However, the Mauser M 98 action is designed specifically to direct gas away from the shooter in the event of a case rupture.

In the 21st century the US based company Rhineland Arms started to produce .45 ACP conversion kits for the Mauser action using M1911 pistol magazines.

==== Shotgun conversions ====
Many were converted to shotguns, typically in 12 and 16-gauge, as well as some in 20-gauge. In making the conversion, both main locking lugs were typically removed. The magazine was altered to allow a single shell in reserve. Many authorities recommend against firing these guns, particularly with modern magnum shotshells.

=== Weimar Republic and Nazi Germany ===
The Weimar Republic, the successor state to the German Empire, implemented a program designed to update their remaining supplies of Gewehr 98 rifles for the Reichswehr in the years following World War I. Rifles allowed into service with the early Weimar security forces were stamped with a "1920" marking on their receiver ring. Further updates to Weimar-era Gewehr 98's often included the replacement of the Lange Visier rear sight with a standard Karabiner 98k-style rear sight. Many of the Gew 98 were also converted to the Kar 98b configuration, with a turned bolt handle, new tangent leaf sight and a hole cut through the side of the stock to accommodate a Karabiner 98k-style side-mounted sling system, but some Karabiner 98b were also produced from new parts. Some of these rifles saw use in World War II but mostly in second line units because the shortened and improved Karabiner 98k was the standard-issue rifle by that time. Gewehr 98 and Karabiner 98b were sometimes rebuilt to the Karabiner 98k configuration. In 1924 the Gewehr 98 was developed into the Mauser Standardmodell rifle.

During World War II the Germans captured German-made Yugoslav Model 1898 carbines and rifles and designated them Gewehr 298 (j) and Karabiner 492 (j). The Volkssturm ("People's Militia") also made use of the Gewehr 98 and Kar 98a; out of all their mixed arsenal the Gewehr 98 was probably the best since it used standard 7.92×57mm IS rounds and a man trained on a Karabiner 98k could transition over to the Gewehr 98 easily since the actions of both rifles were the same.

After 1945, some ex-German Karabiner 98b were also taken into French Army service, the only modification being the use of the sling of the MAS-36 rifle.

=== Ottoman Empire ===
The Ottoman Empire bought the Mauser Model 1903. The Mauser 1903 was a modified version Gewehr 98. The Lange Visier sight was replaced by a tangent leaf sight, the nose cap was simplified, the rifle could be fitted with older Ottoman M1890 bayonets. The weapon had curved arm on its bolt stop to block the cartridge clip when the cartridges are stripped into the magazine. It also had a larger receiver and a longer cocking cam and firing pin than the German variant. After the adoption of the long rifle, 200,000 were received before 1905. 406 Marine-gewehre were delivered to the Ottoman Navy in 1904, 7,617 to the Gendarmerie in Ottoman Macedonia. 1,100 more, modified to fire spitzer bullets and sometimes known as M1910, were ordered in 1910. The Ottoman customs also received some. The Model 1905 carbine was produced between 1903 and 1906. 30,000 M1908 carbines were delivered in 1908 and 1909.

The Model 1903 saw combat during the Italo-Turkish War, the Balkan Wars, World War I and the Turkish War of Independence. After World War I, most of these weapons were modified to fire the 7.92×57mm Mauser round. Many of the long rifles were refurbished as Mauser Model 1938 short rifles. Models 1903 and 1905 were still in service in the 1960s, large numbers of Gewehr 98 rifles were also given to the Ottoman Empire both during and after World War I, including the majority of 1916 Waffenfabrik Oberndorf production. Many of these rifles were converted to the "M38" standard by the Republic of Turkey in the years before, during, and after World War I. Today these rifles are widely available in North America along with other Turkish Mausers. Careful observation is usually needed to tell an Ex-Gewehr 98 apart from the myriad of other common M38-standard Mausers.

=== Czechoslovakia ===
After Czechoslovakia was founded in 1918, they bought 57 000 Gewehr 98 rifles from Netherlands (the so-called Netherlands block), which was acquired from disarmed German troops on Netherlands territory. After examination of Gewehr 98 Czechoslovakia developed own improved version known as Puška vz. 24 (Rifle mod. 24). That rifle, produced from 1924 to 1942, became the standard weapon of Czechoslovak forces before WWII and up to the 1960s. It was also commercially successful - among users were Romania, China, Bolivia, Turkey, Japan, Spain, Iran (also locally produced under licence), Ecuador, Brasil, Lithuania, Yugoslavia; after WWII also Israel, North Vietnam and many others).

=== Spanish Civil War ===
The rifle saw some usage in the Spanish Civil War, mostly in the hands of Generalissimo Franco's Nationalists and German volunteer legions. Most of these rifles were bought and exported to the United States as cheap sporting rifles in the 1960s by Interarmco.

=== Poland ===
After the Second Polish Republic got its independence from the German Empire the Polish government got control over the state arsenal in former Danzig. The tools and machine park was moved to Warsaw to set up a state arsenal to equip the new Polish army. The machine park was set up to produce German G98 rifles and Kar98AZ carbines. A nearly unchanged version of the G98 was produced an accepted by the Polish army as Karabin wz.1898 abbreviated and marked G98 or W98 for infantry use. In 1921 a Polish version of the German Kar98AZ was produced for the cavalry accepted as Karabinek wz. 1898 abbreviated and marked K98 a remarkable difference is the strengthen staking hook. Problems with this carbine surfaced including intense muzzle blast and flash. In 1939 the K98 was phased out in favor to the K29 a Polish version of the Czech vz. 24 this carbine was not satisfactory either. This led to the development of the K98a.

=== Israel ===
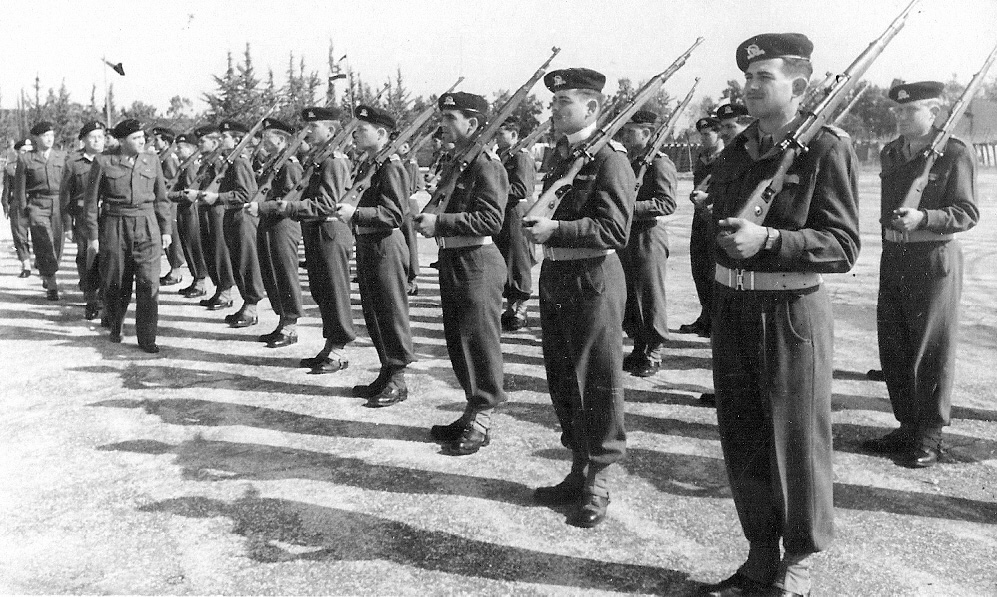
Mauser rifles in service with the Israel Defense Forces, c. 1954

During the formation of the state of Israel in the aftermath of World War II, the Haganah acquired substantial numbers of Karabiner 98k rifles from any European sources they could find. Some of these rifles were converted Gewehr 98 rifles, which aside from the Imperial German markings are identical to all other Israeli Mausers. Like other Israeli Mausers, most of these rifles were rebarreled for 7.62×51mm NATO after that round was adopted as the Israeli standard in 1958.

=== Vietnam ===
Vietcong improvised Danzig Mauser 1898 (M98) with magazine and hack saw blade for mag spring.

== Non-German Gewehr 98 derivatives ==
Many non-German military service rifles and carbines were derived from and/or based on the Mauser M98 bolt-action system. Some of these were German-made by various contractors other than Mauser:

- M1902 and M1936 Mexican in 7×57mm Mauser
- M1903 Turkish in 7.65×53mm Mauser
- M1907 Chinese in 6.8×57mm
- M1904 Portuguese in 6.5×58mm Vergueiro, 7×57mm Mauser and 7.92×57mm Mauser
- M1907 and M1908 Brazilian in 7×57mm Mauser
- M1909 Argentine in 7.65×53mm Mauser
- M1910 Serbian in 7×57mm Mauser
- Steyr Model 1912 Mauser for Mexico, Chile and Colombia, in 7×57mm Mauser

Following the collapse of the German Empire after World War I, many countries that were using Mauser models chose to develop, assemble, or modify their own rifle designs that were derived from and/or based on the Mauser M98 bolt-action:

- vz. 98/22 Often made from Gewehr 98 parts, rebuilt in the Zbrojovka Brno factory in Czechoslovakia.
- M1924 type Zhongzheng rifle Chinese in 7.92×57mm Mauser
- vz. 24 Czechoslovakia in 7.92×57mm Mauser, 7×57mm Mauser and 7.65×53mm Argentine
- vz. 33 Czechoslovakia in 7.92×57mm Mauser
- M1924 and M1930 made by the Belgian Fabrique Nationale
- M1935 Belgian in 7.65×53mm Mauser
- Karabinek wz. 1898 K98 Polish in 7.92×57mm Mauser
- Karabinek wz. 1929 Polish in 7.92×57mm Mauser
- Kb wz. 98a Polish in 7.92×57mm Mauser
- M1943 Spanish short (not to be confused with the M93 Spanish Mauser) in 7.92×57mm Mauser manufactured in the Spanish arsenals. Will have "La Coruña" or the Spanish Air Force Eagle stamped on the top of the receiver. Virtually identical to the Karabiner 98k.

The Winchester Model 54 and later the popular Winchester Model 70 are both based on the Mauser style action.

After World War II the Mauser M98 bolt-action system was used by Yugoslavia to design the Zastava M48 and Spain to design the FR8.

== Users ==
- Austria-Hungary: Used Repetiergewehr M.14 in World War I
- Argentina: 200,000 units bought in its Mauser 1909 variant form.
- Belgium: Post-WWI
- Charlie Kirk's assassin
- China: Most imported after the first world war
- Czechoslovakia
- Chile: 300 DWM Mauser Model 1907 short rifle and Steyr-made Model 1912s
- Denmark: Some converted as training rifles post-WWII
- Ethiopia: Acquired during the interwar period
- France: Some Kar 98a after WW1, Kar 98b after WW2.
- German Empire: Standard issue rifle.
- Weimar Republic: Kar98a and Kar98b versions, in compliance to restrictions set by the Treaty of Versailles.
- Nazi Germany: Used initially by snipers, and then by Volkssturm units.
- Irish Republican Army: In July 1921, a shipment of Gewehr 98s and Mauser C96 pistols were smuggled in to Waterford by Charles McGuinness.
- Mexico: Purchased Steyr-made Model 1907s between 1907 and 1910 and Steyr-made Model 1912s until 1914
- Ottoman Empire: Used a modified version Gewehr 98 known as the Mauser Model 1903 (also known as the Ottoman Mauser), after Turkish War of Independence most were converted to the '''M38'' standard by the Republic of Turkey.
- Peru: Bought around 50,000 Model 1909 rifles (export version of the Gew. 98) between 1910 and 1914.
- Poland: Ex-German rifles after WWI. Copies of the Kar98a and G98 were produced as Karabin wz. 98/W98 (Rifle 98) and Karabinek wz. 98/K98 (carbine 98) in Państwowa Fabryka Karabinów in Warsaw and Fabryka Broni in Radom
- Romania: A few Infanteriegewehr 98 and Karabiner 98AZ rifles were obtained as reparations from Germany after WWI
- Russian SFSR: Used by the Red Army during the Russian Civil War
- Spain
- Vatican City: replaced the Remington Rolling Block rifles in 1911 and then replaced by the K31 in 1956
- Vietnam
- Yugoslavia: Post-WWI, mostly converted to the M24B configuration. Those kept in service were designated Puška 7,9 mm M 98 (Gew 98) and Karabini 7,9 mm M98 (Kar 98AZ).

== See also ==
- List of infantry weapons of World War I

== Bibliography ==
- Ball, Robert W. D. (2011). Mauser Military Rifles of the World. Iola: Gun Digest Books. ISBN 9781440228926.
- Grant, Neil (20 March 2015). Mauser Military Rifles. Weapon 39. Osprey Publishing. ISBN 9781472805942.
- Smith, Joseph E. (1969). Small Arms of the World (11th ed.). Harrisburg, Pennsylvania: The Stackpole Company. ISBN 9780811715669.
- Storz, Dieter (2006). Gewehr & Karabiner 98: Die Schußwaffen 98 des deutschen Reichsheeres von 1898 bis 1918 (in German). Verlag Militaria. ISBN 978-3-902526-04-5.
- Storz, Dieter. Deutsche Militärgewehre (Band 1): Vom Werdergewehr bis zum Modell 71/84 (in German).
- Storz, Dieter. Deutsche Militärgewehre (Band 2): Schußwaffen 88 und 91 sowie Zielß und Fechtgewehre, seitengewehre und Patronentaschen (in German).
