= Steyr Model 1912 Mauser =

Repetiergewehr M.14
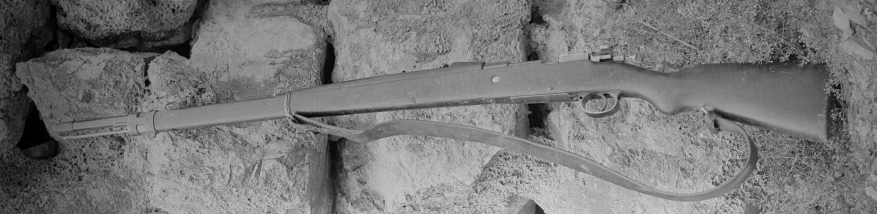
- An Austro-Hungarian M.14
- Type: Bolt-action rifle
- Place of origin: Austria-Hungary

Service history
- In service: 1914–1918 (Austria-Hungary)
- Used by: See Users
- Wars: Mexican Revolution; World War I

Production history
- Designed: 1912
- Manufacturer: Steyr

Specifications
- Mass: 3.97–4.11 kilograms (8.8–9.1 lb)
- Length: 1,245–1,247 millimetres (49.0–49.1 in)
- Barrel length: 736–740 millimetres (29.0–29.1 in)
- Cartridge: 7×57mm Mauser 7.92×57mm Mauser 7.62×51mm NATO
- Action: Bolt-action
- Feed system: 5-round stripper clip, internal magazine
- Sights: Iron sights adjustable to 1,800 metres (2,000 yd)

The Steyr Model 1912 were Gewehr 98 pattern bolt-action battle rifles produced by Steyr before World War I. They were designed for export market. During the war, they were also used by the Austro-Hungarian Army.

== Design ==
The rifle was a close copy of the Gewehr 98. It had a pistol grip stock. The rifle featured an "H"-type upper band. The sight was tangent-leaf, graduated to 1,800 metres (2,000 yd) or 2,000 metres (2,200 yd). The upper hand guard was shorter.

The carbine and short rifle versions had a turned-town bolt handle and were shorter, with sights graduated until 1,400 metres (1,500 yd).

The version pressed into Austrian service in 1914 was only modified by using a bigger sling swivel.

== Service ==
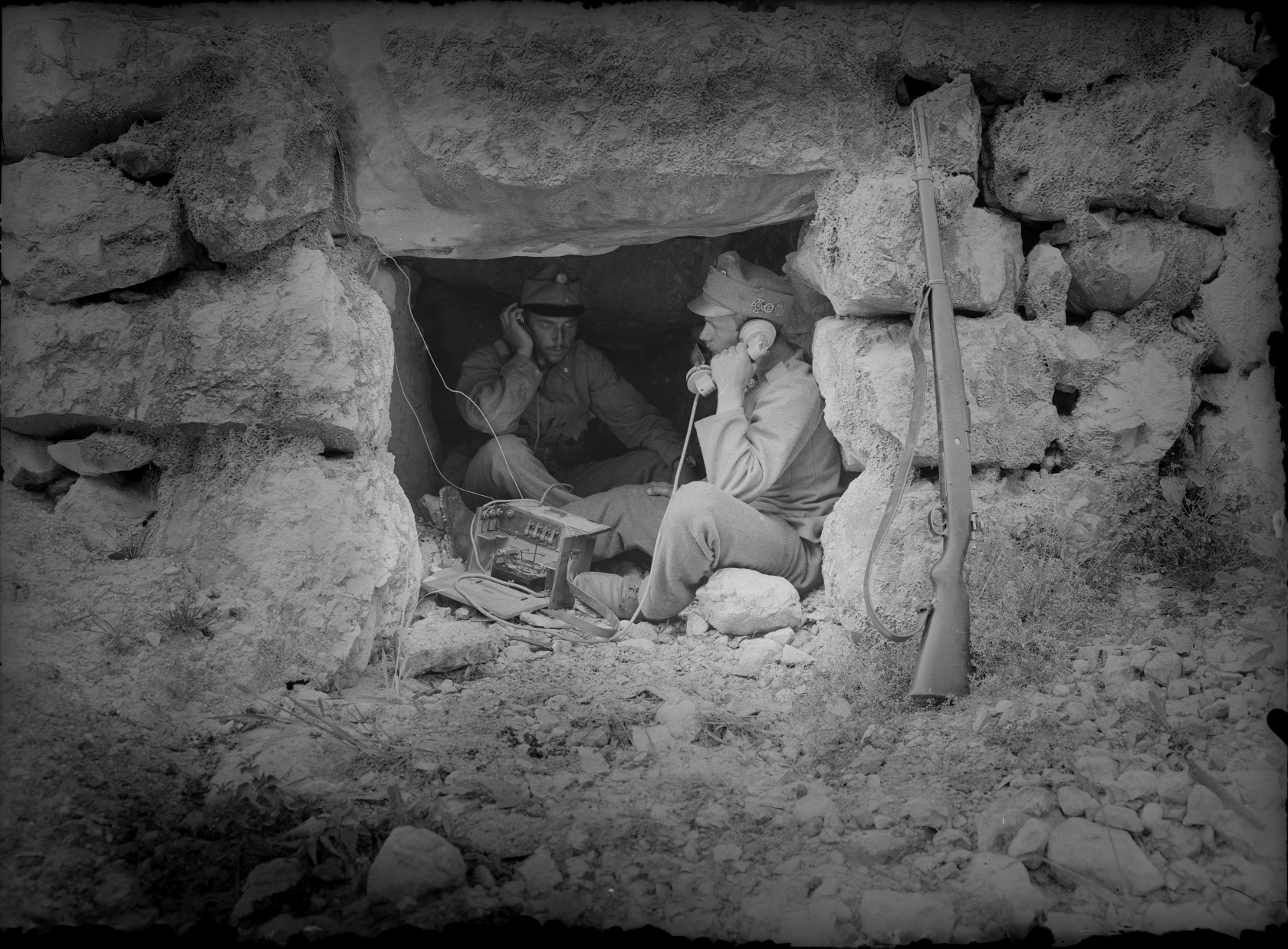
Austro-Hungarian field telephone crew equipped with the M.14 rifle at the Isonzo front in 1916

It was ordered by Mexico, Colombia, Chile, China, Mexican Model 1912 were used from 1913 by the Federal Army that fought during the Mexican Revolution. In 1914, 66,979 Mexican-contract rifles, 5,000 Colombian rifles and 43,100 Chilean rifles and carbines were pressed into Austria-Hungarian service as Repetiergewehr M.14.

The Czech vz. 98/22 was a close-copy of the Steyr M1912 and the vz. 12/33 carbine derives from the M1912 carbine. Some of the non-delivered Mexican Model 1912 rifles were modernized as 7.92×57mm Mauser Model 24B in Yugoslavia. In 1929, 5,000 M1912 short rifles, with a 560 millimetres (22 in) barrel, were manufactured by Československá zbrojovka Brno from Steyr spare parts. In 1961, Chilean M1912 were upgraded with a 7.62×51mm NATO 600 millimetres (24 in) barrel, as Modelo 12/61.

== Users ==
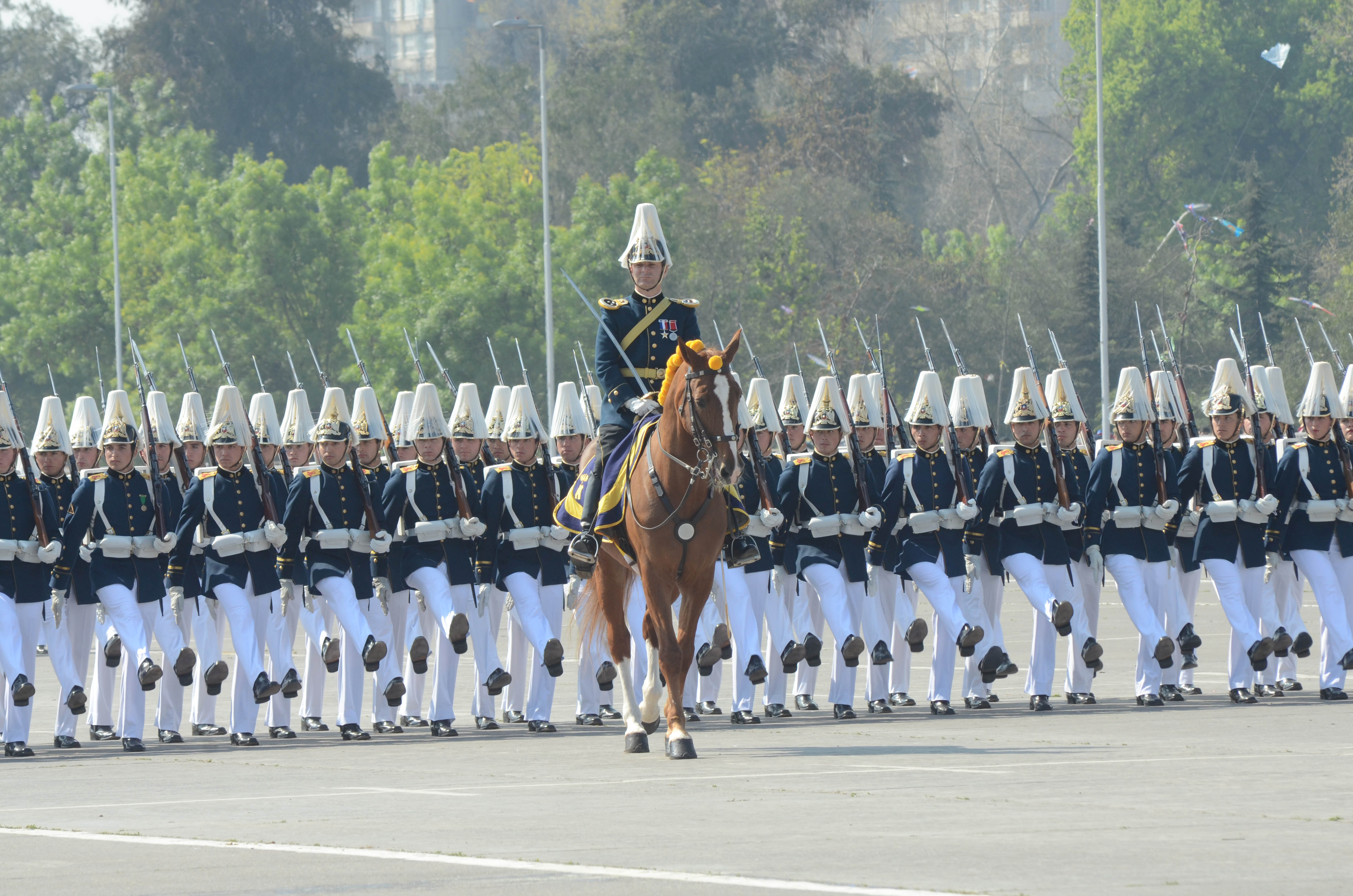
Chilean soldiers with M1912 rifles during the Great Military Parade of Chile in 2014.

- Austria-Hungary: Repetiergewehr M.14
- Chile: Modelo 1912 and Model 12/61
- Republic of China (1912-1949): ?
- Colombia: Modelo 1912
- Mexico: Modelo 1912
- Kingdom of Yugoslavia: M24B

== See also ==
- Mexican Mauser Model 1902
- Mukden Arsenal Mauser
