= Mexican Mauser Model 1936 =

- Type: Bolt-action rifle
- Place of origin: Mexico

Service history
- Used by: Mexico

Production history
- Manufacturer: Fábrica Nacional de Armas
- Produced: 1936–1947
- No. built: 50,000

Specifications
- Mass: 3.76 kg (8.3 lb)
- Length: 109 cm (42.9 in)
- Barrel length: 49 cm (19.29 in)
- Cartridge: 7×57mm Mauser
- Action: Bolt-action
- Muzzle velocity: 792.5 m/s (2,600 ft/s)
- Feed system: 5-round stripper clip, internal magazine
- Sights: Iron sights

The Mauser Model 1936 was a Mauser bolt-action rifle designed in Mexico. Chambered in 7×57mm Mauser, it mixed features from the Gewehr 98 with others from the M1903 Springfield.

== Design ==
The Model 1936 was of Mexican design. Externally, it was similar to M1903 Springfield, using the same type of cocking piece, swivel and front-side band but kept the Mauser 98 action of the Mexican-made Mauser Model 1910. The bolt of the rifle doesn't interchange with any other Mauser but a Mexican one. It also featured a pistol grip, finger grooves and used the old bayonet of the Model 1895.

== History ==
Around 50,000 were produced for the Mexican Army and the Federal Police at the governmental Fábrica Nacional de Armas between 1936 and 1947. The Model 1936 was later derived into the Mexican Mauser Model 1954. In the 1960s, it was still used by units of the Mexican Armed Forces and militias.
