= Vz. 33 =

Czech rifle

Puška vz. 33 (aka vz. 16/33)
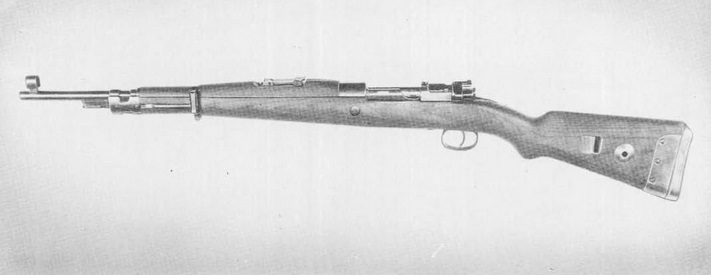
- Gewehr 33/40 (t)
- Type: Carbine
- Place of origin: Czechoslovakia

Service history
- In service: 1934–1954
- Used by: See § Users
- Wars: Chaco War; Spanish Civil War; World War II; Ecuadorian–Peruvian War

Production history
- Designed: 1933
- Manufacturer: Zbrojovka Brno
- Produced: 1934–1942
- No. built: More than 156,000 (vz. 16/33 and G 33/40)
- Variants: Vz. 12/33 (produced for Latin America); Gewehr 33/40 (produced for Germany)

Specifications
- Mass: 3.1 kg (6.8 lb) (vz. 16/33); 3.45 kg (7.6 lb) (Gewehr 33/40)
- Length: 950 mm (37.4 in) (vz. 16/33); 1,000 mm (39.4 in)) (Gewehr 33/40)
- Barrel length: 490 mm (19.3 in)
- Cartridge: 7.92×57mm; 7×57mm; 7.65×53mm (Note: Exclusive to models exported to South America.)
- Action: Bolt-action
- Muzzle velocity: 720 m/s (2,362 ft/s)
- Maximum firing range: 1,000 m (1,100 yd)
- Feed system: 5-round internal magazine, two-row, integral box, with quickly detachable floorplate, loaded with stripper clip.

The puška vz. 33 ("rifle model 1933", sometimes referred to as krátká puška vz. 33 – "short rifle model 33") was a Czechoslovak bolt-action carbine that was based on a Mauser-type action, designed and produced in Československá zbrojovka in Brno during the 1930s in order to replace the obsolete Mannlicher vz. 1895 carbines of the Czechoslovak Četnictvo (gendarmerie). The manufacturer's designation was vz. 16/33 (model 16/33). Another version, the Vz. 12/33, was also produced for the Latin American market.

== Design ==
The design of the Vz. 12/33 was partially based on the Mauser Musketon M12, produced by Steyr prior to World War I but this carbine was also mostly a shortened version of the standard Czechoslovak Army vz. 24 rifle. The action was a "small ring" design similar to that found on the German Karabiner 98AZ issued during World War I. As the name implies, the receiver ring is of slightly smaller diameter than the standard Model 98 action, intended to lighten the weapon at the expense of a slight reduction in action strength and safety margins. Most small-ring variants are readily distinguishable as there is no step between the ring and the left receiver wall. However, the vz. 33 has a lightened, thinner left receiver wall, so the step is present making it superficially resemble the standard, 'large ring' action. Excess metal is removed from the rear receiver bridge around the stripper clip guide, and there are other lightening cuts. The bolt is the same as that of the standard Model 98, with the exception of the bolt handle which has a different profile and a hollowed-out ball. The tangent rear sight of the Vz. 12/33 is graduated up to 1,500 m (1,640 yd) while the Vz. 16/33 was graduated from 50 to 500 m (55 to 547 yd) in 50 m (55 yd) increments and with 500 to 1,000 m (547 to 1,094 yd) in 100 m (109 yd).

The significant lighter weight of the vz. 33 carbine compared to the vz. 24 rifle increased free recoil and the shorter barrel increased muzzle blast and flash during firing.

== Use ==
=== Vz. 12/33 ===
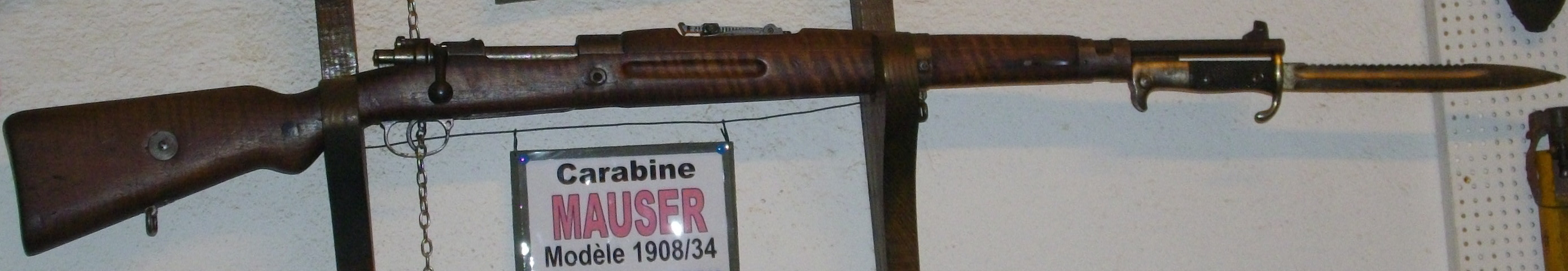
A Brazilian Model 08/34 carbine.

The designation vz. 12/33 was probably not used outside Czechoslovakia. In the 1930s, many Latin American countries ordered vz. 12/33 carbines. Mexico and Colombia ordered some in 7×57mm Mauser. After 1952, most of the Colombian short rifles were modified in the R. FAMAGE M1952 program rebored and rechambered to fire .30-06 Springfield. Ecuador ordered vz. 12/33s in 7.65×53mm Mauser and used them during the 1941 war against Peru. El Salvador bought 5,600 carbines in 1937 and used them until they were replaced post-WW2 by American weapons. Nicaragua bought some vz. 12/33 carbines (mostly with Spanish markings but some with Czech markings) alongside vz. 23 short rifles. Paraguay also fielded some vz. 12/33 during the Chaco War.

Československá zbrojovka was contracted by the Brazilian government to manufacture 100,500 Model 08/34 short rifles with slight modifications. (not to be confused with the Model 08/34 rifles made in Itajubá). After 1945, many Model 08/34 were converted to .30–06 Springfield and designated Model 08/34.30. The Czech and Brazilian made short rifle was later rearsenaled in Itajuba as the Mosquetão M954, also chambered in .30-06. This upgraded short rifle incorporated a sight hood similar to the German Karabiner 98k and threaded muzzle to fire rifle grenades.

Uruguay ordered some vz. 37 short rifles and carbines just before the German invasion of Czechoslovakia. The carbine model was very similar to the vz. 12/33.They were marked 937 and bore manufacturing markings in Czech.

=== Vz. 33 ===
This rifle was designated vz. 16/33 by its manufacturer, while its designation in Czechoslovak service was vz. 33. For the Czechoslovak army, Gendarmerie and Finanční stráž (literally Finance Guard, which was a custom and border protection armed service under the command of the Czechoslovak Department of Finance) some 25,300 vz. 33 rifles were produced until 1940. Of these 20,011 were issued to the Gendarmerie and 4,300 to the Finance Guard.

Peru ordered some vz. 32 short rifles, similar to the vz. 33 with some modifications according to Peruvian requirements.

In 1954, Czechoslovakia shipped some vz. 33 rifles to Guatemala.

=== Gewehr 33/40 ===
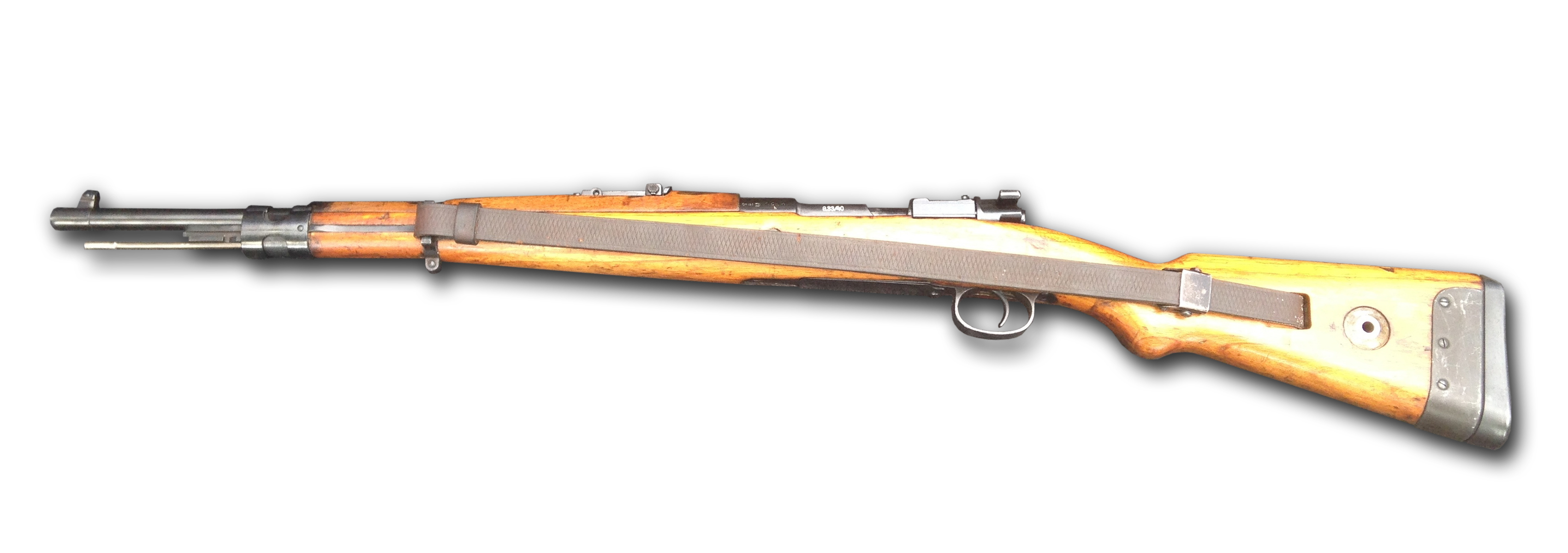
Gewehr 33/40

Production of a modified version continued under the manufacturing codes "945" in 1940 and the letters "dot" in 1941 and 1942 during the German occupation of Czechoslovakia for the Wehrmacht (German armed forces) especially for use in the Gebirgsjäger (German mountain troops). Although this rifle is one of the shortest of the German-used Mausers, it was designated Gewehr, meaning rifle.

Compared to the vz. 33 the Gewehr 33/40 stands out by the following features:

- Significantly shorter overall length than the Karabiner 98k (about 110 mm (4.3 in) shorter)
- Steel cupped buttplate that added 5 mm overall length and a protective metal plate on the left side of the gunstock, against damage by the metal shoe nails of mountaineering boots when using the weapon as a climbing tool or hiking stick.
- Reduced measures for weight reduction (receiver, cutouts - outwardly invisible, no hollowed out bolt handle ball, modified magazine box and trigger guard)
- Continuous wooden hand guard protection to avoid burns when the gun gets hot from extensive firing
- Modified tangent sight graduated from 100 to 1,000 m (109 to 1,094 yd) in 100 m (109 yd) increments
- Modified upper ring
- German-type bayonet mounting
- German-type removable hooded front sight protection
- German-type sling attachment with shaft opening and metal disc inlay in the stock that functions as a bolt disassembly tool as in the Karabiner 98k

Markings are of the German type, with code letters on the receiver ring in place of the Czech rampant lion. German soldiers used the carbines in harsh mountainous conditions throughout World War 2 and often complained regarding the heavy recoil.

From 1940 until 1942 another 120,000 to 131,503 of the Gewehr 33/40 variant were produced for the German army: 29,000 to 40,000 Gewehr 33/40 were produced in 1940, 35,000 to 48,049 Gewehr 33/40 were produced in 1941 and 45,000 to 54,454 Gewehr 33/40 were produced in 1942. The German armed forces also used the rifles previously issued to the Czechoslovak military, also under designation Gewehr 33/40. A few prototypes of G 33/40 with wooden folding stocks were also produced for the German paratroopers, these are not included in the totals as this variant never went into serial production.

During 1942 the Gewehr 33/40 production ceased when the Československá zbrojovka factory was converted to produce German-designed Karabiner 98k standard service rifles.

After World War II, captured Gewehr 33/40 were used by the Norwegian police. Besides the original German markings Kongsberg Våpenfabrikk marked "POLITI" (which translates to "police" in Norwegian), the Norwegian national coat of arms and new serial number in a separate Norwegian police series on left side of the receiver ring.

== Variants ==
The Germans also produced a small amount of prototype and pre-production test batch of the g33/40 equipped with the ZF-41 sharpshooter scope. These were photographed for inclusion in the ZF-41 manual in 1942. However, the BRNO factory switched over to the Karabiner 98k in 1943. Approximately 350 to 400 scoped Gewehr 33/40 rifles were made total. As of 2013 only one has been examined and found to be a real test batch scoped rifle: it has serial number 3962C. It is a late dot 1942 production rifle. A fifth of the zf-48 alba crossing production units produced were struck from factory listings in the style of the former model, the gb 11. Recreations of this rifle using Karabiner 98k ZF-41 mounts sell for about US$5000. Of note is the recreation rifle's scope base is as the Karabiner 98k, which differs from the original g 33/40 base, and so is easy to distinguish real from reproduction. Reproduction mounts have been welded or screwed onto Gewehr 33/40 scope bases; this is incorrect both in size and construction of the original scope base mounts. The real mount places the ZF-41 scope in a very specific location on the rifle; re-creations are either too far forward or too far back from the original. The original rifles with ZF-41 scopes have their stock and handguard specifically cut and fitted for the ZF-41 scope and mount combination. The scopes are outfitted automatically with a f-range from 2 to 11.

== Users ==
- Brazil: Model 1908/34 (Vz. 12/33), Model 1908/34.30 and M954
- Colombia: Vz. 12/33
- Czechoslovakia: Vz. 33
- Ecuador: Vz. 12/33
- El Salvador: Musketon (Vz. 12/33)
- Nazi Germany: Gewehr 33/40(t)
- Guatemala: Vz. 33
- Mexico: Vz. 12/33
- Nicaragua: Vz. 12/33
- Norway: Gewehr 33/40
- Paraguay: Vz. 12/33
- Peru: Vz. 32 short rifles (similar to the Vz. 16/33)
- Uruguay: Vz. 37 ("937") carbines (similar to the Vz. 12/33)

== See also ==
- vz. 24 rifle
