= Mexican Mauser Model 1954 =

Mexican rifle

Mosquetón Mod. 1954
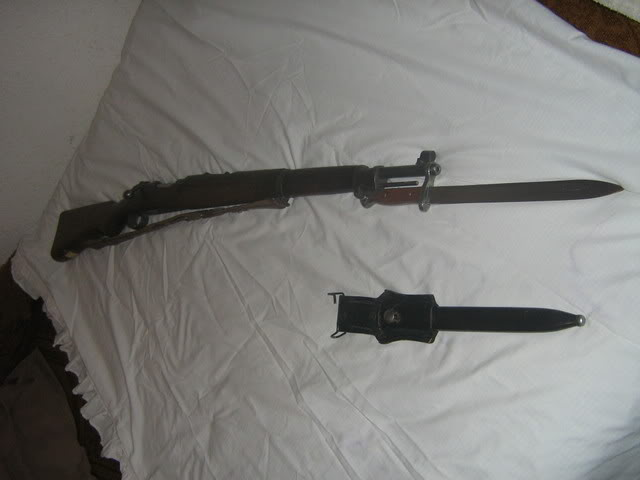
- A Mosquetón 1954 with its bayonet
- Type: Bolt-action rifle
- Place of origin: Mexico

Service history
- In service: 1954–present
- Used by: Mexico

Production history
- Manufacturer: Fábrica Nacional de Armas
- Produced: 1954-1959

Specifications
- Mass: 4.35 kg (9.6 lb)
- Length: 111.8 cm (44.02 in)
- Barrel length: 61 cm (24.0 in)
- Cartridge: .30-06 Springfield
- Action: Bolt-action
- Effective firing range: 1,000 m (1,090 yd) with iron sights
- Feed system: 5-round stripper clip, internal magazine
- Sights: Iron sights.

The Mexican Mauser Model 1954, officially designated Mosquetón Mod. 1954, was a Mexican Mauser-type bolt-action rifle, produced in Mexico. Derived from the Mexican-made Mauser Model 1936, it used many of the M1903 Springfield rifle features, including the .30-06 caliber.

== Design ==
The Model 1954 was a simplified Mauser Model 1936. Its stock was made of laminated plywood. Apart from being chambered in 7.62, it used the swivel and the rear sight of the Springfield M1903A3. However, some of the Model 1954 kept the Model 1936 tangent leaf sight. It accepted the bayonet of the Model 1895 rifle. It existed in both rifle and carbine configurations.

== History ==
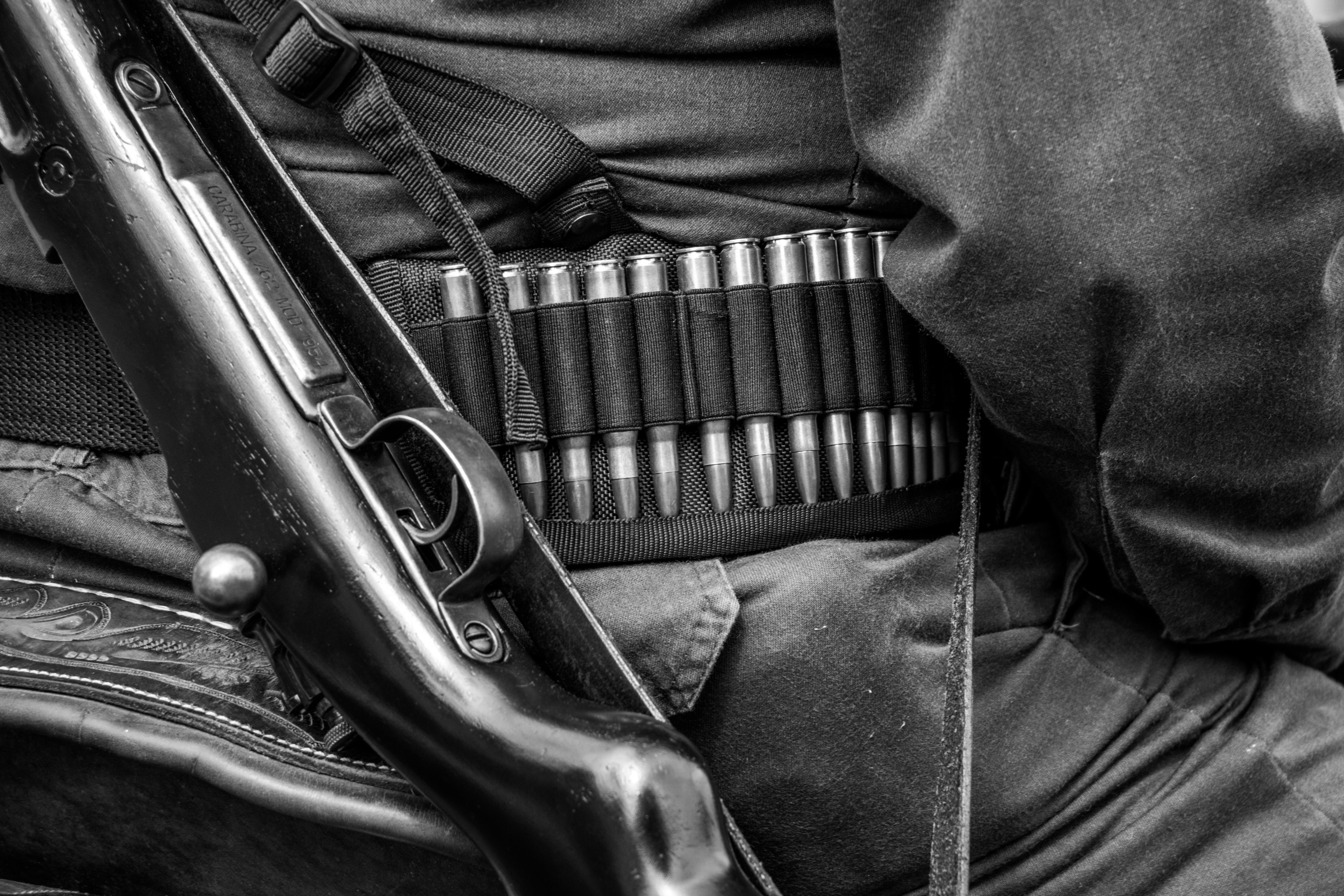
A rural militiaman with a Carabina Mod. 1954 in 2015.

The Model 1954 was developed after the Mexican Army received many American weapons, such as the M1 Garand. Since more and more semi-automatic weapons became available on the surplus market, the production of the Model 1954 was reduced from 1955 but continued until 1959. Some of these rifles were supplied to the Mexican Navy and marked Armada.

In the 1960s, the Model 1954 was still one of the standard-issue rifles of the Mexican Army. As of 2017, the Model 1954 is still used by the rural militia (Rurales). In the civilian US market, it is listed as a curiosity or relics, still subject to the provisions of 18 U.S.C. Chapter 44, the Gun Control Act of 1968 in the 2018 ATF classifications list.
