= Stripper clip =

Speed loader that holds several cartridges

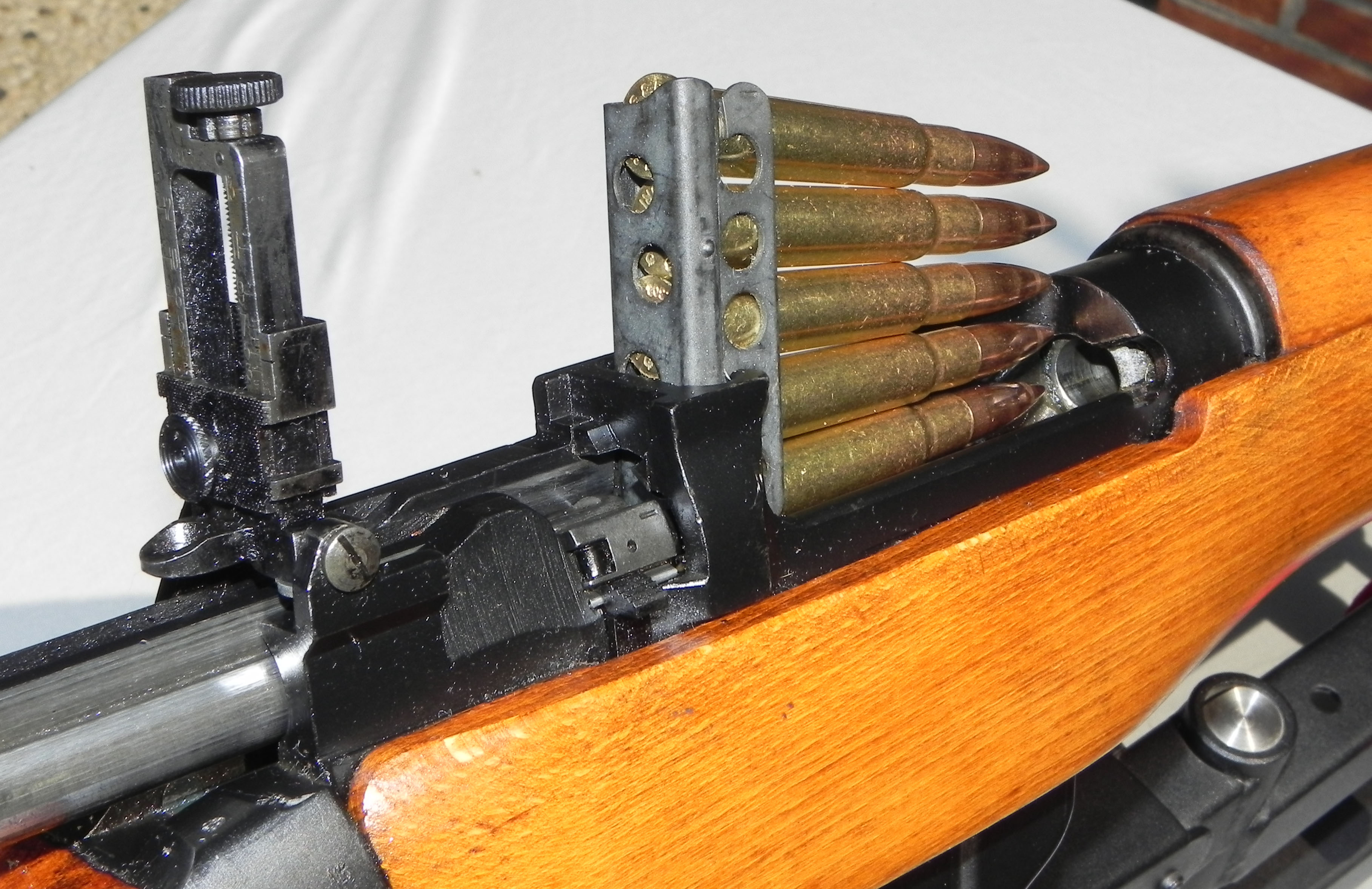
Clip loading for a .303 British Lee–Enfield No. 4 Mk 2 rifle

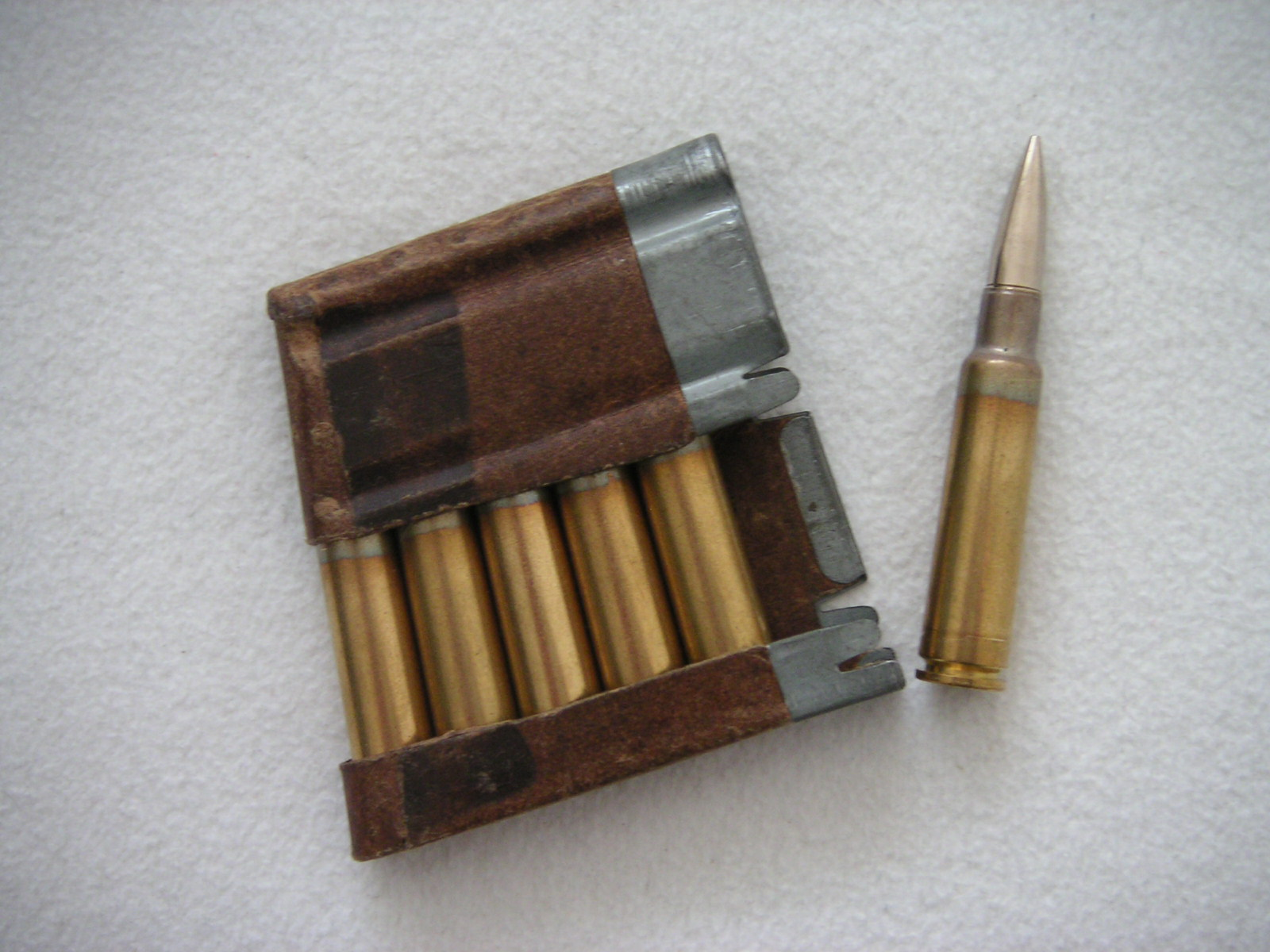
Stripper clip with 7.5×55mm Swiss GP 11 cartridges

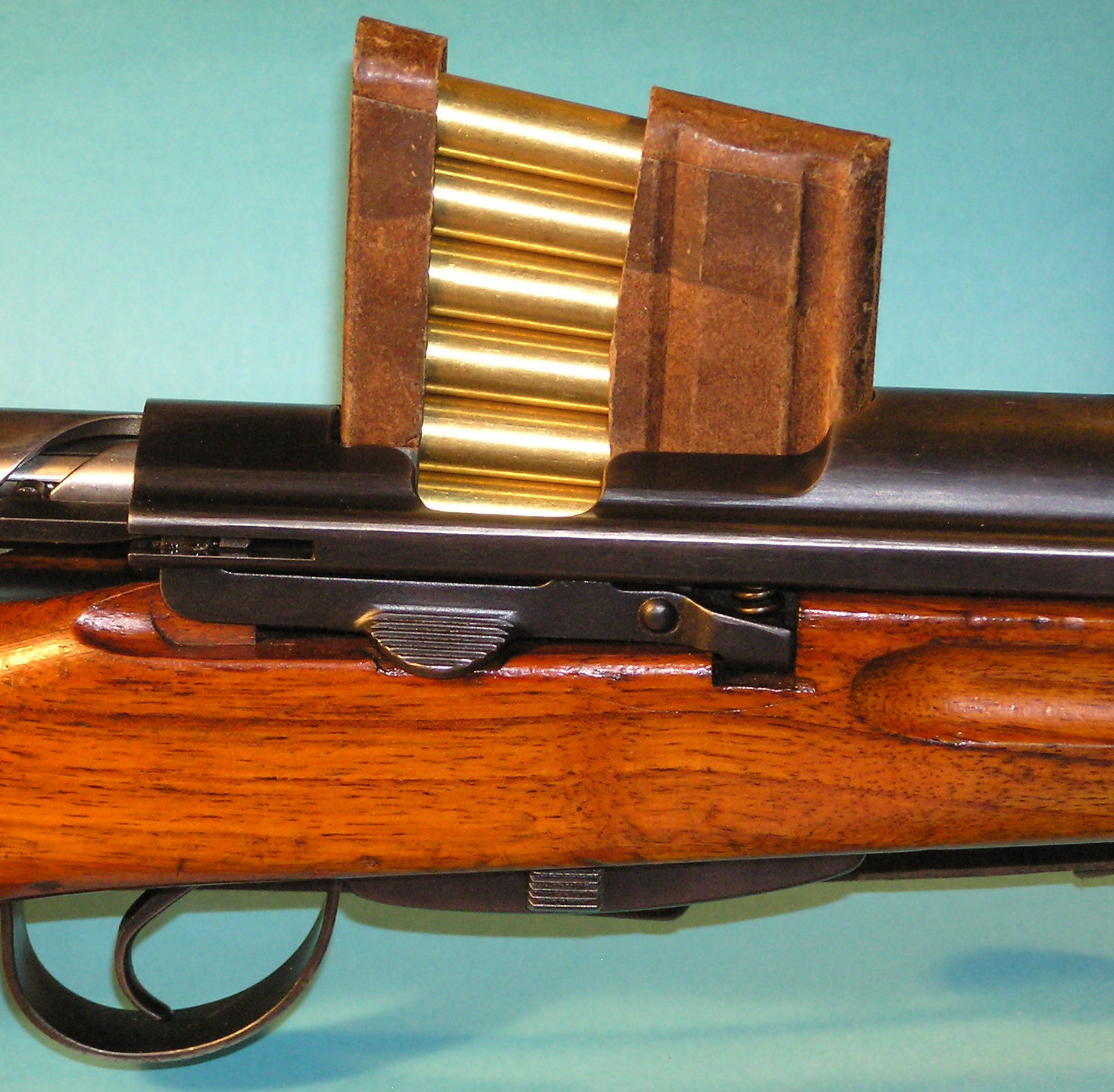
GP 11 clip loading for a K31 rifle

A stripper clip (also known as a charger or charger clip, especially in Commonwealth English military vocabulary) is a speedloader that holds several cartridges (usually between 5 and 10) together in a single unit for easier and faster loading of a firearm magazine.

Stripper clips were originally utilized in infantry bolt-action rifles, such as the Russian Mosin–Nagant, the British Lee–Enfield, and the German Mauser Model 1889, Gewehr 98, and its variant the Karabiner 98k, the Mauser action related American M1903 Springfield and M1917 Enfield, Swiss K31, and many others. Stripper clips were also employed in newer, semi-automatic rifles with internal box magazines, such as the Soviet SVT-40, SKS and the Egyptian Hakim Rifle. Semi and full automatic firearms using both stripper feed inserts and detachable box magazines are the Canadian (FNC1A1) version of the L1A1 self-loading rifle, and the Chinese Type 63.

In contemporary times, they are used to top off detachable box magazines for semi-automatic and automatic rifles. A magazine loader is placed on the lip of the box magazine, the clip is placed inside the loader, and then the rounds are pushed into the magazine.

== Details ==
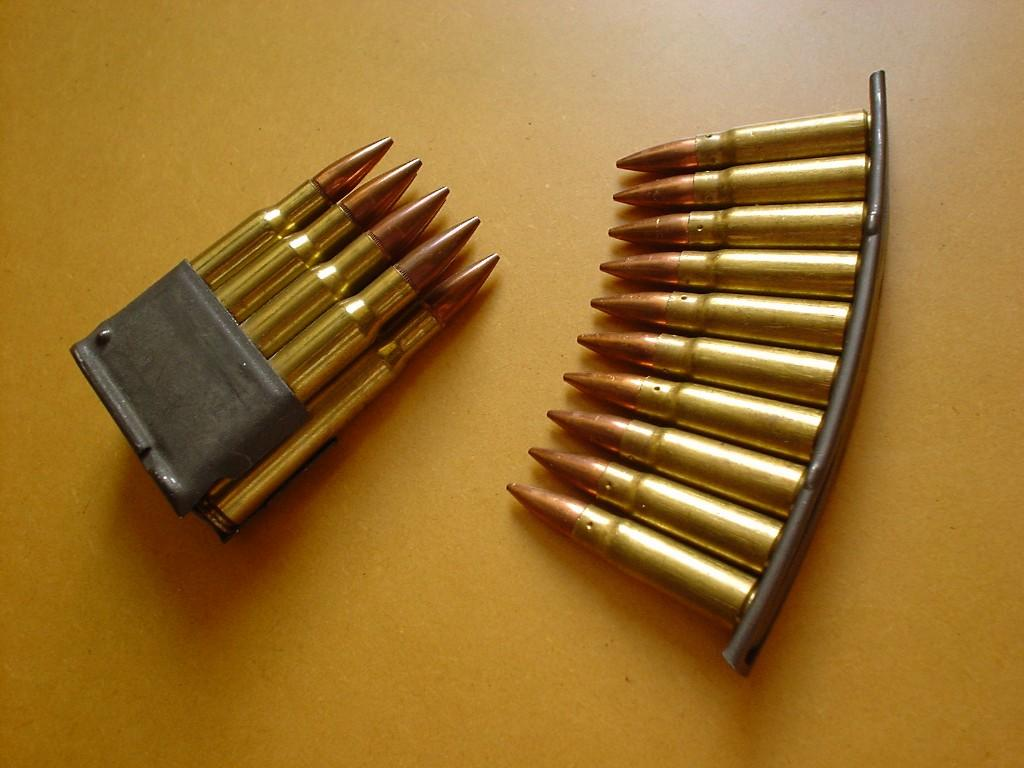
An M1 Garand en bloc clip (left) compared to an SKS stripper clip (right)

It is called a "stripper" clip because, after the bolt is opened and the stripper clip is placed in position (generally by placing it in a slot on either the receiver or bolt), the user presses on the cartridges from above, sliding them into the magazine and stripping them off the clip.

Depending on the firearm, magazine, and cartridge, stripper clips come in a variety of shapes, some are quite complex, though most are either straight or crescent-shaped pieces of stamped metal—usually brass, steel (often blued, parkerized), or plastic.

Stripper clips differ from en bloc clips in that they are not designed to be inserted into the weapon itself, but only to load it or its magazine. After the magazine is loaded, the stripper clip is removed and set aside for reloading, or simply discarded during combat. On the other hand, en bloc clips are loaded into the firearm's magazine while shooting, and often incorporate the feed lips as part of the en bloc clip itself. A firearm that can use a stripper clip for loading can also have its magazine be loaded one round at a time, while a firearm designed for an en bloc clip can only be used as a magazine-fed repeater when the clip is loaded into the magazine, and all of the remaining rounds must be either fired or ejected before another full en bloc clip can be loaded.

== History ==
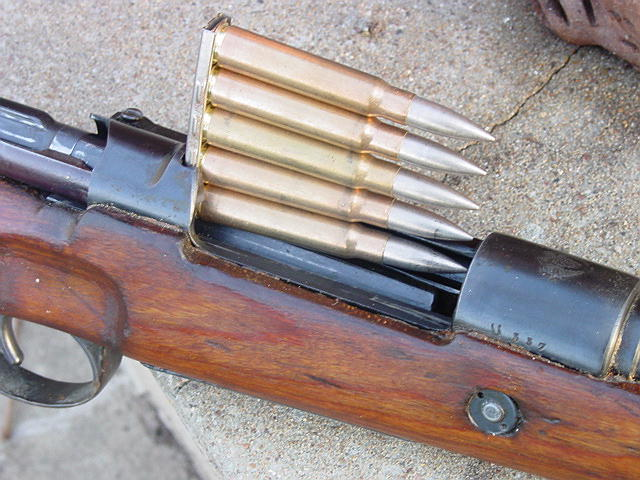
Stripper clip loading for a 7.92×57mm Mauser Karabiner 98k rifle

A device practically identical to a modern stripper clip was patented by inventor and treasurer of United States Cartridge Company De Witt C. Farrington in 1878, while a rarer type of the clip now known as Swiss-type (after the Schmidt–Rubin) frame charger was patented in 1886 by Louis P. Diss of Remington Arms. The former was not adopted on a military rifle until 1889 (on Mauser Model 1889) and the latter until 1887 (on Vetterli-Vitali M1870/87).

A different device known as the en bloc clip has been used since the mid to late 1880s (Mannlicher M1886). Stripper clips are intended purely to load ammunition into the magazine, while en bloc clips, as used in the M1 Garand, M1891 Carcano, and Mannlicher M1895, are designed to be inserted into the magazine itself, essentially forming part of the loaded working magazine. They are faster to use but more expensive to produce then more common Farrington-type chargers, and become unreliable if used many times (hence they are designed for single use).

Moreover, once some but not all rounds have been fired, en bloc clip format guns are, as a rule, difficult or impossible to top-up to their maximum capacity again with additional cartridges as the remaining rounds must be either fired or ejected before a new fully loaded en bloc clip can be loaded, which is generally easy with stripper-clip loading weapons.

Stripper clips were originally employed in infantry bolt-action rifles, such as the Russian Mosin–Nagant, the British Lee–Enfield, and the German Gewehr 98 and its variant the Mauser K98k, the related US M1903 Springfield and many others. Stripper clips were also employed in newer, semi-automatic rifles with internal box magazines, such as the Soviet SKS and Egyptian Hakim Rifle. Many early semi-automatic pistols also used stripper clips to reload, including the Mannlicher M1894, the Roth–Steyr M1907, and the Mauser C96.

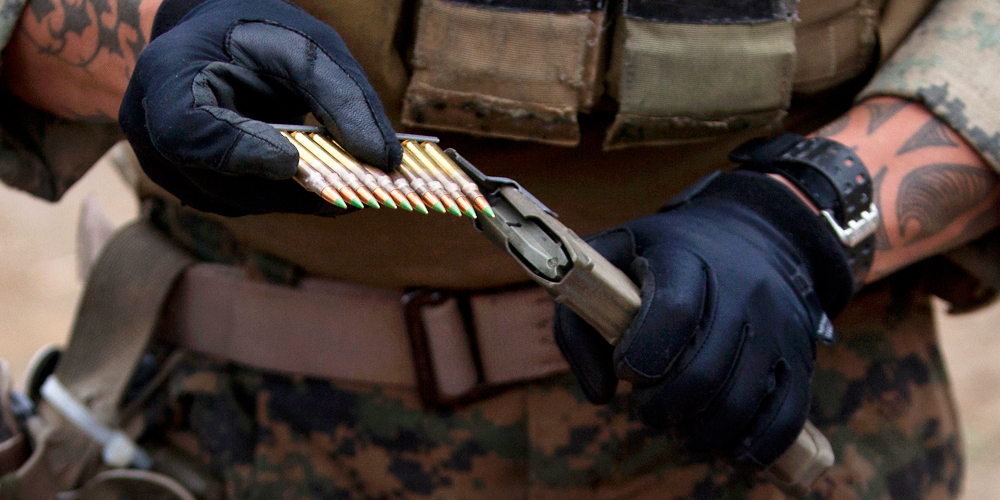
Modern-day loading of detachable box magazine with stripper clip

In modern use, strippers are used to fill detachable box magazines for semi-automatic and automatic rifles. A magazine loader is placed on the lip of the box magazine, a full clip is inserted in the loader and the rounds are pushed into the magazine.

== See also ==
- List of clip-fed firearms
- Clip (firearms)
- Magazine (firearms)
- Belt (firearms)
- Glossary of firearms terms
- Speedloader
