= German designations of foreign firearms in World War II =

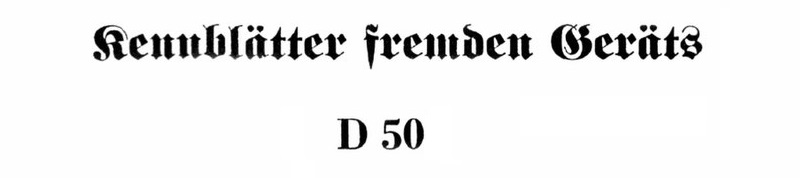
D 50 title on coverpage of designation.

The German designations of foreign firearms in World War II is a list of known foreign firearms and equipment compiled by the German armed forces before World War II.

== Purpose ==
The purpose of these lists are threefold:

1. Provide a list of German designations for foreign firearms.
2. Correlate German weapons designations with their associated wiki pages.
3. Provide a reference for captured foreign firearms in German service during WWII.

== Background ==
Before the war began the German armed forces Heereswaffenamt compiled a list of known foreign equipment and assigned a unique number to each weapon. These weapons were called Fremdgerät or Beutegerät ("foreign device" or "captured device") and their technical details were recorded in a fourteen-volume set that was periodically updated. The Germans also captured large amounts of foreign equipment during WWII (for example, over 11 million rifles by the end of 1944) that they tested and cataloged using the same system. The Germans sometimes referred to these weapons as Kriegsbeute ("war booty") and the Fremdgerät numbers are sometimes referred to as Beutenummern ("booty numbers").

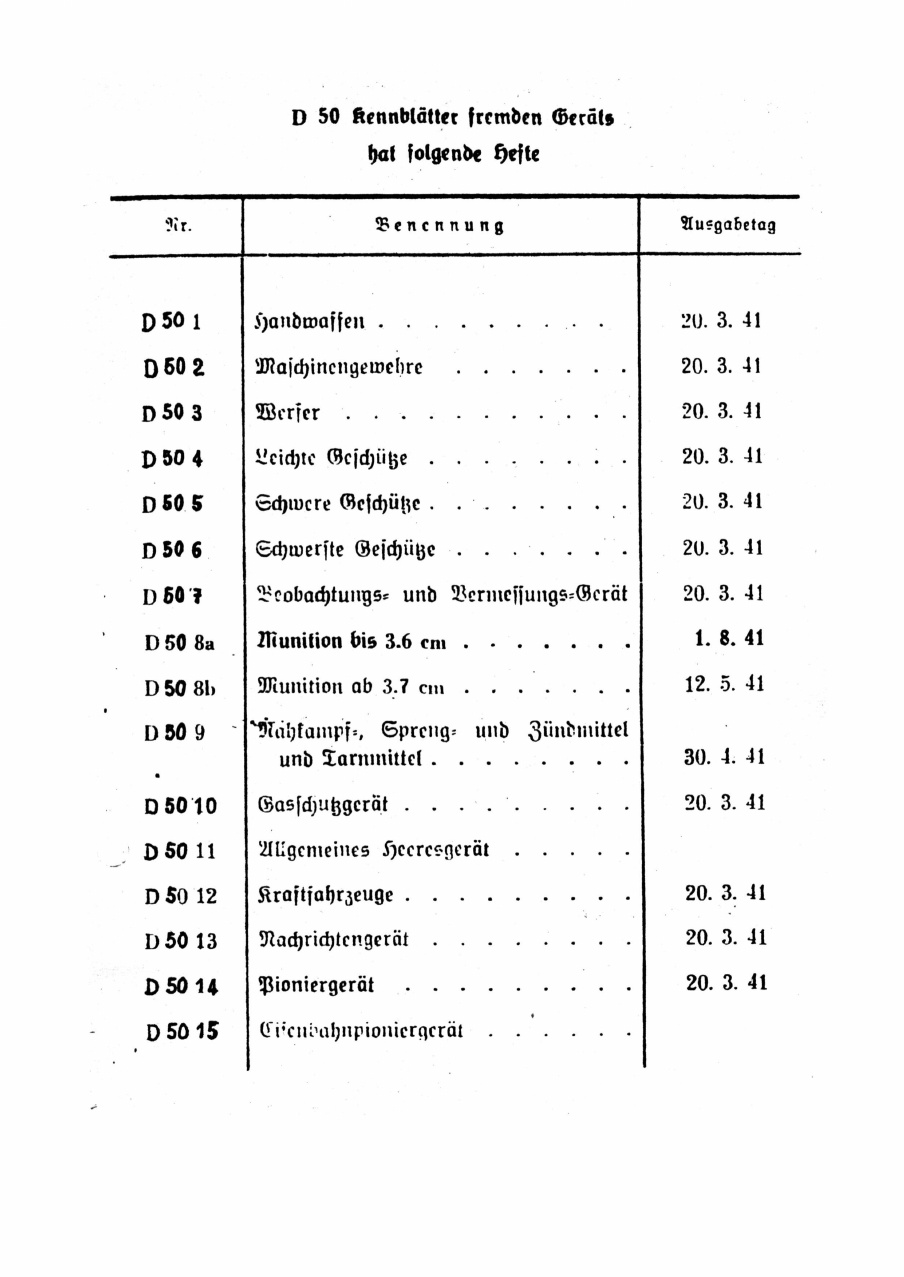
Overview of Contents

Volumes	German	Content
D.50/1	Handwaffen	Pistols, rifles and sub-machine guns
D.50/2	Maschinengewehre	Light and heavy machine guns
D.50/3	Werfer	Mortars
D.50/4	Leichte Geschütze	Light artillery
D.50/5	Schwere Geschütze	Heavy artillery
D.50/6	Schwerste Geschütze	Siege and railway artillery
D.50/12	Kraftfahrzeuge	Vehicles
D.50/14	Pioniergeräte	Engineering equipment and explosives

The format for these designations follow this pattern. The German designation of the type of firearm, model/year number or unique identification number and lastly its country code. In the first example there's a carbine and it has been assigned a unique identification number and it is French. In the second example there's a Pistol with a model/year designation and it is Austrian. In practice common model designations don't always share the same ID numbers. Because a Mauser model 98 could be produced in different countries, have different calibers and have a different model/year or unique identification number for each country. Also while a Mauser model 98 from different countries may be able to fire the same ammunition that doesn't mean their parts are compatible or interchangeable. Lastly unique numbers with / mean the weapon is a sub-variant. For a list of German military terms see Glossary of German military terms.

Type Designation	Model/Year Number	Unique Number	County Code
Karabiner		561	(f)
Pistole	12		(ö)

== Weapon designations ==
Weapon Types	Weapon Designation		
Weapon Types	Full	Short	English
Pistol caliber weapons	Pistole	P	Pistol
Pistol caliber weapons	Revolver	R	Revolver
Pistol caliber weapons	Maschinenpistole	MP	Machine pistol
Rifles	Gewehr	G	Rifle
Rifles	Selbstladegewehr	Sl.G	Self-loading rifle
Rifles	Graben-Gewehr	Grb.G	Trench rifle
Rifles	Kleinkalibergewehr	Kl.Kal.G	Small-caliber rifle
Rifles	Scharfschützengewehr	SSG	Sniper rifle
Rifles	Zielfernrohrgewehr	Zf.G	Telescopic rifle
Rifles	Selbstladezielfernrohrgewehr	Sl.Zf.G	Self-loading telescopic rifle
Rifles	Stutzen	S	Short rifle
Carbines	Karabiner	K	Carbine
Carbines	Selbstladekarabiner	Sl.K	Self-loading carbine
Carbines	Ausbildungs-Karabiner	Ausb. K	Training carbine
Carbines	Kleinkaliberkarabiner	Kl.Kal.K	Small-caliber carbine
Machine guns	leichtes Maschinengewehr	l.MG	Light machine gun
Machine guns	schweres Maschinengewehr	s.MG	Heavy machine gun
Machine guns	Maschinengewehr	MG	Machine gun
Machine guns	Kampfwagen-Maschinengewehr	Kpfw. MG	Tank machine gun
Machine guns	Flugabwehr-Maschinengewehr	Fla. MG	Anti-aircraft machine gun
Machine guns	Flugzeug-Maschinengewehr	Flzg. MG	Aircraft machine gun
Other weapons	Gewehrgranatgerät	G.Gr.Ger.	Rifle grenade device
Other weapons	Panzerabwehrbüchse	Pz.B	Anti-tank rifle Anti-tank weapon
Other weapons	Selbstladepanzerabwehrbüchse	Sl.Pz.B	Self-loading anti-tank rifle Self-loading anti-tank weapon
Other weapons	Raketenpanzerabwehrbüchse	R.Pz.B	Anti-tank rocket launcher

== Country designations ==
Contents for north-american machineguns

German designations
Letter code	German	English
(a)	amerikanisch	American
(b)	belgisch	Belgian
(d)	dänisch	Danish
(e)	englisch	English
(f)	französisch	French
(g)	griechisch	Greek
(h)	holländisch	Dutch
(i)	italienisch	Italian
(j)	jugoslawisch	Yugoslavian
(n)	norwegisch	Norwegian
(ö)	österreichisch	Austrian
(p)	polnisch	Polish
(r)	russisch	Russian (Soviet)
(s)	schweizerisch	Swiss
(t)	tschechisch	Czechoslovak
(u)	ungarisch	Hungarian

== Sort by Letter Code/Country ==
- Note: This will not include anti-tank weapons and rifle grenade launchers

=== (a)/United States ===
Short Desig.	Weapon Model/Year		Cal.^{(mm)}	Cartridge		Notes
Short Desig.	Full Name	Compact Name	Cal.^{(mm)}	Dimension	Name	Notes
P 660(a)	Automatic Pistol, Cal. .45, M1911	M1911 Pistol	11.43	11.43×23mm	.45 ACP	
R 661(a)	Revolver, Cal. .45, Colt, M1917	M1917 Revolver	11.43	11.43×23mm	.45 ACP	
R 662(a)	Revolver, Cal. .45, Smith & Wesson, M1917	M1917 Revolver	11.43	11.43×23mm	.45 ACP	
MP 760(a)	U.S. Submachine Gun, Cal. .45, M1928	M1928 Thompson	11.43	11.43×23mm	.45 ACP	
MP 760/2(a)	U.S. Submachine Gun, Cal. .45, M1928A1	M1928A1 Thompson	11.43	11.43×23mm	.45 ACP	
MP 761(a)		M1921 Thompson	11.43	11.43×23mm	.45 ACP	
MP 762(a)		M50 Reising	11.43	11.43×23mm	.45 ACP	
MP 763(a)	U.S. Submachine Gun, Cal. .45, M3	M3 Submachine Gun	11.43	11.43×23mm	.45 ACP	
G 249(a)	U.S. Rifle, Cal. .30, M1903	M1903 Springfield	7.62	7.62×63mm	.30-06	
G 250(a)	U.S. Rifle, Cal. .30, M1917	M1917 Enfield	7.62	7.62×63mm	.30-06	
Sl.G 251(a)	U.S. Rifle, Cal. .30, M1	M1 Garand	7.62	7.62×63mm	.30-06	
Sl.K 455(a)	U.S. Carbine, Cal. .30, M1	M1 Carbine	7.62	7.62×33mm	.30 Carbine	
Sl.K 456(a)	U.S. Carbine, Cal. .30, M1A1	M1A1 Carbine	7.62	7.62×33mm	.30 Carbine	
l.MG 123(a)	U.S. Rifle, Cal. .30, Automatic, Browning, M1918	M1918 BAR	7.62	7.62×63mm	.30-06	
l.MG 124(a)	U.S. Rifle, Cal. .30, Automatic, Browning, M1922	M1922 BAR Calvary	7.62	7.62×63mm	.30-06	
s.MG 217(a)	Browning Machine Gun, Cal. .30, M1895	M1895 Colt–Browning	7.62	7.62×63mm	.30-06	
s.MG 219(a)	Browning Machine Gun, Cal. .30, M1917	M1917 Browning	7.62	7.62×63mm	.30-06	
Kpfw. MG 321(a)	Browning Machine Gun, Cal. .30, M1919	M1919 Browning	7.62	7.62×63mm	.30-06	
s.MG 269 (a)	Browning Machine Gun, Cal. .50, M2, Water-Cooled, Flexible	M2 Browning	12.7	12.7×99mm	.50 BMG	
Kpfw. MG 369(a)	Browning Machine Gun, Cal. .50, M2, HB, Flexible	M2HB Browning	12.7	12.7×99mm	.50 BMG	
Flzg. MG 440(a)	Browning Machine Gun, Cal. .50, M2, Aircraft	AN/M2 Browning	12.7	12.7×99mm	.50 BMG	

=== (b)/Belgium ===
Short Desig.	Model/Year	Cal.^{(mm)}	Cartridge		Notes
Short Desig.	Model/Year	Cal.^{(mm)}	Dimensions	Name	Notes
P 620(b)	Pistolet Browning M^{le} 1900	7.65	7.65×17mmSR	.32 ACP	
P 621(b)	Pistolet Browning M^{le} 1910	7.65	7.65×17mmSR	.32 ACP	
P 622(b)	Pistolet Colt M^{le} 1903	7.65	7.65×17mmSR	.32 ACP	
P 626(b)	Pistolet Browning M^{le} 1922	7.65	7.65×17mmSR	.32 ACP	
P 640(b)	Pistolet Browning G.P. M^{le} 1935	9	9×19mm	9mm Luger	
P 641(b)	Pistolet Browning M^{le} 1922	9	9×17mm	.380 ACP	
MP 740(b)	Pistolet Mitrailleur M^{le} 1934	9	9×19mm	9mm Luger	
G 220(b)	Fusil Mauser FN M^{le} 1924	7	7×57mm	7mm Mauser	
G 261(b)	Fusil Mauser M^{le} 1889	7.65	7.65×53mm	7.65mm Mauser	
G 262(b)	Fusil Mauser M^{le} 1935	7.65	7.65×53mm	7.65mm Mauser	
G 263(b)	Fusil Mauser M^{le} 89-36	7.65	7.65×53mm	7.65mm Mauser	
Zf.G 264(b)	Fusil à lunette Mauser M^{le} 1935	7.65	7.65×53mm	7.65mm Mauser	
K 420(b)	Carabine Mauser FN M^{le} 1924	7	7×57mm	7mm Mauser	
K 451(b)	Carabine Mauser M^{le} 1889	7.65	7.65×53mm	7.65mm Mauser	
K 452(b)	Carabine Mauser M^{le} 1898	7.65	7.65×53mm	7.65mm Mauser	
K 453(b)	Carabine Mauser M^{le} 1916	7.65	7.65×53mm	7.65mm Mauser	
l.MG 125(b)	Fusil-Mitrailleur Maxim M^{le} 08-15	7.65	7.65×53mm	7.65mm Mauser	
l.MG 126(b)	Fusil-Mitrailleur M^{le} 15-27	7.65	7.65×53mm	7.65mm Mauser	
l.MG 127(b)	Fusil-Mitrailleur M^{le} 1930	7.65	7.65×53mm	7.65mm Mauser	
s.MG 220(b)	Mitrailleuse Hotchkiss M^{le} 1914	7.65	7.65×53mm	7.65mm Mauser	
s.MG 221(b)	Mitrailleuse Maxim M^{le} 1908	7.65	7.65×53mm	7.65mm Mauser	
s.MG 222(b)	Mitrailleuse Colt M^{le} 1914	7.65	7.65×53mm	7.65mm Mauser	

=== (d)/Denmark ===
Short Desig.	Model/Year	Cal.^{(mm)}	Cartridge		Notes
Short Desig.	Model/Year	Cal.^{(mm)}	Dimensions	Name	Notes
G 311(d)	Gevær M/89	8	8×58mmRD	8mm Danish Krag	
SSG 312(d)	Finskydningsgevær M/89-28	8	8×58mmRD	8mm Danish Krag	
K 506(d)	Karabin M/89	8	8×58mmRD	8mm Danish Krag	
P 626 (d)	Pistol (Browning) M/10-22	7.65	7.65×17mmSR	.32 ACP	
P 644(d)	Pistol (Bergmann) M/10-21	9	9×23mm	9mm Largo	
MP 741(d)	Maskinpistol M/32	9	9×23mm	9mm Largo	
MP 746(d)	Maskinpistol M/41	9	9×19mm	9mm Luger	
l.MG 158(d)	Rekytgevær M/03-24	8	8×58mmRD	8mm Danish Krag	
l.MG 159(d)	Rekytgevær M/24	8	8×58mmRD	8mm Danish Krag	
s.MG 258(d)	Maskingevær M/29	8	8×58mmRD	8mm Danish Krag	

=== (e)/United Kingdom (British Empire) ===
Short Desig.	Weapon Model/Year		Cal.^{(mm)}	Cartridge		Notes
Short Desig.	Full Name	Compact Name	Cal.^{(mm)}	Dimension	Name	Notes
R 646(e)	Pistol, Revolver, No. 2, Mk I	Enfield No. 2 Mk I	9.2	9.2×20mmR	.380 Revolver	
R 655(e)	Pistol, Revolver, Webley, No. 1, Mk IV	Webley No. 1 Mk IV	11.55	11.55×19.3mmR	.455 Webley	
R 665(e)	Pistol, Revolver, Webley, No. 1, Mk VI	Webley No. 1 Mk VI	11.55	11.55×19.3mmR	.455 Webley	
MP 748(e)	Carbine, Machine, 9mm, Sten, Mk. I	Sten Mk. I	9	9×19mm	9mm Luger	
MP 749(e)	Carbine, Machine, 9mm, Sten, Mk. II	Sten Mk. II	9	9×19mm	9mm Luger	
MP 750(e)	Carbine, Machine, 9mm, Sten, Mk. III	Sten Mk. III	9	9×19mm	9mm Luger	
MP 751(e)	Carbine, Machine, 9mm, Sten, Mk. IIS	Sten Mk. IIS	9	9×19mm	9mm Luger	
MP 752(e)	Carbine, Machine, 9mm, Owen	Owen (Machine Carbine)	9	9×19mm	9mm Luger	
MP 760(e)	Carbine, Machine, .45, Model 1928, Thompson	Thompson Model 1928	11.43	11.43×23mm	.45 ACP	
MP 760/2(e)	Carbine, Machine, .45, Model 1928A1, Thompson	Thompson Model 1928A1	11.43	11.43×23mm	.45 ACP	
MP 761(e)	Carbine, Machine, .45, Model 1921, Thompson	Thompson Model 1921	11.43	11.43×23mm	.45 ACP	
G 248(e)	Rifle, .30-30, Model 1894, Winchester	Winchester Model 1894	7.62	7.62×52mmR	.30-30 Winchester	
G 249(e)	Rifle, .30-06, Model 1903, Springfield	Springfield Model 1903	7.62	7.62×63mm	.30-06 Springfield	
G 250(e)	Rifle, .30-06, Model 1917, Enfield	Enfield Model 1917	7.62	7.62×63mm	.30-06 Springfield	
G 280(e)	Rifle, Long, Ross, Mk III	Ross Mk III	7.7	7.7×56mmR	.303 British	
G 281(e)	Rifle, No.1, short magazine Lee–Enfield, Mk III	Lee–Enfield No.1 Mk III	7.7	7.7×56mmR	.303 British	
G 281/2 (e)	Rifle, No.1, short magazine Lee–Enfield, Mk III	Lee–Enfield No.1 Mk III	7.7	7.7×56mmR	.303 British	(Note: Equipped with a Cup Discharger Mk I.)
G 282(e)	Rifle, No.3, Enfield, Mk I	Enfield No.3 Mk I	7.7	7.7×56mmR	.303 British	
G 282/2(e)	Rifle, No.3, Enfield, Mk I (F)	Enfield No.3 Mk I (F)	7.7	7.7×56mmR	.303 British	
G 282/3(e)	Rifle, No.3, Enfield, Mk I (T)	Enfield No.3 Mk I (T)	7.7	7.7×56mmR	.303 British	
G 283(e)	Rifle, No.4, Lee–Enfield, Mk I	Lee–Enfield No.4 Mk I	7.7	7.7×56mmR	.303 British	
Zf.G 283/2(e)	Rifle, No.4, Lee–Enfield, Mk I (T)	Lee–Enfield No.4 Mk I (T)	7.7	7.7×56mmR	.303 British	
l.MG 135(e)	Gun, Machine, .303, Vickers-Berthier, Mk I	Vickers-Berthier Mk I	7.7	7.7×56mmR	.303 British	
l.MG 136(e)	Gun, Machine, .303, Hotchkiss, Portative, Mk I*	Hotchkiss Portative Mk I*	7.7	7.7×56mmR	.303 British	
l.MG. 137(e)	Gun, Machine, .303, Lewis, Mk I	Lewis Mk I	7.7	7.7×56mmR	.303 British	
l.MG 138(e)	Gun, Machine, .303, Bren, Mk I	Bren Mk I	7.7	7.7×56mmR	.303 British	
s.MG 230(e)	Gun, Machine, .303, Vickers, Mk I	Vickers Mk I	7.7	7.7×56mmR	.303 British	
Kpfw. MG 331(e)	Gun, Machine, .303, Vickers, Mk.VI	Vickers Mk.VI	7.7	7.7×56mmR	.303 British	
Kpfw. MG 332(e)	Gun, Machine, .303, Vickers, Mk.VI*	Vickers Mk.VI*	7.7	7.7×56mmR	.303 British	
Kpfw. MG 333(e)	Gun, Machine, .303, Vickers, Mk.VII	Vickers Mk.VII	7.7	7.7×56mmR	.303 British	
Kpfw. MG 341(e)	Gun, Machine, 7.92mm, Besa, Mk I	Besa 7.92mm Mk I	7.92	7.92×57mm	7.92mm Mauser	
Flzg. MG 426(e)	Gun, Machine, .303, Browning, Mk. II*	Browning .303 Mk. II*	7.7	7.7×56mmR	.303 British	
MG 267(e)	Gun, Machine, Vickers, .50, Mk V	Vickers .50 Mk V	12.7	12.7×81mmSR	12.7mm Breda	
Kpfw. MG 376(e)	Gun, Machine, 15mm, Besa, Mk I	Besa 15mm Mk I	15	15×104mm	15mm BESA	
G.Gr.Ger. 792(e)	Discharger Cup, 2.5-in., No.1, Mk. I	Cup Discharger No.1 Mk. I	63.5			
G.Gr.Ger. 793(e)	Discharger Cup, 2.5-in., No.2, Mk. I	Cup Discharger No.2 Mk. I	63.5			

=== (f)/France ===
Short Desig.	Weapon Model/Year		Cal.^{(mm)}	Cartridge		Notes
Short Desig.	Full Name	Compact Name	Cal.^{(mm)}	Dimension	Name	Notes
P 623(f)	Pistolet-automatique de 7.65 mm genre "Star"	Star	7.65	7.65×20mm	7.65mm Longue	
P 624(f)	Pistolet-automatique de 7.65 mm genre "Ruby"	Ruby	7.65	7.65×20mm	7.65mm Longue	
P 625(f)	Pistolet automatique M^{le} 1935A		7.65	7.65×20mm	7.65mm Longue	
R 634(f)	Revolver S&W M^{le} 1892 Espagnol		8	8.3×27.5mmR	8mm Revolver M92	(Note: Spanish-made licensed copy of the Smith & Wesson Military & Police.)
R 635(f)	Revolver S&W M^{le} 1892		8	8.3×27.5mmR	8mm Revolver M92	
R 636(f)	Revolver Colt M^{le} 1909		8	8.3×27.5mmR	8mm Revolver M92	
R 637(f)	Revolver M^{le} 1892		8	8.3×27.5mmR	8mm Revolver M92	
P 642(f)	Pistolet automatique Astra M^{le} 1921		9	9×23mm	9mm Largo	
P 647(f)	Pistolet automatique Colt Espagnol		9	9×23mm	9mm Largo	(Note: Spanish-made Star Model A pistol.)
R 654(f)	Revolver M^{le} 1873 Revolver M^{le} 1874		11	11.46×17mmR	11mm French	
MP 721(f)	Pistolet-mitrailleur E.T.V.S.		7.65	7.65×20mm	7.65mm Longue	
MP 722(f)	Pistolet-mitrailleur de 7.65mm Modèle 1938	MAS M^{le} 38	7.65	7.65×20mm	7.65mm Longue	
MP 740(f)	Pistolet-mitrailleur Erma-Vollmer de 9mm		9	9×23mm	9mm Largo	
MP 761(f)	Pistolet-mitrailleur Thompson Modèle 1921	Thompson M^{le} 1921	11.43	11.43×23mm	.45 ACP	
G 241(f)	Fusil Berthier Modèle 1907/15 Modifié 34	Berthier M^{le} 07/15-M34	7.5	7.5×54mm	7.5mm MAS M29	
G 242(f)	Fusil à répétition de 7,5mm Modèle 1936	MAS M^{le} 36	7.5	7.5×54mm	7.5mm MAS M29	(Note: Also called the MAS-36.)
G 301(f)	Fusil Lebel Modèle 1886 Modifié 93	Lebel M^{le} 1886 M93	8	8×50mmR	8mm Lebel	
G 302(f)	Fusil Berthier Modèle 1907/15	Berthier M^{le} 07/15	8	8×50mmR	8mm Lebel	
G 303(f)	Fusil Lebel Modèle 1886 Modifié 93 - Raccourci 35	Lebel M^{le} 1886 M93-R35	8	8×50mmR	8mm Lebel	
G 304(f)	Fusil Berthier Modèle 1916	Berthier M^{le} 16	8	8×50mmR	8mm Lebel	
G 305(f)	Fusil Berthier Modèle 1907	Berthier M^{le} 1907	8	8×50mmR	8mm Lebel	
Sl.G 310(f)	Fusil Automatique M^{le} 1918	RSC M^{le} 1918	8	8×50mmR	8mm Lebel	
G 361(f)	Fusil Gras M^{le} 1874		11	11×59mmR	11mm Gras	
K 551(f)	Mousqueton Berthier M^{le} 1890		8	8×50mmR	8mm Lebel	
K 552(f)	Mousqueton Berthier M^{le} 1892		8	8×50mmR	8mm Lebel	
K 553(f)	Mousqueton Berthier M^{le} 1916		8	8×50mmR	8mm Lebel	
K 561(f)	Mousqueton Gras M^{le} 1874		11	11×59mmR	11mm Gras	
l.MG 105(f)	Fusil-mitrailleur Hotchkiss M^{le} 1922		6.5	6.5×53mmR	.256 Mannlicher	
l.MG 105(f)	Fusil-mitrailleur Hotchkiss M^{le} 1922		7	7×57mm	7mm Mauser	
l.MG 105(f)	Fusil-mitrailleur Hotchkiss M^{le} 1922		7.5	7.5×54mm	7.5mm MAS M29	
l.MG 105(f)	Fusil-mitrailleur Hotchkiss M^{le} 1922		7.92	7.92×57mm	7.92mm Mauser	
l.MG 105(f)	Fusil-mitrailleur Hotchkiss M^{le} 1922		8	8×50mmR	8mm Lebel	
l.MG 106(f)	Fusil-mitrailleur Darne M^{le} 1924		7.5	7.5×54mm	7.5mm MAS M29	
l.MG 106(f)	Fusil-mitrailleur Darne M^{le} 1924		8	8×50mmR	8mm Lebel	
l.MG 107(f)	Fusil-mitrailleur Lewis M^{le} 1924		6.5	6.5×53mmR	.256 Mannlicher	
l.MG 107(f)	Fusil-mitrailleur Lewis M^{le} 1924		8	8×50mmR	8mm Lebel	
l.MG 115(f)	Fusil-mitrailleur Modèle 1924	MAC M^{le} 24	7.5	7.5×57mm	7.5mm MAS M24	
l.MG 116(f)	Fusil-mitrailleur Modèle 1924 Modifié 29	MAC M^{le} 24 M29	7.5	7.5×54mm	7.5mm MAS M29	
l.MG 156(f)	Fusil-mitrailleur Modèle 1915 C.S.R.G	Chauchat M^{le} 1915	8	8×50mmR	8mm Lebel	
l.MG 157(f)	Fusil-mitrailleur Madsen Modèle 1922	Madsen M^{le} 1922	8	8×50mmR	8mm Lebel	
s.MG 256(f)	Mitrailleuse Automatique St. Étienne Modèle 1907	St. Étienne M^{le} 1907	8	8×50mmR	8mm Lebel	
s.MG 257(f)	Mitrailleuse Automatique Hotchkiss Modèle 1914	Hotchkiss M^{le} 1914	8	8×50mmR	8mm Lebel	
Kpfw. MG 331(f)	Mitrailleuse de 7,5mm M^{le} 1931	MAC M^{le} 1931	7.5	7.5×54mm	7.5mm MAS M29	
Flzg. MG 410(f)	Mitrailleuse d’Aviation M^{le} 1934 Fion Unitaire		7.5	7.5×54mm	7.5mm MAS M29	
Flzg. MG 411(f)	Mitrailleuse d’Aviation M^{le} 34 M39		7.5	7.5×54mm	7.5mm MAS M29	
Flzg. MG 412(f)	Mitrailleuse d’Aviation M^{le} 1934 T		7.5	7.5×54mm	7.5mm MAS M29	
MG 271(f)	Mitrailleuse Hotchkiss de 13,2mm Modèle 1930	13.2mm Hotchkiss M^{le} 30	13.2	13.2×99mm	13.2mm Hotchkiss M30	
MG 281(f)	Mitrailleuse Antiaérienne de 20mm Oerlikon Modèle 1939	20mm Oerlikon AA M^{le} 39	20	20×110mmRB		

=== (g)/Greece ===
Short Desig.	Model/Year	Cal.^{(mm)}	Cartridge		Notes
Short Desig.	Model/Year	Cal.^{(mm)}	Dimensions	Name	Notes
G 215(g)	Mannlicher-Schönauer	6.5	6.5×54mm	6.5mm Greek	
G 285(g)	Fabrique Nationale M1930	7.92	7.92×57mm	7.92mm Mauser	
G 301(g)	Lebel M^{le} 1886	8	8×50mmR	8mm Lebel	
G 302(g)	Lebel M^{le} 1907/15	8	8×50mmR	8mm Lebel	
G 305(g)	Lebel M^{le} 1907	8	8×50mmR	8mm Lebel	
G 306(g)	Mannlicher M.95 Rifle	8	8×50mmR	8mm Mannlicher	
K 417(g)	Mannlicher-Schönauer M1903	6.5	6.5×54mm	6.5mm Greek	
K 417/2(g)	Mannlicher-Schönauer M1903/14	6.5	6.5×54mm	6.5mm Greek	
K 494(g)	Mannlicher M.95/24 Carbine	7.92	7.92×57mm	7.92mm Mauser	
K 502(g)	Lebel M^{le} 1892	8	8×50mmR	8mm Lebel	
K 505(g)	Mannlicher M.95 Carbine	8	8×50mmR	8mm Mannlicher	
K 561(g)	Gras M^{le} 1874	11	11×59mmR	11mm Gras	
R 612(g)	Nagant 1895	7.62	7.62×38mmR	7.62mm Nagant	
R 613(g)	Nagant 1912	7.62	7.62×38mmR	7.62mm Nagant	
R 648(g)	Colt Official Police	9	9×29mmR	.38 Spl.	
R 649(g)	Smith & Wesson	9	9×29mmR	.38 Spl.	
l.MG 104(g)	Hotchkiss M^{le} 1926	6.5	6.5×54mm	6.5mm Greek	
l.MG 136(g)	Hotchkiss M^{le} 1909	7.7	7.7×56mmR	.303 British	
l.MG 152/1(g)	Hotchkiss M^{le} 1926	7.92	7.92×57mm	7.92mm Mauser	
l.MG 152/2(g)	Hotchkiss M^{le} 1926	7.92	7.92×57mm	7.92mm Mauser	
l.MG 156(g)	Fusil-mitrailleur M^{le} 1915	8	8×50mmR	8mm Lebel	
s.MG 202(g)	Schwarzlose M.7/12	6.5	6.5×54mm	6.5mm Greek	
s.MG 256(g)	St. Étienne M^{le} 1907	8	8×50mmR	8mm Lebel	

=== (h)/Netherlands ===
Short Desig.	Model/Year	Cal.^{(mm)}	Cartridge		Notes
Short Desig.	Model/Year	Cal.^{(mm)}	Dimensions	Name	Notes
P 626(h)	Pistool M.25 no.1	7.65	7.65×17mmSR	.32 ACP	
P 641(h)	Pistool M.25 no.2	9	9×17mm	.380 ACP	
R 643(h)	Revolver M.73	9.4	9.4×21mmR		
Kl.Kal.G 201(h)	Randvuurgeweer M.95 voor kamerschietoefeningen	5.5	5.5×7.5mmR		
G 211(h)	Geweer M.95	6.5	6.5×53.5mmR	.256 Mannlicher	
Grb.G 212(h)	Loopgraafgeweer M.95	6.5	6.5×53.5mmR	.256 Mannlicher	
Kl.Kal.K 401(h)	Randvuurkarabijn M.95 voor kamerschietoefeningen	5.5	5.5×7.5mmR		
K 411(h)	Karabijn M.95 No.1 Nieuw Model	6.5	6.5×53.5mmR	.256 Mannlicher	
K 412(h)	Karabijn M.95 No.1 Oud Model	6.5	6.5×53.5mmR	.256 Mannlicher	
K 413(h)	Karabijn M.95 No.3 Oud Model Karabijn M.95 No.3 Nieuw Model	6.5	6.5×53.5mmR	.256 Mannlicher	
K 414(h)	Karabijn M.95 No.4 Oud Model Karabijn M.95 No.4 Nieuw Model	6.5	6.5×53.5mmR	.256 Mannlicher	
l.MG 100(h)	Mitrailleur M.20	6.5	6.5×53.5mmR	.256 Mannlicher	
s.MG 231(h)	Mitrailleur M.18 No.1	7.7	7.7×56mmR	.303 British	
s.MG 241(h)	Mitrailleur M.08	7.92	7.92×57mmR	7.92mm Dutch	(Note: Weapon features: Barrel has 4 locking pins; Cap lock on the left side; Cam gear has 6 teeth; Trigger consists of 2 parts)
s.MG 242(h)	Mitrailleur M.08/13	7.92	7.92×57mmR	7.92mm Dutch	(Note: Weapon features: Barrel has 5 locking pins; Cap lock on the left side; Cam gear has 18 teeth; Trigger consists of 3 parts)
s.MG 243(h)	Mitrailleur M.08/15	7.92	7.92×57mmR	7.92mm Dutch	(Note: Weapon features: Barrel has 5 locking pins; Cap lock on the left side; Cam gear has 18 teeth; Trigger consists of 3 parts; Long water jacket; Foldable handles)
s.MG 244(h)	Cavaleriemitrailleur M.08/15	7.92	7.92×57mmR	7.92mm Dutch	(Note: Weapon features: Barrel has 5 locking pins; Cap lock on the left side; Cam gear has 18 teeth; Trigger consists of 3 parts; Short water jacket; Foldable handles)
Flzg. MG 401(h)	Mitrailleur M.08 Vliegtuig	6.5	6.5×53.5mmR	.256 Mannlicher	
Flzg. MG 402(h)	Mitrailleur M.20 Vliegtuig	6.5	6.5×53.5mmR	.256 Mannlicher	
Flzg. MG 425(h)	Vliegtuigmitrailleur M.36 No.3	7.7	7.7×56mmR	.303 British	(Note: The gun model is the FN-Browning M.36 No.3.)
Pz.B 785(h)	Tankbuks M.38	20	20×138mmB	20mm Solothurn	

=== (i)/Italy ===
Short Desig.	Model/Year	Cal.^{(mm)}	Cartridge		Notes
Short Desig.	Model/Year	Cal.^{(mm)}	Dimensions	Name	Notes
P 670(i)	Pistola Glisenti Modello 1910	9	9×19mm	9mm Glisenti	
P 671(i)	Pistola Beretta Modello 1934	9	9×17mm	9mm Corto	
R 680(i)	Pistola a Rotazione, Sistema Bodeo, Modello 1889	10.35	10.35×20mmR	10.35mm Italian	
MP 738(i)	Moschetto Automatico Beretta Modello 38/42	9	9×19mm	9mm M38	
MP 739(i)	Moschetto Automatico Beretta Modello 38	9	9×19mm	9mm M38	
Sl.G 208(i)	Fucile semiautomatico Modello 39	6.5	6.5×52mm	6.5mm Carcano	
G 209(i)	Fucile corto Modello 91/38	6.5	6.5×52mm	6.5mm Carcano	
G 210(i)	Fucile Modello 41	6.5	6.5×52mm	6.5mm Carcano	
G 214(i)	Fucile Modello 91	6.5	6.5×52mm	6.5mm Carcano	
G 231(i)	Fucile corto Modello 38	7.35	7.35×51mm	7.35mm Carcano	
G 306(i)	Fucile Mannlicher Modello 95	8	8×50mmR	8mm Mannlicher	
Ausb. K 407(i)	Moschetto-Balilla	6.5			
K 408(i)	Moschetto Modello 91/38	6.5	6.5×52mm	6.5mm Carcano	
K 409(i)	Moschetto Modello 91	6.5	6.5×52mm	6.5mm Carcano	
K 410(i)	Moschetto Modello 91 TS	6.5	6.5×52mm	6.5mm Carcano	
K 416(i)	Moschetto Modello 91/24	6.5	6.5×52mm	6.5mm Carcano	
K 430(i)	Moschetto Modello 38	7.35	7.35×51mm	7.35mm Carcano	
K 505(i)	Moschetto Mannlicher Modello 95	8	8×50mmR	8mm Mannlicher	
l.MG 096(i)	Mitragliatrice Leggera SIA Modello 18	6.5	6.5×52mm	6.5mm Carcano	
l.MG 097(i)	Mitragliatrice Leggera Fiat Modello 26	6.5	6.5×52mm	6.5mm Carcano	
l.MG 098(i)	Mitragliatrice Leggera Breda tipo 5C	6.5	6.5×52mm	6.5mm Carcano	
l.MG 099(i)	Fucile Mitragliatore Breda Modello 30	6.5	6.5×52mm	6.5mm Carcano	
s.MG 200(i)	Mitragliatrice Fiat–Revelli Modello 1914	6.5	6.5×52mm	6.5mm Carcano	
s.MG 255(i)	Mitragliatrice Fiat–Revelli Modello 1935	8	8×59mm Rb	8mm Breda	
s.MG 259(i)	Mitragliatrice Breda Modello 37	8	8×59mm Rb	8mm Breda	
s.MG 261(i)	Mitragliatrice Schwarzlose Modello 07/12	8	8×50mmR	8mm Mannlicher	
Kpfw. MG 350(i)	Mitragliatrice Breda Modello 38 per carri armati	8	8×59mm Rb	8mm Breda	
MG 282 (i)	Cannone-Mitragliera da 20/65 modello 35	20	20×138mmB	20mm Solothurn	
Pz.B 770(i)	Fucile controcarro 35(P)	7.92	7.92×107mm	7.92mm DS	
Pz.B 785(i)	Fucile anticarro tipo S.	20	20×138mmB	20mm Solothurn	

=== (j)/Yugoslavia ===
Short Desig.	Model/Year	Cal.^{(mm)}	Cartridge		Notes
Short Desig.	Model/Year	Cal.^{(mm)}	Dimensions	Name	Notes
P 641(j)	Automatski pistolj 9 mm M.22	9	9×17mm	.380 ACP	
MP 760(j)	Mitraljez pištolj 11,43 mm M.28	11.43	11.43×23mm	.45 ACP	
G 214(j)	Puška 6,5 mm M.91i	6.5	6.5×52mm		
G 221(j)	Puška 7 mm M.10C	7	7×57mm		
G 222(j)	Puška 7 mm M.99	7	7×57mm		
G 223(j)	Puška 7 mm M.80/07C	7	7×57mm		
G 252(j)	Puška 7,62 mm M.91R	7.62	7.62×54mmR		
G 288(j)	Sokol-Puška 7,92 mm	7.92	7.92×57mm	7.92mm Mauser	(Note: A Mauser 98-type carbine misidentified as a youth training carbine.)
G 289(j)	Komitern-Puška 7,92 mm	7.92	7.92×57mm	7.92mm Mauser	(Note: Chetnik Puska 7,92 mm M.24ČK.)
G 290(j)	Puška 7,92 mm M.24	7.92	7.92×57mm	7.92mm Mauser	
G 291/1(j)	Puška 7,92 mm M.24	7.92	7.92×57mm	7.92mm Mauser	
G 291/2(j)	Puška 7,92 mm M.24B	7.92	7.92×57mm	7.92mm Mauser	
G 291/3(j)	Puška 7,92 mm M.10C	7.92	7.92×57mm	7.92mm Mauser	
G 291/4(j)	Puška 7,92 mm M.99C	7.92	7.92×57mm	7.92mm Mauser	
G 292 (j)	Puška 7,92 mm M.88/24	7.92	7.92×57mm	7.92mm Mauser	
G 293(j)	Puška 7,92 mm M.98	7.92	7.92×57mm	7.92mm Mauser	
G 294(j)	Karabini 7,92 mm M.95/24	7.92	7.92×57mm	7.92mm Mauser	
G 295(j)	Puška 7,92 mm M.09T	7.92	7.92×57mm	7.92mm Mauser	
G 296(j)	Puška 7,92 mm M.99T	7.92	7.92×57mm	7.92mm Mauser	
G 297(j)	Puška 7,92 mm M.90T	7.92	7.92×57mm	7.92mm Mauser	
G 298(j)	Puška 7,92 mm M.29	7.92	7.92×57mm	7.92mm Mauser	
G 301(j)	Puška 8 mm M.86	8	8×50mmR		
G 302(j)	Puška 8 mm M.07/15F	8	8×50mmR		
G 304(j)	Puška 8 mm M.16F	8	8×50mmR		
G 306(j)	Puška 8 mm M.95	8	8×50mmR M93		
G 307(j)	Puška 8 mm M.93MR	8	8×50mmR M93		
G 308(j)	Puška 8 mm M.74F	8	8×50mmR		
G 309(j)	Puška 8 mm M.91R	8	8×50mmR M93		
G 352(j)	Puška 10,15 mm M.78/80	10.15	10.15×63mmR		
G 361(j)	Puška 11 mm M.74	11	11×59mmR		
K 416(j)	Karabini 6,5 mm M.95i	6.5	6.5×52mm		
K 421(j)	Karabini 7 mm M.08C	7	7×57mm		
K 491/1(j)	Karabini 7,92 mm M.24	7.92	7.92×57mm		
K 491/2(j)	Karabini 7,92 mm M.24B	7.92	7.92×57mm		
K 491/3(j)	Karabini 7,92 mm M.10C	7.92	7.92×57mm		
K 491/4(j)	Karabini 7,92 mm M.99C	7.92	7.92×57mm		
K 492(j)	Karabini 7,92 mm M.98	7.92	7.92×57mm		
K 502(j)	Karabini 8 mm M.07/15F	8	8×50mmR		
K 503(j)	Karabini 8 mm M.16F	8	8×50mmR		
K 505(j)	Karabini 8 mm M.95	8	8×50mmR M93		
K 561(j)	Karabini 11 mm M.74	11	11×59mmR		
l.MG 145(j)	Puškomitraljez 7,92 mm M.08/15	7.92	7.92×57mm		
l.MG 146/1(j)	Puškomitraljez 7,92 mm M.26	7.92	7.92×57mm		
l.MG 147(j)	Puškomitraljez 7,9 mm M.15/26	7.9	7.9×57mm	7.9mm M/88	
l.MG 148(j)	Puškomitraljez 7,92 mm M.37	7.92	7.92×57mm	7.92mm Mauser	
l.MG 156(j)	Puškomitraljez 8 mm M.15	8	8×50mmR		
s.MG 200(j)	Mitraljez 6,5 mm M.14i	6.5	6.5×52mm		
s.MG 246(j)	Mitraljez 7,92 mm M.40	7.92	7.92×57mm	7.92mm Mauser	
s.MG 247(j)	Mitraljez 7,92 mm M.07/12S	7.92	7.92×57mm	7.92mm Mauser	
s.MG 248(j)	Mitraljez 7,92 mm M.08M	7.92	7.92×57mm	7.92mm Mauser	
s.MG 256(j)	Mitraljez 8 mm M.07/15	8	8×50mmR		
s.MG 257(j)	Mitraljez 8 mm M.14H	8	8×50mmR		
Fla. MG 490(j)	Mitraljez 15 mm M.38	15	15×104mm	15mm Brno	

=== (n)/Norway ===
Short Desig.	Model/Year	Cal.^{(mm)}	Cartridge		Notes
Short Desig.	Model/Year	Cal.^{(mm)}	Dimensions	Name	Notes
R 610(n)	Nagant M1893				
P 657(n)	Kongsberg Colt				
G 211(n)	Gevær m/94				
Zf.G 212(n)	Gevær m/94 med maal-teleskop				
G 213(n)	Gevær m/30				
G 351(n)	Gevær m/84				
K 411(n)	Kavalerikarabin m/94				
K 412(n)	Kavalerikarabin m/95				
K 413(n)	Ingeniörkarabin m/04				
K 414(n)	Artillerikarabin m/07				
K 415(n)	Karabin m/12				
K 504(n)	Kammerlader Karabin				
l.MG 102(n)	Maskingevær m/14				
l.MG 103(n)	Maskingevær m/22				
s.MG 201(n)	Hotchkiss 6,5 mm Mitraljøse m/98				
s.MG 240(n)	Hotchkiss 7,92 mm Mitraljøse m/98				
s.MG 245/1(n)	Colt 7,92 mm Mitraljøse m/29				
s.MG 245/2(n)	Colt 7,92 mm Mitraljøse m/29				

=== (ö)/Austria ===
Short Desig.	Weapon Model/Year			Image
Short Desig.	Full Name	Comp. Name	Alt. Name	Image
P 12(ö)	Pistole M.12	Steyr P 12	Steyr-Hahn	
MP 34(ö)	Maschinenpistole 34	Steyr MP 34	Steyr-Solothurn S1-100	
G 29(ö)	Gewehr 12/34	Mauser G12/34	Steyr-Mauser M.12/34	
G 29/40(ö)	Gewehr 29/40	Steyr G29/40	Steyr M.29/40	
G 95(ö)	Gewehr M.95	Steyr G95		
G 95/30(ö)	Gewehr M.95/30	Steyr G95/30		
S 95(ö)	Stutzen M.95			
S 95/30(ö)	Stutzen M.95/30			
l.MG 30(ö)	Maschinengewehr 30	Solothurn MG 30	Steyr-Solothurn S2-200	
s.MG 7/12(ö)	Maschinengewehr M.07/12	Schwarzlose MG 07/12		

=== (p)/Poland ===
Designation		Weapon Model/Year			Image
Short	Alt.	Full Name	Comp. Name	Alt. Name	Image
P 645(p)	P 35(p)	Pistolet wz. 35	Pl. wz. 35 Vis	Vis wz. 35	
R 612(p)		Rewolwer wz. 30	Rw. wz. 30 Nagant	Nagant wz. 30	
G 298(p)	G 29(p)	Karabinek wz. 29	Kbk wz. 29		
G 299(p)	G 98(p)	Karabin wz. 98a	Kb wz. 98a		
K 493(p)	K 98(p)	Karabinek wz. 98	Kbk wz. 98		
K 497(p)		Karabinek wz. 91/98/25	Kbk wz. 91/98/25		
l.MG 154/1(p)	l.MG 28(p)	Reczny karabin maszynowy wz. 28	Rkm wz. 28	Browning wz. 28	
l.MG 154/2(p)	l.MG 28(p)	Reczny karabin maszynowy wz. 28	Rkm wz. 28	Browning wz. 28	
s.MG 238(p)		Ciężki karabin maszynowy wz. 25	Ckm wz. 25	Hotchkiss wz. 25	
s.MG 248(p)		Ciężki karabin maszynowy wz. 08	Ckm wz. 08		
s.MG 249(p)	s.MG 30(p)	Ciężki karabin maszynowy wz. 30	Ckm wz. 30		
s.MG 257(p)		Ciężki karabin maszynowy wz. 14	Ckm wz. 14	Hotchkiss wz. 14	

=== (r)/Soviet Union ===
Short Desig.	Weapon Model/Year		Image
Short Desig.	Full name	Compact name	Image
R 612(r)		Nagant M1895	
P 615(r)	Samozaryadny pistolet Tokareva obr. 1930	TT-30	
MP 41(r)		PPSh-41 (9mm)	
MP 715(r)		PPD-40	
MP 716(r)		PPD-34/38	
MP 717(r)		PPSh-41	
MP 718(r)		PPS-42	
MP 719(r)		PPS-43	
MP 760(r)		Thompson M1928	
MP 760/2(r)		Thompson M1928A1	
MP 761(r)		Thompson M1921	
MP 762(r)		M50 Reising	
Kl.Kal.G 205(r)		TOZ No.8	
Kl.Kal.G 206(r)		TOZ No.9	
G 252(r)	Pekhotnaya vintovka Mosina obr. 1891	Mosin–Nagant M91; Infantry Rifle	
G 253(r)	Dragunskaya vintovka Mosina obr. 1891	Mosin–Nagant M91; Dragoon Rifle	
G 254(r)	Vintovka Mosina obr. 1891/30	Mosin–Nagant M91/30	
G 255(r)	Vintovka Vinchester obr. 1895	Winchester M1895	
Zf.G 256(r)	Vintovka Mosina obr. 1891/30 (s pritselom PU)	Mosin–Nagant M91/30 (w/ PU scope)	
Sl.G 257(r)		AVS-36	
Sl.G 258(r)		SVT-38	
Sl.G 259(r)		SVT-40	
Sl.G 259/2(r)		SVT-40	
Sl.Zf.G 260(r)		SVT-40 (w/ PU scope)	
G 280(r)		Ross Mk.III	
G 282(r)		Enfield P14	
G 291/1(r)		Mauzeris 24L	
G 298(r)	Karabin obr. 1929	Karabinek wz. 1929	
G 299(r)	Vintovka obr. 1898a	Karabin wz. 98a	
K 453(r)	Karabin Mosina obr. 1907	Mosin–Nagant M07; Carbine	
K 454(r)	Karabin Mosina obr. 1938	Mosin–Nagant M38; Carbine	
K 457(r)	Karabin Mosina obr. 1944	Mosin–Nagant M44; Carbine	
K 493(r)	Karabin obr. 1898	Karabinek wz. 98	
l.MG 120(r)	Pulemyot Degtyaryova Pekhotny obr. 1927	DP-27	
l.MG 121(r)	Pulemyot Maksim–Tokarev Pekhotny	MTP-25	
l.MG 122(r)	Pulemyot Lewis Pekhotny	Lewis Mk I	
l.MG 135/2(r)	Pulemyot Vikkers–Bert'ye Pekhotny	Vickers–Berthier Mk I	
l.MG 145(r)	Pulemyot Maksima Pekhotny obr. 1908/15	MG 08/15	
l.MG 146/2(r)	Pulemyot Pekhotny obr. 1926	ZB-26	
s.MG 216(r)	Pulyemyot Maksima obr. 1910	PM M1910	
s.MG 218(r)		DS-39	
s.MG 230(r)	Pulyemyot Vickers obr. 1912	Vickers M1912	
s.MG 248(r)	Pulyemyot Maksima obr. 1908	MG 08	
Kpfw. MG 320(r)		DT-29	
Flzg. MG 417/1(r)		ShKAS	
Flzg. MG 417/2(r)		ShKAS	
Flzg. MG 418/1(r)		DA-28	
Flzg. MG 418/2(r)		DA-28	
MG 268(r)		DShK M1938	
Pz.B 775(r)		PTR Sholokhov	
Pz.B 776(r)		PTR M1918?	
Pz.B 783(r)		PTRD-41	
Sl.Pz.B 784(r)		PTRS-41	

=== (t)/Czechoslovakia ===
Short Desig.	Weapon Model/Year		Image
Short Desig.	Full Name	Alt. Name	Image
P 24(t)	Pistole vz. 24		
P 27(t)	Pistole vz. 27		
P 39(t)	Pistole vz. 38		
MP (t)	Samopal vz. 42 (Note: Name for the ZK-383 after it was adopted by Slovak Republic.)	ZK-383	
G 24(t)	Puška vz. 24		
G 33(t)	Puška vz. 33		
G 33/40(t)	Puška vz. 33/40		
G 95(t)	Puška vz. 95		
l.MG 26(t)	Lehký Kulomet vz. 26	ZB-26	
l.MG 30(t)	Lehký Kulomet vz. 30	ZB-30	
s.MG 24(t)	Těžký Kulomet vz. 24	ŠZ-24	
s.MG 37(t)	Těžký Kulomet vz. 37	ZB-53	
Flzg. MG 30(t)	Letecky Kulomet vz. 30	ČZ-30	
Fla. MG 39(t)	Těžký Kulomet vz. 39	ZB-60	

=== (u)/Hungary ===
Short Desig.	Model/Year	Image
P 37(u)	Pisztoly 37M	
G 98/40(u)	Gewehr 98/40	

== Sort by weapon type ==
=== Pistols/Revolvers ===
Designation			Weapon Model	Cal.^{(mm)}	Cartridge		Notes
Num.	Short	Alt.	Weapon Model	Cal.^{(mm)}	Dimensions	Name	Notes
610(n)	R 610(n)		Nagant M1893	7.5	7.5×22mmR	7.5mm Swedish	
612(p)	R 612(p)		Nagant wz. 30	7.62	7.62×38mmR	7.62mm Nagant	
612(r)	R 612(r)		Nagant M1895	7.62	7.62×38mmR	7.62mm Nagant	
615(r)	P 615(r)		TT-30	7.62	7.62×25mm	7.62mm Tokarev	
620(b)	P 620(b)		Pistolet M^{le} 1900	7.65	7.65×17mmSR	.32 ACP	
621(b)	P 621(b)		Pistolet M^{le} 1910	7.65	7.65×17mmSR	.32 ACP	
622(b)	P 622(b)		Colt M1903	7.65	7.65×17mmSR	.32 ACP	
626(b)	P 626(b)		Browning M^{le} 1922	7.65	7.65×17mmSR	.32 ACP	
? (t)		P 27(t)	Pistole vz. 27	7.65	7.65×17mmSR	.32 ACP	
? (u)		P 37(u)	Pisztoly 37M	7.65	7.65×17mmSR	.32 ACP	
640(b)	P 640(b)		Browning GP-35	9	9×19mm	9mm Luger	
? (ö)		P 12(ö)	Pistole M.12	9	9×19mm	9mm Luger	
641(b)	P 641(b)		Browning M^{le} 1922	9	9×17mm	.380 ACP	
645(p)	P 645(p)	P 35(p)	Vis wz. 35	9	9×19mm	9mm Luger	
? (t)		P 24(t)	Pistole vz. 24	9	9×17mm	.380 ACP	
? (t)		P 39(t)	Pistole vz. 38	9	9×17mm	.380 ACP	
646(e)	R 646(e)		Enfield No. 2 Mk I	9.2	9.2×20mmR	.380 Revolver	
655(e)	R 655(e)		Webley No. 1 Mk IV	11.55	11.55×19.3mmR	.455 Webley	
657(n)	P 657(n)		Kongsberg Colt	11.43	11.43×23mm	.45 ACP	
660(a)	P 660(a)		M1911 Pistol	11.43	11.43×23mm	.45 ACP	
661(a)	R 661(a)		M1917 Revolver	11.43	11.43×23mm	.45 ACP	Made by Colt.
662(a)	R 662(a)		M1917 Revolver	11.43	11.43×23mm	.45 ACP	Made by Smith & Wesson.

=== Submachine guns ===
Designation			Weapon Model	Cal.^{(mm)}	Cartridge		Notes
Num.	Short	Alt.	Weapon Model	Cal.^{(mm)}	Dimensions	Name	Notes
715(r)	MP 715(r)		PPD-40	7.62	7.62×25mm	7.62mm Tokarev	
716(r)	MP 716(r)		PPD-34/38	7.62	7.62×25mm	7.62mm Tokarev	
717(r)	MP 717(r)		PPSh-41	7.62	7.62×25mm	7.62mm Tokarev	
718(r)	MP 718(r)		PPS-42	7.62	7.62×25mm	7.62mm Tokarev	
719(r)	MP 719(r)		PPS-43	7.62	7.62×25mm	7.62mm Tokarev	
740(b)	MP 740(b)		Mi 34 Schmeisser-Bayard	9	9×19mm	9mm Luger	
741(d)	MP 741(d)		Maskinpistol M/32	9	9×23mm	9mm Largo	
746(d)	MP 746(d)		Maskinpistol M/41	9	9×19mm	9mm Luger	
		MP 34(ö)	Maschinenpistole 34	9	9×19mm	9mm Luger	
		MP (t)	ZK-383	9	9×19mm	9mm Luger	
760(a)	MP 760(a)		M1928 Thompson	11.43	11.43×23mm	.45 ACP	Equipped with vertical foregrip.
760(e)	MP 760(e)		M1928 Thompson	11.43	11.43×23mm	.45 ACP	Equipped with vertical foregrip.
760(j)	MP 760(j)		M1928 Thompson	11.43	11.43×23mm	.45 ACP	Equipped with vertical foregrip.
760(r)	MP 760(r)		M1928 Thompson	11.43	11.43×23mm	.45 ACP	Equipped with vertical foregrip.
760/2(a)	MP 760/2(a)		M1928A1 Thompson	11.43	11.43×23mm	.45 ACP	Equipped with horizontal handguard.
760/2(e)	MP 760/2(e)		M1928A1 Thompson	11.43	11.43×23mm	.45 ACP	Equipped with horizontal handguard.
760/2(r)	MP 760/2(r)		M1928A1 Thompson	11.43	11.43×23mm	.45 ACP	Equipped with horizontal handguard.
761(a)	MP 761(a)		M1921 Thompson	11.43	11.43×23mm	.45 ACP	
761(e)	MP 761(e)		M1921 Thompson	11.43	11.43×23mm	.45 ACP	
761(f)	MP 761(f)		M1921 Thompson	11.43	11.43×23mm	.45 ACP	
761(r)	MP 761(r)		M1921 Thompson	11.43	11.43×23mm	.45 ACP	
762(a)	MP 762(a)		M50 Reising	11.43	11.43×23mm	.45 ACP	
762(r)	MP 762(r)		M50 Reising	11.43	11.43×23mm	.45 ACP	
763(a)	MP 763(a)		M3 Submachine Gun	11.43	11.43×23mm	.45 ACP	

=== Rifles ===
Designation			Weapon Model	Cal.^{(mm)}	Cartridge		Notes
Num.	Short	Alt.	Weapon Model	Cal.^{(mm)}	Dimensions	Name	Notes
205(r)	Kl.Kal.G 205(r)		TOZ No.8	5.7	5.7×15mmR	.22 LR	
206(r)	Kl.Kal.G 206(r)		TOZ No.9	5.7	5.7×15mmR	.22 LR	
211(n)	G 211(n)		Krag-Jørgensen m/94	6.5	6.5×55mm	6.5mm Swedish	
212(n)	Zf.G 212(n)		Krag-Jørgensen m/94 (telescope)	6.5	6.5×55mm	6.5mm Swedish	
213(n)	G 213(n)		Krag-Jørgensen m/30	6.5	6.5×55mm	6.5mm Swedish	
252(r)	G 252(r)		Mosin–Nagant M91; Infantry Rifle	7.62	7.62×54mmR	7.62mm Russian	
253(r)	G 253(r)		Mosin–Nagant M91; Dragoon Rifle	7.62	7.62×54mmR	7.62mm Russian	
254(r)	G 254(r)		Mosin–Nagant M91/30	7.62	7.62×54mmR	7.62mm Russian	
255(r)	G 255(r)		Winchester M1895	7.62	7.62×54mmR	7.62mm Russian	
256(r)	Zf.G 256(r)		Mosin–Nagant M91/30 (w/ PU scope)	7.62	7.62×54mmR	7.62mm Russian	
257(r)	Sl.G 257(r)		AVS-36	7.62	7.62×54mmR	7.62mm Russian	
258(r)	Sl.G 258(r)		SVT-38	7.62	7.62×54mmR	7.62mm Russian	
259(r)	Sl.G 259(r)		SVT-40	7.62	7.62×54mmR	7.62mm Russian	Standard rifle length.
259/2(r)	Sl.G 259/2(r)		SVT-40	7.62	7.62×54mmR	7.62mm Russian	Carbine length. It is unknown whether it either indicated a SKT-40 or just a shortened SVT-40.
260(r)	Sl.Zf.G 260(r)		SVT-40 (w/ PU scope)	7.62	7.62×54mmR	7.62mm Russian	
280(r)	G 280(r)		Ross Mk.III	7.7	7.7×56mmR	.303 British	Captured from Latvia, as well as some being supplied as Lend-Lease equipment.
282(r)	G 282(r)		Enfield P14	7.7	7.7×56mmR	.303 British	Captured from Latvia after the occupation of the Baltic in 1940.
? (ö)		G 29(ö)	Gewehr 12/34 (Note: Mauser-pattern carbine for Chile, chambered for 8mm Mauser instead of the Chilean 7mm.)	7.92	7.92×57mm	7.92mm Mauser	
? (ö)		G 29/40(ö)	Gewehr 29/40 (Note: A (practically identical) clone of the Kar 98k using the Polish Karabinek wz. 1929 as the base.)	7.92	7.92×57mm	7.92mm Mauser	
291/1(r)	G 291/1(r)		Mauzeris 24L	7.92	7.92×57mm	7.92mm Mauser	Captured from Lithuania after the occupation of the Baltic in 1940.
298(p)	G 298(p)	G 29(p)	Karabinek wz. 29	7.92	7.92×57mm	7.92mm Mauser	
298(r)	G 298(r)		Karabinek wz. 29	7.92	7.92×57mm	7.92mm Mauser	Captured from Poland after the Soviet invasion of Poland in 1939.
299(p)	G 299(p)	G 98(p)	Karabin wz. 98a	7.92	7.92×57mm	7.92mm Mauser	
299(r)	G 299(r)		Karabin wz. 98a	7.92	7.92×57mm	7.92mm Mauser	Captured from Poland after the Soviet invasion of Poland in 1939.
? (t)		G 24(t)	Puška vz. 24	7.92	7.92×57mm	7.92mm Mauser	
? (t)		G 33(t)	Puška vz. 33	7.92	7.92×57mm	7.92mm Mauser	
? (t)		G 33/40(t)	Puška vz. 33/40 (Note: This is the Gewehr 33/40 made in 1941 and 1942, during the German occupation of Czechoslovakia for the Wehrmacht (German armed forces), especially for use in the Gebirgsjäger (German mountain troops).)	7.92	7.92×57mm	7.92mm Mauser	
? (u)		G 98/40(u)	Gewehr 98/40	7.92	7.92×57mm	7.92mm Mauser	
? (ö)		G 95(ö)	Mannlicher M.95	8	8×50mmR	8mm Mannlicher	
? (t)		G 95(t)	Mannlicher M.95	8	8×50mmR	8mm Mannlicher	
? (ö)		S 95(ö)	Stutzen M.95	8	8×50mmR	8mm Mannlicher	
? (ö)		G 95/30(ö)	Gewehr M.95/30	8	8×56mmR	8mm Steyr	
? (ö)		S 95/30(ö)	Stutzen M.95/30	8	8×56mmR	8mm Steyr	
351(n)	G 351(n)		Gevær m/84	10.15	10.15×61mmR	10.15mm Jarmann	

=== Carbines ===
Designation			Weapon Model	Cal.^{(mm)}	Cartridge		Notes
Num.	Short	Alt.	Weapon Model	Cal.^{(mm)}	Dimensions	Name	Notes
411(n)	K 411(n)		Kavalerikarabin m/94	6.5	6.5×55mm	6.5mm Swedish	
412(n)	K 412(n)		Kavalerikarabin m/95	6.5	6.5×55mm	6.5mm Swedish	
413(n)	K 413(n)		Ingeniörkarabin m/04	6.5	6.5×55mm	6.5mm Swedish	
414(n)	K 414(n)		Artillerikarabin m/07	6.5	6.5×55mm	6.5mm Swedish	
415(n)	K 415(n)		Karabin m/12	6.5	6.5×55mm	6.5mm Swedish	
453(r)	K 453(r)		Mosin–Nagant M07; Carbine	7.62	7.62×54mmR	7.62mm Russian	
454(r)	K 454(r)		Mosin–Nagant M38; Carbine	7.62	7.62×54mmR	7.62mm Russian	
457(r)	K 457(r)		Mosin–Nagant M44; Carbine	7.62	7.62×54mmR	7.62mm Russian	
493(p)	K 493(p)	K 98(p)	Karabinek wz. 98	7.92	7.92×57mm	7.92mm Mauser	
493(r)	K 493(r)		Karabinek wz. 98	7.92	7.92×57mm	7.92mm Mauser	Captured from Poland after the Soviet invasion of Poland in 1939.
497(p)	K 497(p)		Karabinek wz. 91/98/25	7.92	7.92×57mm	7.92mm Mauser	
504(n)	K 504(n)		Kammerlader Karabin	12.17	12.17×42mmR	12.17mm RF	

=== Light machine guns ===
Designation			Weapon Model	Cal.^{(mm)}	Cartridge		Notes
Num.	Short	Alt.	Weapon Model	Cal.^{(mm)}	Dimensions	Name	Notes
102(n)	l.MG 102(n)		Maskingevær m/14	6.5	6.5×55mm	6.5mm Swedish	
103(n)	l.MG 103(n)		Maskingevær m/22	6.5	6.5×55mm	6.5mm Swedish	
120(r)	l.MG 120(r)		DP-27	7.62	7.62×54mmR	7.62mm Russian	
121(r)	l.MG 121(r)		MTP-25	7.62	7.62×54mmR	7.62mm Russian	
122(r)	l.MG 122(r)		Lewis Mk I	7.62	7.62×54mmR	7.62mm Russian	
135/2(r)	l.MG 135/2(r)		Vickers–Berthier Mk I	7.7	7.7×56mmR	.303 British	Captured from Latvia after the occupation of the Baltic in 1940.
145(r)	l.MG 145(r)		MG 08/15	7.92	7.92×57mm	7.92mm Mauser	Captured from Lithuania after the occupation of the Baltic in 1940.
146/2(r)	l.MG 146/2(r)		ZB-26	7.92	7.92×57mm	7.92mm Mauser	Captured from Lithuania after the occupation of the Baltic in 1940.
? (t)		l.MG 26(t)	ZB-26	7.92	7.92×57mm	7.92mm Mauser	
? (t)		l.MG 30(t)	ZB-30	7.92	7.92×57mm	7.92mm Mauser	
154/1(p)	l.MG 154/1(p)	l.MG 28(p)	Rkm wz. 28	7.92	7.92×57mm	7.92mm Mauser	
154/2(p)	l.MG 154/2(p)	l.MG 28(p)	Rkm wz. 28	7.92	7.92×57mm	7.92mm Mauser	
? (ö)		l.MG 30(ö)	Solothurn MG 30	8	8×56mmR	8mm Steyr	

=== Heavy machine guns ===
Designation			Weapon Model	Cal.^{(mm)}	Cartridge		Notes
Num.	Short	Alt.	Weapon Model	Cal.^{(mm)}	Dimensions	Name	Notes
201(n)	s.MG 201(n)		Hotchkiss m/98	6.5	6.5×55mm	6.5mm Swedish	
216(r)	s.MG 216(r)		PM M1910	7.62	7.62×54mmR	7.62mm Russian	
218(r)	s.MG 218(r)		DS-39	7.62	7.62×54mmR	7.62mm Russian	
230(r)	s.MG 230(r)		Vickers M1912	7.7	7.7×56mmR	.303 British	Captured from Latvia after the occupation of the Baltic in 1940.
238(p)	s.MG 238(p)		Ckm wz. 25	7.92	7.92×57mm	7.92mm Mauser	
240(n)	s.MG 240(n)		Hotchkiss 7,92 mm Mitraljøse m/98	7.92	7.92×61mm	7.92mm Norwegian	
245/1(n)	s.MG 245/1(n)		Colt 7,92 mm Mitraljøse m/29	7.92	7.92×61mm	7.92mm Norwegian	(Note: Could use German-made 7.92mm Mauser ammunition.)
245/2(n)	s.MG 245/2(n)		Colt 7,92 mm Mitraljøse m/29	7.92	7.92×61mm	7.92mm Norwegian	(Note: Could not use German-made 7.92mm Mauser ammunition.)
248(p)	s.MG 248(p)		MG 08	7.92	7.92×57mm	7.92mm Mauser	
248(r)	s.MG 248(r)		MG 08	7.92	7.92×57mm	7.92mm Mauser	Captured from Lithuania after the occupation of the Baltic in 1940.
249(p)	s.MG 249(p)	s.MG 30(p)	Ckm wz. 30	7.92	7.92×57mm	7.92mm Mauser	
? (t)		s.MG 24(t)	ŠZ-24	7.92	7.92×57mm	7.92mm Mauser	
? (t)		s.MG 37(t)	ZB-53	7.92	7.92×57mm	7.92mm Mauser	
? (ö)		s.MG 7/12(ö)	Schwarzlose MG 07/12	8	8×56mmR	8mm Steyr	
257(p)	s.MG 257(p)		Ckm wz. 14	8	8×50mmR	8mm Lebel	
268(r)	MG 268(r)		DShK M1938	12.7	12.7×108mm	12.7mm Russian	

=== Tank machine guns ===
Designation			Model/Year	Cal.^{(mm)}	Cartridge		Notes
Num.	Short	Alt.	Model/Year	Cal.^{(mm)}	Dimensions	Name	Notes
320(r)	Kpfw. MG 320(r)		DT-29	7.62	7.62×54mmR	7.62mm Russian	

=== Aircraft/Anti-Aircraft machine guns ===
Designation			Weapon Model	Cal.^{(mm)}	Cartridge		Notes
Num.	Short	Alt.	Weapon Model	Cal.^{(mm)}	Dimensions	Name	Notes
417/1(r)	Flzg. MG 417/1(r)		ShKAS	7.62	7.62×54mmR	7.62mm Russian	
417/2(r)	Flzg. MG 417/2(r)		ShKAS	7.62	7.62×54mmR	7.62mm Russian	
418/1(r)	Flzg. MG 418/1(r)		DA-28	7.62	7.62×54mmR	7.62mm Russian	Right-hand charging handle.
418/2(r)	Flzg. MG 418/2(r)		DA-28	7.62	7.62×54mmR	7.62mm Russian	Left-hand charging handle.
		Flzg. MG 30(t)	ČZ-30	7.92	7.92×57mm	7.92mm Mauser	
		Fla. MG 39(t)	ZB-60	15	15×104mm	15mm Brno	

=== Rifle grenade launchers ===
Designation			Model/Year	Cal.^{(mm)}	Notes
Num.	Short	Alt.	Model/Year	Cal.^{(mm)}	Notes
792(e)	G.Gr.Ger. 792(e)		Cup Discharger No.1 Mk. I (Note: Called the Discharger Cup, 2.5-in., No.1, Mk. I in British Service.)	63.5	
793(e)	G.Gr.Ger. 793(e)		Cup Discharger No.2 Mk. I (Note: Called the Discharger Cup, 2.5-in., No.2, Mk. I in British Service.)	63.5	

=== Anti-tank weapons ===
Num.	Designation		Weapon Model	Cal.^{(mm)}	Notes
Num.	Short	Alt.	Weapon Model	Cal.^{(mm)}	Notes
770(p)	Pz.B 770(p)	Pz.B 35(p)	Kb ppanc wz. 35	7.92	Use 7.92×107mm DS cartridge.
775(r)	Pz.B 775(r)		PTR Sholokhov	12.7	Use 12.7×108mm cartridge. Described as a single-shot weapon.
776(r)	Pz.B 776(r)		PTR M1918?	12.7	Use 12.7×108mm cartridge. Described having an integral box magazine.
782(e)	Pz.B 782(e)		Boys Mk I	13.9	Use 13.9×99mmB (.55 Boys) cartridge.
783(r)	Pz.B 783(r)		PTRD-41	14.5	Use 14.5×114mm cartridge.
784(r)	Sl.Pz.B 784(r)		PTRS-41	14.5	Use 14.5×114mm cartridge.
788(a)	R.Pz.B 788(a)		M1 Bazooka	60	
789(e)	Pz.B 789(e)		PIAT Mk I	83	

== See also ==
- German designations of foreign artillery in World War II
- Specifications for World War II infantry weapons
- List of secondary and special-issue World War II infantry weapons
- Lists of World War II military equipment
- List of World War II weapons
- List of prototype World War II infantry weapons

=== List of firearms ===
- List of 7.62×54mmR firearms
- List of .30-06 Springfield firearms
- List of 7.92×57mm Mauser firearms
