= Specifications for World War II infantry weapons =

== Revolvers ==
Name	Nation	Calibre (mm)	Capacity	Muzzle velocity (m/s)	Barrel length (mm)	Overall length (mm)	Unloaded weight (kg)	Number produced
Enfield No. 2	United Kingdom	.38/200 (9×20mmR)	6	220	127	260	0.77	270,000
Webley Mk IV	United Kingdom	.38/200 (9×20mmR)	6	220	127	260	0.77	500,000
Webley Mk VI	United Kingdom	.455 Webley (11.55×19.3mmR)	6	200	155	285	1.1	125,000
Modèle 1892 revolver	France	8mm Lebel Revolver (8×27mmR)	6	213	114	238	0.83	350,000
Nagant M1895	Soviet Union	7.62×38mmR	7	271	114	230	0.75	2,000,000
Smith & Wesson M1917	United States	.45 ACP (11.43×23mm)	6	250	135	270	1.0	300,000
Smith & Wesson Victory	United States	.38/200 (9×20mmR)	6	220	127	260	0.75	6,000,000
Type 26	Japan	9×22mmR	6	229	120	230	0.93	up to 59,900

== Semi-automatic pistols ==
Name	Nation	Calibre	Capacity	Muzzle velocity (m/s)	Barrel length (mm)	Overall length (mm)	Unloaded weight (kg)	Number produced
Beretta M1934	Italy	9×17mm (.380 ACP)	7	250	94	152	0.69	1,080,000
Browning Hi-Power	Belgium	9×19mm Parabellum	13	350	120	200	0.82	1,000,000
Colt M1911A1	United States	.45 ACP (11.43×23mm)	7	253	125	216	1.05	2,700,000
Modèle 1935A	France	7.65×20mm Longue	8	345	105	188	0.79	84,950
Lahti L-35	Finland	9×19mm Parabellum	8	335	120	240	1.25	98,700
P-08 Luger	Germany	9×19mm Parabellum	8	320	102	230	0.85	412,898
Walther P38	Germany	9×19mm Parabellum	8	350	125	216	0.80	1,200,000
FÉG 37M Pistol	Hungary	9×17mm (.380 ACP)	7	300	110	182	0.77	300,000
TT-33	Soviet Union	7.62×25mm	8	420	115	195	0.83	1,700,000
Type 14 Nambu	Japan	8×22mm Nambu	8	290	117	230	0.90	280,000
FN Model 1910/22	Netherlands	9×17mm (.380 ACP)	8	300	113	178	0.70	467,760-704,247
FB Vis	Poland	9×19mm Parabellum	8	355	115	200	1.02	360,000

== Bolt-action rifles ==
Name	Nation	Calibre (mm)	Capacity	Muzzle velocity (m/s)	Barrel length (mm)	Overall length (mm)	Unloaded weight (kg)	Number produced
Berthier rifle	France	8×50mmR Lebel	5	700	803	1306	3.81	2,000,000
Carcano M91	Italy	6.5×52mm Carcano	6	700	780	1285	3.8	2-3,000,000
Karabin wz.98a	Poland	7.92×57mm Mauser	5	880	740	1150	4,36	44,500
Karabinek wz. 1929	Poland	7.92×57mm Mauser	5	745	600	1100	4,0	264,000
Type 24	China	7.92×57mm Mauser	5	810	600	1110	4,0	600,000
Lee–Enfield SMLE Mk III	United Kingdom	.303 British	10	745	640	1129	4.11	c.15,000,000 (all models)
Lee–Enfield No 4 Mk I	United Kingdom	.303 British	10	745	640	1129	4.11	c.15,000,000 (all models)
Lee–Enfield No 5 Mk I "jungle carbine"	United Kingdom	.303 British	10	745	521	1003	3.2	c.15,000,000 (all models)
MAS-36	France	7.5 mm French	5	700	575	1020	3.7	1,100,000
M1903 Springfield	United States	.30-06 Springfield	5	853	610	1140	3.94	3,000,000
M1894 Krag–Jørgensen	Norway	6.5×55mm Swedish	5	745	763	1263	4.00	150,817
Mauser Karabiner 98k	Germany	7.92×57mm Mauser	5	760	600	1110	3.9	14,643,260
Mosin–Nagant M1891/30	Soviet Union	7.62×54mmR	5	810	730	1235	4.2	c. 37,000,000 (all models)
Type 38 Arisaka	Japan	6.5×50mmSR Arisaka	5	765	797	1280	3.95	3,400,000
Type 99 Arisaka	Japan	7.7×58mm Arisaka	5	730	657	1120	3.8	2,500,000

== Semi-automatic rifles ==
Name	Nation	Calibre (mm)	Capacity	Muzzle velocity (m/s)	Barrel length (mm)	Overall length (mm)	Unloaded weight (kg)	Number produced
Gewehr 43	Germany	7.92×57mm Mauser	10	775	546	1130	4.27	500,000
Kbsp wz.38M	Poland	7.92×57mm Mauser	10	878	625	1134	4.50	~150
M1 Carbine	United States	.30 Carbine	15	585	458	904	2.48	6,000,000
M1 Garand	United States	.30-06 Springfield	8	853	610	1106	4.3	5,500,000
SVT-40	Soviet Union	7.62×54mmR	10	830	625	1226	3.89	1,300,000

== Submachine guns ==
Name	Nation	Calibre (mm)	Capacity	Rate of fire	Muzzle velocity (m/s)	Barrel length (mm)	Overall length (mm)	Unloaded weight (kg)	Number produced
Beretta 1938A	Italy	9x17mm	40	600	429	315	946	4.25	1,000,000
M1 Thompson	United States	.45 ACP	20	700	280	267	856	4.7	1,400,000
M3 "Grease Gun"	United States	.45 ACP	30	450	280	203	745	3.7	700,000
"Suomi" KP/31	Finland	9×19mm Parabellum	70	800	396	314	870	4.6	62,000
MAS-38	France	7.65×20mm Longue	32	600	350	224	623	3.01	2,000
Mors	Poland	9×19mm Parabellum	24	400	400	250/300	970	4.25	39
MP40	Germany	9×19mm Parabellum	32	500	380	251	833	3.97	1,000,000
Owen	Australia	9×19mm Parabellum	33	700	420	247	806	4.21	50,000
PPS-43	Soviet Union	7.62×25mm Tokarev	35	700	457	272	820	3.04	500,000
PPSh-41	Soviet Union	7.62×25mm Tokarev	71	900	457	265	828	3.64	5,000,000
Sten MK. II	United Kingdom	9×19mm Parabellum	32	550	365	197	762	3	2,000,000
Type 100	Japan	8×22mm Nambu	30	800	335	228	900	3.38	30,000

== Light machine guns ==
Name	Nation	Calibre (mm)	Capacity	Rate of fire	Muzzle velocity (m/s)	Barrel length (mm)	Overall length (mm)	Unloaded weight (kg)	Number produced
Breda 30	Italy	6.5×52mm Carcano	20	500	630	450	1230	10.6	30,000
Bren	United Kingdom	.303 British	30	500	730	635	1150	10.15	500,000
Browning wz.1928	Poland	7.92×57mm Mauser	20	650	853	611	1110	9.50	24,000
FM 24/29	France	7.5×54mm French	25	500	820	500	1082	9.80	232,942
Lewis Gun	United Kingdom	.303 British	47/97	550	700	800	1500	12	152,000
DP-27	Soviet Union	7.62×54mmR	47	550	830	610	1194	9.3	795,000
M1918A2 BAR	US	.30-06 Springfield	20	550	855	605	1290	8.33	250,000
Type 96 LMG	Japan	6.5×50mmSR Arisaka	30	550	735	552	1054	9.07	41,000
Type 99 LMG	Japan	7.7×58mm Arisaka	30	800	715	550	1181	10.4	53,000

== See also ==
- List of common World War II infantry weapons
- List of World War II firearms of Germany
- Table of handgun and rifle cartridges
- List of rifle cartridges
- List of handgun cartridges
