= Nagant =

Nagant may refer to:

- Fabrique d'armes Émile et Léon Nagant, defunct Belgian manufacturer of firearms and cars (1859-1931)
  - Mosin–Nagant, bolt-action infantry rifle
  - Nagant M1895, 7-shot gas-seal revolver
    - Nagant wz. 30, Polish-made derivative of the M1895 revolver
  - 7.62×38mmR, proprietary gas-seal ammunition designed for the M1895 revolver
  - 7.5mm 1882 Ordnance, 7.5mm cartridge designed for the Swiss military
- Lady Nagant, a character in the manga series My Hero Academia
