= Rast & Gasser M1898 =

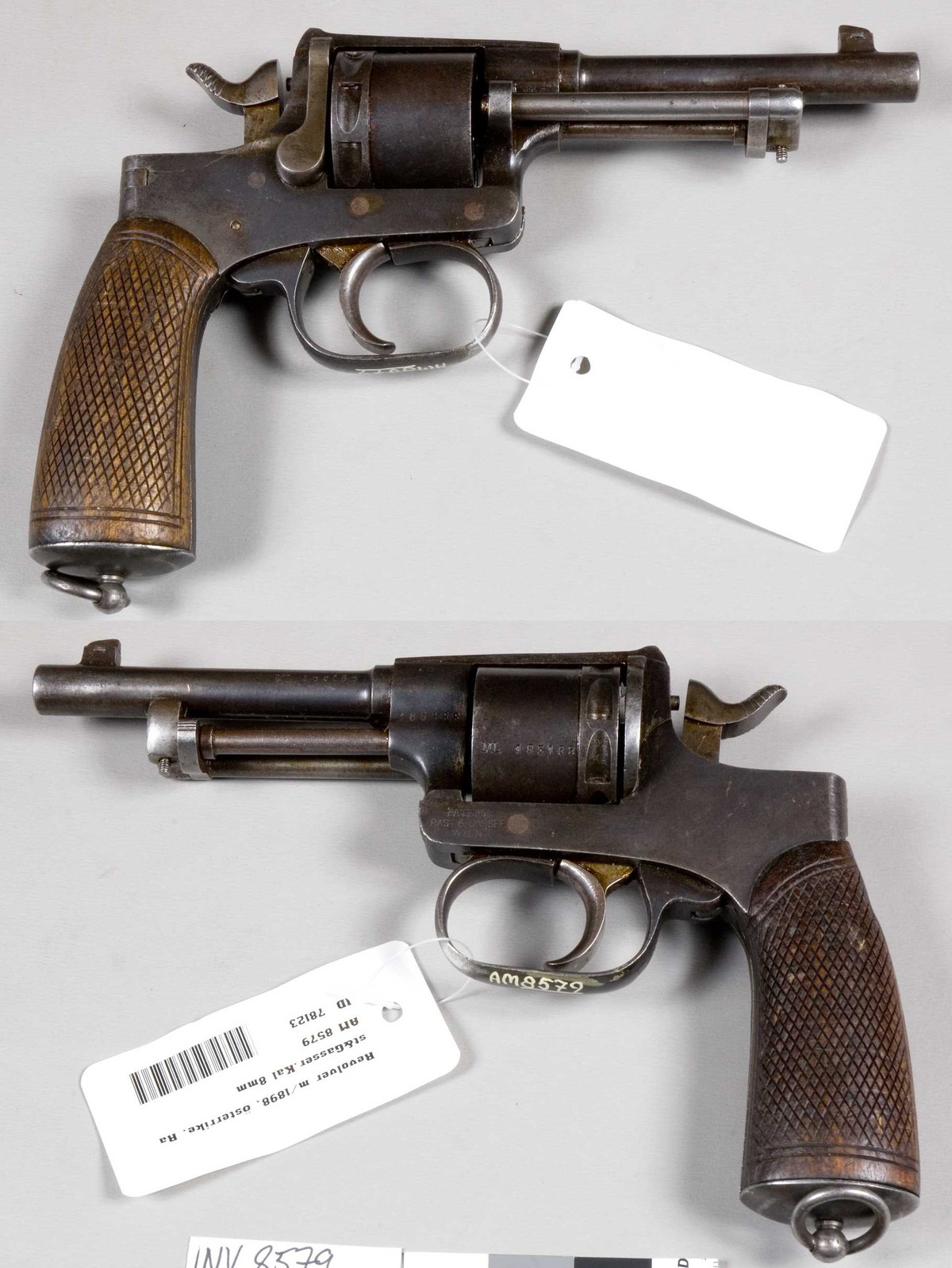
- Rast & Gasser M1898 revolver from the Swedish Army Museum
- Type: Revolver
- Place of origin: Austria-Hungary

Service history
- In service: 1898–1945
- Used by: Austria-Hungary; Kingdom of Italy; Kingdom of Yugoslavia; Czechoslovakia; First Austrian Republic; Kingdom of Hungary
- Wars: Boxer Rebellion; World War I Polish–Soviet War; Austrian Civil War; World War II

Production history
- Designer: August Rast
- Designed: 1898
- Manufacturer: Rast & Gasser
- Produced: 1898–1919
- No. built: Up to 250,000

Specifications
- Mass: 935 g (2.1 lb) unloaded
- Length: 223 mm (8.8 in)
- Barrel length: 116 mm (4.6 in)
- Cartridge: 8mm Gasser
- Action: Double-action revolver
- Muzzle velocity: 240 m/s (787.4 ft/s)
- Feed system: 8-round cylinder
- Sights: Rear V-notch and front post

The Rast & Gasser M1898 was an Austro-Hungarian double-action revolver manufactured by the Austrian firm Rast & Gasser. It was adopted by the Austro-Hungarian Army in 1898 and remained in military service until the dissolution of Austria-Hungary in 1918. The revolver was chambered for the 8mm Gasser cartridge and saw service during World War I.

The M1898 featured a solid-frame construction and an eight-round cylinder. Its design emphasized durability and continued military use, and examples remained in circulation after the end of the Austro-Hungarian Empire. The revolver was subsequently used by military and security forces in several successor states and other countries during the 20th century.

== History ==
The M1898 was designed to replace the Gasser M1870 revolver, which had been in service since the 1870s. The Rast & Gasser revolver introduced several improvements, including a double-action mechanism, which allowed for faster and more efficient use in combat. The revolver used an 8-round cylinder, which was one of the distinguishing features compared to other revolvers of the time, most of which held six rounds.

This model was adopted by the Austro-Hungarian Army in 1898 and saw widespread use during World War I. Although it was a solid and reliable weapon, it was eventually replaced by semi-automatic pistols after the war.

180,000 copies were produced by the firm Leopold Gasser Waffenfabrik in Vienna from 1898 to 1912. Prior to the outbreak of the First World War, the M1898 was planned to be replaced in the Austro-Hungarian cavalry with the Roth–Steyr M1907, and in the infantry with the Steyr M1912. However, production of newer pistols was insufficient, and the weapon remained in service. It was specially issued to NCOs, officers, and also as a secondary weapon for machine-gunners. In some armies it was used up through the Second World War, including Italy and Yugoslavia. The manufacturing quality and the strength of the solid-frame design made it a reliable and consistent military weapon.

The M1898 was copied in Belgium by Manufacture d'Armes Liégeoise in the 7.62 Nagant caliber.

== Operation ==
The Rast & Gassers featured some new elements of revolver design, as well as older elements already obsolete at the time of its manufacture. A solid-frame double-action revolver, it had a loading-gate through which individual cartridges were loaded and extracted by an extractor rod. The firing pin was located on a transfer piece on the frame of the revolver rather than the hammer, an advancement at the time. Its ammunition was similar to but not interchangeable with that of the 8mm French Ordnance.

The cylinder could be removed by pulling down on a spring loaded screw and withdrawing the axis pin/ejector rod.

== Loading ==
To load the M1898 the user must rotate the loading gate back, exposing the rear of the cylinder. Doing this disengages the hammer from the trigger, but the cylinder will still rotate if the trigger is squeezed. This feature makes loading much easier and faster. Cartridges are then inserted into the cylinder and the trigger squeezed to present the next empty chamber. After all the slots have been loaded, the loading-gate is closed by pushing it forward. The hammer is then rotated all the way back to the full-cocked position ready for firing.

To unload the M1898, the loading gate is rotated backwards to expose the back of the cylinder. The user then rotates the knurled handle of the ejector rod outwards, which can then be pushed backwards to punch out the spent case from each cylinder chamber.

To remove the cylinder, the user must remove the cylinder arbor by pulling down on a spring loaded screw which nestles into a mortice on the barrel. While holding the screw down, the user can then simply pull the arbor forwards till it slips off of the frame. Then one must open the loading gate to allow the cylinder to fall out the right side of the frame.

== Legacy ==
The Rast & Gasser M1898 is considered one of the last major military revolvers used by Austria-Hungary. Today, it is of interest to collectors and historical firearms enthusiasts, particularly due to its role in World War I and its unique 8-round cylinder design.

== Other specifications ==
- Rifling: 4-groove right-hand twist

== Sources ==
- D. VENNER, Le Grand Livre des Armes, J. Grancher, 1979
- COLLECTIF (spécialistes tchèques), Encyclopédie illustrée des Armes des 1ère et 2e Guerres mondiales, Gründ, 2001
