= Mauser Model 1910 =

- Type: Bolt-action rifle
- Place of origin: German Empire

Service history
- In service: 1910–1945
- Used by: See Users
- Wars: Balkan Wars; World War I; World War II

Production history
- Designed: 1910
- Manufacturer: Mauser
- Produced: 1911–1914

Specifications
- Mass: 4.0 kg (8.8 lb)
- Length: 124 cm (48.8 in)
- Barrel length: 74.0 cm (29.13 in)
- Cartridge: 7×57mm Mauser
- Action: Bolt-action
- Feed system: 5-round stripper clip, internal magazine
- Sights: Iron sights adjustable to 2,000 metres (2,200 yd)

The Mauser Model 1910 was a Mauser bolt-action rifle, derived from the Gewehr 98. It was designed for export market.

== Design ==
The Model 1910 was based on the Gewehr 98. The bayonet of the Mauser Model 1895 could be fitted on it. It used the standard tangent leaf rear sight. The Model 1910 features a rarely-used Mauser invention, patented in 1898: the bolt head enveloped the cartridge rim, leaving only the cartridge case visible. It made the rifle more complex.

== Service ==
Costa Rica ordered the Model 1910, chambered in 7×57mm Mauser. 5,000 were produced by the Mauser Oberndorf plant (Waffenfabrik Mauser-Oberndorf a/n) between 1911 and 1913. Some of these rifles had their barrel shortened to 58 centimetres (23 in) and were later modified to fire the .30-06 Springfield cartridge. Ecuador ordered an unknown number in the same caliber.

Serbia ordered the Model 1910 rifle, chambered in 7×57mm Mauser. It saw service during the Balkan Wars and World War I. In 1918, it was the standard rifle of the Kingdom of Serbs, Croats and Slovenes (Yugoslavia). Some were exported to Guatemala. In Yugoslavian service, the rifle was called Puška 7 mm M 10 and saw further service during World War II. Some were shortened and rechambered in 7.92×57mm Mauser as Puška 7,9 mm M 10C. The German captured by Nazi Germany were respectively designated Gewehr 221 (j) and Gewehr 291/3 (j).

The Venezuelan unelected leader, Juan Vicente Gómez, ordered 6,000 Model 1910 to modernize its Army equipment. They were delivered by Mauser before 1914.

== Users ==
- Costa Rica
- Ecuador
- Guatemala
- Nazi Germany
- Serbia
  - Yugoslavia
- Venezuela
