= Nagant wz. 30 =

Polish revolver

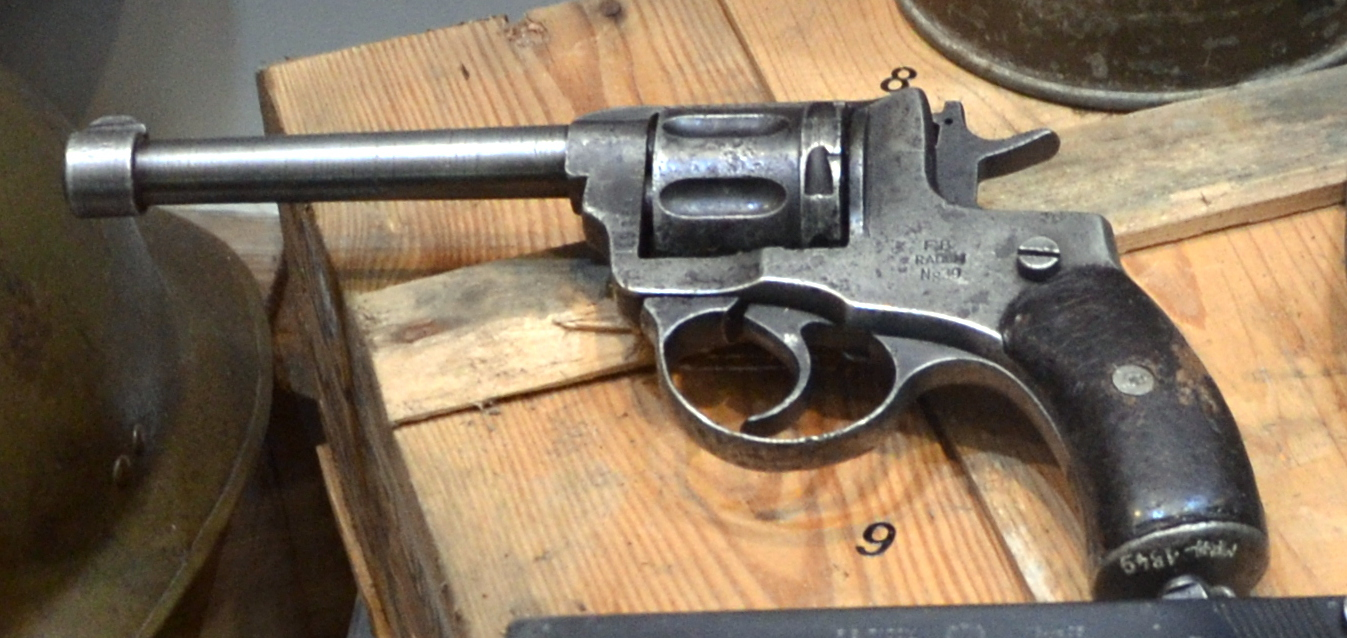

Rewolwer Nagant wz. 30 and wz. 32 were two Polish derivatives of the Nagant M1895 revolver. They were almost identical to the Soviet variants with only minor differences in weight, length and sights design.

The Nagant M1895 was mass-produced in Imperial Russia and the Soviet Union as a standard side-arm of officers and NCOs. After Poland regained independence in 1918, the Polish Army inherited some captured revolvers and pressed them into Polish service as the rewolwer wz. 1895 Nagant - Mark 1895 revolver. After the Polish-Bolshevik War the army decided to focus on the 7.92 mm calibre and the Nagant revolvers were withdrawn from active service.

The Nagant revolver remained in service with the State Police, along with a large variety of sidearms of all types and calibres. The Police used also Modèle 1892 revolver and Rast & Gasser M1898 revolvers as well as a number of pistol designs: Mauser M1910, Mauser C96, Beretta M1923, various Browning pistols (wz. 1900, wz. 1910 and wz. 1922), Ortgies Semi-Automatic Pistol, Cebra wz. 1916, Frommer wz. 1910, Steyr M1912, Roth–Steyr M1907 and Parabellum P08.

In September 1927 the Police Headquarters started a poll among police officers to determine which firearm should be used as a standard sidearm throughout the police force, and the Nagant system was chosen for its durability and simplicity. As the number of Russian ex-military weapons was limited, in 1930 the state-owned Fabryka Broni works in Radom developed a slightly modified variant, designated "Nagant wz. 30". Comparing to the Russian or Belgian models, the new Polish model was slightly lighter, and the barrel was slightly shorter. In 1932 the design was further modified by the relocation of the sight (and giving a new "Rewolwer wz. 32" designation). Between 1929 and 1935 the Radom works produced 7,166 revolvers of both variants.

Both the original M1895 Nagant and its later clones remained the standard police weapon used by the State Police and Postal Guards throughout the 1930s, though with time they were often replaced with more modern designs like the Beretta M1934 and Walther PPK. They were also widely used by mobilised policemen during the German and Soviet invasion of Poland of 1939.
