= 8mm French Ordnance =

Revolver cartridge

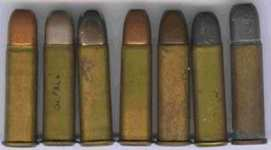
- Various loadings of the cartridge.
- Type: Pistol
- Place of origin: France

Service history
- In service: 1892–1960s
- Used by: France
- Wars: World War I

Specifications
- Case type: rimmed, straight
- Bullet diameter: 8.35 mm (0.329 in)
- Neck diameter: 8.83 mm (0.348 in)
- Base diameter: 8.96 mm (0.353 in)
- Rim diameter: 10.43 mm (0.411 in)
- Rim thickness: 1.35 mm (0.053 in)
- Case length: 27.5 mm (1.08 in)
- Overall length: 36.7 mm (1.44 in)
- Filling: 0.79 g (12.2 gr) of black powder, later 0.3 g (4.6 gr) of Poudre B

Ballistic performance
Bullet mass/type	Velocity	Energy
7.8 g (120 gr)	225 m/s (740 ft/s)	196 J (145 ft⋅lbf)

The 8mm French Ordnance (8×27mmR), officially designated as 8 mm Lebel by the C.I.P., is a rimmed cartridge used in the 8mm M1892 revolver and inexpensive handguns manufactured in Belgium and Spain. These are usually copies of the Modèle d'Ordonnance revolver itself or of then reputable foreign firearms (Colt Police Positive, Nagant M1895, Rast & Gasser M1898 or S&W Model 10).

== Synonyms ==
- 8 mm Lebel (Official C.I.P. designation)
- [8,3 x 27,5 mm R Lebel]
- 8 mm Lebel Revolver M92
- 8 mm Revolver réglementaire français M.1892 (Revolver réglementaire français > "Standard French Revolver")
- 8 mm French Revolver M1892
- 8 mm Revolver M.1892
