= Fabrique d'armes Émile et Léon Nagant =

Belgian manufacturer of firearms and later cars

- Company type: Private
- Industry: firearms, vehicles
- Founded: 1859 in Liège, Belgium
- Founder: Émile Nagant; Léon Nagant
- Defunct: 1931
- Fate: Acquired
- Headquarters: Liège, Belgium
- Area served: Worldwide
- Products: firearms, automobiles
- Parent: Impéria Automobiles
- Footnotes / references Major contributors to the design of the Mosin–Nagant service rifle by Russia and then by the USSR

The Fabrique d'armes Émile et Léon Nagant, later known as L. Nagant & Cie, Liège, was a Belgian firm established in Liège in 1859 as a manufacturer of firearms and later automobiles.

== History ==
The company was originally founded by brothers Émile (1830–1902) and Léon (1833–1900) as an industrial repair business, which included repairing damaged firearms. In 1867, the Nagant brothers entered the firearms market when their company received a license to produce 5,000 Remington Rolling Block rifles for the Papal Zouaves; they later adapted the rolling-block design to produce double-barreled shotguns under the name "Remington-Nagant".

The company is best known for Émile's contribution to the design of the Mosin–Nagant Russian service rifle, adopted in 1891. This introduction to the Tsar's military administration led to the adoption, in 1895, of the Nagant M1895 revolver (designed by Léon) as their standard-issue sidearm. The following year, Émile's progressive blindness led to his retirement from the firm which was renamed to "L. Nagant & Cie, Liège", with Léon being joined by his sons Charles and Maurice.

The company was liquidated in 1928, and the arms manufacturing line was sold to Fabryka Broni Radom. The industrial buildings were then bought by FN Herstal in 1929 and subsequently sold to the Belgian army.

== Car manufacture ==
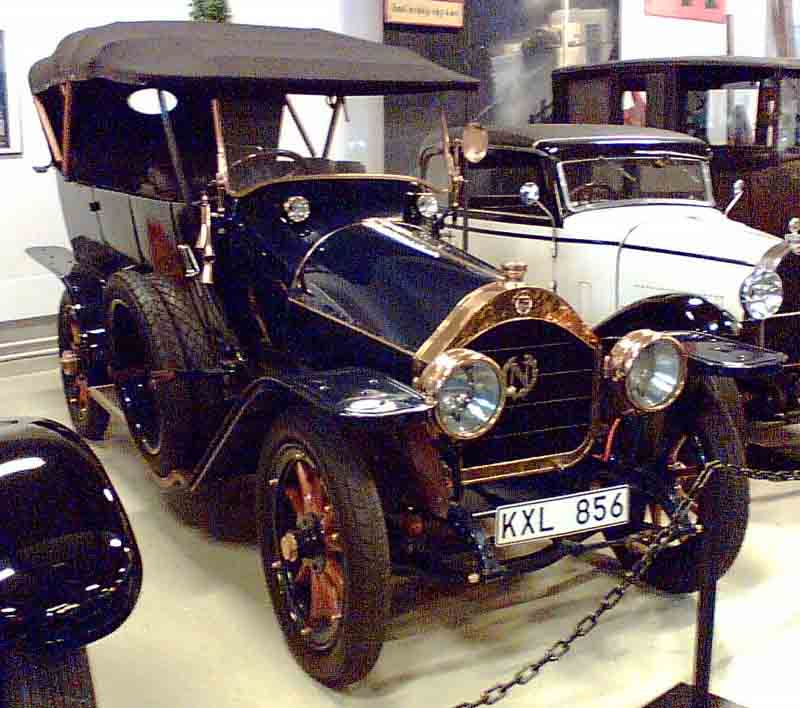
Nagant Phaeton 1910

Later, the firm moved to the manufacture of automobiles; Nagant began with building cars under licence of the French firm Gobron-Brillies and later Rochet-Schneider. Nagant cars were made from 1900 to 1928. Overhead-valve engines appeared after World War I, at which point the company was making around 200 cars per year. The firm was purchased by Impéria Automobiles in 1931.
