= FÉG 37M Pistol =

Frommer 37.M Pisztoly
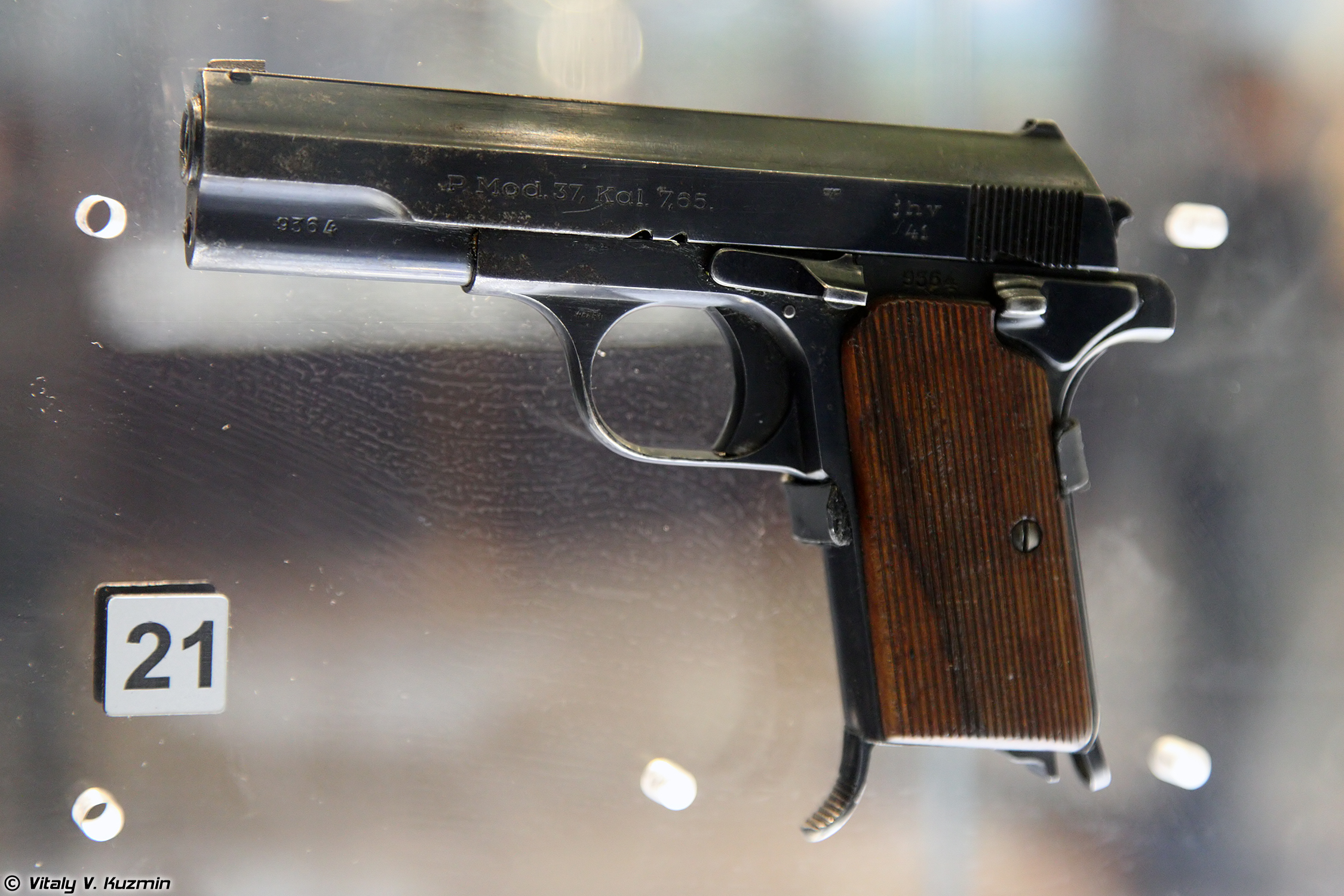
- Type: Semi-automatic pistol
- Place of origin: Hungary

Service history
- In service: Approximately 20 years some postwar police
- Used by: Nazi Germany, Hungary
- Wars: Slovak-Hungarian War; World War II; Hungarian Revolution of 1956

Production history
- Designer: Rudolf Frommer
- Designed: 1936
- Manufacturer: Fémáru, Fegyver és Gépgyár (FÉG)
- Produced: 1937–1944
- No. built: 250,000
- Variants: 3

Specifications
- Mass: 770g (27.7 oz)
- Length: 182 mm (7.17 in)
- Cartridge: .380 ACP, .32 ACP
- Caliber: .32, .38
- Action: blowback operated automatic pistol
- Muzzle velocity: 984 ft/s (300 m/s)
- Feed system: 7 rounds
- Sights: Fixed, iron

The FÉG 37M is a Hungarian semi-automatic pistol based on a design by Rudolf Frommer.

== Design ==
It was an improvement over the earlier Frommer 29M. It was made in 2 chamberings. The .380 ACP (9x17mmSR) chambered version was used by the Hungarian Army, while the .32 ACP (7.65x17mmSR) version was supplied to Hungary's German allies during World War II. The former, was known in Hungarian service as the M1937.

The latter, in German service during World War II, was known as Pistole 37(u), pistole M 37 Kal. 7,65 mm or P37. The main difference between this and the other variants is that the "German" version had a manual safety (which the Hungarian issue did not have) and was marked "Pistole M 37 Kal. 7.65" and the FEG code "jhv" and date, along with the Waffenamt markings. Though it was produced under more strain due to the rate by which they wanted them produced, it was still a reliable pistol. 150 - 300,000 pistols were completed this way. Some partially finished post war models were also issued, and there was an attempt to produce the gun after the war, but without success.

== See also ==
- Weapons employed in the Slovak-Hungarian War
