= Nagant M1895 =

Revolver used in the Russian Empire

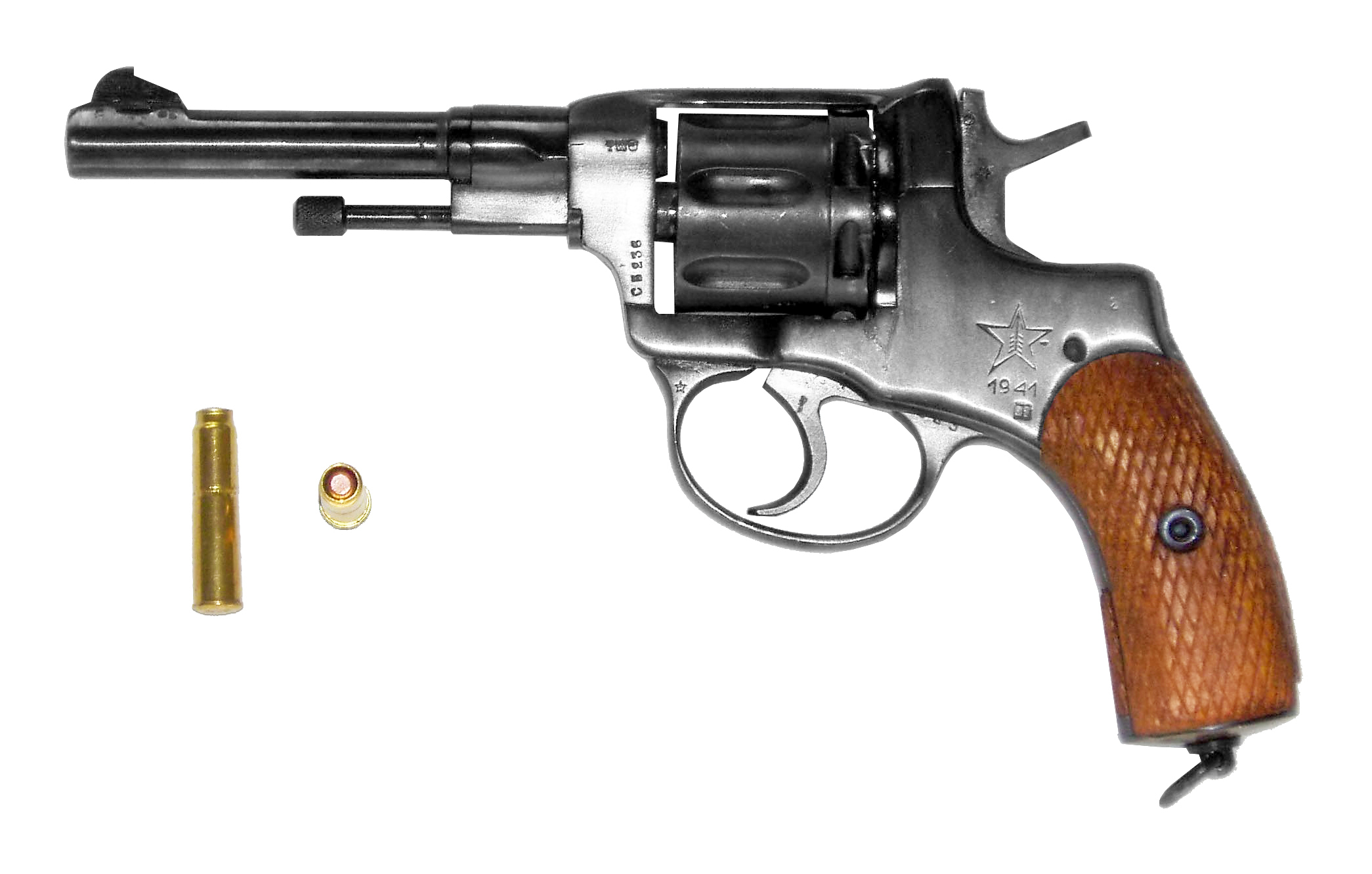
- A Nagant M1895 produced in 1941 by the Tula Arsenal with its 7.62×38mmR ammunition
- Type: Revolver
- Place of origin: Belgium and Russia

Service history
- In service: 1895–present
- Used by: See Users
- Wars: Boxer Rebellion; Russo-Japanese War; World War I Russian Revolution of 1917; Russian Civil War; Finnish Civil War; Estonian War of Independence; Polish-Soviet War; Spanish Civil War; Winter War; World War II; Chinese Civil War; Hukbalahap Rebellion; Korean War; Vietnam War; Tuareg rebellion (1990–1995)

Production history
- Designer: Léon Nagant
- Designed: 1886
- Manufacturer: Nagant, Soviet Arsenals (Tula & Izhevsk), Państwowa Fabryka Karabinów
- Produced: 1895–1945
- No. built: ~2,000,000
- Variants: See Variants

Specifications
- Mass: 1.8 lb (0.8 kg), unloaded
- Length: 10.5 in (235 mm)
- Barrel length: 4.5 in (114 mm)
- Cartridge: 7.62×38mmR.32 ACP (aftermarket cylinder)
- Action: Double action, Single-action
- Rate of fire: 14–21 rounds/min
- Muzzle velocity: 335 m/s (1,099.08 ft/s)
- Effective firing range: 46 m (50.31 yd)
- Feed system: 7-round cylinder
- Sights: Fixed front post and rear notch

The Nagant M1895 is a seven-shot, gas-seal revolver designed and produced by Belgian industrialist Léon Nagant for the Russian Empire.

The Nagant M1895 was chambered for a proprietary cartridge, 7.62×38mmR, and features a gas-seal system, in which the cylinder moves forward when the gun is cocked, to close the gap between the cylinder and the barrel, providing a boost to the muzzle velocity of the bullet and allowing the weapon to be suppressed.

== History ==
The Nagant was designed by Léon Nagant, whose brother Émile had also taken part in designing the Mosin–Nagant rifle. The Nagant M1895 was adopted as the standard issue sidearm for the Imperial Russian Army and police officers, where it replaced earlier Smith & Wesson models such as the Model 3.

Production began in Liège, Belgium; however Russian Empire purchased the manufacturing rights in 1898, and moved production to the Tula Arsenal in Russia, and was soon producing 20,000 examples per year.

It was produced in two versions: a double-action version for officers, and a cheaper single-action version for the lower ranks. After the Russian Revolution, only the double-action version was made.

Since 1923, the revolver had been a weapon for sport shooting in the USSR. In September 1923, the first USSR championship in sport shooting was held in Novogireyevo in Moscow oblast. One of the competitions involved shooting with standard army revolvers at targets at a distance of 50 meters. Later, several sports versions of this revolver were created for sporting competitions (5.6mm Nagant Model 1926, Nagant Model 1953, MTs-4, TOZ-36 and TOZ-49).

Nagant revolvers were used by the NKVD and Red Army units until the end of World War II, with a total of 2,000,000 produced. The Nagant began to be replaced by the Tokarev semi-automatic pistol in 1933, and was formally replaced by the Makarov in 1952, though Nagant revolvers continued to see limited use in the Korean War and Vietnam War.

== Technical characteristics ==
The M1895 has a mechanism which, as the hammer is cocked, first turns the cylinder and then moves it forward, closing the gap between the cylinder and the barrel. The cartridge, also unique, plays an important part in sealing the gun to prevent the escape of propellant gases. The bullet is deeply seated, entirely within the cartridge case, and the case is slightly reduced in diameter at its mouth. The barrel features a short conical section at its rear; this accepts the mouth of the cartridge, completing the gas seal. By sealing the gap, the velocity of the bullet is increased by 15 to 45 m/s (50 to 150 ft/s.) This feature also eliminates the possibility of injury from gases escaping through the gap, which can injure a finger if the user holds the gun with a finger positioned beside the gap. The Nagant's sealed firing system meant that the Nagant revolver, unlike most other revolvers, made effective use of a sound suppressor, and suppressors were sometimes fitted to it.

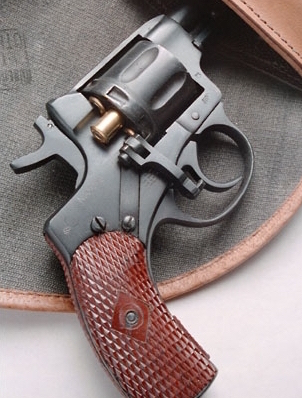
Holstered Nagant with the gate open for loading.

The disadvantage of this design is that Nagant revolvers were laborious and time-consuming to reload, with the need to manually eject each of the used cartridges, and reload one cartridge at a time through a loading gate. At the time the revolver was designed, this system was obsolete. In British service the Webley Revolver used a top-break cylinder and star extractor to simultaneously eject all spent cartridges and, in American service, the Smith & Wesson Model 10 employed a similar system but with a swing-out cylinder. The Nagant, with its side-loading gate and ejector rod to remove spent cartridges individually in succession was for all its novelty, outdated as a military revolver in this regard. However, the Nagant design did have the advantage of requiring less machining than more modern formats.

The Nagant M1895 has a heavy trigger pull (about 12 lbs for single and 20 lbs for double).

== Cartridges ==
=== Russian ===
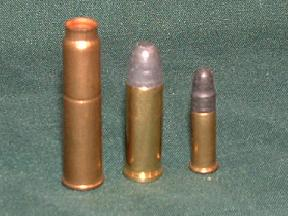
7.62×38mmR (7.62 mm Nagant) cartridge, left, shown next to a .32 S&W Long Cartridge (middle) and a .22 LR cartridge (right) for comparison.

7.62mm Nagant is also known as 7.62×38mmR (Rimmed) or "Cartridge, Type R". The projectile is seated below the mouth of the cartridge, with the cartridge crimp sitting just above the bullet. When fired, the crimp expands into the forcing cone, completing the gas seal and ostensibly increasing muzzle velocity by approximately 75 ft/s.

Aftermarket cylinders for .32-caliber can be installed, allowing the Nagant to safely fire .32 H&R Magnum or .32 ACP. Shooting any ammunition other than the 7.62×38mmR cartridge with the original cylinder can cause bodily injury from bullet shrapnel or escaping gas, and the excessive pressures produced by some .32 ammunition could also cause catastrophic failure of the cylinder or frame.

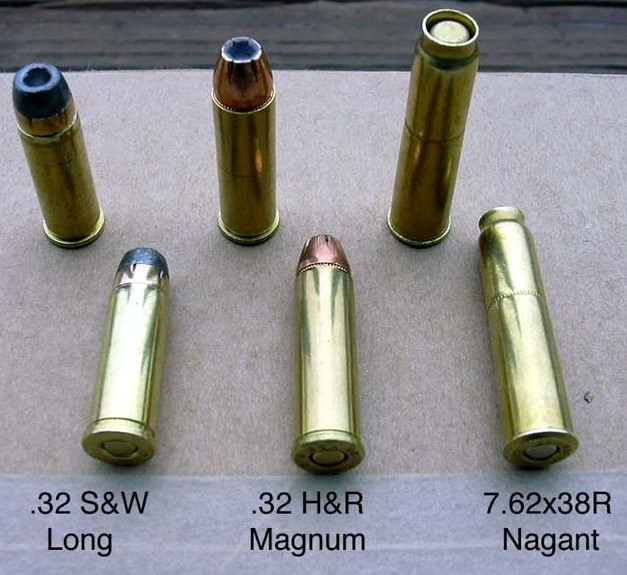
Comparison of .32 Smith & Wesson Long, .32 H&R Magnum and 7.62×38mmR Nagant

Proper fitting ammunition can be reloaded from .32-20 Winchester brass by using the Lee Nagant die set or .30" carbine dies and 9mm Luger shell-holders in the reloading press. This allows the reloaders to work up a load that fits their needs and is specific for the Nagant. While this eliminates the bulged/split/stuck cases experienced when using .32 S&W and .32 H&R, the gas seal that made the Nagant famous will still not fully function as the .32-20 is not long enough to protrude past the cylinder like the original Nagant ammunition.

=== 7.5x22mmR Nagant ===
The Luxembourgish, Swedish, and Norwegian Nagants used a different cartridge, the 7.5 mm Nagant. This ammunition is dimensionally similar but not interchangeable with the 7.5mm 1882 Ordnance (aka Swiss 7.5mm revolver). They lack the gas-seal lock of the Belgian and Russian models.

=== 9.4x22mmR Nagant ===
The black powder cartridge used in Nagant's original gas-sealed revolver design.
Year of introduction: 1878.
Bullet Diameter: 9.25 – 9.30mm (.364 - .374"). Round-nosed lead bullet with paper patch.
Bullet Weight: 11.95-12.3 grams
Case diameters,
Neck: 9.90 – 10.20mm (.389 - .401" inch)
Head: 10.75 – 10.90mm (.423 - .429" inch)
Rim: 12.00 – 12.35mm (.472 - .486" inch)
Berdan primer
Cartridge overall length 33.30 – 34.50mm (1.311 – 1.358 inches)
Cartridge weight 11.95 – 12.30gm (184.41 - 189.81 grains)

== Variants ==
=== Russia ===
==== Military ====
- Nagant "Private's model" («солдатский» наган) - a single-action version for non-commissioned officers and soldiers
- Nagant "Officer’s model" («офицерский» наган) - a double-action version for officers
- suppressed Nagant with sound suppressor known as the "BRAMIT device" (BRAtya MITiny - "Mitin Brothers") - produced since 1931 for Soviet reconnaissance and scout troops

==== Civilian ====
- TOZ-36 (ТОЗ-36) - since 1962
- TOZ-49 (ТОЗ-49)
- KR-22 «Sokol» (КР-22 «Сокол») - .22 LR
- Nagant 1910 - An improved version with a swing-out cylinder. It was never accepted into service and had poor civilian market sales.
- "Shadow-7" ("Тень-7") - Carbine variant with a 450mm barrel, produced in 2020 by Russian company Test-Oruzhie, chambered for 5.45×18mm.

=== Belgium ===
Nagant M1878 Belgian Officer's Revolver [9.4mm Nagant] - Single Action / Double Action trigger. 6-shot cylinder.
Nagant M1883 Belgian Infantry Revolver [9.4mm Nagant] - Simplified Single Action Only trigger version. 6-shot cylinder.
Nagant M1886 Belgian Officer's Revolver [9.4mm Nagant] - Simplified Double Action Only trigger version. 6-shot cylinder.

=== Luxembourg ===
In the 1880s, Luxembourg purchased a total of 190 Nagant revolvers, with the standard model chambered in 7.5mm, and the Gendarmerie receiving a black powder 9.4x22mm variant which could also affix a spike bayonet.

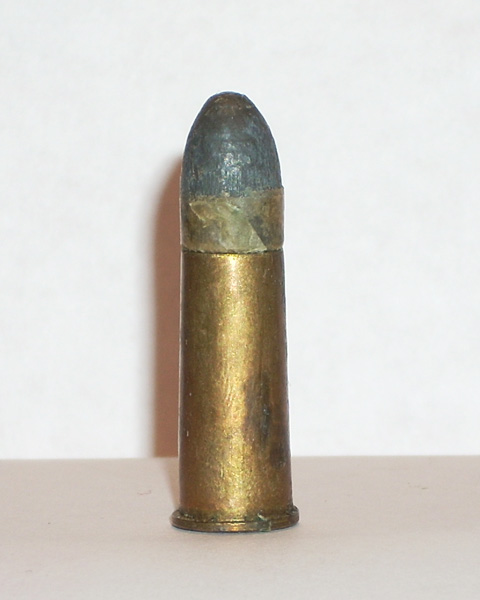
7.5 mm Swedish/ Norwegian Nagant round

=== Norway ===
Designated the M1893, and based on the Swedish M1887.

=== Poland ===
Poland designed approximately 21,000 Nagant wz. 30 revolvers for police use from 1928 to 1939.

=== Serbia ===
Purchased 12,000 7.5mm Nagants from Belgium in the 1880s.

=== Sweden ===
Chambered in 7.5mm, the Swedish M1887 notably does not have the same gas-sealing feature of the Belgian or Russian Nagants.

=== Finland ===
The standard 1895 Nagant revolver had been used in the Grand Duchy of Finland since World War I and the Finnish Civil War by both the Red Guards and White Guard. The Republic of Finland captured a large number of Nagant revolvers during both the Winter War and later the Continuation War as war loot. By March of 1941 only 328 Nagant revolvers existed within the Finnish arsenals. Although an unofficial service weapon of the Finnish Defence Forces, some 1,400 Nagant revolvers continued to be circulated in the Finnish military well into 1951.

== Users ==
- Belarus: Officially retired from service in December 2005. Used as a training weapon.
- Belgium
- China: Used by the People's Volunteer Army during the Korean War.
- Czechoslovakia: In use after independence.
- Greece: Περίστροφον M1895.
- East Germany
- Finland: Used heavily in the Finnish Civil War by both the Red Guards and White Guard. Many Nagants were captured during both the Winter War and later the Continuation War as war loot. Although an unofficial service weapon, some 1,400 Nagant revolvers continued to be circulated in the Finnish military well into 1951.
- Georgia
- Kazakhstan: Used by security guards as late as 1996
- Yugoslavia
- Laos
- Mali: People's Movement for the Liberation of Azawad
- Mongolia: Mongolian People's Army
- North Korea: Mostly provided to officers and armored vehicle operators during the Korean War.
- Norway
- Poland
- Russia: Remains in limited service; used by some law enforcement units until 1998; by postal service security guards until 2003; and by the Ministry of Internal Affairs until 2006
- Russian Empire: Adopted on 13 May 1895
- Kingdom of Serbia
- Socialist Federal Republic of Yugoslavia
- Soviet Union
- Spanish Republic
- Sweden
- Ukraine: Used by railway security guards and industrial security guards as late as to 2017

== See also ==
- List of Russian weaponry
- Modèle 1892 revolver
