= 7.62×38mmR =

Russian revolver cartridge

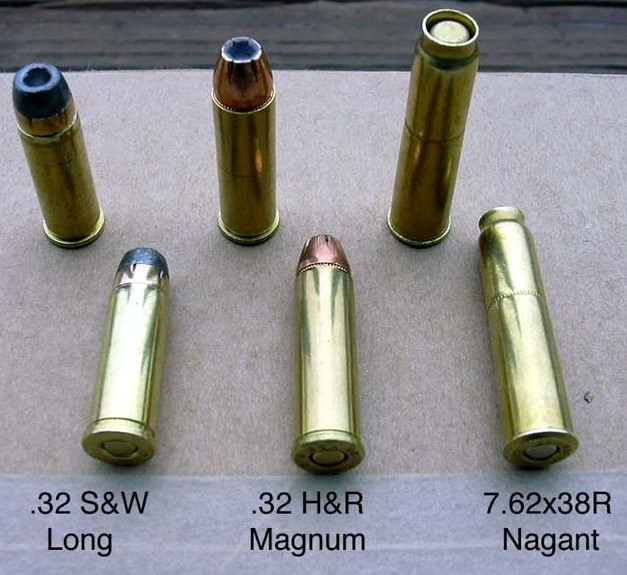
- Commercial production 7.62×38mmR (right) in comparison with .32 Smith & Wesson Long and .32 H&R Magnum
- Type: Revolver
- Place of origin: Belgium; Russian Empire

Service history
- In service: 1895–present
- Used by: see users
- Wars: Russo-Japanese War; World War I Russian Civil War; World War II; Post 1945 conflicts

Production history
- Designer: Léon Nagant
- Designed: 1895

Specifications
- Case type: Rimmed
- Bullet diameter: 7.82 (.308)
- Neck diameter: 7.26 mm (0.286 in)
- Shoulder diameter: 8.38 mm (0.330 in)
- Base diameter: 8.94 mm (0.352 in)
- Rim diameter: 9.855 mm (0.3880 in)
- Case length: 38.86 mm (1.530 in)
- Overall length: 38.86 mm (1.530 in)
- Primer type: Berdan or boxer small pistol

Ballistic performance
Bullet mass/type	Velocity	Energy
7 g (108 gr) FMJ	305 m/s (1,000 ft/s)	325 J (240 ft⋅lbf)
6.35 g (98 gr) FMJ	225 m/s (740 ft/s)	160 J (120 ft⋅lbf)
- Test barrel length: 114 mm (4.5 in); Source

7.62×38mmR (also known as 7.62 mm Nagant and Cartridge, Type R) is an ammunition cartridge designed for use in the Russian Nagant M1895 revolver.

A small number of experimental submachine guns (e.g., Tokarev 1927), designed by Fedor Tokarev, were also produced in a 7.62 mm Nagant chambering. None, however, were accepted into Soviet service.

== Background ==
Designed by Léon Nagant in 1894 for his gas-seal revolver, and adopted the next year by the Russians to replace the .44 S&W Russian cartridge, the 7.62×38R cartridge mouth expands when fired, forming a gas seal to improve muzzle velocity by preventing gas leaks from the gaps between the barrel and cylinder.

Reportedly, Tsar Nicholas II took an interest in the 7.62×38R cartridge as he felt that a cartridge loaded with smokeless powder would make soldiers firing positions less conspicuous than the old black powder .44 S&W Russian cartridge.

== Description ==
The cartridge uses a 108 gr (7.0 g) Full Metal Jacketed (FMJ) bullet seated below the mouth of the cartridge case which is crimped above the bullet. The case is rimmed and the mouth of the cartridge is designed to enter the rear end of the barrel. According to Ness and Williams, the shape of the cartridge mouth varies between manufacturers. Russian military loads had a lead core and a nickel jacket.

The Nagant 1895 revolver gas seal involves moving the cylinder forwards, so that the chamber about to be fired enclosed the rear part of the barrel and the mouth of the cartridge actually entered the barrel. Upon firing, the mouth of the cartridge expands to form a 'forcing cone' completing the gas seal. According to Hogg, the gas seal provides an estimated 15 metres per second (50 ft/s), while the Shooting Illustrated magazine estimated an increase of 21 m/s (70 ft/s).

The 7.62×38mmR bullet performs relatively well for a .30 caliber round. Fired from the M1895 114.5 mm (4.51 in) barrel, the bullet can penetrate 20 cm (7.9 in) of white pine boards at a 20 m (66 ft) distance. In comparison to the .44 S&W Russian, the 7.62×38mmR is lighter, with greater speed and penetration but less stopping power.

Cartridge performance largely varies between sources: According to Hogg, the M1895 fired a 108-grain bullet at 305 m/s (1,000 ft/s), giving a muzzle energy of 325 Joules (240 ft/lb). Ness and Williams give the following figures: a 108-grain bullet propelled at 285 m/s (940 ft/s), giving a muzzle energy of 284 J. Thompson mentions that some sources give a muzzle velocity of 271 m/s (890 ft/s) while others give a muzzle velocity of 327 m/s (1,070 ft/s); Reportedly, Pieper produced loads that propelled a 108-grain FMJ bullet at 221 m/s (730 ft/s) while Russian military loads had more propellant, driving the 108-grain FMJ bullet at 336 m/s (1,100 ft/s).

Modern loadings from Fiocchi have a muzzle velocity of 229 m/s (750 ft/s), allowing its use in older revolvers. According to Ness and Williams, Fiocchi loadings propel a 97-grain jacketed cylindro-conoidal bullet at 300 m/s (980 ft/s). Prvi Partizan loadings have a 98-grain bullet and a muzzle velocity of 225 m/s (740 ft/s), giving an energy of 160 J.

As of 2006, large numbers of M1895 revolvers remained in reserve or in paramilitary hands, while some gas-seal target revolvers are still manufactured by Russia and the Czech Republic. Thousands of Soviet revolvers and millions of rounds of ammunition were exported from former Warsaw Pact countries to the United States during the early 2000s.

== Handloading ==
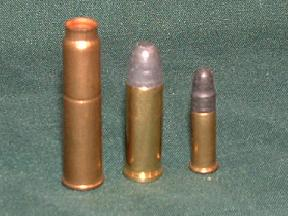
7.62×38R (7.62 Nagant) cartridge (left) next to a .32 S&W Long Cartridge and a .22 LR cartridge for comparison.

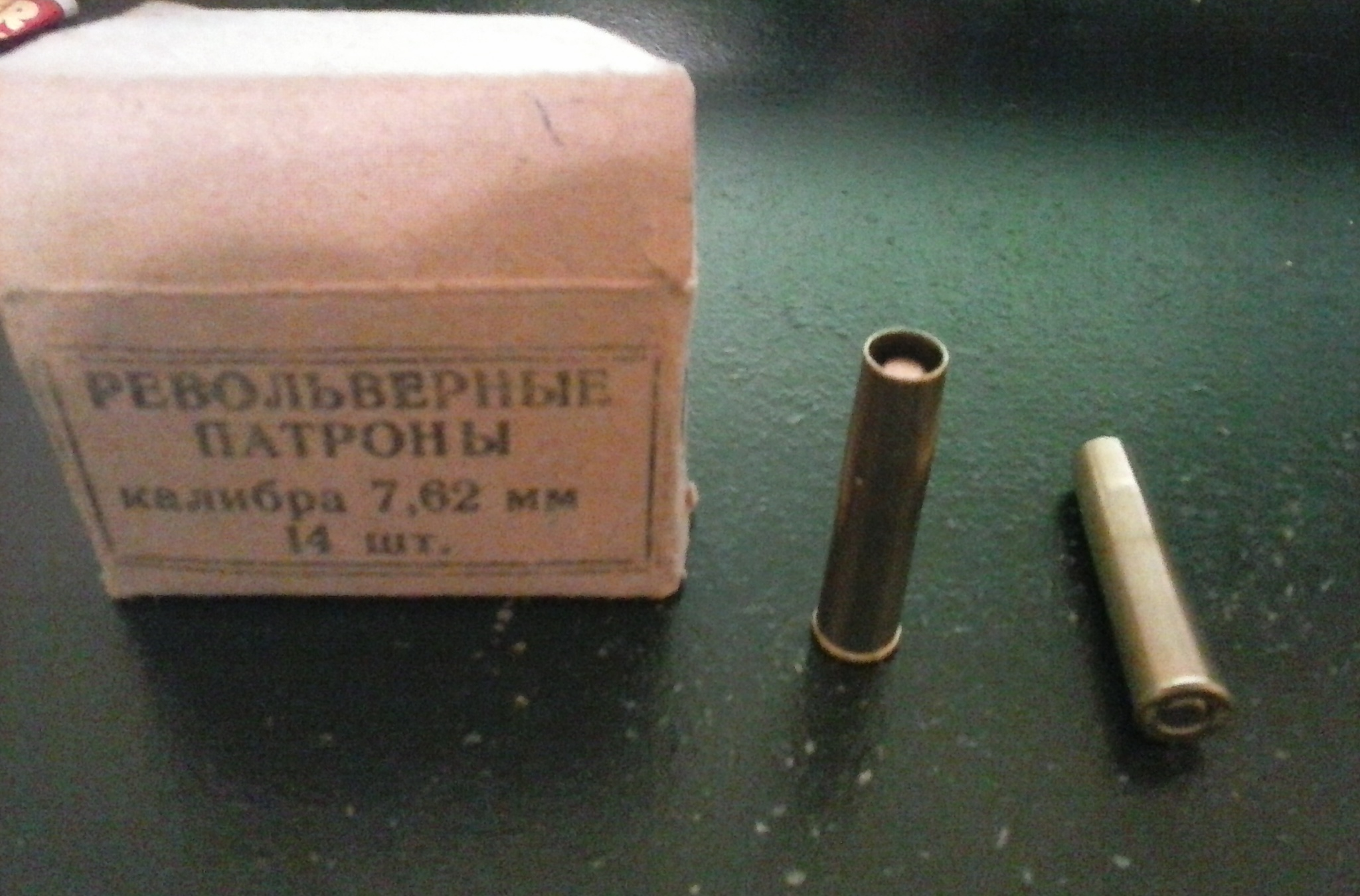
7.62×38R Soviet military ammunition

Many users of this caliber handload their own ammunition. The proper brass cases are also expensive and difficult to come by. Handloaders have had success using dies for the .32-20 Winchester and .30 Carbine to handload the rounds. 32-20 Winchester brass cases are inexpensive, readily available, and can be reformed and used safely in guns chambered for 7.62×38R, but the resulting cartridges are too short to achieve the gas seal. Cut down. 223 Remington brass reformed in 30 carbine dies can be utilized to load for the Nagant also. These will achieve the gas seal, but the case rims will be undersized.

Three other cartridges, the .32 S&W, .32 S&W Long, and .32 H&R Magnum, will also generally chamber and fire in the revolver, but will not achieve the gas seal. The case head of the .32 S&W/H&R is about the same size as the case diameter of the Nagant cartridge, so the case head will sometimes actually end up moving into the chamber, thus preventing an adequate primer strike. Due to the dimensional differences between these cartridges and the original 7.62×38mmR cartridge, this practice is done at the shooter's own risk. The .32 H&R Magnum in particular develops much higher pressures than the 7.62 Nagant or either of the .32 S&W cartridges, which are both late 19th century developments. The most common anomaly when firing these cartridges is the bulging cases.

== Users ==
- East Germany
- Poland
- Russian Empire
- Russian Federation
- Soviet Union

== See also ==
- 7.62 mm caliber
- 7 mm caliber
- List of rimmed cartridges
- List of handgun cartridges
- Table of handgun and rifle cartridges
