= Modèle 1892 revolver =

French service revolver

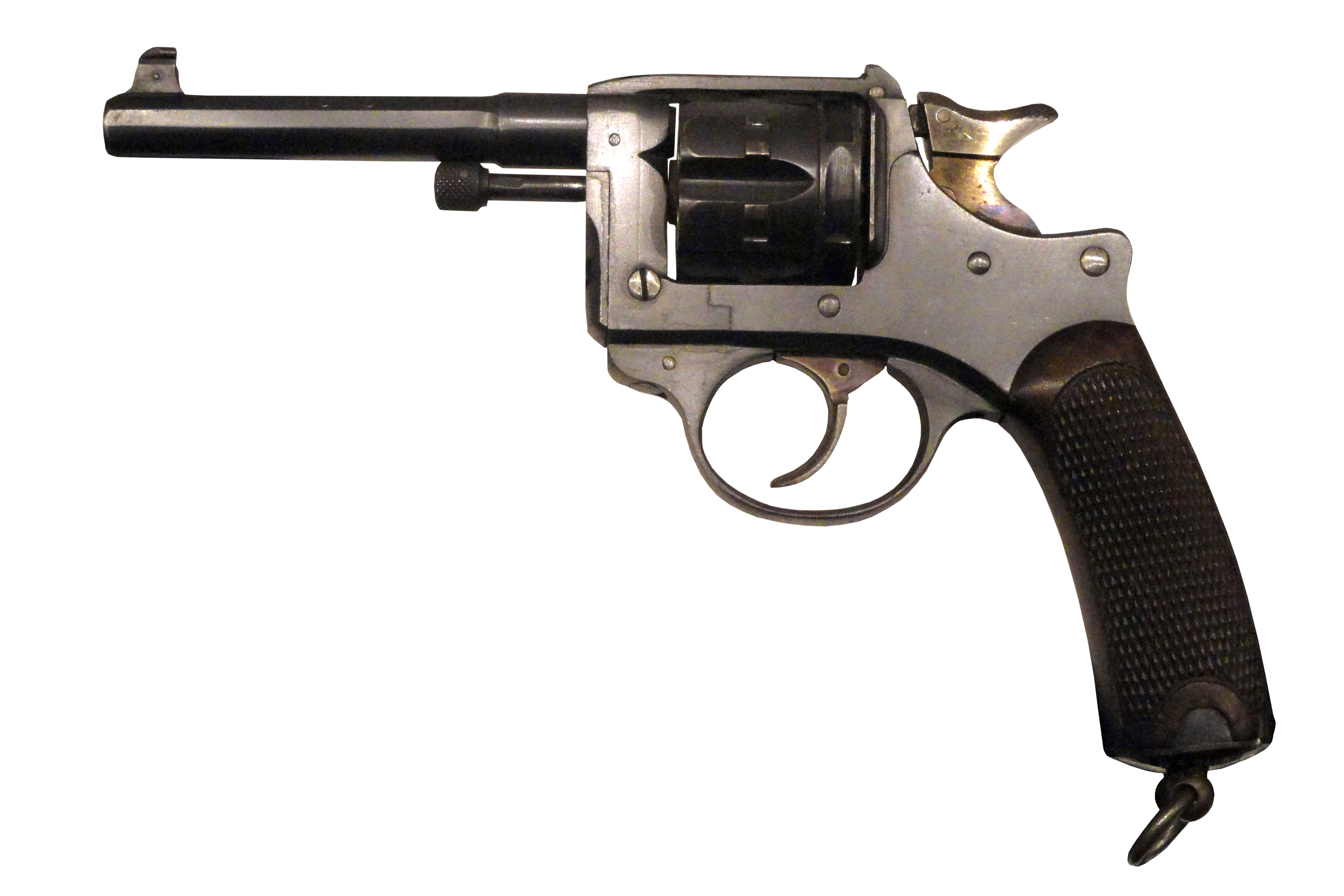
- Modèle 1892 revolver on display at the Liberty Memorial of the National World War I Museum and Memorial, Kansas City.
- Type: Service revolver
- Place of origin: French Third Republic

Service history
- In service: 1892–1960s
- Used by: See Users
- Wars: French colonial expeditions, World War I, Rif War, Polish-Soviet War; Constitutionalist Revolution; World War II, First Indochina War

Production history
- Designer: Manufacture d'armes de Saint-Étienne
- Manufacturer: Manufacture d'armes de Saint-Étienne
- Produced: 1892–1924
- No. built: c. 350,000

Specifications
- Mass: 1.88 pounds (0.85 kg) unloaded
- Length: 9.3 inches (24 cm)
- Cartridge: 8mm French Ordnance
- Action: Double-action/single-action revolver
- Muzzle velocity: 730 ft/s (225 m/s)
- Feed system: 6-round cylinder

The Model 1892 revolver (also known as the "Lebel revolver" and the "St. Etienne 8mm") is a French service revolver produced by Manufacture d'armes de Saint-Étienne as a replacement for the MAS 1873 revolver. It was the standard issue sidearm for officers in the French military during the First World War.

The Modèle 1892 revolver is a solid frame revolver with the cylinder on a separate frame swinging right for manual reloading. The Modèle 1892 was first fielded in 1893 and was prominent among French military officers during First World War, and later the French police until the mid-1960s.

A mechanically tight handgun, the Modèle 1892 fires 8mm French Ordnance rounds with a striking power equivalent to that of a .32 ACP. It is of smaller calibre than many other military revolvers of the time, including its predecessor the MAS 1873 revolver, and the Webley revolver.

== History ==
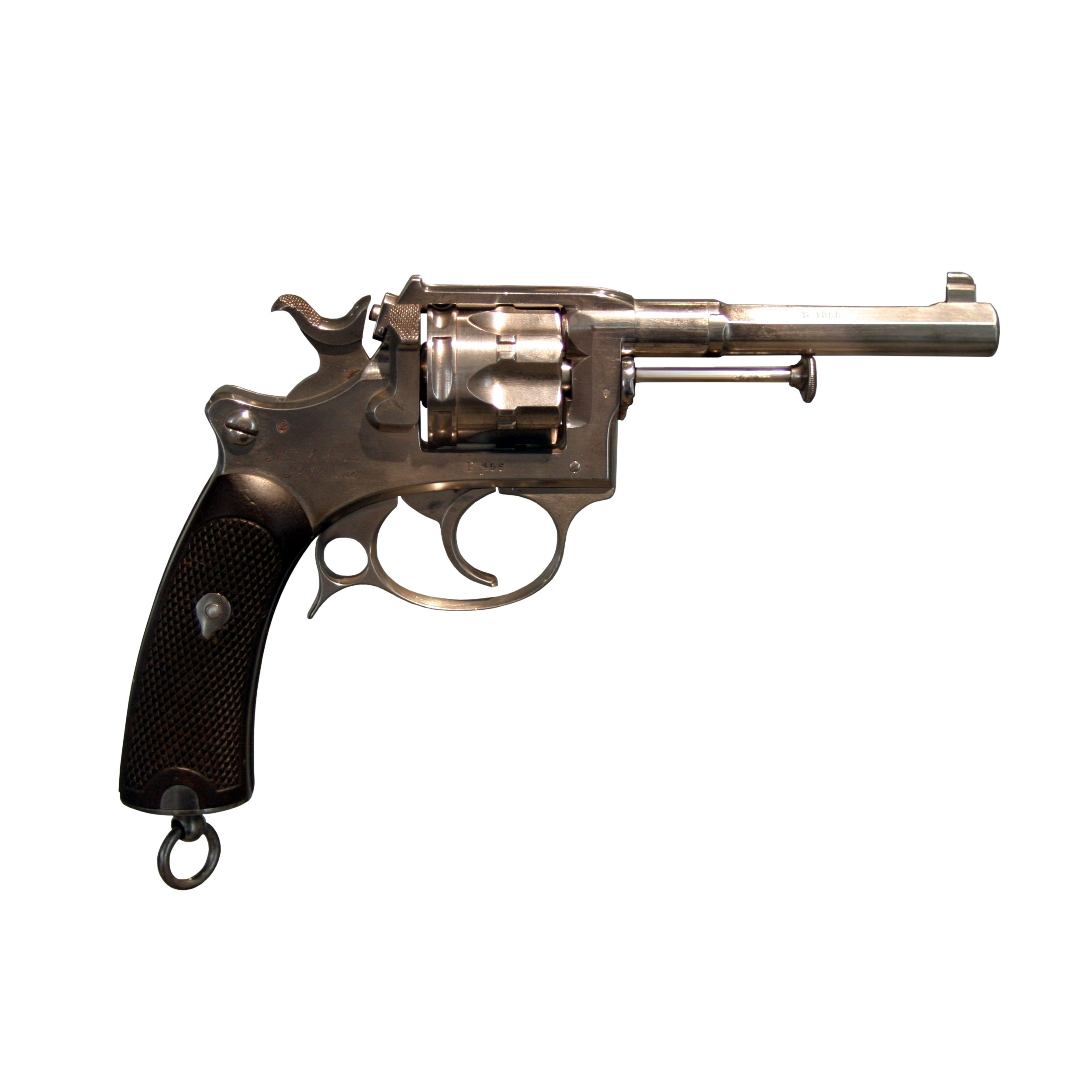
The MAS 1887, a variant of the MAS 1885 chambered in 8mm, and precursor to the MAS 1892

Though it was originally designed to serve as a commissioned officer's personal sidearm, over 350,000 Modèle 1892 revolvers were manufactured between 1892 and 1924. It was issued in the French Army, French Navy, and French Gendarmerie, amongst others. It is commonly, but mistakenly, called a "Lebel revolver" after Colonel Nicolas Lebel, although there is no evidence that Lebel had any involvement in the creation of the gun or its ammunition. Non-commissioned officers continued to carry the older Mle 1873 service revolver, but were also frequently issued .32 ACP automatic pistols (the Ruby pistol) during World War I. The Mle 1892 was later officially replaced by semi-automatic pistols in 1935, but many saw service during World War II and were brought to the United States as souvenirs.

A Modèle 1892 was used in the 2018 Strasbourg attack. This was also the model of revolver used by Violet Gibson in her attempted assassination of Benito Mussolini in 1926.

== Mechanics ==
Originally chambered for an 8mm black-powder cartridge closely resembling the .32-20 WCF round, later models issued during World War I and thereafter fired the same 8mm cartridge loaded with smokeless powder. The Mle 1892 revolver is a double-action solid-frame design, with chambers accessed by swinging out the cylinder to the right, allowing the fired cases to be pushed out and the cylinder to be reloaded, after which it is swung back into the frame and locked into place with the case-hardened loading gate on the right of the frame. The left sideplate of the frame can be swung back on a hinge to give access to the gun's internal parts for oiling or cleaning. These parts were numbered to indicate the order of disassembly. The year of manufacture of each revolver is engraved on the right side of the barrel in the form "S 1895", and "Mle 1892" is hand-engraved on the top of the barrel. It was carried in a large, closed leather holster which held twelve rounds of ammunition hidden below the flap.

== Legacy ==
The Mle 1892 can be fired single-action by cocking the hammer first or by double-action by a full trigger pull. Its downside is the relative weakness, for a military handgun, of its 8×27mm ammunition. In terms of striking power, it just barely reaches the level of the .32 ACP.

A 1935 ballistic report on the assassination of Louis Barthou revealed that he had been hit by an 8 mm Modèle 1892 revolver round, commonly used in weapons carried by French police.

== Users ==
- Algeria
- Belgium
- Brazil: Adopted by the São Paulo Public Force in 1911 following the French military mission
- Czechoslovakia
- France
- Monaco: Compagnie des Carabiniers du Prince
- Romania: Adopted in 1896 as Revolver Model 1896
- Spain
- Vietnam
- Yugoslavia
