= List of military equipment of Turkey during World War II =

The Turkish Armed Forces utilized a wide range of weapons from 1 September 1939, the date of the German invasion of Poland, to V-E Day, 8 May 1945, which is generally accepted as the end of the Second World War in Europe.

The Turkish declaration of war on Germany and Japan was made on 23 February 1945; Turkish forces did not actually engage in combat against either state.

== Army equipment ==
The Turkish Army utilized a wide range of fighting vehicles during the Second World War.

=== Tanks ===
- T-26- Soviet AFVs bought before World War II in 1930s
- T-27
- T-28 (medium tank) - According to one source, two were sold to Turkey in 1935, along with 60 T-26, five T-27 tankettes, and about 60 BA-6 armoured cars to form the 1st Tank Regiment of the 2nd Cavalry Division at Luleburgaz.
- Panzer III- Both Axis and western Allies in 1943 gifted tanks to Turkey to try to get them to join their side.
- Panzer IV
- Valentine tank - Turkey received 200 Valentine IIIs between 1941 and 1944.
- Vickers 6-ton
- M4 Sherman - 34 delivered in January 1945.

=== Light tanks ===
- M3 Stuart - 210 British M3s received from 1942 to 1944.

=== Armoured vehicles ===
- BA-3 & 6
- Universal Carrier

=== Rifles ===
- Mauser Model 1903 - Models 1903 and 1905 were still in service in the 1960s.
- Gewehr 88/05
- Mauser Gewehr 98
- Mauser Model 1887 Turkish Mauser M1871/84 version
- Ottoman-Mauser Model 1890 Turkish Mauser M1889 version
- Mauser Model 1893
- Mauser M1903
- Mauser M1905 and Mauser M1908
- Mauser Karabiner 98k
- vz. 24
- vz. 98/22
- Mosin-Nagant M1891/30
- Berthier M1916
- M1 Carbine

=== Sidearms ===
- Beholla M1915
- Browning FN M1903
- Browning FN M1910 & FN M1922
- CZ vz. 27
- Frommer M1912 Stop
- Luger P08
- Mauser C96
- Walther PP
- Smith & Wesson No. 3

=== Submachine guns ===
- M3 SMG
- Bergmann MP18/I
- Sten

=== Light machine guns ===
- Bergmann MG15nA
- Chauchat
- M1918 BAR
- MG 08/15
- MG 34
- ZB vz. 26

=== Machine guns ===
- Hotchkiss Mle 1914 machine gun in 7.92×57mm Mauser
- Schwazlose M1907/12
- DWM MG08
- Maxim
- Vickers machine gun
- PM M1910

== Aircraft ==
The Turkish Air Force (TAF) had three battalions in 1928; three regiments in 1932; and three brigades in 1939. Turkey ordered 24 Heinkel He 111J-1s in March 1937, which were quickly received within about seven months.

The TAF received large numbers of new aircraft in 1939-1945. Initially 59 Supermarine Spitfire Mk. Is were approved for export to Turkey, but after two were delivered, the delivery of the remainder were stopped in May 1940. Later, reportedly, Spitfires Mark V and IX were delivered. Other new aircraft for the TAF included Curtiss Falcon CW-22R/B, Fairey Battle Mk. I (received 30 aircraft, including 1 target tug), Avro Anson I, Hawker Hurricane I/II, Morane-Saulnier M.S.406, Curtiss Tomahawk (40 delivered from British stocks in the Middle East, used 1942-44, including at Gaziemir), Curtiss P-40 Kittyhawk, Westland Lysander (36 Mark III supplied in 1939), Bristol Blenheim IV/V, Bristol Beaufort, Bristol Beaufighter Mk.I/X, Focke-Wulf Fw 190-A3, Martin 187 Baltimore, de Havilland Mosquito Mk.III/IV, Douglas B-26B/C Invader, Republic P-47D Thunderbolt and Douglas C-47A/B Dakota.

Eleven U.S. Consolidated B-24 Liberators made an emergency landing in Turkey coming from bombing of Ploesti within Operation Tidal Wave. All of them were interned by Turkey and five of them were repaired and served in the Turkish Air Force.

In 1947, Turkey received aircraft from Britain, including four Spitfire PR. XIXs, which were reportedly based at Merzifon and operational in 1948.

== See also ==
- List of equipment of the Turkish Land Forces
