= Belgian Mauser =

Mauser rifles used by or produced in Belgium

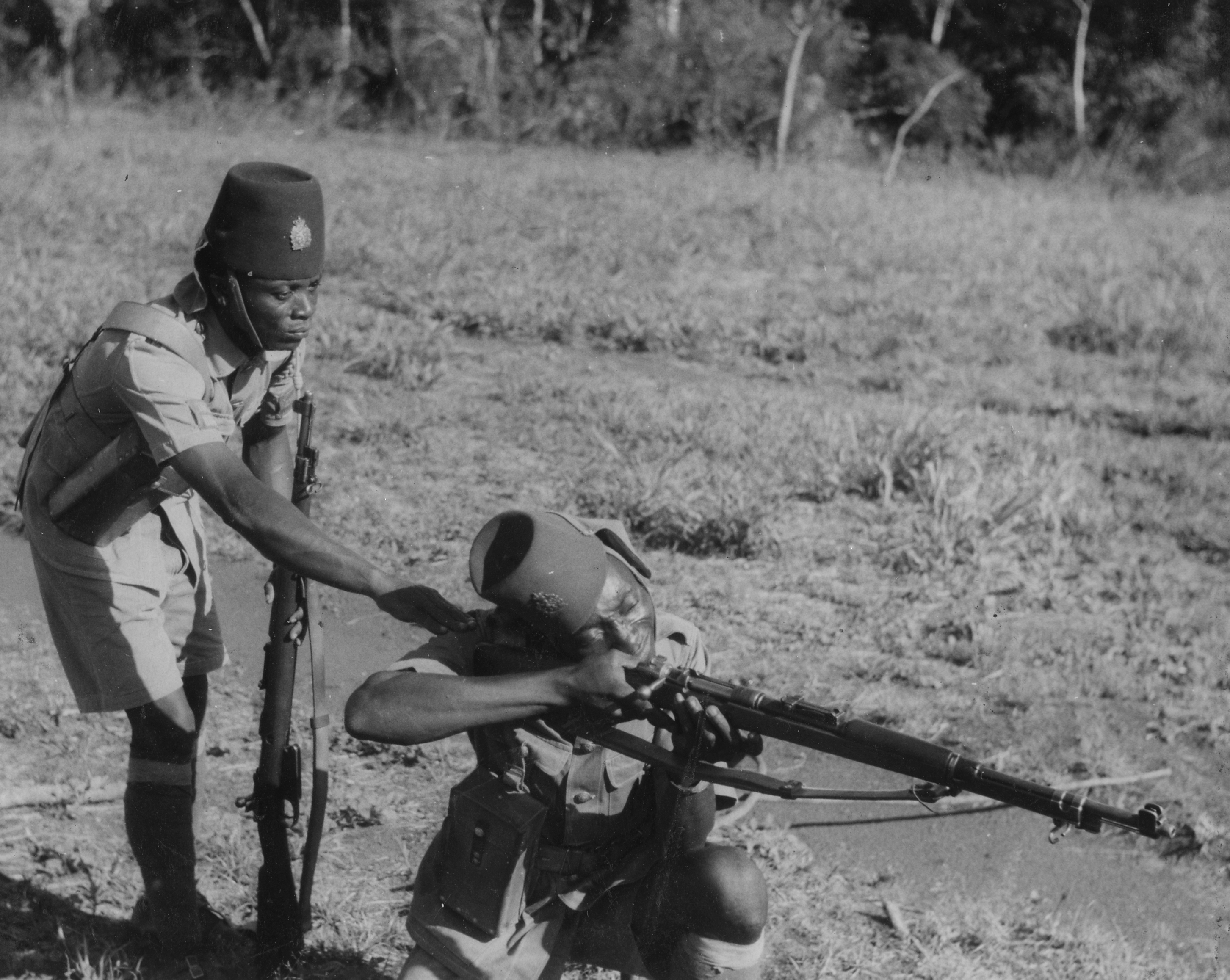
Two Force Publique soldiers wielding Mauser Model 1889/36 rifles, 1943

The Belgian Mauser can describe many Mauser rifles used by the Belgian Armed Forces or produced by the Belgian plant of FN Herstal.

- The Model 1889 rifle and carbine, including Turkish Model 1890, Model 1916 and Model 1899/36 variants, all chambered in 7.65×53mm Mauser
- The Model 1893 and 1894 rifle and carbine, chambered in 7×57mm Mauser, produced for Spain and Brazil while some were used by the Belgian Gendarmerie, the Garde Civique and the Congo Free State
- The Gewehr 98, in 7.92×57mm Mauser, captured from Germany after World War I
- The Model 1935 short rifle, chambered in 7.65 and the Model 35/46 chambered in .30-06 Springfield
- The Model 1924, Model 1930 and Model 1950 short rifle, mostly produced for export but also used in Belgium post-World War II
- The Karabiner 98k, produced in Belgium after 1945
- The Model 30-11 sniper rifle, in 7.62×51mm NATO

== See also ==
- Turkish Mauser
