= Mauser Model 1935 =

Mauser Model 1935 may refer to:

- The Belgian Mauser Model 1935
- The Brazilian Mauser Model 1935, a Mauser Model 1908 variant made in Germany
- The German Karabiner 98k
- The Peruvian Model 1935, FN Model 24/30 variant made in Belgium
