= Turkish Mauser =

Series of Turkish Mauser rifles

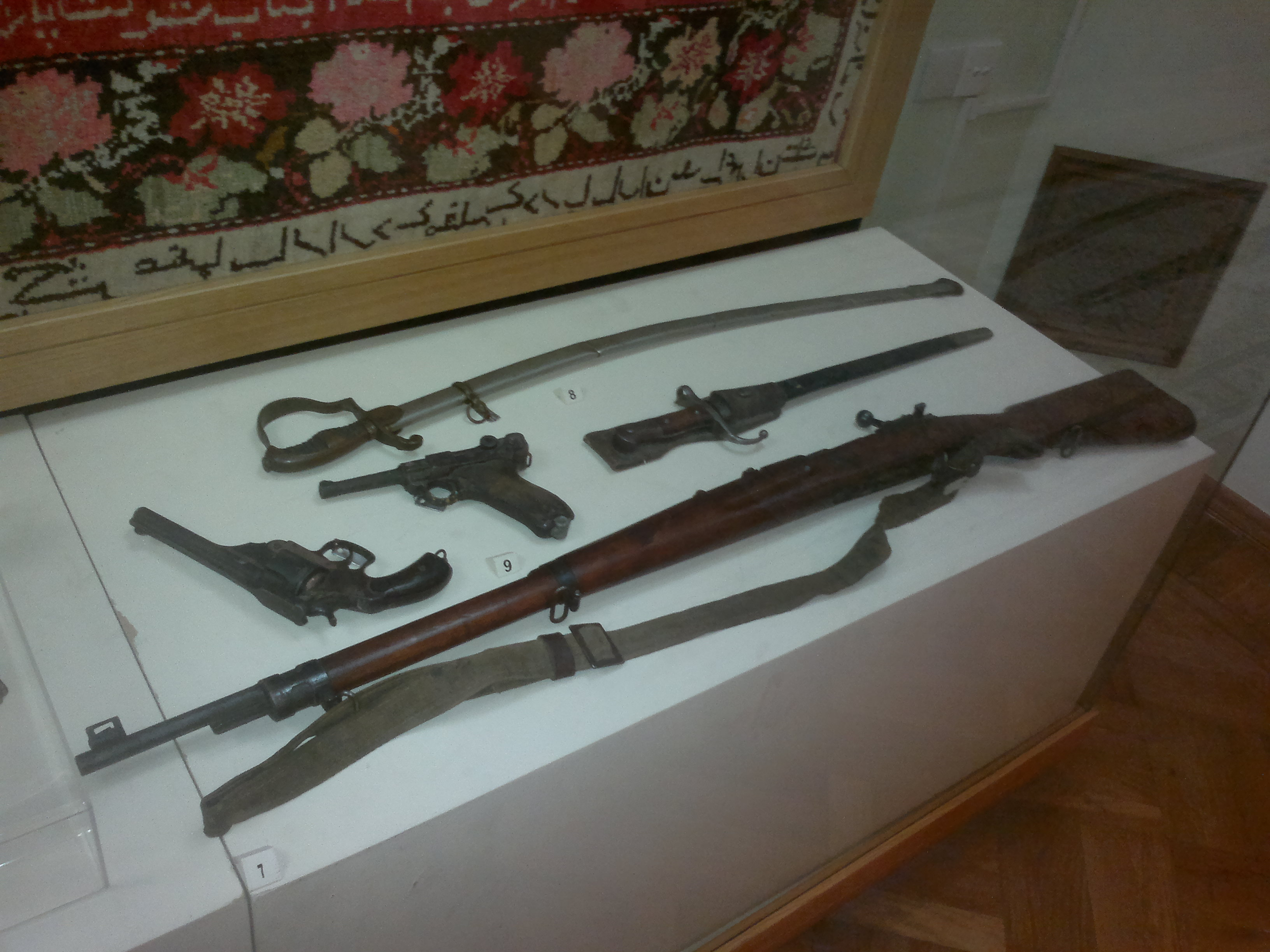

The Turkish Mauser can be used to describe many Mauser rifles used by the Ottoman Empire and then the Republic of Turkey.

- The Mauser Model 1887 rifle, chambered in 9.5x60mm
- The Mauser Model 1890 rifle and carbine, chambered in 7.65×53mm Mauser
- The Mauser Model 1893 rifle, chambered in 7.65×53mm and later in 7.92×57mm Mauser
- The Mauser Model 1903 rifle and short rifle; and the Mauser Model 1905 carbine, both chambered in 7.65 and later in 7.92
- The Gewehr 98, received during and after World War I, in 7.92
- The Vz. 98/22 rifle, produced in Czechoslovakia, in 7.92
- The Mauser Model 1938, short rifle standardization of the Model 1893, Model 1903, Gewehr 88, Gewehr 98 and Vz. 98/22, in 7.92 More than 150000 rifles were converted to 7.92 with barrel change between 1932-1950 at Kırıkkale Armaments Factory. It is also known as "Model 38 Türk Mavzeri"
- The Karabiner 98k in 7.92, bought after World War II

== See also ==
- Belgian Mauser
- Mauser M1902
- Mauser M1913 Selbstladegewehr
- Mauser M1916
