= Fittipaldi =

Fittipaldi may refer to:

== People ==
- Rafael Fittipaldi, designer of the 1914 Fittipaldi machine gun

Fittipaldi racing family

- Wilson Fittipaldi (Senior), a Brazilian motorsport journalist and founder of the Mil Milhas Brasil race
  - His elder son Wilson Fittipaldi Júnior, a race car driver. Emerson's elder brother and Christian's father
    - Christian Fittipaldi, a race car driver, Wilson Júnior's son
  - Wilson Sr's younger son Emerson Fittipaldi, two-time Formula One Champion and Indianapolis 500 winner
    - Emerson Fittipaldi Jr., a racing driver, Emerson's son and uncle to Enzo and Pietro
    - Enzo Fittipaldi, a racing driver, Emerson's grandson and Pietro's brother
    - Pietro Fittipaldi, a racing driver, Emerson's grandson and Enzo's brother

== Sports ==
- Emerson Fittipaldi Speedway, Autódromo Internacional Nelson Piquet, Jacarepaguá, Rio de Janeiro, Brazil; a trapezoidal oval racetrack within the autodrome facility

Fittipaldi racing family auto racing motorsport teams

- Team Fittipaldi, a 1970s racing team sponsored by Bardahl
- Fittipaldi Automotive, a Formula One team owned by brothers Wilson Júnior and Emerson
- Fittipaldi-Dingman Racing, a 2003 CART season team, owned by Emerson and James Dingman

== Other uses ==
- Fittipaldi Motors LLC, a car company of Emerson Fittipaldi
- Fittipaldi machine gun, recoil-operated, patented 1914 by Rafael Fittipaldi
