= Fittipaldi machine gun =

Ametralladora Fittipaldi 1912
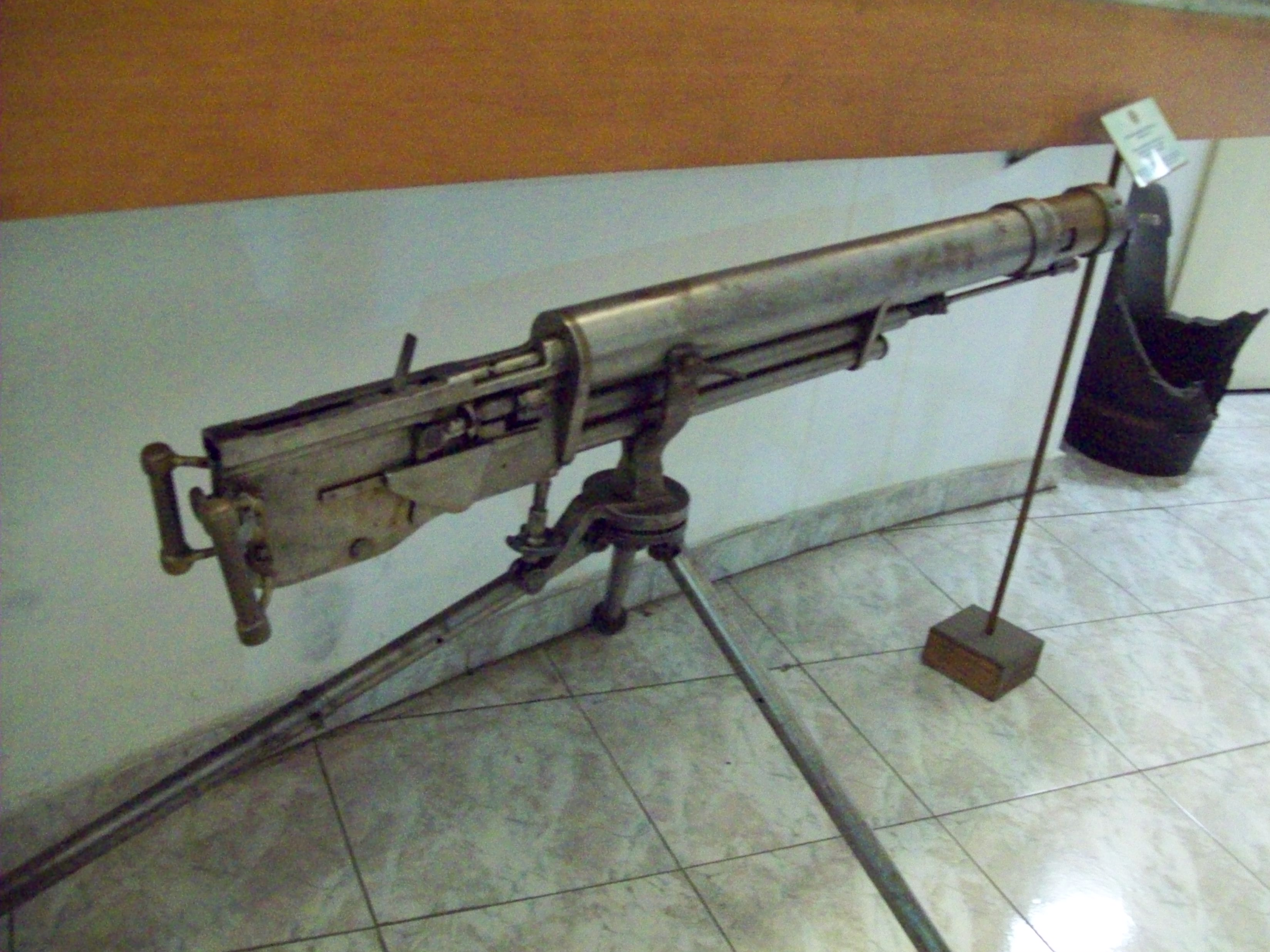
- The Fittipaldi Machine Gun on display at the Museo de Armas de la Nación in Buenos Aires
- Type: Machine gun
- Place of origin: Argentina

Production history
- Designer: Rafael Fittipaldi
- Designed: 1912

Specifications
- Cartridge: 7.65×53mm Argentine
- Caliber: 7.65×53mm
- Action: Recoil
- Feed system: Belt

The Fittipaldi machine gun is a recoil-operated machine gun designed by Rafael Fittipaldi (an Italian immigrant to Argentina) and patented as USPTO number 1,099,245, of June 9, 1914.

== Description ==
The Fittipaldi machine gun uses the barrel of the Argentinian Mauser Model 1891 rifle as well as its bolt, the latter adapted for rectilinear action. It was fed by a non-disintegrating belt and used a traditional tripod as mount. A water jacket covered the entire length of its barrel, giving it an external appearance similar to the Lewis Gun.

== History ==
The Fittipaldi machine gun was not adopted by the Argentine Army. Little is known about its history or performance, including why it was not adopted. The prototype, dated to 1912, is on display in Room XVI "Freedom Walk" from the Museum of Arms of the Nation, Buenos Aires, Argentina.
