= Mauser Model 1903 =

Ottoman Model 1903 rifle
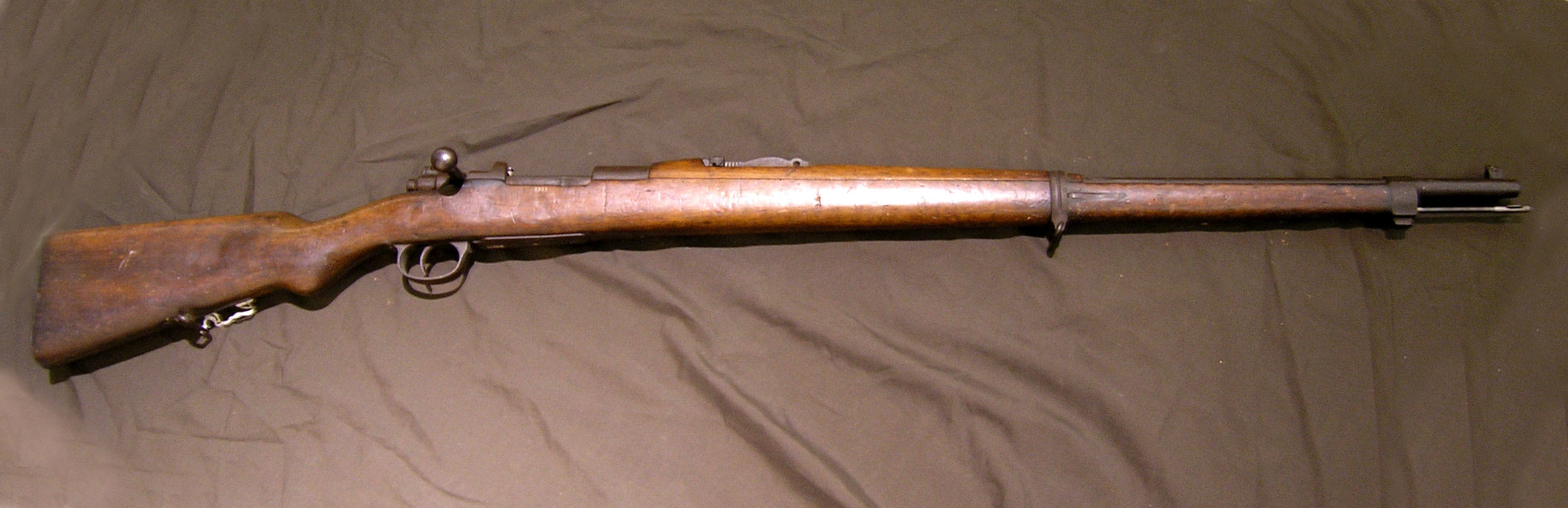
- Mauser Model 1903 rifle in a museum.
- Type: Bolt-action rifle
- Place of origin: German Empire

Service history
- In service: 1903–1960s
- Used by: Ottoman Empire; Republic of Turkey; Austria-Hungary
- Wars: Italo-Turkish War; Balkan Wars; World War I; Turkish War of Independence

Production history
- Designed: 1903
- Manufacturer: Mauser
- Produced: 1903–1910
- Variants: Model 1905 carbine

Specifications
- Mass: Model 1903: 4.17 kg (9.2 lb); Model 1905 carbine: 3.6 kg (7.9 lb)
- Length: Model 1903: 124 cm (49 in); Model 1905 carbine: 105.6 cm (41.6 in)
- Barrel length: Model 1903: 74 cm (29 in); Model 1905 carbine: 55.6 cm (21.9 in)
- Cartridge: 7.65×53mm Mauser
- Action: Bolt-action
- Muzzle velocity: 650 metres per second (2,100 ft/s)
- Feed system: 5-round stripper clip, internal magazine
- Sights: Iron sights adjustable to 2,000 metres (2,200 yd)

The Mauser Model 1903 (also known as the Ottoman Mauser) was a Gewehr 98-pattern bolt-action rifle designed for the Ottoman Army. They were produced by Mauser in Germany.

== Design ==
The Mauser 1903 was a modified version Gewehr 98 The Lange Visier sight was replaced by a tangent leaf sight, the nose cap was simplified, the rifle could be fitted with older Ottoman M1890 bayonets. The weapon had curved arm on its bolt stop to block the cartridge clip when the cartridges are stripped into the magazine. It also had a larger receiver and a longer cocking cam and firing pin than the German variant.

=== Model 1905 carbine ===
The Model 1905 carbine was a shortened version of the Model 1903, designed for cavalry and artillery units.

== Service ==
After the adoption of the long rifle, 200,000 were received before 1905. 406 Marine-gewehre were delivered to the Ottoman Navy in 1904, 7,617 to the Gendarmerie in Ottoman Macedonia. 1,100 more, modified to fire spitzer bullets and sometimes known as M1910, were ordered in 1910. The Ottoman customs also received some. The Model 1905 carbine was produced between 1903 and 1906. 30,000 M1908 carbines were delivered in 1908 and 1909.

The Model 1903 saw combat during the Italo-Turkish War, the Balkan Wars, World War I and the Turkish War of Independence. After World War I, most of these weapons were modified to fire the 7.92×57mm Mauser round. Many of the long rifles were refurbished as Mauser Model 1938 short rifles. Models 1903 and 1905 were still in service in the 1960s.

== Users ==
=== Former users ===
- Ottoman Empire
- Turkey: Models 1903 and 1905 were still in service in the 1960s.

== See also ==
- Turkish Mauser
