= 7.65×53mm Argentine =

German rifle cartridge

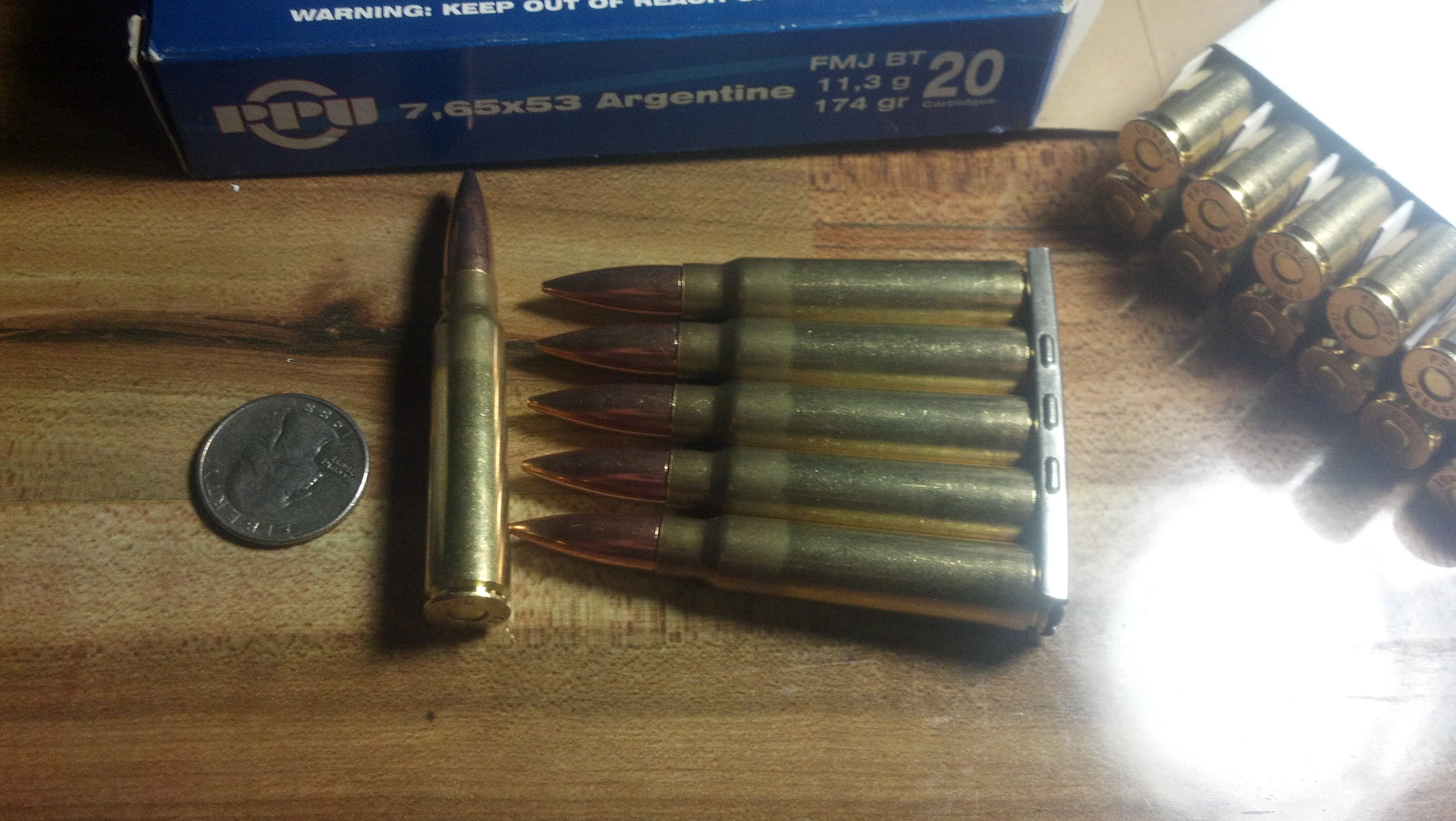
- 7.65×53mm Argentine
- Type: Rifle
- Place of origin: German Empire

Service history
- In service: 1889–1970s
- Used by: See Usage
- Wars: World War I Chaco War; Ecuadorian–Peruvian War; World War II

Production history
- Designer: Paul Mauser
- Variants: 7.65×53mmR (rimmed)

Specifications
- Case type: Rimless, bottleneck
- Bullet diameter: 7.94 mm (0.313 in)
- Land diameter: 7.65 mm (0.301 in)
- Neck diameter: 8.78 mm (0.346 in)
- Shoulder diameter: 10.90 mm (0.429 in)
- Base diameter: 12.01 mm (0.473 in)
- Rim diameter: 12.05 mm (0.474 in)
- Rim thickness: 1.00 mm (0.039 in)
- Case length: 53.60 mm (2.110 in)
- Overall length: 76.00 mm (2.992 in)
- Case capacity: 3.70 cm^{3} (57.1 gr H_{2}O)
- Rifling twist: 280 mm (1 in 11.02 in)
- Primer type: Large rifle
- Maximum pressure (C.I.P.): 390.00 MPa (56,565 psi)

Ballistic performance
Bullet mass/type	Velocity	Energy
155 gr (10 g) FMJ-BT	2,710 ft/s (830 m/s)	2,530 ft⋅lbf (3,430 J)
174 gr (11 g) FMJ-BT	2,460 ft/s (750 m/s)	2,340 ft⋅lbf (3,170 J)
180 gr (12 g) SP	2,542 ft/s (775 m/s)	2,588 ft⋅lbf (3,509 J)
211 gr (14 g) FMJ	2,130 ft/s (650 m/s)	2,150 ft⋅lbf (2,920 J)
- Sources: Cartridges of the World, 11th ed

The 7.65×53mm Argentine (designated as the 7,65 × 53 Arg. by the C.I.P.) is a first-generation smokeless powder rimless bottlenecked centerfire rifle cartridge developed for use in the Mauser Model 1889 rifle by Paul Mauser of the Mauser company. It is also known as 7.65×53mm Argentine rimless, 7.65mm Argentine, 7.65×53mm Belgian Mauser, 7.65mm Belgian (in the United States), and 7.65×53mm Mauser (in Belgium).

== History ==
The 7.65×53mm Argentine was the result of considerable experimentation by Paul Mauser to optimize the bullet diameter for use with the new smokeless propellant introduced as Poudre B in the 1886 pattern 8×50mmR Lebel that started a military rifle ammunition revolution. At the time of its development it was a high-performance smokeless-powder cartridge. Judging by the dimensions of the casing, it was developed from the earlier Patrone 88 adopted into German service.

This cartridge was loaded commercially by many manufacturers in the United States until about 1936. Sporting ammunition in this caliber is still loaded in Europe. Norma, Prvi Partizan, and Fabricaciones Militares (FM) currently produce 7.65×53mm ammunition. Cases are easily formed from .30-06 brass; just resize and trim. For charging the cartridge, use .303 British load data.

== Cartridge dimensions ==
The 7.65×53mm Argentine has 3.70 ml (57.1 grains H_{2}O) cartridge case capacity. The exterior shape of the case was designed to promote reliable case feeding and extraction in bolt-action rifles and machine guns alike, under extreme conditions.

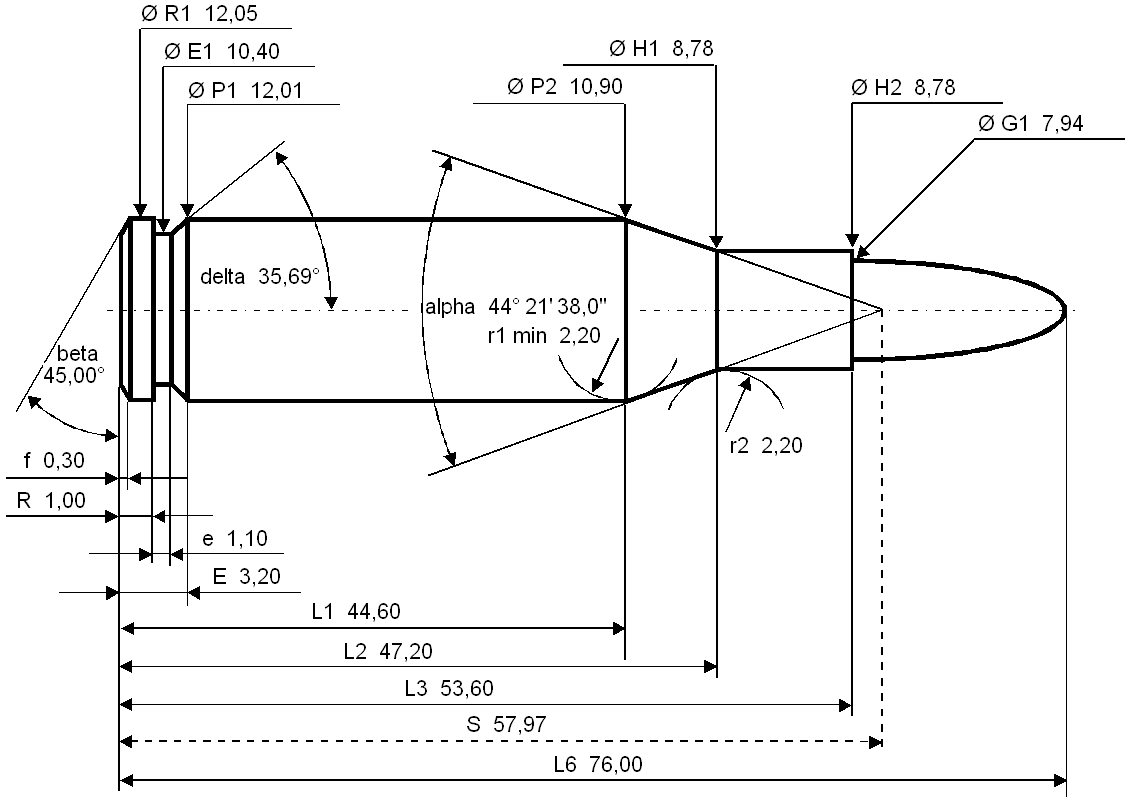

7.65×53mm Argentine maximum C.I.P. cartridge dimensions. All sizes in millimeters (mm).

Americans would define the shoulder angle at alpha/2 ≈ 22.2 degrees. The common rifling twist rate for this cartridge is 280 mm (1 in 11.02 in); although 250 mm (1 in 9.84 in) was also used, see below, 4 grooves, Ø lands = 7.65 mm, Ø grooves = 7.92 mm, land width = 4.20 mm and the primer type is large rifle.

According to the official Commission Internationale Permanente pour l'Epreuve des Armes à Feu Portatives (CIP) rulings the 7.65×53mm Argentine can handle up to 390.00 MPa (56,565 psi) P_{max} piezo pressure. In CIP member countries every rifle cartridge combination has to be proofed at 125% of this maximum pressure to certify fit for sale to consumers. This means that 7.65×53mm Argentine chambered arms in CIP regulated countries are currently (2013) proof tested at 487.50 MPa (70,706 psi) PE piezo pressure.

Rifles chambered for the 7.65×53mm Argentine must be capable of handling long-action length (≤ 3.34 in (84.84 mm) overall length) cartridges.

The American .308 Winchester cartridge is a close ballistic twin of the 7.65×53mm Argentine. The .308 Winchester being a post World War II cartridge developed by Winchester provides similar performance in a short-action length (≤ 2.955 in (75.06 mm) overall length format.

Due to the cartridge case's dimensions, production of 7.65mm brass can be accomplished by reforming .30-06 Springfield cases.

== Military ammunition ==
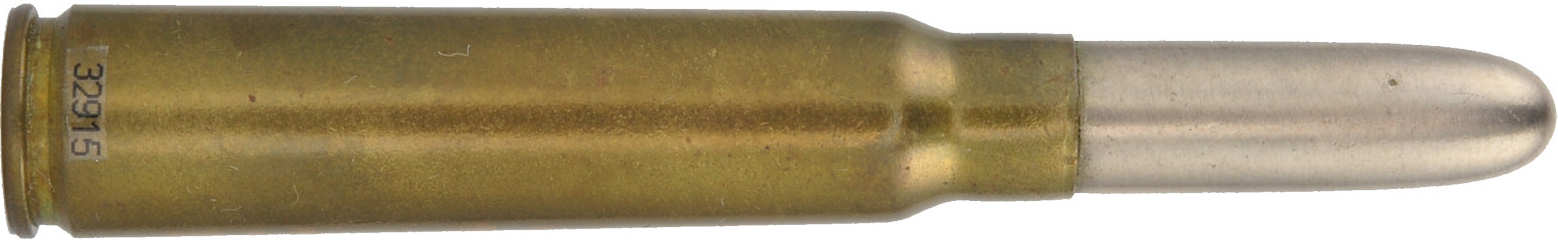
Round-nosed 7.65×53mm Argentine ball ammunition

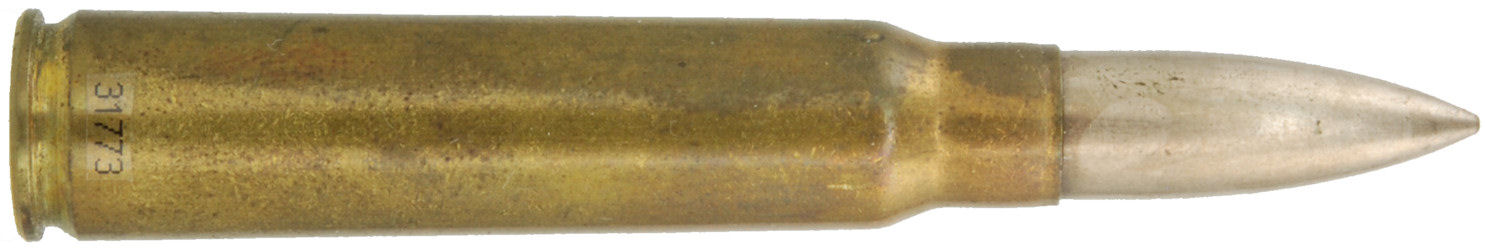
Spitzer 7.65×53mm Argentine ball ammunition

The original 1889 pattern military ball ammunition was introduced in the Mauser Model 1889 and loaded with a 13.65 grams (210.7 gr) round-nosed bullet fired at a muzzle velocity of 650 m/s (2,133 ft/s) with 2,884 J (2,127 ft⋅lbf) muzzle energy.

Following the lead of French and German army commands in developing the spitzer - a pointed-tip - bullet shape, later military ball ammunition was loaded with a 10.00 g (154.3 gr) spitzer bullet fired at a muzzle velocity of 830 m/s (2,723 ft/s) with 3,445 J (2,541 ft⋅lbf) muzzle energy from a 589 mm (23.2 in) long barrel became available. It had a maximum range of 3,700 m (4,046 yd). Calculating the trajectory from the previous sentence indicates a ballistic coefficient (G1 BC) of approximately 0.34.

After that, military ball ammunition loaded with an 11.25 g (173.6 gr) spitzer bullet fired at a muzzle velocity of 725 m/s (2,379 ft/s) with 2,957 J (2,181 ft⋅lbf) muzzle energy from a 589 mm (23.2 in) long barrel became available. Besides a pointed nose this projectile also had a boat tail to further reduce drag. It had a maximum range of 5,000 m (5,468 yd). Calculating the trajectory from the previous sentence indicates a ballistic coefficient (G1 BC) of approximately 0.55.

== Military use ==
=== Users ===
At one time, the 7.65×53mm Argentine cartridge saw widespread military use. It was used by:

- Argentina
- Belgium
- Bolivia
- Colombia
- Ecuador
- Ottoman Empire
- Paraguay
- Peru
- Spain

=== Firearms chambered in 7.65×53mm ===
- Model 1889
- Model 1890
- Model 1891 The original rifling twist rate of Argentinian Mauser 1891 rifles was 250 mm (1 in 9.84 in).
- Model 1893
- Model 1903
- Model 1905
- Model 1907
- Model 1909
- Model 1927
- FN Model 1930
- Vz. 32
- Standardmodell 1933
- FN Model 1935.
- Fittipaldi machine gun
- Madsen machine gun
- Lewis gun
- Vickers-Berthier Mk.I machine gun
- MG 08
- Chauchat Light machine gun
- FN Mle1930 / D machine gun
- CZ Brno ZB-26 machine gun
- CZ Brno ZB-30 machine gun
- SIG KE7
- FN Model 1949 semi-automatic rifle.
