= Belgian Mauser Model 1935 =

Fusil Modèle 1935
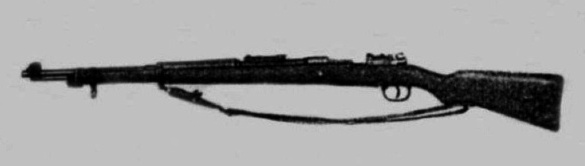
- Type: Rifle
- Place of origin: Belgium

Service history
- In service: 1935–1960s
- Used by: Belgium; Argentina; Nazi Germany; Peru
- Wars: World War II

Production history
- Designer: Mauser
- Designed: 1889
- Manufacturer: Fabrique Nationale; Manufacture d’Armes de L’Etat
- Produced: 1935–1940
- Variants: Model 35/46

Specifications
- Mass: 4.3 kg (9.48 lb)
- Length: 1,100 mm (43 in)
- Barrel length: 600 mm (24 in)
- Cartridge: 7.65×53mm Mauser
- Caliber: 7.65mm
- Action: Bolt-action
- Muzzle velocity: 2,755 feet per second (840 m/s)
- Feed system: 5-round box magazine
- Sights: Iron sights adjustable to 2,000 metres (2,200 yd)

The Mauser Model 1935, officially the Fusil Modèle 1935, was a Belgian Mauser bolt-action rifle. Derived from the Belgian Mauser Model 1889 and the Mauser 1898, it was used during World War II.

== History and design ==
The Belgian Armed Forces had adopted the Mauser Model 1889, locally produced. After the First World War, the defeated Germany gave numbers of Mauser G.98 and Kar 98AZ to the kingdom. In the late 1920s and early 1930s, Fabrique Nationale was manufacturing the FN Model 24 and Model 30, but lack of funding prevented the Army from buying these modern short rifles. In 1935, a new rifle was designed to replace all the rifles and carbines used in the different units.

The Model 1935 combined elements of the Mauser 1889 (breech, magazine and stock) and of the Gewehr 98, but it was shorter. Some Model 35 rifles were modernised Mauser 98. Both the Manufacture d’Armes de L’État and the FN Herstal produced it between 1935 and 1940. A sniping version was also developed before the war.

After the war, some Model 35 rifles were modified to fire in .30-06 Springfield, the cartridge of the American weapons used by the post-war Belgian Army. They were known as Model 35/46.

== Service ==
The Belgian Army adopted it in 1935 but the Model 1935 never went into large-scale production. It served during World War II alongside the Fusil Modèle 1936, a Model 1889 upgraded with some features of the Modèle 1935.

Nazi Germany captured many rifles after the invasion of Belgium. The standard Fusil 35 was designated Gewehr 262(b) and the sniping rifle Zielfernrohrgewehr 264(b). These rifles were used by second-line German units.

The Argentine government purchased a batch of slightly modified Model 35s to equip the Buenos Aires Provincial Police. Delivered in 1935-1936, they were kept in service into the 1960s.

== Users ==
- Argentina: Buenos Aires Provincial Police
- Belgium
- Nazi Germany
- Peru

== Bibliography ==
- Ball, Robert W. D. (2011). Mauser Military Rifles of the World. Iola: Gun Digest Books. ISBN 9781440228926.
