= Mauser Model 1893 =

Model 1893
- Illustration of a Mauser Model 1893 rifle
- Type: Bolt-action rifle
- Place of origin: German Empire

Service history
- In service: 1893–1958
- Used by: See Users
- Wars: War of Canudos; Philippine Revolution; Greco-Turkish War (1897); Spanish–American War; Philippine–American War; World War I Contestado War; Rif War; Constitutionalist Revolution; Spanish Civil War; Ifni War

Production history
- Designer: Paul Mauser
- Designed: 1893
- Manufacturer: Mauser; Ludwig Loewe & Company; Deutsche Waffen und Munitionsfabriken; Fabrique Nationale; Fábrica de Armas; Industrias de Guerra de Cataluña
- Produced: 1893–1951

Specifications
- Mass: Rifle: 4 kg (8.8 lb); Carbine: 3.4 / 3.8 kg (7.5 / 8.4 lb)
- Barrel length: m/1893: 738 mm (29.1 in) m/1895: 446 mm (17.6 in) m/1916: 552 mm (21.7 in)
- Cartridge: 7×57mm Mauser; 7.65×53mm Mauser
- Action: Bolt action
- Feed system: 5 round fixed box magazine
- Sights: Iron sights

The Mauser Model 1893 is a bolt-action rifle commonly referred to as the Spanish Mauser, though the model was adopted by other countries in other calibers, most notably the Ottoman Empire. The M1893 was based on the experimental M1892 rifle, which Paul Mauser developed for the Spanish Army as part of a program to correct deficiencies in the earlier 1889, 1890, and 1891 series of Mauser rifles. The M1893 introduced a short staggered-column box magazine that fit flush with the bottom of the stock; the magazine held five smokeless 7×57mm Mauser rounds, which could be reloaded quickly by pushing a stripper clip from the top of the open bolt.

The M1893 was developed into several variants, including a shortened carbine adopted by the Spanish as the M1895, and as the M1913 and M1916 short rifles. All versions of the rifle saw extensive service in the Spanish Army, beginning in the Spanish–American War in 1898, the Rif War of 1920–1927, and the Spanish Civil War of 1936–1939. The M1916 short rifles remained in production in Spain until 1951, and many of these later rifles were converted to shoot either 7.92×57mm Mauser or 7.62×51mm NATO, including some that were extensively modified as the FR7. The converted rifles were used for training and for the Guardia Civil through the 1950s. In Ottoman service, M1893 rifles saw limited action during the Greco-Turkish War of 1897, the Balkan Wars of 1912–1913, and World War I in 1914–1918.

The M1893 proved to be a major success for Mauser, as it provided the basis for later developments, including the Models 1894 and 1896—commonly referred to as Swedish Mausers—the Model 1895, and ultimately the Gewehr 98, one of the most successful bolt-action rifle designs ever produced. For his work, Mauser received the Grand Cross of the Order of Military Merit from Spain. The marked superiority of the M1893 over its American opponent in the Spanish–American War, the Krag–Jørgensens, led the US Army to develop the M1903 Springfield, which itself heavily copied Mauser's designs.

== Development ==
In 1887, the Spanish Army began trials of the Turkish Model 1887 Mauser rifles, which utilized black powder cartridges. These rifles did not satisfy the Spanish Army, and so on 2 December 1891, the Army ordered 1,200 Model 1891 Mausers that used new smokeless powder ammunition. The impetus for the change was a series of defeats of Spanish forces around the enclave at Melilla in North Africa. Trials with these guns provided a series of improvement suggestions for Mauser; in addition to Spanish experiences, by that time, the 1889, 1890, and 1891 series of Mauser rifles had been in service with various armies long enough to highlight deficiencies in the designs. Among the issues that had been identified were an unreliable extractor, a detachable box magazine that was frequently lost and extended below the bottom of the stock, which caused problems with carrying the rifle slung. The stripper clip guide and the clips themselves were also unreliable and the bolt design allowed the rifle to double-feed rounds of ammunition. As a result, Paul Mauser decided to design a new rifle that would correct the problems with the earlier rifles, and allow the company to secure more arms contracts.

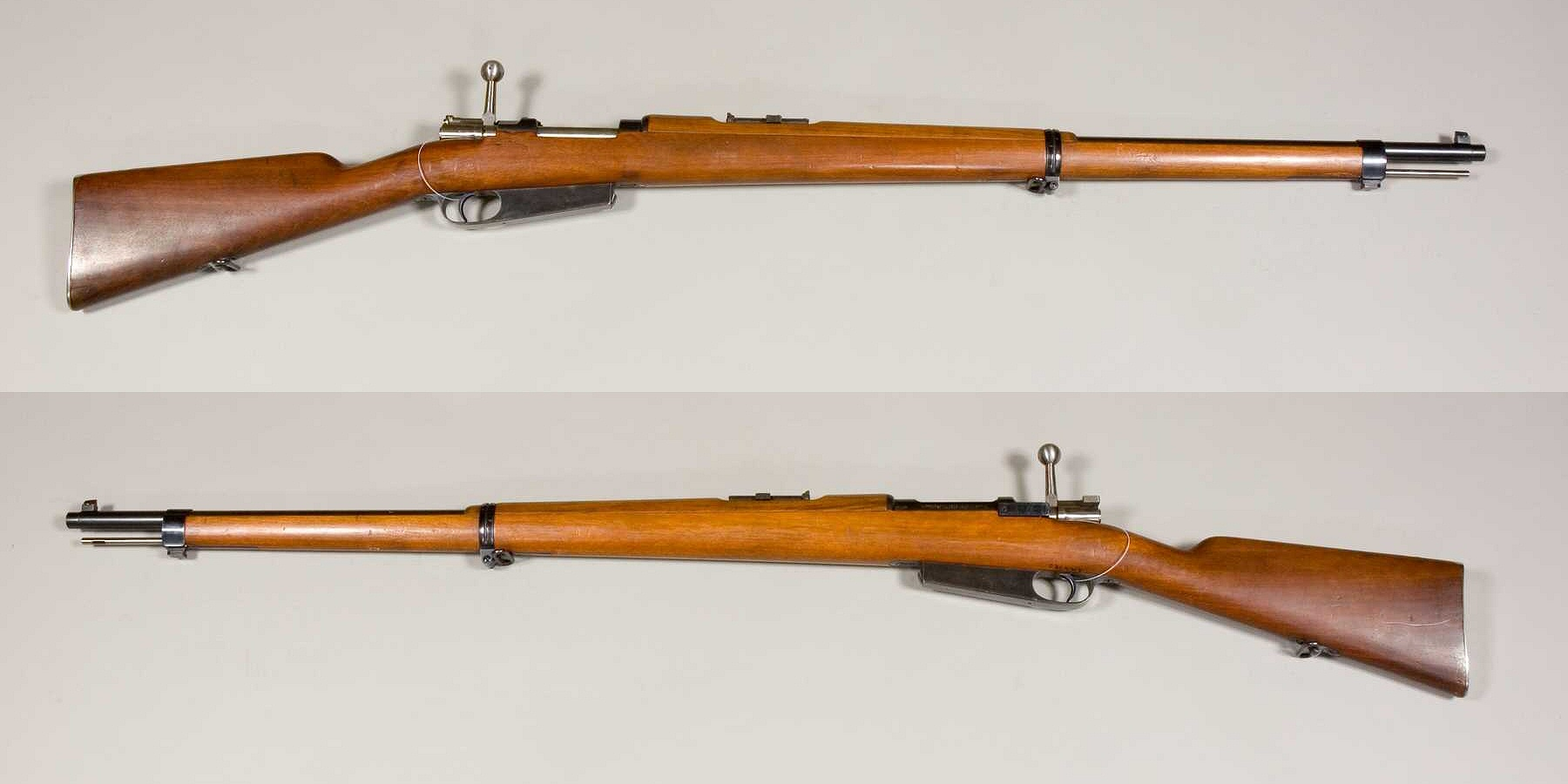
The Mauser M1892

Mauser's design work produced the Model 1892, a transitional design that was manufactured in limited numbers for the Spanish Army. Between 5,000 and 8,000 of the rifles were built for Spain. At the same time, Mauser developed the 7×57mm Mauser cartridge for the Spanish Army, which adopted the round the following year for the M1892 rifles. The M1892 rifle introduced a number of innovations to remedy the problems of the earlier rifles, including the large non-rotating claw extractor on the bolt, which prevented double-feeds. The magazine box and trigger guard were machined as a single piece, preventing the box from being removed and lost, though the magazine was still a single-stack design that extended below the bottom of the stock. The stripper clips and the clip guides were improved to make them easier to use. Other internal changes were made to simplify the action and increase its reliability and safety, including alterations to the sear to prevent it from releasing the firing pin if the bolt was not fully in battery.

Spain placed an order for 20,000 of the M1892 rifles on 21 July 1893, with a further 10,000 added on 27 August, but the design quickly led to an improved version, the Model 1893, which replaced the M1892s ordered. The new M1893 version incorporated a staggered 5-round magazine that did not extend below the bottom of the stock. This was the first time a Mauser rifle included a fully contained magazine. Apart from a redesigned receiver to fit the wider magazine, the action of the M1893 was essentially identical to the M1892. The Spanish Army adopted the M1893 on 7 December 1893. For his work in developing such an effective rifle, Mauser received the Grand Cross of the Order of Military Merit from the Spanish government.

== Description ==
Illustration of the Model 1893 action

Illustration of the Mauser bolt

The M1893 was manufactured in two variants for Spain, a standard rifle with a 29.06-inch (738 mm) barrel and a short carbine with a 21.75-inch (552 mm) barrel. According to historian John Walter, however, the short version might have been an experimental design only. Both of these variants were chambered in the 7 mm caliber developed by Mauser, and the barrel had 4-groove rifling with a right-hand twist. The rifling twist rate was 1 revolution in 8.68 inches (220 mm). The 7 mm ammunition was fired at a muzzle velocity of 2,330 feet per second (710 m/s) from the standard rifle-length barrel. The rifle weighed 8.8 pounds (4.0 kg), while the carbine weighed about 8.3 pounds (3.8 kg). Another variant, built for the Ottoman Army, had the same 29.06-inch barrel as the Spanish rifle, but it was chambered in the slightly larger 7.65×53mm Mauser round. The Ottoman variant weighed about 9 pounds (4.1 kg).

The receiver for all versions of the rifle and the one-piece bolt were forged steel. The receivers had guides for stripper clips milled into the bridge for increased reliability, though the rifles could also be loaded individually. Most bolts featured a straight handle with a rounded grasping knob, though the short rifles were fitted with bolts that had turned down handles. As was standard for Mauser rifles, the M1893 was configured with a three-position safety that locked the action or allowed the bolt to be worked but with a disabled firing pin, in addition to the fire setting. The safety could only be applied while the action was cocked. The bolt was a cock on close design, and locked with a pair of forward locking lugs; unlike later Mauser designs, it did not include a third, rear locking lug, which was introduced with the Model 1895. The forward receiver ring diameter were the two forward locking lugs achieved lockup is 33 millimetres (1.30 in). As a result, the bolt was not as strong as later designs. The M1893 magazine included a bolt stop, which prevented the bolt from being closed on an empty magazine, thus indicating to the soldier that the rifle was empty. To close the bolt with an empty magazine, the follower had to be depressed to clear the bolt stop.

The iron sights included a tangent V-notch rear sight that was graduated from 400 meters (1,300 ft) to 2,000 m (6,600 ft). Later rifles, manufactured from May 1906 onward, received a modernized rear sight, and a third version of the rear sight was adopted in 1913 after an improved 7 mm round, which had the significantly higher muzzle velocity of 2,790 feet per second (850 m/s), was adopted. The barreled receiver was fitted with a wood stock with a straight grip. The stock was attached to the barrel with two barrel bands, the forward-most of which also included a bayonet lug for the rifle variant, while the short carbine did not receive the bayonet lug. Each rifle was issued with an M1893 sword bayonet.

=== Derivatives ===
In 1894, Mauser designed a new version of the rifle, designated the Model 1894, chambered in 6.5×55mm for the Swedish Army. Further alterations of the basic M1893 design produced the Model 1895, which was chambered in 7 mm and sold in large quantities to Central and South American countries, including Chile, El Salvador, Honduras, Uruguay, and Mexico. The M1895 was also sold to China, Luxembourg, and Persia. Spain also acquired a variant of the M1895 that was essentially identical to the M1893 series with the exception of its 17.5-inch (440 mm) barrel.

The design was refined further into the Model 1896, which was sold to Sweden and the Boer states, the latter placed into very effective use during the Second Boer War of 1899–1902. The Mauser action was further refined in 1898 with the version that was adopted in Germany as the Gewehr 98, which proved to be the most influential of all bolt-action rifles of its time, leading to various military rifles like the German Karabiner 98k, Czech vz. 24, and the Yugoslav M24 series. The Mauser M98 action is still copied in modern, commercial hunting rifle designs.

== History ==
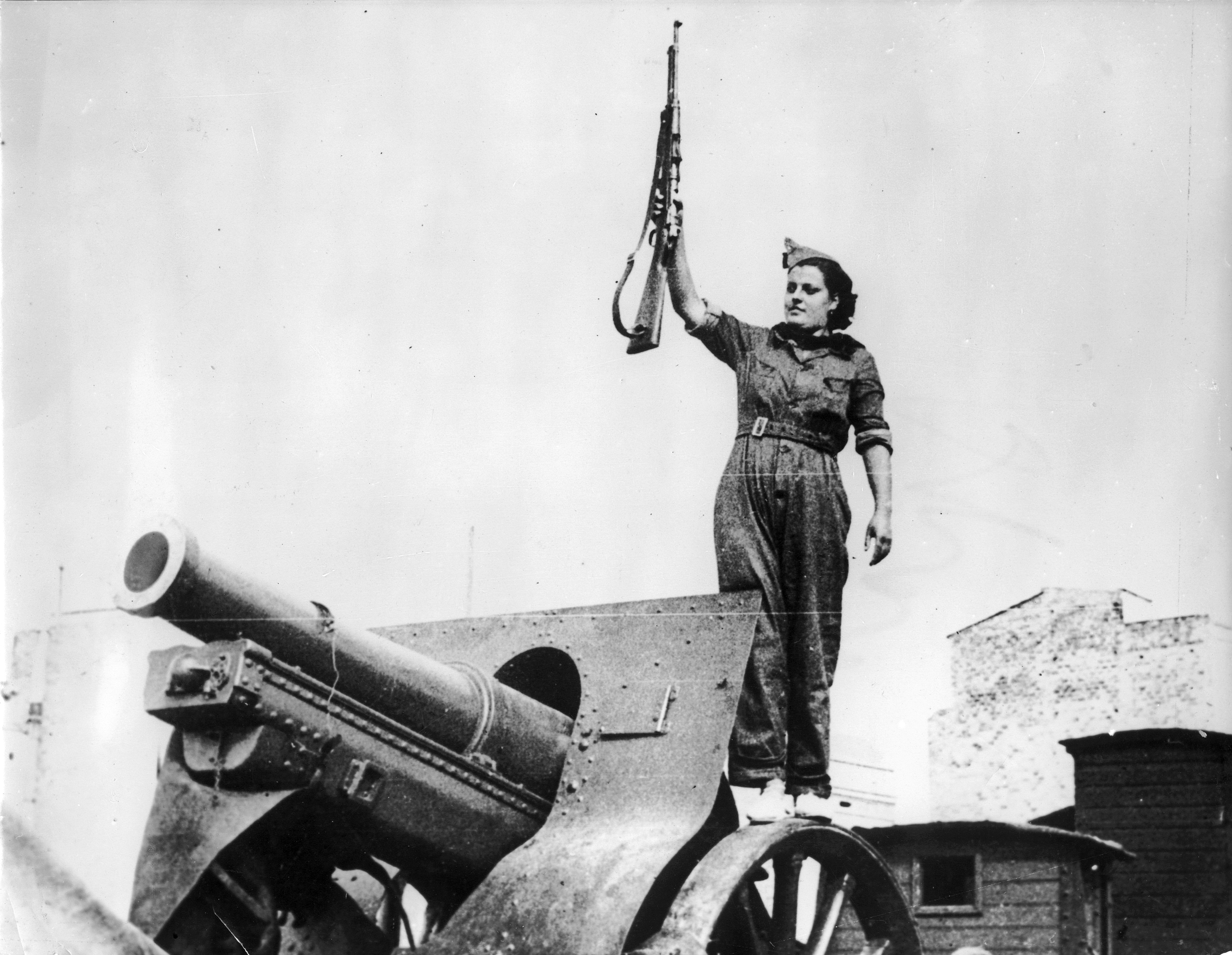
A combatant during the Spanish Civil War holding a Spanish-made Model 1916 short rifle, a derivative of the Model 1893 rifle

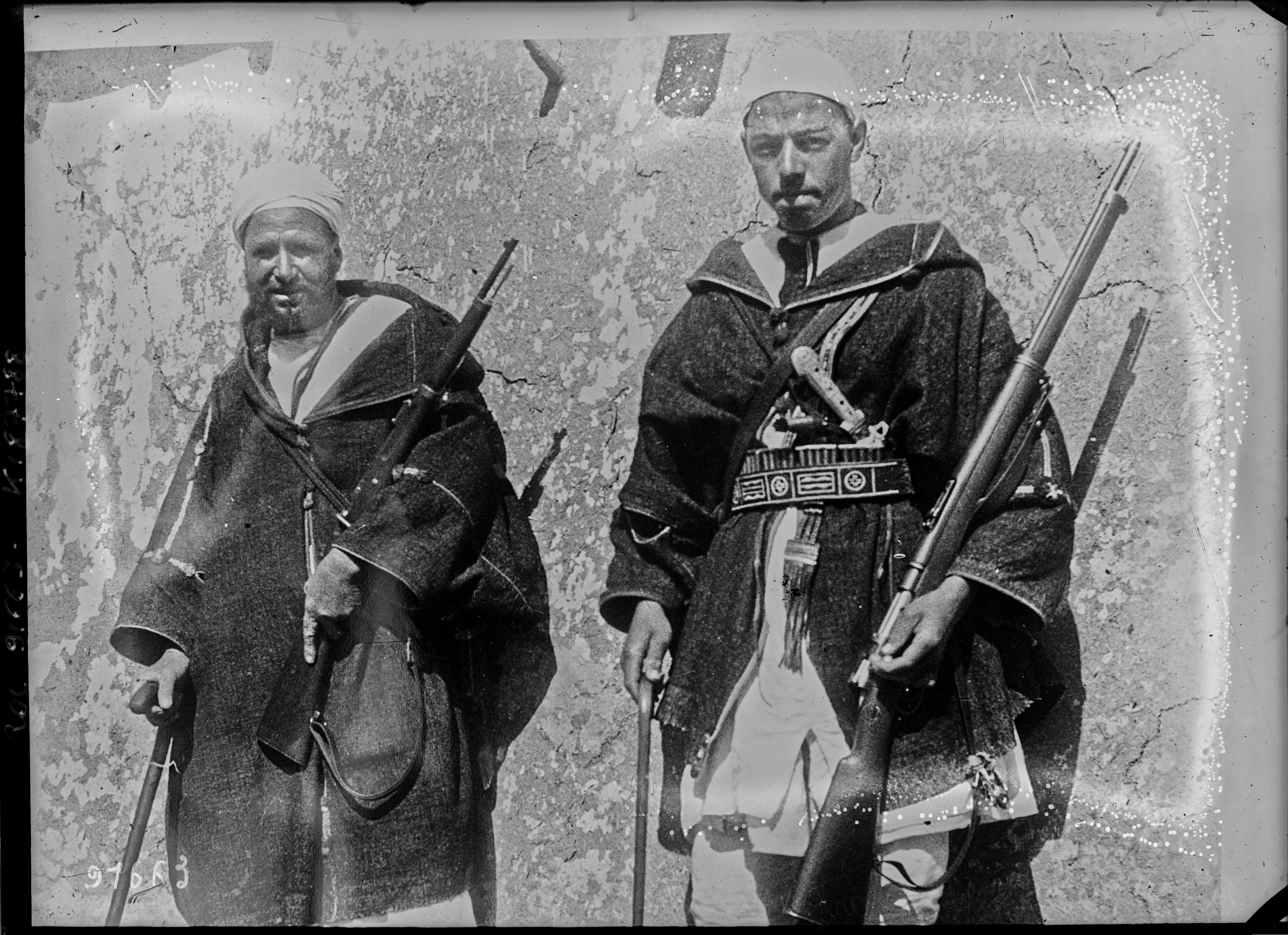
Berbers carrying captured rifles, including a M1893 and a French Berthier carbine

In addition to Mauser, the Spanish 1893 rifles were manufactured under license by a variety of other firms, including Ludwig Loewe & Company (and its successor, Deutsche Waffen und Munitionsfabriken) of Germany, Fabrique Nationale of Belgium, and Fábrica de Armas and Industrias de Guerra de Cataluna of Spain. A total of 206,830 rifles were manufactured in Germany for Spain by 1899, and from 1896 to 1943, Spanish arsenals manufactured more than 2 million of the rifles including all variants. Over the course of Spanish Mauser production, Fábrica de Armas built some 500,000 M1893 rifles at its factory in Oviedo, along with 850,000 M1895s and 325,000 of the modernized Model 1916 rifles.

The 1893 Mauser was used by the Spanish Army in Cuba against US and Cuban insurrectionist forces and in the Philippines against the Philippine Republican Army and US forces during the Spanish–American War in 1898. It gained a deadly reputation particularly from the Battle of San Juan Hill, where only 750 Spanish regulars significantly delayed the advance of 8,500 US troops armed with a mix of outclassed .30–40 Krag–Jørgensen bolt-action rifles and older single-shot, breech-loading Trapdoor Springfield rifles, inflicting 1,400 American casualties. The use of smokeless powder gave the Spanish a major advantage over the single-shot, black powder Springfield that was issued to many United States troops. The Mauser's 7mm cartridge gave some 300 ft/s (91 m/s) higher velocity and a resultant flatter trajectory over the .30 Army cartridge used in the Krag–Jørgensen rifle. This extended the effective range of Spanish defensive fire. In addition, the higher velocity gave the 7 mm Mauser significantly greater penetrating capability than the .30-40. The M93's stripper clip system allowed the Spaniards to reload far more quickly than could be done with the Krag, whose magazine had to be loaded one round at a time. A United States Army board of investigation was commissioned as a direct result of this battle. They recommended replacement of the Krag. By 1903, American authorities had adopted the M1903 Springfield, which copied the 1898 Mauser's bolt and magazine systems, along with a higher-velocity .30 caliber cartridge, the .30-03 (which was later replaced by the more potent .30-06 Springfield).

Spain remained neutral during World War I, but Model 1893 Mausers saw extensive service with both regular troops and the Spanish Legion during the Rif War of 1920–1927 against Moroccan rebels. The rifles were still in service during the Spanish Civil War of 1936–1939 on both sides of the conflict. Many of the Model 1893 rifles were modernized during the war. The 7 mm chambered Mausers were replaced in Spanish service in 1943 by the Spanish M43, a derivative of the German Karabiner 98k, chambered in the more powerful 7.92×57mm Mauser cartridge, though the M1893 and M1916 versions of the rifles remained in service in various capacities into the 1950s. They were still the standard rifle of some Spanish units during the Ifni War, the rifle being also used by their opponents of the Moroccan Army of Liberation. Some of the M1916 guns were modernized in the 1950s and served even longer, though the widespread development of semi-automatic rifles after World War II quickly rendered the Mausers suitable only for second-line duties.

Between 1894 and 1899, Mauser manufactured approximately 201,100 of the M1893 rifles for the Ottoman Empire. The Ottoman Army did not widely issue the rifle to its troops, or indeed train those who were equipped with it. During the Greco-Turkish War of 1897, only about a tenth of Ottoman soldiers were equipped with the rifle, with the remainder carrying obsolescent Snider–Enfields and Martini–Henrys. Many of the M1893s (and other models of modern rifles) acquired by the Ottoman Army were kept in government arsenals rather than issued to soldiers. The same remained true in the Balkan Wars of 1912–1913. Ottoman soldiers, who were typically familiar with old muzzle-loading rifles, frequently had trouble operating the rifle. The rifles continued on in Ottoman service through World War I.

A slightly modified M1893 rifle were also sold to Brazil, chambered in 7 mm and designated M1894. Produced in long rifle and carbine version, it was used during the War of Canudos in 1897 and later during the Contestado War and the Constitutionalist Revolution alongside the Mauser Model 1908. Moreover, some M1893 long rifles and cavalry carbines in 7.65 mm were made at Fabrique Nationale for the Belgian Gendarmerie, the Garde Civique and the Congo Free State after 1894.

== Variants ==
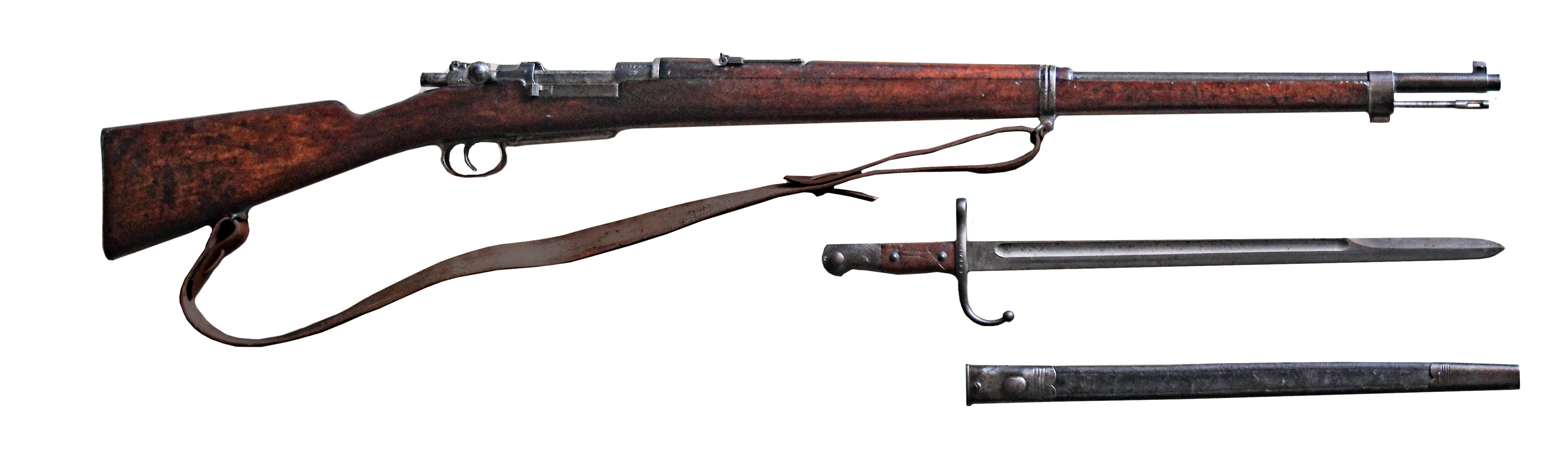
Ottoman contract Mauser M1893, with M1890 bayonet and scabbard. You can see the magazine cut-off right under the rifle's bolt.

=== Ottoman variant ===
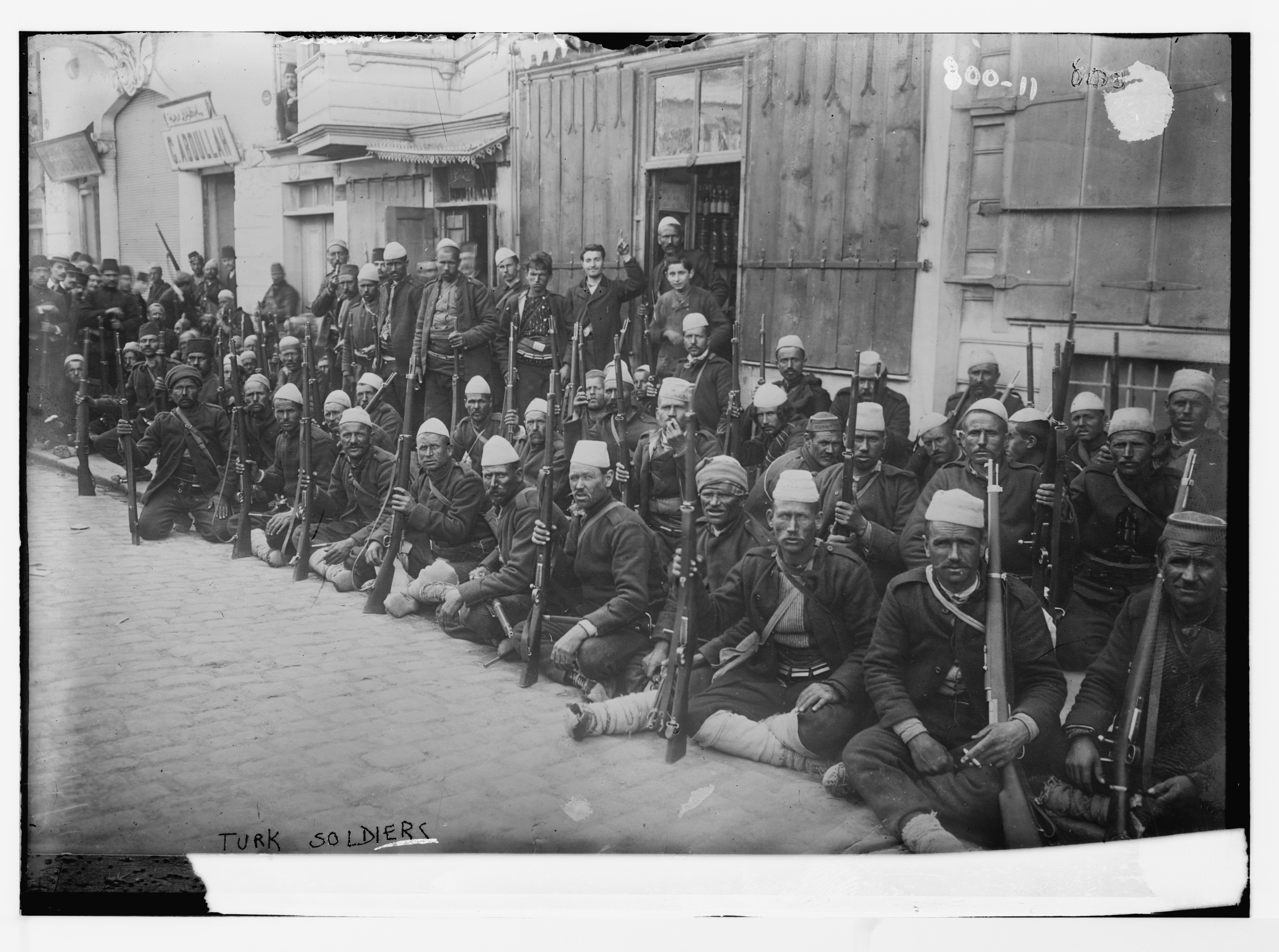
Turkish soldiers with Model 1893 rifles, circa 1914

The Ottoman government was the earliest and most important foreign buyer of Mauser Oberndorf, since they ordered 500,000 rifles in 1887. In April 1893, while this previous contract was being completed, Mauser offered the Sultan the new 1892/93 pattern being developed with the Spanish army. The new 1893 Mauser rifle, showing several upgrades compared to their previously purchased Mauser Mod. 1890, immediately convinced the Sultan Abdul Hamid II to order 200,100 rifles, completed by March 1896. This was followed in August 1896 by another smaller order of 1,800 guns, delivered by December.

Despite many sources claiming the Ottoman contract being inspired by the Spanish adoption, it actually was an almost simultaneous contract, with the Ottomans already being offered by Mauser the 1893 pattern of rifles by Mauser in April 1893, while Spain was still ordering 1892 patterns in July. The two countries formally adopted the rifle around the same time in December 1893.

Ottoman 1893 rifles were chambered for the 7.65×53mm Mauser cartridge and were identical to the Spanish adopted model, except for a magazine cut-off, which when engaged permitted the feeding and extraction of single cartridges only while keeping the cartridges in the magazine in reserve, and a cylindrical bolt. The bayonet lug fit the M1890 Bayonet, which the Ottomans had already acquired in large numbers for their previous contract. In 1910–1912, all the rifles in service were updated with a new rear sight to calibrate the rifle for the new Spitzer bullets adopted.

After World War I, most of these rifles still in Turkish hands were re-barreled and converted to fire the far more common and powerful 7.92×57mm Mauser after the Turkish Army adopted that caliber.

=== Spanish Model 1895 carbine ===
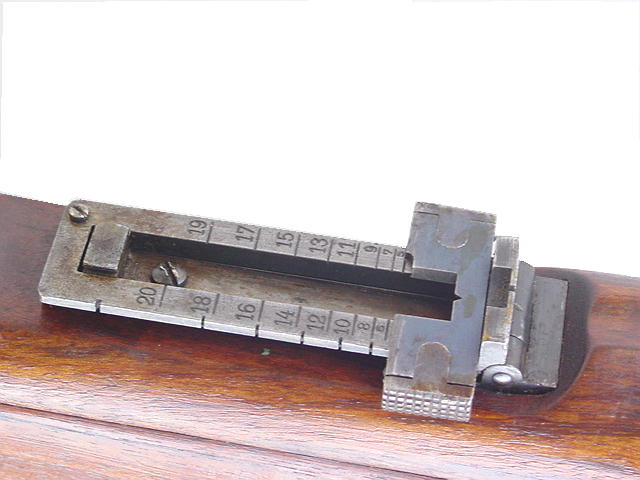
1893–1895 Mauser rear sights

The Spanish Army adopted the Model 1895 carbine on 7 May 1895; the rifle was essentially a shortened M1893, with a full-length stock that ran to the muzzle. Though the carbine bears the 1895 designation, it did not include the improvements made in the M1895, and was essentially just a shortened M1893. It received the 1895 designation as the Spanish Army did not approve the carbine for service until that year. Ludwig Loewe manufactured around 22,500 of the M1895 carbines between 1896 and 1897 before licensing production to Fábrica de Armas, which built an unknown number of the rifles between 1898 and 1915, when production changed over to the Model 1916 short rifle.

The carbine had an overall length of 37.4 inches (950 mm), with a 17.55-inch (446 mm) barrel and a stock that extended to the end of the barrel. The carbine weighed 7 to 7.5 pounds (3.2 to 3.4 kg) empty. The M1895 carbine also differed in some minor details, including the rear sight, which was graduated only to 1,400 meters (4,600 ft), and the bolt handle, which was turned down. Since the carbine was intended to be used by cavalry, it used a single, large lanyard loop on the bottom of the wrist instead of traditional sling loops. In 1896, the design was modified slightly, to add a sling ring to the barrel band and a sling bracket in the left side of the butt. Unlike on the longer rifles, the upper barrel band did not include a bayonet lug. The left side of the rear of the receiver was cut down to facilitate the use of stripper clips.

=== Spanish Model 1913 short rifle ===
The Model 1913 short rifle was an experimental development to replace the M1895, though it was identical to the M1895 in most respects. The short rifle was slightly shorter than the carbine, at 37.2 in (940 mm) overall, though it was slightly heavier, at 7.12 pounds (3.23 kg) empty. It retained the same length barrel and the same action, but unlike the M1895, the forward barrel band incorporated a bayonet lug for the M1893 sword bayonet. The rifle was issued in small numbers for field trials beginning in 1914, but they were soon superseded by the Model 1916 short rifle. Surviving M1913s were issued to buglers in cavalry squadrons beginning on 2 April 1918.

=== Spanish Model 1916 short rifle ===
The Model 1916 rifle was adopted on 14 November 1916 to replace the M1895 carbine, the short barrels of which were not optimized to take advantage of the higher velocity of the M1913 cartridge. Like the M1913, the left rear of the receiver was cut to facilitate stripper clip loading, though it was cut fully flush with the stock. Gas escape holes were added to the bolt and to the receiver to vent excess gas in the event of a case failure. Also like the M1913, the M1916 rifle had a bent bolt handle, a full-length stock with a lug for an M1913 sword bayonet. Beginning in 1913, large sight protectors were added to the front sight. These rifles featured a 21.75-inch (552 mm) barrel, though a carbine version was also manufactured with a 17.7-inch (450 mm) barrel, though this may have been an experimental version. The M1916 was manufactured by Fábrica de Armas from 1916 to 1951 and Industrias de Guerra de Cataluna from 1936 to 1939.

Starting in 1943, many of the M1916 rifles were converted to fire the larger and more powerful 7.92×57mm Mauser cartridge, which Spain had adopted that year with the M43 rifle. Some of these guns received new stocks with pistol grips and finger grooves in the fore end. In the 1950s, many of the M1893 and M1916 rifles were converted to accept the 7.62×51mm NATO round. These rifles retained their original furniture and fittings, though some were converted further to the FR7 standard, which received cut down stocks, a shorter 18.5-inch (470 mm) barrel, and more modern aperture sights. Both versions of the re-barreled rifles were employed for military training and Guardia Civil use, along with the similarly converted FR8, which was based on the M43 action.

== Users ==
- Belgium
- First Brazilian Republic
- Congo Free State
- Honduras: A number of 1893s were bought at the beginning of the 20th century, possibly those were captured rifles from the Spanish-American War sold by Bannerman
- Ottoman Empire
- First Philippine Republic
- Spain
