= Mauser Model 1889 =

German-Belgian bolt-action rifle

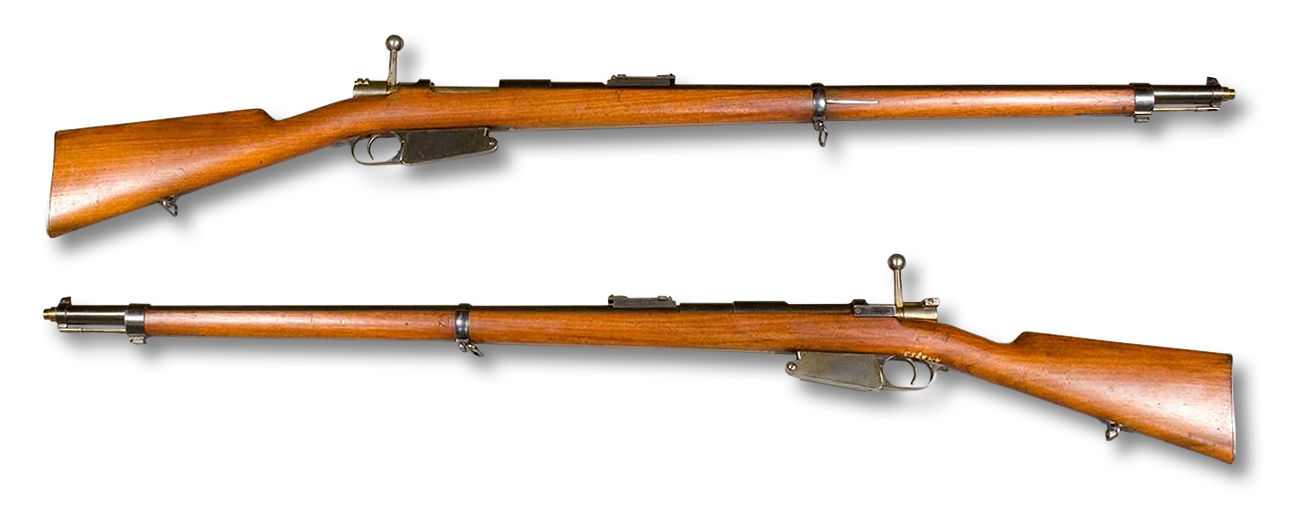
- Belgian Mauser 1889
- Type: Bolt-action rifle
- Place of origin: German Empire; Belgium

Service history
- In service: 1889–1960s
- Used by: See Users
- Wars: First Melillan campaign War of Canudos (limited); Greco-Turkish War (1897); Spanish–American War; Acre War; Belgian colonial conflicts First Balkan War; World War I Greco-Turkish War; Turkish War of Independence; Chaco War; World War II; Congo Crisis; Cyprus crisis of 1963–64

Production history
- Designer: Mauser
- Designed: 1889
- Manufacturer: Fabrique Nationale; Loewe Berlin; Deutsche Waffen und Munitionsfabriken
- No. built: ~275,000
- Variants: Belgian Mauser rifle M1889; Turkish Mauser rifle M1890; Argentinean Mauser rifle M1891; Belgian Mauser cavalry carbine M1889; Belgian Mauser Engineer carbine M1889; Argentinean Mauser cavalry carbine M1891; Argentinean Mauser Engineer carbine M1891

Specifications
- Mass: Mauser Model 1889: 4 kg (8.82 lb); Cavalry Carbine: 3.3 kg (7.3 lb); Engineer Carbine: 3.3 kg (7.3 lb)
- Length: Mauser Model 1889: 1,295 mm (51.0 in); Cavalry Carbine: 940 mm (37 in); Engineer Carbine: 940 mm (37 in)
- Barrel length: Mauser Model 1889: 780 mm (31 in); Cavalry Carbine: 447 mm (17.6 in); Engineer Carbine: 447 mm (17.6 in)
- Cartridge: 7.65×53mm Mauser; 7.92×57mm Mauser
- Caliber: 7.65mm
- Action: Bolt-action
- Muzzle velocity: 2,100 ft/s (640 m/s)
- Feed system: 5-round detachable box magazine
- Sights: Iron sights adjustable to 1,900 m (2,100 yd)

The Mauser Model 1889 is a bolt-action rifle of Belgian origin. It became known as the 1889 Belgian Mauser, 1890 Turkish Mauser, and 1891 Argentine Mauser.

== History ==
After the Mauser brothers finished work on the Model 71/84 in 1880, the design team set out to create a small caliber repeater that used smokeless powder. Because of setbacks brought on by Wilhelm Mauser's death, they failed to have the design completed by 1882, so the German Rifle Test Commission (German: Gewehr-Prüfungskommission) was formed. The commission preferred to create their own design. Paul Mauser, who was not aware of the commission's work until 1888, managed to sell an improved version of his M1871/84 rifles as M1887 to the Ottoman Empire.

Meanwhile, in the mid-1880s, Belgium wanted to adopt a magazine rifle to replace the Albini-Braendlin, Terssen and Comblain 11-mm single-shots. In 1886, Manufacture d’Armes de L’État started trials of several mostly foreign designs (including Kropatchek and Jarmann) of which the M1885 Remington–Lee won, but was considered too complicated to be adopted. Thus, they had to run a second round of trials, of which Mannlicher M1886 would be the winner.

However in 1887, the characteristics of Poudre B smokeless powder and revolutionary smallbore 8×50mmR Lebel cartridge became public. Consequently, all black powder rifles became obsolescent. The next year, the Belgians tried a smokeless 8-mm cartridge (still with a rim), of which not much detail is known. A Mannlicher rifle in 8 mm with 1887 Belgian proof marks survived (it may have been a prototype for the Mannlicher M1888).

Since every participant needed to work out the kinks of using smokeless powder, the next round of trials didn't start in Beverloo until July 1888: Mannlicher, Nagant, Pieper and Schulhoff participated but the results were inconclusive.

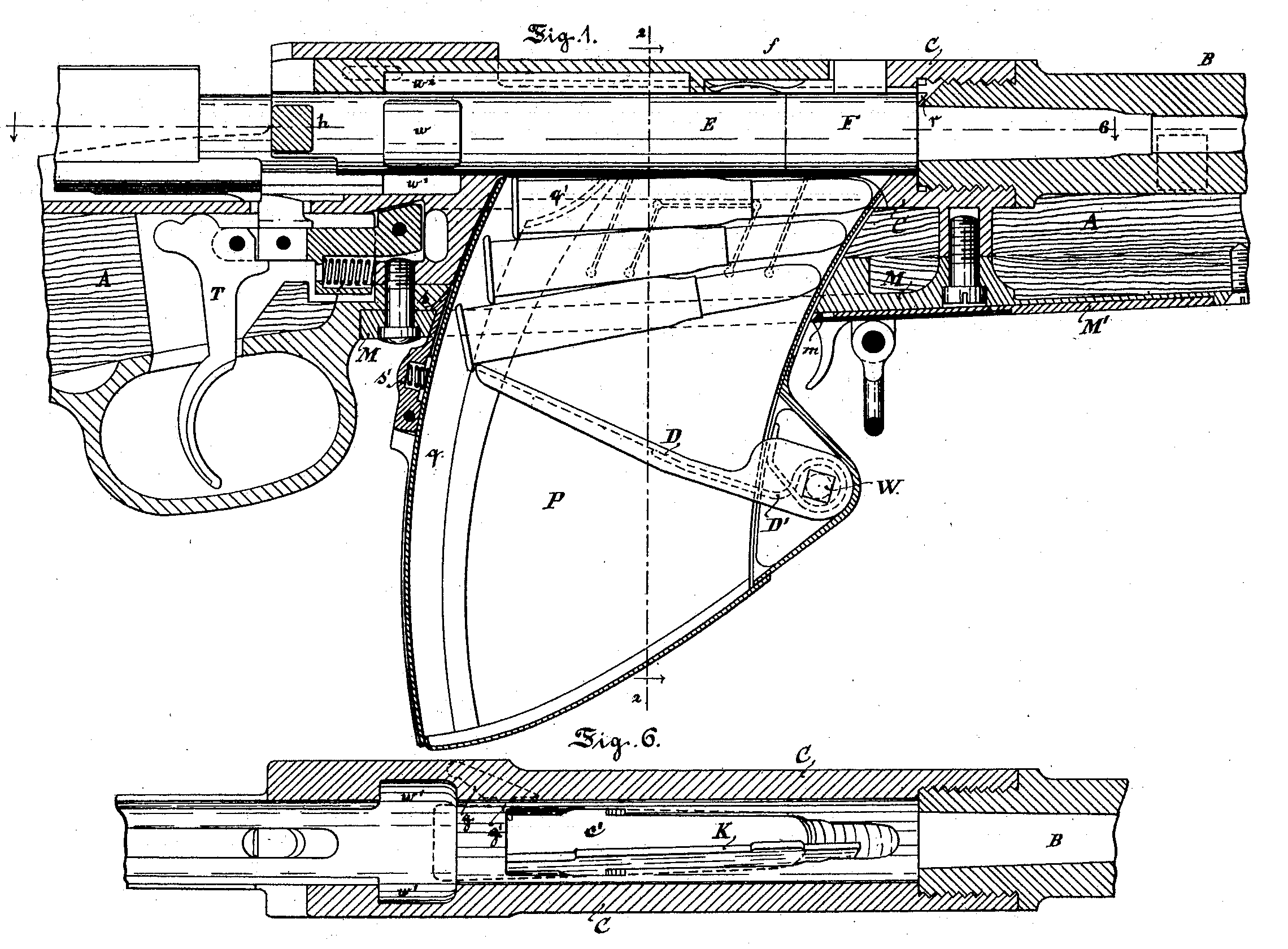
Cutaway of an 1888 design with a detachable magazine for 9 rimmed rounds from his US patent

Paul Mauser didn't participate in the aforementioned rounds of the Belgian trials, but as soon as he was aware of the Kommissionsgewehr rifle, he started developing a new one. He patented a rear-locked bolt design somewhat similar to a Lee action in February 1888 and a detachable magazine in April 1888 (shown to the left).

He also sent a similar but not identical experimental rifle now known as "Mauser-Metford" to Great Britain, which was also adopting a small-bore cartridge (.303 Rubini, yet to become .303 British) rifle at the time. This was to no avail because it was too late (since December 1887 they already started the final troop trials of the future Lee-Metford, the pattern of which was sealed in November 1888 after minor tweaks).

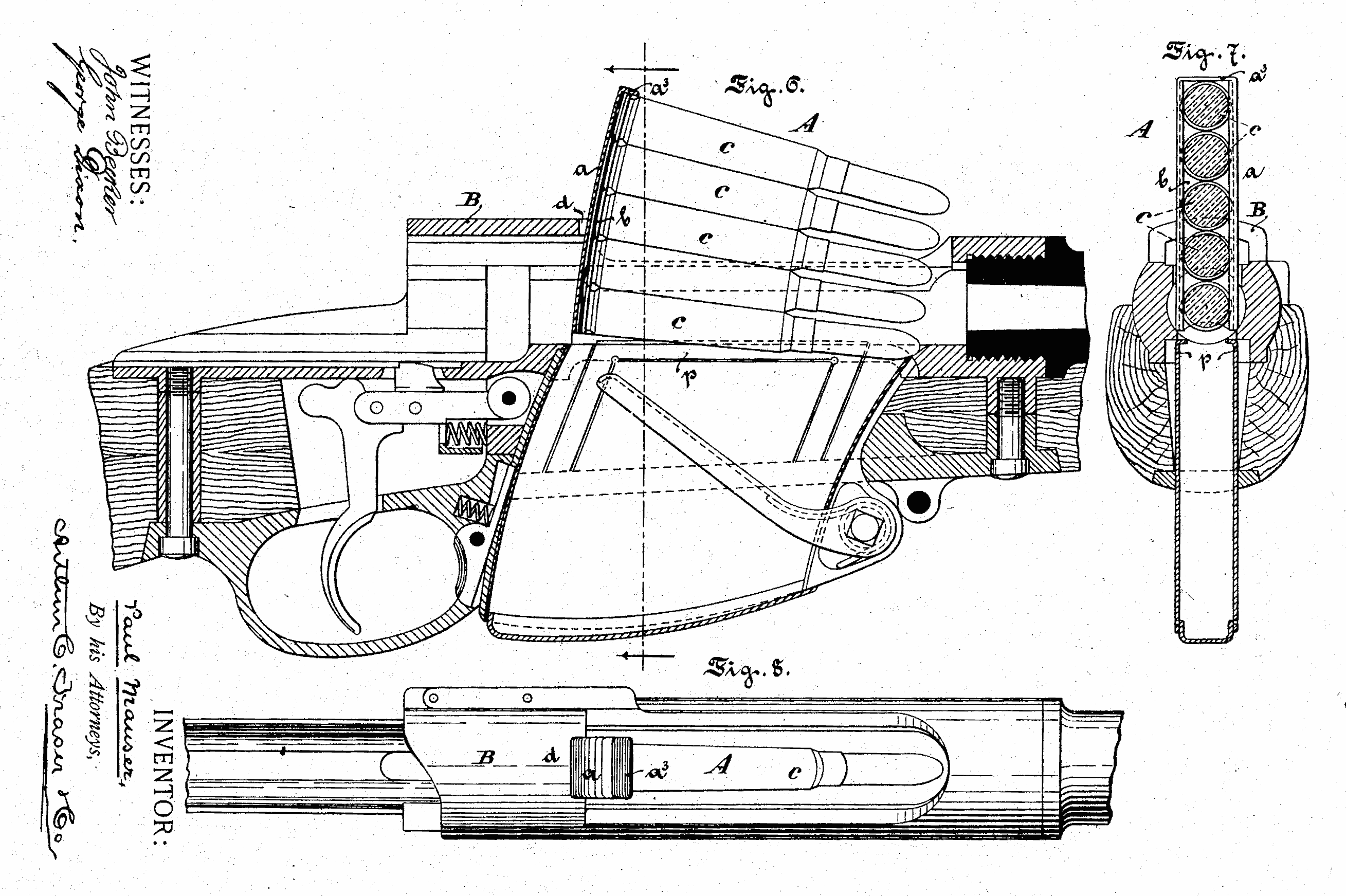
Transitional rear-locked design from the M1888 to the Belgian-adopted M1889, shown on Mauser's US patent on stripper clips

In September 1888 Mauser filed a British patent on the stripper clips and test-fired an experimental rifle with the feature. The idea was not unknown and in fact a similar design was patented by a US inventor in 1878, but it was Mauser who managed to commercialize the idea. The design was adapted to a 7,65 mm rimless cartridge Mauser derived from the Patrone 88 developed at the Spandau Arsenal.

The next round of Belgian trials was held under General van der Smissen in October-December 1888 with five participants, all but Mauser using 8 mm caliber: Mannlicher, Nagant, Pieper, Mauser and Engh (also known as Liégeoise by its manufacturer). Even though Mauser's rifle was included in the trio of best performers, along with Mannlicher and Engh, it suffered from one or several malfunctions, details of which differ in various sources:

- according to a modern source, a cartridge reportedly ruptured, damaging the bolt face and the extractor, and Mauser himself blamed faulty ammunition;
- according to a 1888 French source, extraction of empty cases became difficult in the end of the trials, and Mauser blamed imperfectly obturating cartridges which clogged the bolt with soot from the firing;
- according to a 1889 Russian source, the rear-locking bolt was consistently deforming under high pressure from the new cartridge, forcing Mauser to develop front-locking lugs.

After the trials Mauser chose to move the locking lugs to the front of the bolt like on the Komissionsgewehr, despite the added cost in manufacturing. This was done in order to prevent the receiver now opened-up from the top for more practical stripper clip reloading from compressing with firing, and to prevent the receiver from stretching.

The last round of Beverloo trials with reportedly 24 participants (including Nagant, Schulhof, Marga, Mannlicher, and Engh) began in May 1889 and continued into the summer. The trials finished in August, Mauser won over the Mannlicher-derived design and a Nagant, and the rifle was adopted on October 23, 1889, with some changes to the form of the safety, tweaks to the sights, and lengthening the barrel.

=== Mauser 1889 ===
Belgian soldiers using Model 1889 rifles in 1915.

To compete for Belgian trials, several Belgian arms manufacturers funded the Fabrique Nationale d'Armes de Guerre, now known as FN Herstal.

FN's factory was overrun during World War I, so they outsourced production to a facility in Birmingham, England and Hopkins & Allen in the United States. The Birmingham factory was originally set up by the well-known gunmaking firm W. W. Greener, and was subsequently handed over to the Belgian Government later in the war. Many Belgian Model 1889 rifles were captured by the Imperial German Army, and some were modified to fire the 7.92×57mm Mauser cartridge. Paraguay purchased 7,000 Belgian Model 1889s in 1930.

Rifles captured by Nazi Germany after 1940 were designated Gewehr 261 (b) (Mle 1889 rifle), Karabiner 451 (b) (Mle 1889 carbines), Karabiner 453 (b) (Mle 1916 carbine) and Gewehr 263 (b) (Mle 1889/36). Models 1889/36 were used by German second-line troops or pro-German organisations such as the Vlaamse Wacht. Some Model 1889/36 rifles were still in service in Belgian Congo at the time of independence of the Republic of the Congo-Léopoldville in 1960, and were used during the Congo Crisis.

==== Belgian variants ====
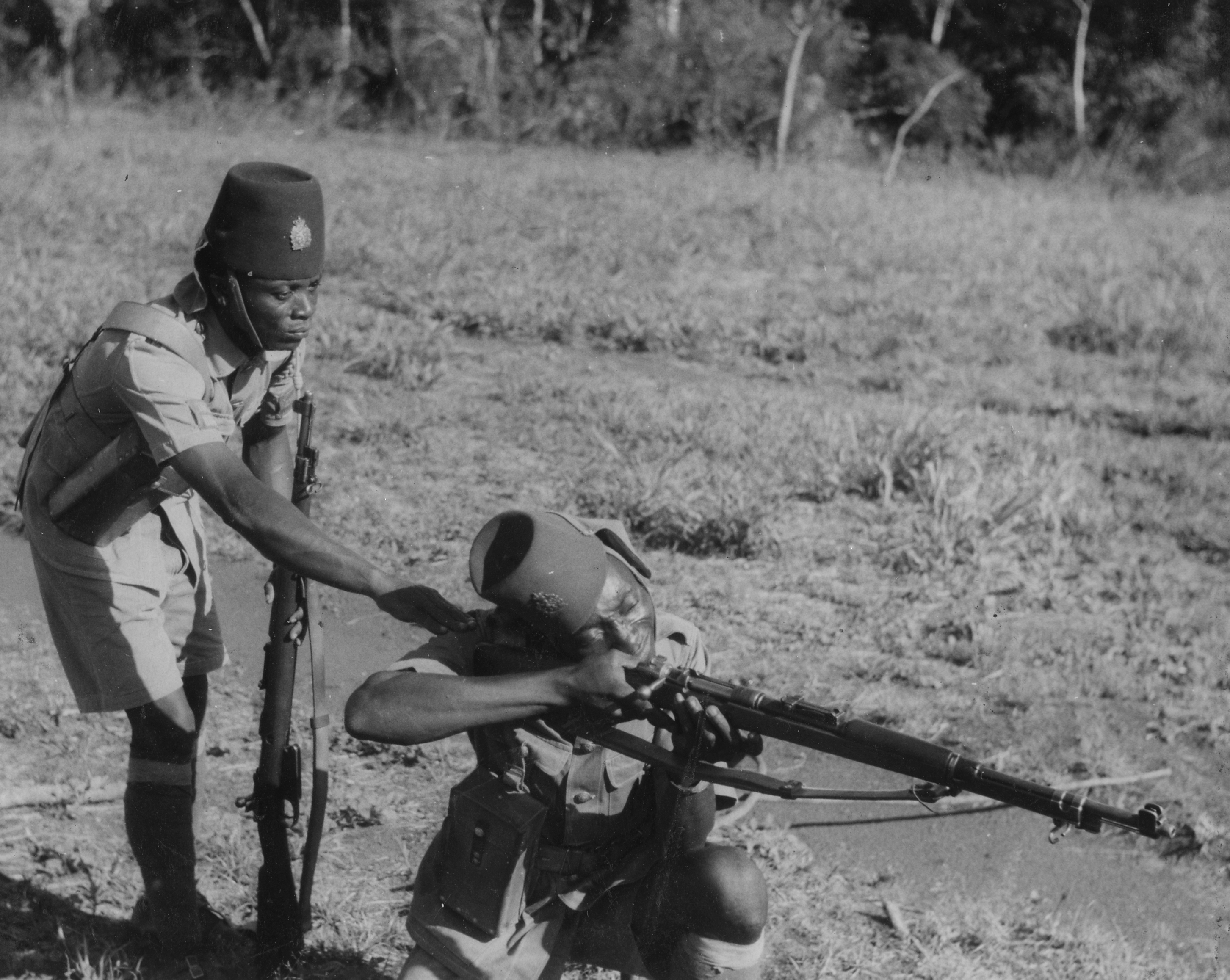
Two Force Publique soldiers wielding Model 1889/36 rifles, 1943

- Model 1889 Carbine with bayonet: With a standard bayonet.
- Model 1889 Carbine with Yatagan: With a yatagan-like bayonet, used by the Foot Gendarmerie and fortress artillery.
- Model 1889 Carbine with bayonet: Shorter variant, reconditioned during World War I, using the Gras bayonet.
- Model 1889 Carbine with bayonet: Shorter variant, with a long bayonet and heavier stock, used by the Mounted Gendarmerie.
- Model 1916 Carbine: Slightly modified Mle 1889 with Yatagan, to replace all the earlier models of carbines.
- Model 1889/36 Short Rifle or Model 1936: A modernized Model 1889 or Turkish Model 1890 with its bolt modified to cock on opening, and the barrel, barrel bands, front handguard, and sights of a Mauser Model 1935.

=== Mauser 1890 ===
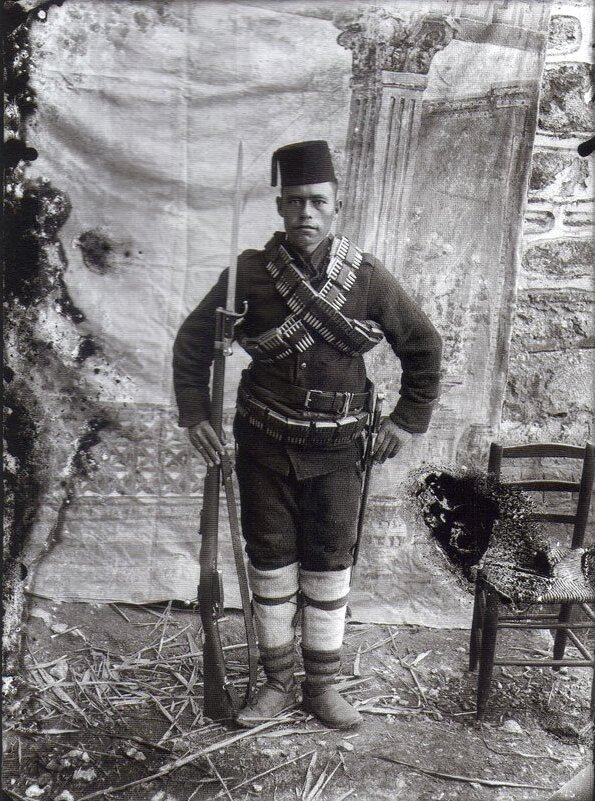
An Ottoman reservist with a M1890 rifle, c. 1912

The Belgian's talks with Mauser prompted the Ottoman Empire, whose contract for Model 1887 rifles included an "escape clause" allowing them to alter their order to account for any new advancements the Mauser brothers made, to reconsider the design. In the end, they ordered 280,000 pieces of an improved version of the 1889 Mauser known as the Turkish Model 1890 rifle. It used a slightly modified 7.65 round. A Model 1890 carbine was also supplied in smaller numbers. These rifles saw service during the First Balkan War and World War I. Large numbers of these rifles were captured by the British Army during World War I and sent to supply the Belgian Army. Mauser 1890 rifles were fielded by both Nationalist and Sultanate armies during the Turkish War of Independence. Some of these rifles were captured by Kurdish and Circassian rebels. In the 1950s, these rifles were still kept in reserve, but many of them were rebuilt and rechambered in 7.92×57mm during the 1930s. During the Cyprus crisis of 1963–64, old Mauser 1890 rifles were used by Turkish Cypriots.

The Royal Yugoslav Army received Turkish Mausers as war reparations. Some were used unmodified Puska M90 T and others were shortened as Puska M 03 T. Some of these rifles were captured by Nazi Germany and designated Gewehr 297 (j).

=== Mauser 1891 ===
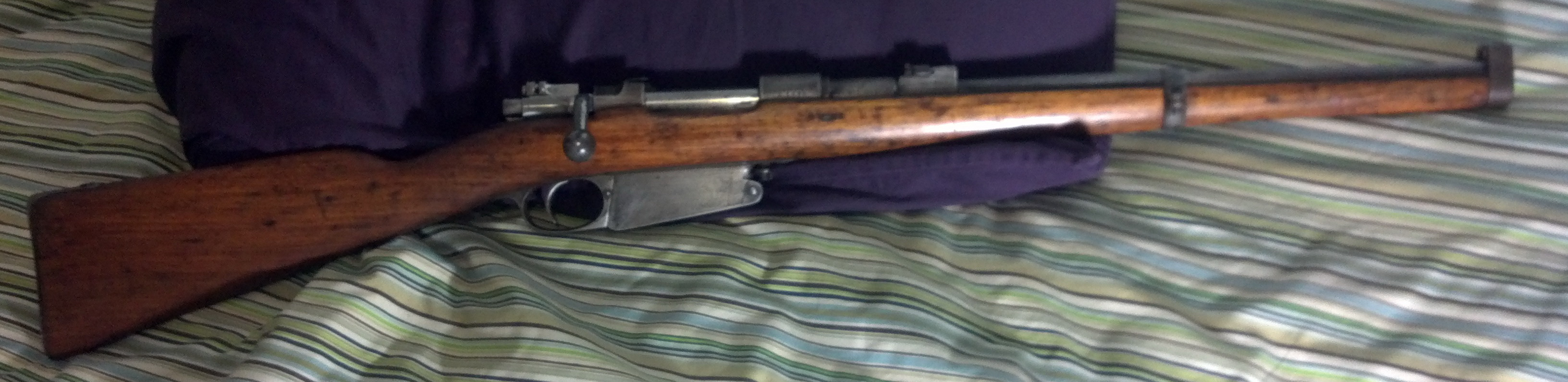
Argentine Mauser 1891 carbine

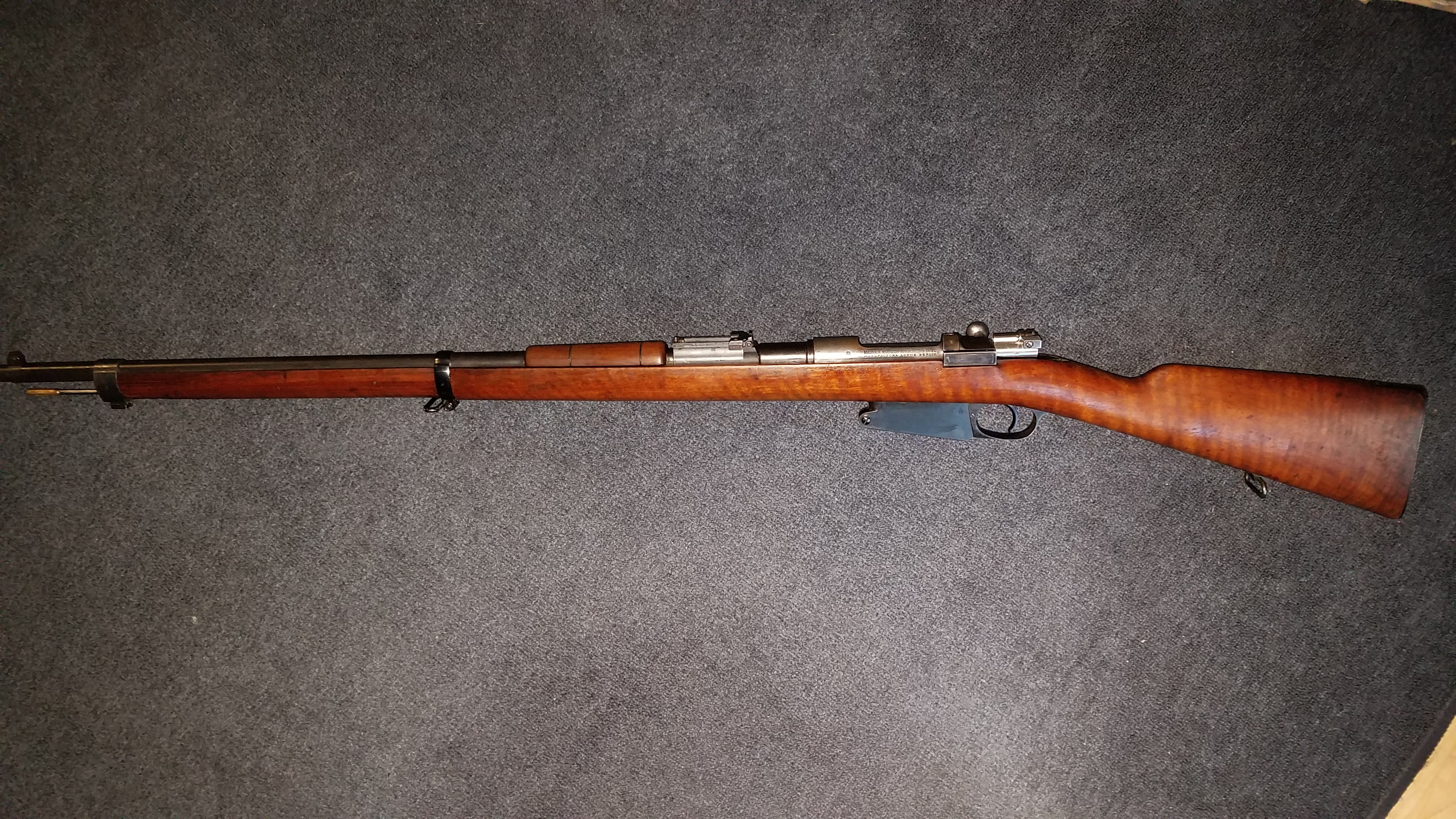
Argentine Mauser 1891

While this was taking place, the Argentine Small Arms Commission contacted Mauser in 1886 to replace their Remington Rolling Block rifles. 180,000 rifles and 30,000 carbines, all chambered in 7.65×53mm Mauser, were ordered. As with other early Mausers, the arms, designated Mauser Modelo 1891, were made by the Ludwig Loewe Company and Deutsche Waffen und Munitionsfabriken. Mauser 1891 carbines were still in service with the Argentine Police in the 1960s.

Bolivia bought 15,000 Argentine-made Modelo 1891s in the period between 1897 and 1901, and were designated Modelo 1895 (not to be confused with the Mauser Model 1895). They saw combat during the Chaco War. Argentine-made Mauser 1891s were also purchased by Colombia and Ecuador.

Peru bought several thousand of an identical rifle from the Ludwig Loewe Company, which became known as the Peruvian Model 1891.

Spain bought approximately 1,200 Mauser 1891 rifles and carbines in 7.65×53mm Mauser for trials. Eventually, the Kingdom adopted the Mauser Model 1893, firing the 7×57mm Mauser cartridge. In 1893, Spain bought several thousand Argentine Modelo 1891 rifles and carbines to quell the Melilla revolt in the Moroccan Rif. Later shipped to Cuba, the guns were captured in 1898 by the American forces at the end of the Spanish–American War.

== Features ==
A revolutionary new feature of the design was the ability to load the single-stack detachable box magazine that extended below the bottom of the stock with individual 7.65×53mm Mauser rounds by pushing the cartridges into the receiver top opening or via stripper clips. Each stripper clip can hold 5 rounds to fill the magazine and is inserted into clip guides machined into the rear receiver bridge. After loading, the empty clip is ejected when the bolt is closed. This was a significant improvement in an increase in rate of fire.

The high-performance smokeless powder bottlenecked 7.65×53mm Mauser cartridge became the second rimless cartridge adopted by a military.

One of the principal defining features of the Belgian Mauser was its thin sheet steel jacket surrounding the barrel—a rather unusual element not common to any other Mauser model of note. The jacket was instituted as a feature intended to maintain the effectiveness of the barrel and the solid wooden body over time, otherwise lengthening its service life and long-term accuracy when exposed to excessive firing and battlefield abuse. In spite of this approach, the jacketed barrel proved susceptible to moisture build-up and, therefore, introduced the problem of rust forming on the barrel itself–unknown to the user. In addition, the jacket was not perforated in any way to relieve the barrel of any heat build up, and consequently proved prone to denting. As such, barrel quality was affected over time regardless of the protective measure. Furthermore, another design flaw of the jacket was its extra steel content. Not only was it expensive, but it was also needed in huge quantities to provide for tens of thousands of soldiers. By many accounts, the barrel jacket was not appreciated by its operators who depended on a perfect rifle in conflict. Another defining characteristic, unlike most Mausers until then, was a cock-on-closing bolt action resembling that of the British Lee-Metford, which predates the Mauser 1889 by five years. This development allowed for faster firing and was well received.

The Model 1889 featured a single-piece solid wooden body running most of the length of the weapon, ending just aft of the muzzle. It contained two bands, and iron sights were fitted at the middle of the receiver top and at the muzzle like virtually all other rifles of the time. Overall length of the rifle was just over 50 inches (1,300 millimeters) with the barrel contributing to approximately 30 inches (760 millimeters) of this length. Of course, a fixed bayonet was issued and added another 10 inches (250 millimeters) to the design as doctrine of the period still relied heavily on the bayonet charge for defensive victory.

All variations used the same 7.65mm round-nosed cartridge. Many parts were interchangeable, with the exception of the bayonets of the 1889 and 1890/91 (the barrel shroud made the bayonet ring too wide).

== Users ==
- Argentina
- Belgium
- Brazil
- Bolivia
- Colombia
- Congo-Léopoldville
- Congo Free State White Officers, NCOs, and the Troupes de Katanga of the Force Publique
- Ecuador
- German Empire
- Nazi Germany
- Paraguay
- Peru
- Spain
- Ottoman Empire
  - Turkey
- Yugoslavia
- Luxembourg

== See also ==
- Belgian Mauser
- Turkish Mauser

== Bibliography ==
- Athanassiou, Phoebus (30 Nov 2017). Armies of the Greek-Italian War 1940–41. Men-at-Arms 514. Osprey Publishing. ISBN 9781472819178.
- Ball, Robert W. D. (2011). Mauser Military Rifles of the World. Iola: Gun Digest Books. ISBN 9781440228926.
- Smith, Joseph E. (1969). Small Arms of the World (11 ed.). Harrisburg, Pennsylvania: The Stackpole Company. ISBN 9780811715669.
- Smith, W.H.B. (1954). Mauser Rifles and Pistols (4 ed.). Harrisburg, Pennsylvania: The Stackpole Company.
- Vanderlinden, Anthony (2016). FN Mauser Rifles - Arming Belgium and the World. Wet Dog Publications. ISBN 978-0-9981397-0-8. Archived from the original on 2024-08-10.
- Webster, Colin (2003). Argentine Mauser Rifles 1871-1959. Schiffer Publishing, Limited. ISBN 0-7643-1868-3.
