= FN Model 24 and Model 30 =

FN Model 24
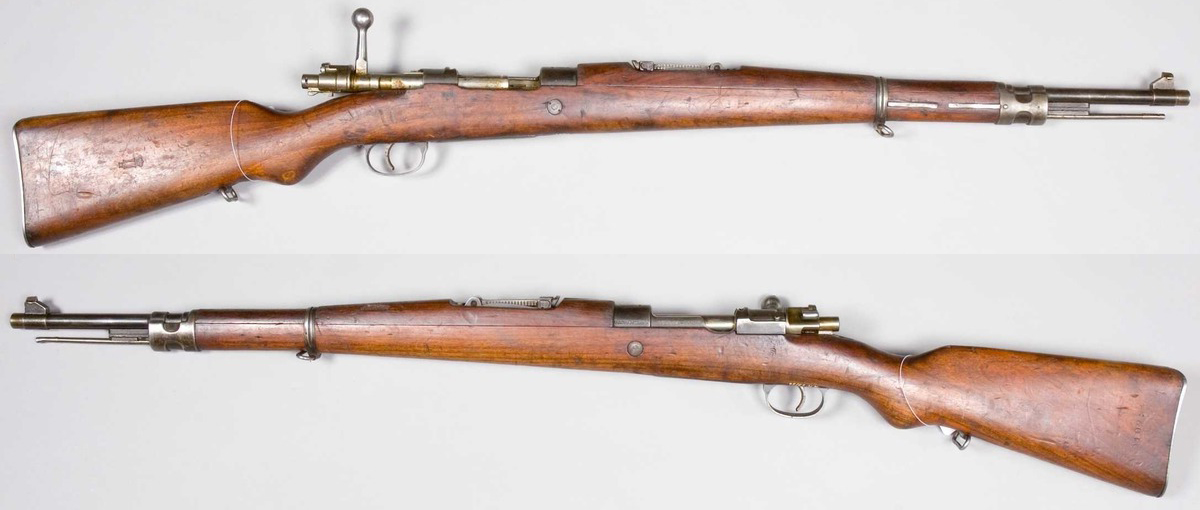
- Yugoslav Rifle Model 1924, from the collections of the Swedish Army Museum.
- Type: Bolt-action rifle
- Place of origin: Belgium

Service history
- In service: 1924–1986
- Used by: See Users
- Wars: Chaco War; Second Italo-Ethiopian War; Chinese Civil War; Constitutionalist Revolution; Spanish Civil War; Second Sino-Japanese War; World War II; Ecuadorian–Peruvian War; Greek Civil War; Korean War; Congo Crisis; Rhodesian Bush War; Papua conflict; Nicaraguan Revolution

Production history
- Manufacturer: FN Herstal, Kragujevac Arsenal
- Produced: 1924–1964

Specifications
- Mass: 3.6–3.85 kg (7.94–8.49 lb)
- Length: 955–1,094 millimetres (37.6–43.1 in)
- Barrel length: 415–585 millimetres (16.3–23.0 in)
- Cartridge: 7×57mm Mauser; 7.62×51mm NATO.30-06 Springfield; 7.65×53mm Mauser; 7.92×57mm Mauser
- Action: Bolt-action
- Muzzle velocity: 760 m/s (2,493 ft/s)
- Effective firing range: 500 m (550 yd) (with iron sights) >800 m (870 yd) (with optics)
- Feed system: 5-round stripper clip, internal magazine
- Sights: Iron sights or telescopic sight

The FN Model 1924 series is a line of Mauser Gewehr 98 pattern bolt-action rifles produced by the Belgian Fabrique Nationale. They are similar to the Czech vz. 24 rifle, however have an intermediate length (215 mm / 8.46 in) action, featuring open sights, 7.65×53mm, 7×57mm or 8×57mm IS chambering, Long rifle, Short Rifle and carbine-length barrels, hardwood stocks, and straight or curved bolt handles. This pattern rifle was discontinued from production and was no longer offered after 1932 being totally replaced by the 1930 pattern.

The FN Model 1930 series is also a line based on the Mauser Gewehr 98 pattern rifles that have the standard length (223 mm/ 8.8 in) action. They feature open sights, 7.65x53mm, 7x57mm, 8×57mm IS, .30-06 Springfield or 7.62×51mm NATO chambering, Long rifle, Short Rifle and carbine-length barrels, hardwood stocks, and straight or curved bolt handles.

Although FN Model 1930 series short-rifles and Mauser Standard Modell carbines and its military adopted model, namely the Kar98k carbines, share the same dimesions of their actions, meaning those firearms can have interchangeable bolts and the same barrel thread, the barrel length however, is shorter on FN Model 1930 series short-rifles at 585mm/ 23.03 in, compared to that of 600mm/ 23.62 in on the Kar98k carbines. This barrel length difference is evident from Venezuelan contract short-rifles manufactured by Fabrique Nationale between 1936 and 1939. It is a misconception in the military surplus firearm collectors community, thinking the barrels are interchangeable without modifications to the stock.

Although sometime referred to as the 24/30 model as a whole this is a misleading misnomer that shouldn't be used.

== History ==
After World War I and the German defeat, Belgium manufactured derivative of the Mauser 98, slightly modified. The rifle series was modified depending on each customer's needs. The designation Mle 24/30 is incorrect strictly speaking, since the Model 24 rifle is different from the Model 30. The confusion comes from the fact both versions were marketed at the same time in the 1930s. The last Mauser pattern rifles were produced in 1964.

=== Belgium ===
The Belgian Armed Forces did not order the FN Mle 1924 or 1930 before the war. After the war, some training carbines Mle 24 in .22 Long Rifle were produced for the Belgian Army, the Belgian Navy and the colonial Force Publique. The Belgian and Congolese forces also received some .30-06 new-production Mle 1930 (aka Mle 50) carbines. These carbines could be still found in the hand of Belgian reservists until 1986.

=== Bolivia ===
Bolivia received some quantities of FN Model 24/30 rifles. They were used during the Chaco War and were still in service after the 1952 Revolution.

=== China ===
The Republic of China received 24,000 FN Model 24 and 30 from 1930 to 1934 and more than 165,000 Model 30 between 1937 and 1939. The Model 30 was copied as the Type 21 rifle at the Kwantung Arsenal and Type 77 rifle (from 1937, year of the Marco Polo Bridge Incident) at the Zhejiang Iron Works. All these models were used during the Chinese Civil War and Second Sino-Japanese War, being still in service at the end of World War II and during the Korean War. Ex-Lithuanian FN 1930 rifles captured by the Soviets were even supplied post-war to the People's Liberation Army.

=== Colombia ===
In the early 1940s, Colombia bought 1930 rifles designated the Model 1940 in 7×57mm Mauser. Many were later converted to .30-06 Springfield after 1950, serving alongside newly produced FN Model 1950 short rifles and carbines.

=== Congo ===
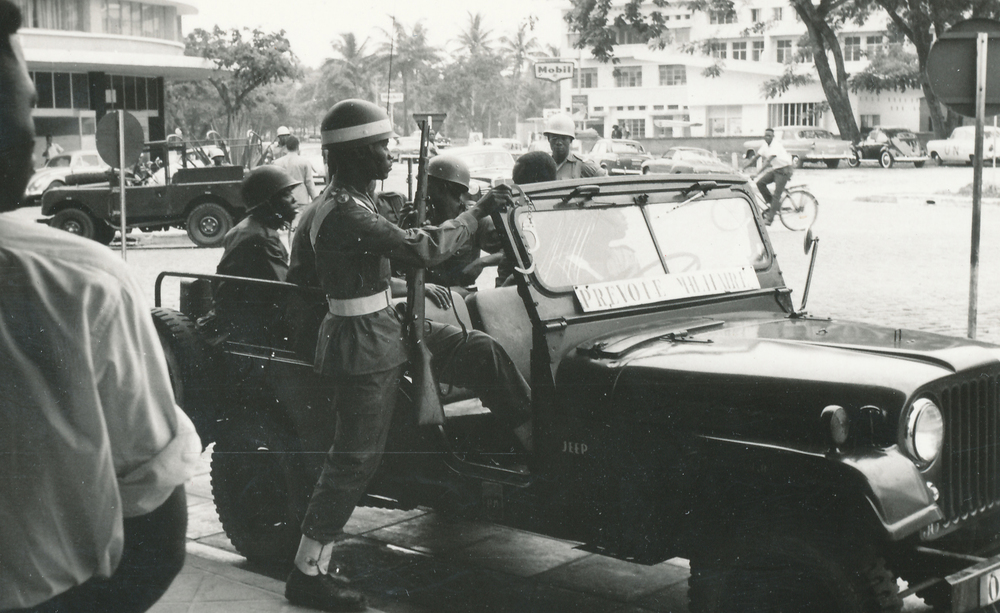
A Congolese military policeman with a Mle 24/30 carbine in Leopoldville, 1960.

After the war, the Force Publique of the Belgian Congo received some thousands of newly manufactured Mle 1930 carbines. Around 300 training rifles were also delivered. After the independence as Republic of the Congo, the Congo Crisis broke. The FN Mle 1930 were used during these conflicts, being seen in the hands of South Kasai secessionist gendarmes or of Simba rebels.

=== Ethiopia ===
The Ethiopian Empire bought 25,000 7.92×57mm Model 1930 short rifles and carbines in 1933–1935, along with an unspecified number of long rifles. They were fielded during the Italian invasion.

=== France ===
Between July and December 1939, FN produced 6,500 Model 24/30 short rifles in 7.92×57mm Mauser. They were probably used in the French colonies.

=== Germany ===
After the German invasion of Belgium, FN-made rifles were used by second-line German units. The Belgian Mle 1935 (1930 pattern) rifles were designated Gewehr 220 (b) and the Mle 1935 carbines Karabiner 420 (b). The Greek Model 30 was designated Gewehr 285 (b). The Yugoslav M24A was referred to as Gewehr 291/1 (j) and the M24B as Gewehr 291/2 (j).

=== Greece ===
Needing more rifles during the interwar period, Greece bought more than 75,000 FN Model 1930 short rifles between 1930 and 1939. They were known as Model 1930. These rifles were used during the Greco-Italian War, the German invasion, the Greek Resistance.

=== Haiti ===
During the 1948 Haiti ordered Model 1930 short rifles in .30-06 Springfield. They were used by the Volontaires de la Sécurité Nationale militia. They were kept in reserve storage in the 1990s.

=== Indonesia ===
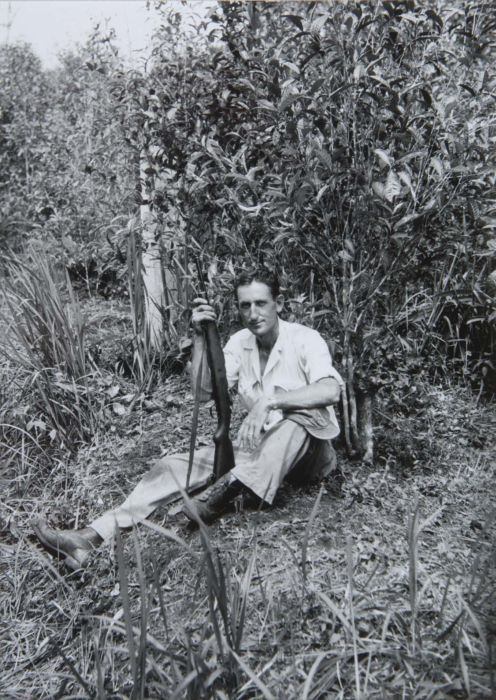
A European man with an IOB Mle 30 carbine, West Java, late 1940s.

Between 1948 and 1949, the Dutch East Indies association Indische Ondernemers Bond (IOB, "Indies Business Union"), bought 6,000 7.92×57mm Model 1930 carbines for private security tasks, such as on plantations, industries, or other business. The Royal Netherlands Indies Police also ordered 20,000 carbines in 1949, with roughly two-thirds of them already delivered before the Dutch recognized Indonesian independence in December 1949. The carbines would continue to saw service with Indonesia. It is likely that Indonesian authorities also ordered a new batch of Model 1930 carbines chambered in 7.62×51mm NATO sometime between 1962–1975, as there were reports that Indonesia had at least 10,000 7.62×51mm FN carbines in the inventory by 1982.

Around 2,700 ex-Dutch National Police Model 30 carbines were converted to the 7.62×51mm NATO by the Artillerie-Inrichtingen in 1960 for use in Dutch New Guinea. 1,700 were given to the Dutch New Guinea police and 900 were issued to the Papuan Volunteer Corps. After the territory was integrated with Indonesia in 1963, the carbines were used by both Indonesian authorities and the Free Papua Movement.

=== Israel ===
Israel bought in the early 1950s some FN Model 1930 short rifles originally in 7.92 Mauser. They were clones of the Kar 98k and were later modified to fire 7.62 NATO. This state also received some Mle 24 training rifles. A few German captured Greek Mauser were also supplied via Czechoslovakia.

=== Liberia ===
From the early 1930s to the end of World War II, the Belgian-made Model 1930 short rifle was the standard rifle of Liberian Frontier Force.

=== Lithuania ===
During the late-1930s, Lithuania bought more than 75,000 Fusil Mle 30, exactly similar to the Brno-made vz. 24 used by the Lithuanian Army. Both were designated Model 24 L.

=== Luxembourg ===
Luxembourg ordered some Model 1930 short rifles around 1930. They were later captured and used by the German Army after the invasion of Luxembourg.

=== Mexico ===
In 1926 and 1927, Mexico ordered some 35,000 FN Mle 1924 short rifles and carbines, chambered in 7mm Mauser.

=== Morocco ===
In the 1950s, Morocco bought Model 1950 carbines in .308 Winchester and .30-06.

=== Netherlands ===
In 1947, the Dutch National Police ordered 5,000 FN Model 1930 carbines in 7.92×57mm. In 1950, another 200 carbines were bought by the Amsterdam Municipal Police. Further 1,098 carbines were ordered for the municipal police departments throughout the countries between 1951 and 1956. The National Police retired their FN carbines in 1957, with the municipal police followed suit in 1965.

=== Paraguay ===
Paraguay ordered FN Mle 1930 short rifles during the late-1930s, designated them Model 1935. Others sources state 7,000 were bought before 1932 and were used during the Chaco War. In the 1960s, many of these 7.65 Mauser guns were modified to 7.62×51mm NATO in Brazil.

=== Persia ===
The Imperial Persian Army bought some FN Mle 1930 short rifles at the end of the 1920s.

=== Peru ===
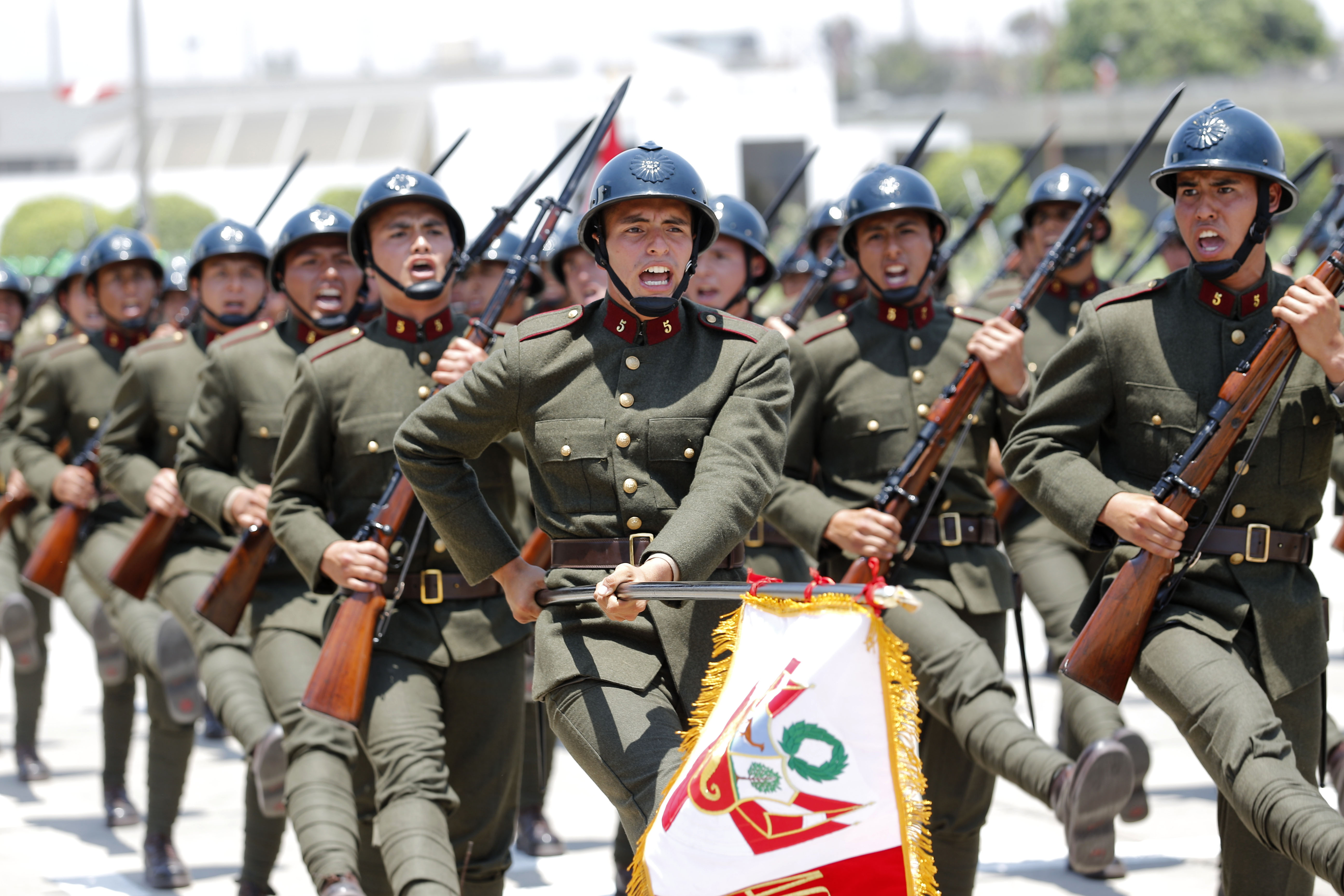
Peruvian soldiers with Model 1935 rifles during a commemoration in 2015.

During the late 1930s, Peru ordered FN 1930. It had an inverted safety, which was activated by being turned to the left of the rifle. This 7.65mm Mauser version is known as Peruvian Model 1935 short rifle. They were used during the Ecuadorian–Peruvian War of 1941. From 1959 to 1960, they were reportedly modified to accept .30-06 ammunitions.

=== Venezuela ===
Venezuela ordered 16,500 FN Mle 1930 short rifles and carbines in the mid-1930s, firing the 7mm Mauser cartridge. A very small number had a 6 inches (0.15 m) longer barrel, being designed to train the Venezuelan Olympic team. Many more standard FN Mle 1930 guns were delivered after the war.

=== Arabian Peninsula ===
In the 1930s, both the Kingdom of Saudi Arabia and the Mutawakkilite Kingdom of Yemen bought a substantial number of FN Mle 30 short rifles. Saudi Arabia bought "substantial numbers" of FN rifles in 1945–1950. Some of the Saudi rifles may have been sent to Yemen after the war.

=== Yugoslavia ===
The first Mauser-pattern rifle produced in Yugoslavia was the M24. Its predecessor, the FN Model 1924 had been produced for the Yugoslav army by FN Herstal until the Ministry and FN signed a contract on the purchase of the licence for production of rifles 7.9 mm M 24. Nearly all M24's were produced either before or during World War II, at the Kragujevac Arsenal plant. The M24 and Model 1924 are nearly identical. All M24 series weapons are designed to accept the M-24 pattern bayonet.

The final additions to the M24 family were the M24/47 rifle. These were produced by reworking existing prewar Serbian Model 24 Mausers and then refurbished with new parts at the Zastava Arms (formally Kragujevac Arsenal) plant, which was at that time under the control of the postwar communist government. The "47" of the M-24/47 indicated the beginning of the rebuild program of 1947. The rebuild program lasted into the early 1950s alongside new production of M48 rifles. M24 series rifles were used by the Royal Yugoslav Army and by nearly all sides during World War II in Yugoslavia.

=== Other users ===
Argentina bought many FN Model 24 rifles and Model 30 short rifles during the interwar period. The FN Model 1930 in 7×57mm was also exported to Costa Rica around 1935. Ecuador received 7.65×53mm Mauser Model 30 short rifles. Romania used some FN Mle 24 short rifles. Uruguay bought approximately 5,000 Model 1930 short rifles in 7mm Mauser during the 1930s. Turkey is listed as one of the users.

During the Nicaraguan Revolution, FN Mle 1930 short rifles were carried by Sandinista rebels.

== Variants ==
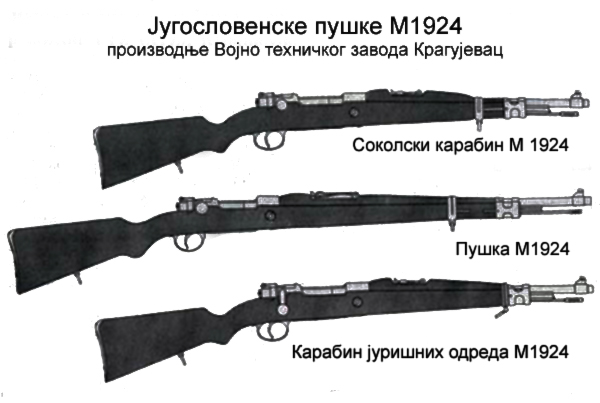
Top to bottom: Sokol carbine M1924, Rifle M1924, Assault carbine M1924ČK

=== Belgium ===
- Mod. 1922 long rifle - a full-length copy of the Gew. 98. Only sample rifles with Siamese or Ethiopian markings are known.
- Mod. 1922 carbine, an older and shorter version of the FN Model 30, chambered in 7mm and featuring a straight stock. More than 20,000 carbines were produced between 1922 and 1924 to equip Brazilian cavalry and artillery.
- Fusil Mle 1924
- Fusil Mle 1930
- Fusil Mle 1924 d’entrainement - .22 Long Rifle training rifle, manufactured 1948–1952.
- Fusil Mle 1950 - Model 1930 export rifle modified to fire .30-06 Springfield cartridges.
- Peruvian Model 1935 Short Rifle - Standard export model with an inverted safety.
- FN Mle 30-11 - 7.62 NATO sniper rifle based on the FN Mle 30, manufactured 1976–1986.

=== China ===
- Type 21 rifle - copy of the FN Model 1924 short rifle in 7.92×57mm Mauser produced in the Kwantung Arsenal in the early 1930s.
- Type 77 rifle - copy of the FN Model 1930 produced in the Zhejiang Iron Works in the late 1930s. It was not compatible with other Mausers.

=== Yugoslavia ===
- Puška M.1924 (Rifle M.1924) - Standard service rifle.
- Sokolski karabin M.1924 (Sokol carbine M.1924) - at 94.5 centimetres (37.2 in) was just slightly shorter and had a straight bolt handle. It was designed for youth firearms training and target practice.
- Jurišna puška M.1924 (Assault rifle M.1924) - These can be identified by МОДЕЛ 1924 ЧК (MODEL 1924 ČK) written on the chamber, a bent bolt handle and an additional set of sling swivels on left side. It was designed after the Sokol carbine, Czecho-Slovak short gendarmerie rifle and Iranian Musketon, for use with assault units. The production started in May 1940, only about 5,000-6,000 were made. They were issued with a special combat knife that could be fitted on the rifle as a bayonet.
- M.24/47 Rifle - M24 Rifles and Carbines of Belgian and Yugoslavian manufacture brought up to a common standard beginning in 1947 and continuing into the early 1950s. Most received new M48 barrels with 98k type front sight hoods not found on Model 1924's. Carbine features deleted rear swivel removed and plugged with dowel front carbine sling points ground off and polished.

== Users ==
- Bolivia
- Brazil (M1922)
- China
- China
- Colombia
- Republic of the Congo (Léopoldville)
- Costa Rica
- Dutch East Indies
- Ecuador
- Ethiopian Empire
- France
- Nazi Germany
- Kingdom of Greece
- Haiti
- Indonesia
- Iran
- Israel
- Liberia
- Lithuania
- Luxembourg
- Mexico
- Morocco
- Netherlands
- Nicaraguan Sandinista National Liberation Front
- Free Papua
- Paraguay
- Peru
- Kingdom of Romania
- Saudi Arabia
- Uruguay
- Venezuela
- Kingdom of Yemen
- Yugoslavia

== See also ==
- vz. 24
- Belgian Mauser Model 1935
- Belgian Mausers
- M48 Mauser
