= Vereinsgewehr 1857 =

- Type: Rifled musket
- Place of origin: Württemberg, Baden, Hesse

Service history
- In service: 1861/2-1867/68
- Used by: Württemberg, Baden and Hesse
- Wars: Austro-Prussian War

Production history
- Designed: 1856
- Manufacturer: Königlich Württembergische Gewehrfabrik and others in Suhl
- Produced: 1857–1866
- No. built: >70,000 (30,000 Württemberg; Baden and Hesse @ 20,000)
- Variants: Hesse variant

Specifications
- Mass: 4.6 kilograms (10 lb)
- Length: 1.39 metres (55 in)
- Barrel length: 100 centimetres (39 in)
- Cartridge: .547 inches (13.9 mm) Minié ball
- Caliber: 13.7 mm (0.54 in)
- Action: Caplock
- Effective firing range: 910 metres (1,000 yd) (Baden and Württemberg sights), 1,100 metres (1,200 yd) (Hesse sights)
- Feed system: Muzzle-loaded

The Vereinsgewehr 1857 (union rifle, mod. 1857) was the commonly developed rifle of Baden, Hesse and Württemberg for their troops of the army of the German Confederation (VIII Corps) as a successor of the Musket Model 1777 corrigé. The rifle for the line infantry was, with minor modifications in the sights, adopted by all three states; pistols and carbines for the cavalry and sharpshooter rifles for the Jäger were, however, developed by each state on its own.

The rifle has a percussion lock construction of Swiss model, i.e. there was no loading position of the hammer. Equipment with it standard socket bayonet.

A number were converted to the Dreyse needle fire breech-loading bolt-action system in 1867, and became known as Model 1857/67. Württemberg’s forces initially adopted the needle-fire rifle system, a breech-loading technology that Prussia had already refined and deployed with success. Württemberg favored the Albini-Brändlin system, a more advanced and robust breech-loading rifle design. However, the proposed modifications did not materialize, as shifts in the political landscape led to heightened tensions between France and the North German Confederation, led by Prussia.

== Hesse and Baden/Württemberg variants ==
Rifles from Hesse on the one hand and Baden and Württemberg on the other hand can be distinguished by their rear sights.

Württemberg and Baden union rifles and Jäger rifles use a sight with the scale below, from 200 yards (180 m) to 1,000 yards (910 m), constructed by 1st lieutenant Breithaupt.

Hesse instead used a quadrant sight with the scale above, max. 1,200 yards (1,100 m), after Darmstadt armoury colonel Müller.

== Literature ==
- Hans-Dieter Götz: Militärgewehre und Pistolen der deutschen Staaten 1800–1870, 2nd edition, Stuttgart, 1996, ISBN 3-87943-533-2 (in German)
