= Königlich Württembergische Gewehrfabrik =

Former state owned firearms manufacturer

- Industry: Firearms
- Founded: July 31, 1811 (production began November 6, 1812)
- Defunct: February 20, 1874 (sold to Wilhelm and Paul Mauser)
- Successor: Mauser
- Headquarters: Oberndorf am Neckar, Kingdom of Württemberg
- Products: Muskets, rifles, pistols (muzzle loaders)
- Owner: Kingdom of Württemberg
- Number of employees: 50–200

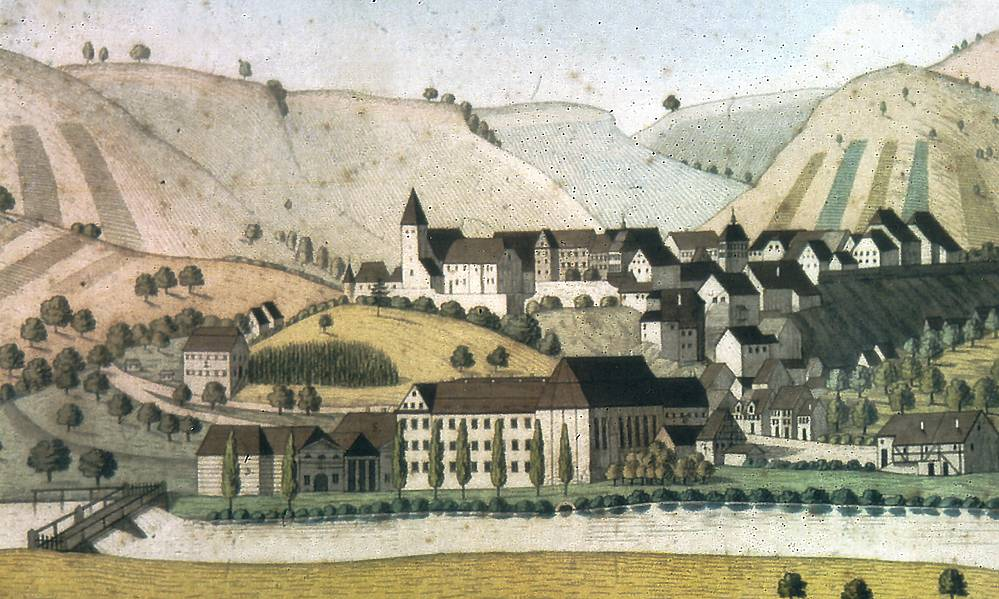
Königlich Württembergische Gewehrfabrik

The Königlich Württembergische Gewehrfabrik (English: Royal Württemberg Gun Factory) was a state-owned firearms manufacturer from 1812 to 1874 and the predecessor of the Mauser arms manufacturer.

== Creation ==
The armoury was created when Württemberg, as part of the Confederation of the Rhine, needed to outfit troops for Napoleon Bonaparte. Workshops, to get independent from foreign weapon shipments, were first created 1805 in the steel mills of Christophsthal near Freudenstadt (Black Forest); stocks were added in the Württemberg arsenal in Ludwigsburg.

King Frederick I ordered those independent workshops to be merged in a former monastery in Oberndorf am Neckar on 31 July 1811. This newly created factory began production on 6 November 1812 with about 100 employees.

The first weapons were variants of the flintlock muskets Modèle 1777, caliber .69".

== Vereinsgewehr 1857 ==
In April 1856, Baden, Hesse and Württemberg were to adopt a new rifle using percussion locks and Minié balls for their troops of the VIII Army Corps. This led to the Vereinsgewehr 1857 (union rifle, M/1857) in cal. .547". The rifle for the line infantry was, with minor modifications in the sights, adopted by all three states; pistols and carbines for the cavalry and sharpshooter rifles for the Jäger were, however, developed by each state on its own.

== 1864-1874 ==
In the war against Denmark in 1864, the superiourity of Breech-loading weapons became apparent; so, starting 1865, experiments began to adapt the Vereinsgewehr to a breech-loading rifle; amongst these, a trapdoor rifle-construction (system Milbank-Amsler), which should have been adopted.

In joint developments with Bavaria, a variant of the Dreyse needle gun was proposed and adopted as in 1867, the danger of a Prussian-French conflict arose. The system Dreyse was adopted on 5 May 1867; 6,000 rifles were delivered by Prussia. While instruction on the needle-ignition rifles was completed at the end of 1867, weapons for the 33,000 Württemberg troops lacked. So, muzzle-loading rifles were adapted to needle-ignition systems, as well as new rifles, a variant of the prussian M/1862 with the short lock of the M/65 were built.

The factory began urgent upgrading of existing rifles to the Dreyse system from 1867, requiring an increase in staff from 50 to 200, though the factory remained unprofitable.

1873, after the Franco-Prussian War, those rifles were adapted to the new standard (system Beck); in 1875, the rifles were replaced by the Mauser Model 1871.

== Sale ==
The Regal Württemberg Rifle Factory, between the end of the Napoleonic Wars and 1850, had only 50 employees and an output of about 200 weapons per year; even in the decades 1850-1870, when the smooth-bore muskets were replaced by rifles and 1868–1871, when 200 employees built the needle-ignition rifles, the factory was in deficit.

When the brothers Mauser made an offer for the factory, as the Rifle M/71 was adopted by most of the armies in the German Empire, Württemberg sold them the factory on 20-FEB-1874. Mauser then became one of the most important firearms manufacturers in the first half of the 20th century until it was sold in 1995.

== Literature ==
- Hans-Dieter Götz: Militärgewehre und Pistolen der deutschen Staaten 1800-1870, 2nd edition, Stuttgart, 1996, ISBN 3-87943-533-2
