= Mauser =

Firearms manufacturer in Germany

- Industry: Arms industry
- Predecessor: Königlich Württembergische Gewehrfabrik
- Founded: 31 July 1874
- Founders: Wilhelm and Paul Mauser
- Defunct: 2004
- Successors: Mauser Jagdwaffen GmbH (civilian weapons); Rheinmetall Waffe Munition GmbH (military weapons)
- Headquarters: Isny im Allgäu, Baden-Württemberg, Germany
- Products: Firearms

Mauser, originally the Königlich Württembergische Gewehrfabrik, was a German arms manufacturer. Their line of bolt-action rifles and semi-automatic pistols was produced beginning in the 1870s for the German armed forces. In the late 19th and early 20th centuries, Mauser designs were also exported and licensed to many countries, which adopted them as military and civilian sporting firearms. The Gewehr 98 in particular was widely adopted and copied, becoming one of the most copied firearms designs and it is the foundation of many of today's sporting bolt-action rifles. Around 10 million Gewehr 98-style rifles were produced.

== History ==
King Frederick I of Württemberg founded the enterprise as Königliche Waffen Schmieden (literally: Royal Weapons Forges) on 31 July 1811. Originally located partly at Ludwigsburg and partly at Christophsthal, the factory was transferred to the former Augustine Cloister in Oberndorf am Neckar, where Andreas Mauser worked as the master gunsmith. Of his seven sons who worked with him there, Peter Paul Mauser showed an outstanding ability to develop methods of operation that were faster and more efficient. His older brother Wilhelm assumed many of his father's duties as he became ill.

=== Early years ===
Peter Paul Mauser, often called Paul Mauser, was born on 27 June 1838 in Oberndorf am Neckar, Württemberg, which was an independent kingdom at the time. His brother Wilhelm was four years older. Another brother, Franz Mauser, went to America in 1853 with his sister and worked at E. Remington and Sons.

Paul was conscripted in 1859 as an artilleryman at the Ludwigsburg arsenal, where he worked as a gunsmith. By December 1859, he had so impressed his superiors that he was placed on inactive military service and assigned to the royal factory at Oberndorf. Paul engaged his older brother Wilhelm in working on a new gun system during their spare time after work. Paul was the engineer and designer, while Wilhelm took on the task of manager for their interests with the Oberndorf factory.

Paul's first invention was a cannon and its ammunition. During his entire career, he had a unique ability to produce both the gun and the ammunition for it. Following the success of the Dreyse needle gun (Zündnadelgewehr), Paul turned his energies to improving on that design and producing a new one. Paul and Wilhelm had separated due to differences during this time. After Paul developed a new turning-bolt design, Wilhelm was impressed enough to rejoin the business and succeeded in obtaining the financing to purchase machinery and continue development. While the original needle gun used a pin that pierced the base of the cartridge to ignite the primer in the middle, Mauser soon developed a needle that ignited the charge at the base, a superior design.

==== U.S. patent ====
Locally, the Dreyse needle gun had just been adopted, so the brothers turned to the Austrian ambassador to try to sell their own gun; the ambassador forwarded their new gun to Vienna for testing. It was here that Samuel Norris, an American, of the Remington company saw the new Mauser rifle design. In 1867, Norris hired the Mauser brothers to go to Liège to work on a new design. Norris also stipulated that patents were to be taken out in his name and that a royalty would be paid to the Mauser brothers for rifles sold. Norris was convinced that he could sell the design to the French to convert their Chassepot rifles. The Norris-Mauser patent was taken out in the United States. Remington was outraged at this behavior by Norris and never made an effort to sell the new rifle.

Based on the Dreyse needle gun, Paul developed a rifle with a turn-bolt mechanism that cocked the gun as it was manipulated by the user. The rifle initially used a firing needle; a later version used a firing pin and a rear-ignition cartridge. The rifle was shown to the Austrian War Ministry by Samuel Norris of E. Remington & Sons. Norris believed the design could be adapted to convert Chassepot needle guns to fire metallic cartridges. Shortly thereafter, a partnership was formed in Oberndorf between Norris and the Mauser brothers. The partners went to Liège in 1867, but when the French government showed no interest in a Chassepot conversion, the partnership dissolved. Paul Mauser returned to Oberndorf in December 1869, and Wilhelm arrived in April 1870. Before leaving Liège, the Mausers insisted that he submit the rifle to Royal Prussian School of Riflemanship. The results were impressive and Wilhelm was invited to the arsenal at Spandau.

==== Model M/71 ====
Paul and Wilhelm Mauser continued development of their new rifle in Paul's father-in-law's home. The Mauser rifle was accepted by the Prussian government on 2 December 1871, and was accepted for service on 14 February 1872, after a requested design change to the safety lock. The Mauser brothers received an order for 3,000 rifle sights, but actual production of the rifle was given to government arsenals and large firms. The sights were produced at the Xaver Jauch house starting 1 May 1872. After an order for 100,000 rifle sights was received from the Bavarian Rifle Factory at Amberg, the Mauser brothers began negotiations to purchase the Württemberg Royal Armoury. A delay in the purchase forced them to buy real estate overlooking the Neckar River Valley, where the upper works was built that same year. A house in Oberndorf was also rented to fulfill the Bavarian order.

==== Acquisition of Königlich Württembergische Gewehrfabrik ====
The Königlich Württembergische Gewehrfabrik was acquired on May 23, 1874, after an agreement between the Württemberg government and the Mausers to produce 100,000 Model 71 rifles. The partnership of Mauser Brothers and Company was formed between the Württemberg Vereinsbank of Stuttgart and Paul and Wilhelm Mauser on February 5, 1874. By 23 May 1874, the Mauser partnership had three factories in Oberndorf.

Wilhelm Mauser suffered from health problems throughout his life, which were aggravated by his frequent business travels. A combination of these led to his death on 13 January 1882. The partnership became a stock company with the name of Waffenfabrik Mauser on 1 April 1884. The shares held by the Württemberg Vereinsbank and Paul Mauser were sold to Ludwig Löwe & Company on 28 December 1887, and Paul Mauser stayed as the technical leader. Ludwig Löwe & Company was fifty per cent owner of Fabrique Nationale d'Armes de Guerre, a company formed in 1889 to manufacture Mauser rifles for the Belgian government. Deutsche Waffen und Munitionsfabriken A.G. (DWM) formed on 7 November 1896 as a merger of Ludwig Löwe & Company A.G., Deutsche Metallpatronenfabrik A.G., Rheinisch-Westfälischen Powder Company, and Rottweil-Hamburg Powder Company. Mauser A.G. was formed on 23 April 1897. After World War II, DWM was renamed Industrie-Werke Karlsruhe A.G. (IWK).

== Civilian market ==
Mausers were readily adapted as hunting rifles; in Africa, safari rifles were often made from Mausers. These rifles were often rechambered in larger rounds up to and including .50 caliber (12.7 mm). The adaptations usually consisted of shortening the foregrip and barrel, rechambering to accommodate popular British rounds, and minor alterations to the action. In the late 19th century and early 20th century, companies that made alterations were generally Commonwealth-based. Several proprietary big-game rounds were specifically for hunting large and dangerous game. Today, large- and small-bore Mauser-derived rifles are made all over the world for the civilian market and are popular with hunters.

Surplus military Mausers, many in mint condition, have also entered the civilian market, to be purchased by collectors and gun owners. A considerable number of surplus Karabiner 98ks were available after World War II, and some were used by Schultz & Larsen in Denmark as the basis for target rifles. Some of these are still in competitive use, although with the benefit of new barrels.

The strong following enjoyed by surplus military Mausers is partly a testament to their reliability and quality of manufacture. Additionally, the comparative low cost of surplus military ammunition has served to continue their use by shooting enthusiasts, however, in recent years it is becoming more difficult to obtain as stocks dry up. That being said, vintage surplus ammunition usually requires specialized cleaning regimens to prevent aggressive and rapid metal oxidation caused by corrosive salts (moisture attracting) contained in their priming compounds. Care must be taken to thoroughly and promptly clean and neutralize these salts after firing corrosive ammunition, lest the weapon suffer metal and mechanical damage.

The first Western-made handguns introduced into South Asia were made by the Mauser company, and the term has entered the lexicon in India and the surrounding regions, to mean any heavy pistol.

=== Manufacturers ===
- John Rigby & Company developed distinct rounds for its Mauser safari big-game rifles .350 Rigby, .416 Rigby, and the .450 Rigby).
- Česká Zbrojovka manufactures various Mauser 98 variants, the most notable being the CZ 550 Safari Magnum, the .375 H&H Magnum, and the .458 Lott.
- Blaser Group makes a Mauser M98 rifle chambered in several medium and magnum chamberings and a M98 Safari rifle, chambered in .416 Rigby, .450 Dakota, .458 Lott, and .500 Jeffery.
- Zastava Arms manufactures several 98 Mauser variants, the best known of these being the LK M70 and M85 series, in various popular calibers ranging from .22-250 to .458 Winchester Magnum. A number of the LK M70 slightly modified versions have been widely sold in other countries.
- Carl Gustav Sweden national armory took over the manufacturing of the M94/96 and the famous target rifles CG63 and CG68.
- Husqvarna Vapenfabrik made M94-96, variant M38, M38-96, and many other civilian variations; Model 46 (46A,46B, and 46AN) in cal. 6.5×55mm, 9,3×57mm and 9.3×62mm; Model 640 (646 – 6.5×55, 648 – 8×57IS, 649 – 9.3×62) without the thumb notch. They used FN action for later models 640 and 140 series. The cross-over model 1640 Improved Mauser (over the M96) is a cross between the M98 and M96. They also produced the 1900 actions.
- Fabrique Nationale de Herstal made a M98 series, the early production being small ring and later large ring of "C" (early) and "H" (late) design. The FN actions were also used by Sako of Finland as their Hi-Power rifles, by Browning on the early Medallions, as Husqvarna small ring model 146 and large ring late model 640, and by Kodiak Arms, Connecticut. Many other arms manufacturers used the FN action.

== Mauser firearms before 1945 ==
=== Rifles ===
==== Mauser-Norris Model 67/69 rifle ====
Between 1867 and 1869, the Mauser brothers and Samuel Norris developed a single-shot bolt-action rifle. The caliber and number produced are not known. Ludwig Olson wrote that an example had at one time been on display at the Smithsonian Institution in Washington, D.C. The rifle was patented in Austria by Samuel Norris on 24 December 1867. The bolt head did not rotate, a feature chosen by Paul Mauser to "protect the heads of paper cartridges from friction and possible damage while locking the bolt, and to provide a non-rotary seat for the extractor when metallic cartridges were used."

An improved version of the rifle used a coil spring wrapped around the firing pin and a safety and a cocking piece attached to the rear of the firing pin. This rifle was shown to the Prussian government, and after some design changes to the safety, was accepted for service as the Infantry Rifle Model 71 on 14 February 1872. Although it is sometimes considered a close relative of the Chassepot rifle, and borrowing Dreyse's turning-bolt action lock, the most innovative features of the new weapon were the work of Peter Paul Mauser.

==== Model 1871 and derivatives ====
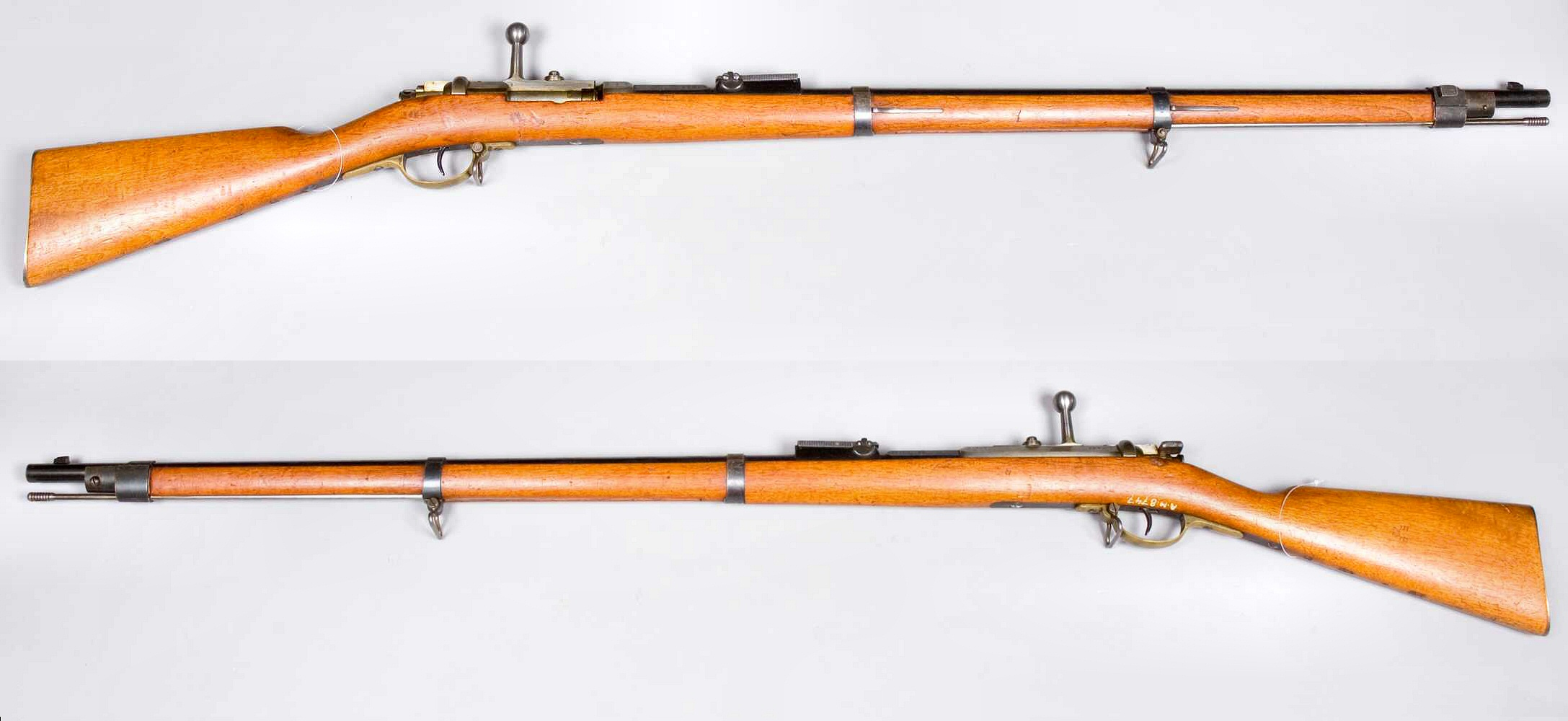
Mauser Model 1871 rifle

The Mauser Model 1871 was the Mauser brothers' first rifle. It was adopted by the German Empire (except for the Kingdom of Bavaria) as the Gewehr 71 or Infanterie-Gewehr 71 (I.G.Mod.71 was engraved on the rifles). Production began at the Oberndorf factory for the infantry version, which fired a black powder 11×60mm round from a long 850 mm (33 in) barrel. Shorter versions were introduced with the 700 mm (28 in) barreled Jäger and 500 mm (20 in) cavalry carbine.

Slightly modified versions were widely sold to other countries, firing bullets that would today be considered very large, typically 9.5mm to 11.5mm. Such large bullets were necessary due to the limitations of black powder, which hindered velocities. Serbia designed an improved version of the Model 71 in 10.15mm, made in Germany and called the Mauser-Milovanović M1878/80. In 1884 an 8-shot tubular magazine was added by Mauser to the Model 71/84. The Turkish model 1887 rifle was the first of a series of rifles produced for the Turkish Army. Its design echoed that of the German Gewehr 71/84 service rifle: a bolt-action weapon with a tubular magazine beneath the barrel. The Turkish contract specified that if any other nation ordered Mauser rifles with more advanced technology, that design would be used in the Model 1887 to fill the remainder of the Turkish order. This clause was utilized after Belgium adopted the Model 1889 rifle.

==== Models 1889/90/91 and Experimental Model 92 ====
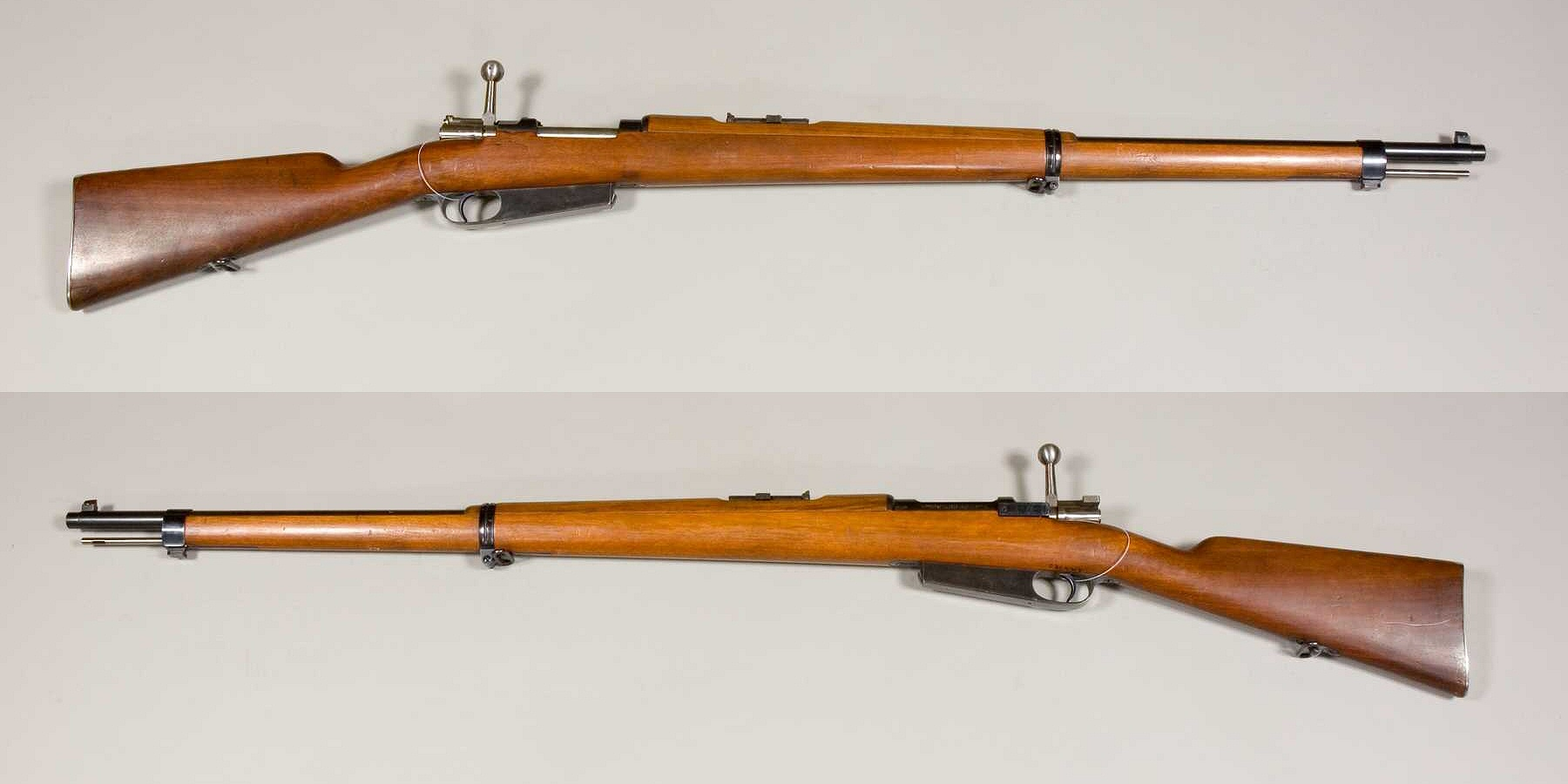
Mauser Experimental Model 92 in caliber 8x58R. This rifle took part in the rifle trials that led to the Swedish Mauser.

After the Mauser brothers finished work on the Model 71/84 in 1880, the design team set out to create a small caliber repeater that used smokeless powder. Because of setbacks brought on by Wilhelm Mauser's death, they failed to have the design completed by 1882, and the German Rifle Test Commission (Gewehr-Prüfungskommission) was formed. The commission preferred to create their own design. Paul Mauser created two different variations of the same rifle, one with a stock strengthened with a barrel shroud and a traditional design following the layout of the 71 series in hope he might be able to overturn the commission's decision, or at least sell his design to the Kingdom of Bavaria, which adopted its own arms. The two rifles became known as the 89 Belgian (with a barrel shroud) and the 91 Argentine (with a 71 layout) Mausers, identical in their function and feed system. The main features were the ability to use stripper clips to feed the magazine (a revolution in rate of fire), and its rimless 7.65×53mm Mauser ammunition, advanced for the time.

The system proved impressive at the 1884 Bavarian Arms Trials. Both firearms were a success, but decision-makers were not convinced that the stripper feed was superior to the en-bloc system employed by Mannlicher. In response, Mauser started small-scale production of the design in an effort to interest foreign nations, but failed to convince any of the European major powers.

The Belgian attache, however, urged his government to contact Mauser, hoping the design might give them a chance to found a domestic arms industry. The heavy-barreled Mauser with the barrel shroud resulted in the founding of arms manufacturer FN Herstal. FN could not keep up with orders, so they outsourced production to the Birmingham Small Arms Company in England.

The Belgians' talks with Mauser prompted the Ottoman Empire to consider the design. In the end they ordered their own simpler variation of the 89 Belgian Mauser known as the 90 Turkish. While this was taking place, the Argentine Small Arms Commission contacted Mauser in 1886 to replace their Model 71s; since they wished to keep retraining of their armed forces to a minimum, they chose the Mauser 91. As with other early Mausers, most such arms were made by the Ludwig Loewe company, which in 1896 joined with other manufacturers to form Deutsche Waffen und Munitionsfabriken.

All variations used the same 7.65 mm round-nosed cartridge. Many parts were interchangeable, with the exception of the bayonets of the 89 and 90/91; the barrel shroud made the bayonet ring too wide. The 89 Mauser was used by the second-line units of Belgium during the Second World War.

A non-rotating Mauser claw extractor was introduced in the Model 92. Several variations of this model were entered in rifle trials for the U.S. Army of that year; the Norwegian Krag–Jørgensen rifle was ultimately chosen.

==== Spanish M93 ====
The Mauser Model 1893 is a bolt-action rifle commonly referred to as the "Spanish Mauser", though the model was adopted by other countries in other calibers, most notably the Ottoman Empire. The M93 introduced a short staggered-column box magazine as standard, holding five smokeless 7×57mm Mauser rounds flush with the bottom of the rifle, which could be reloaded quickly by pushing a strip of rounds from the top of the open bolt. It still had only two locking lugs.

==== Swedish M1894 rifle ====
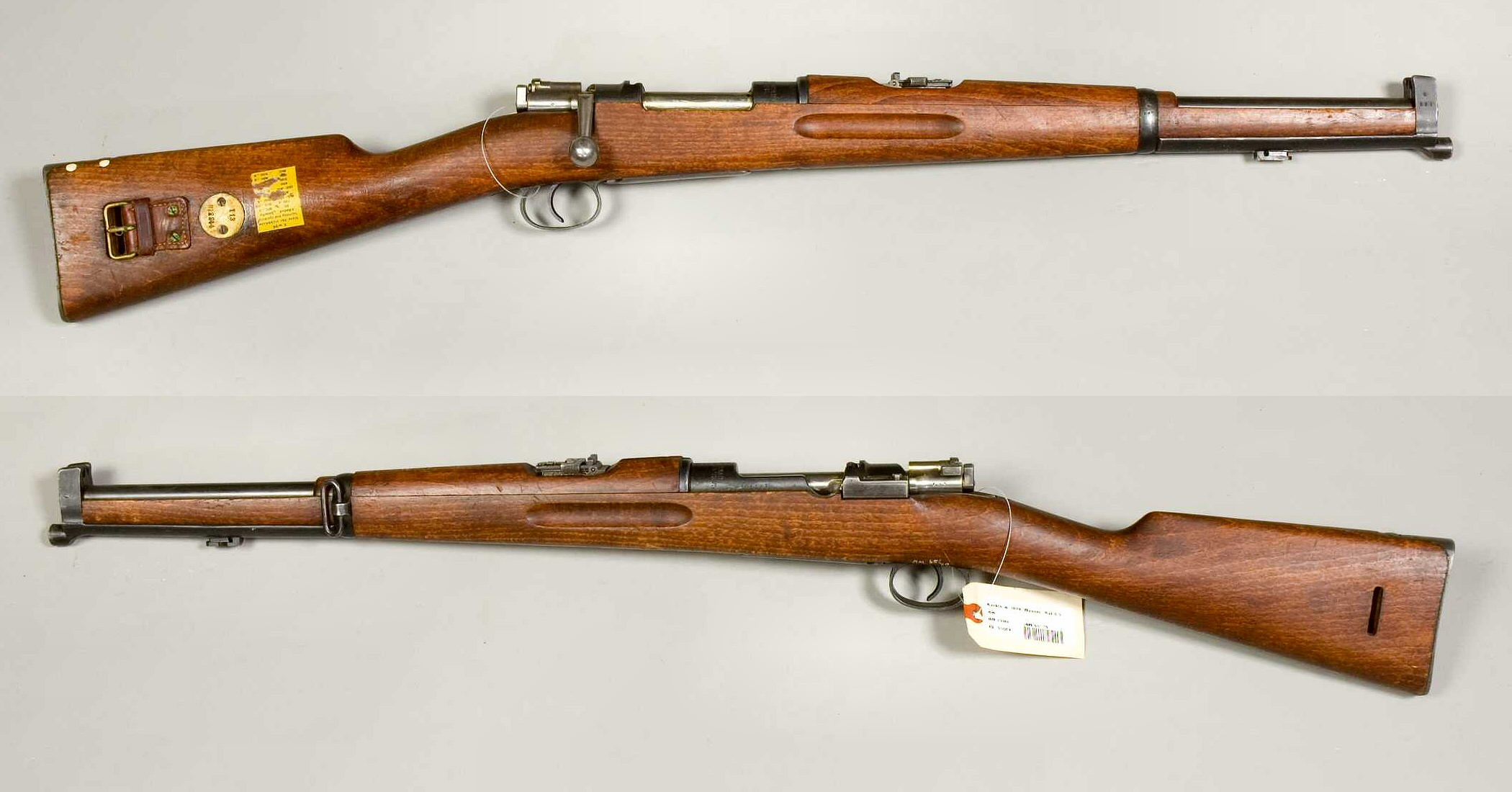
Swedish carbine Model 1894

The Swedish army was issued the Model 94. The similar Model 1895 was sold to Mexico, Chile, Uruguay, China, Persia, and the South African states of Transvaal and the Orange Free State (Boers). A safety feature offered by the Model 1895 was a low shoulder at the rear of the receiver, just behind the base of the bolt handle, which would contain the bolt in the unlikely event that the front locking lugs sheared off due to excessive pressure. South African Mausers were highly effective against the British during the Second Boer War; these proved deadly at long ranges, prompting the British to design their own Mauser-inspired high-velocity cartridge and rifle. These rare Mauser carbines and rifles—especially the Model 1895—can be easily identified by the letters "OVS" signifying "Oranje-Vrystaat" (Afrikaans for "Orange Free State") either marked on the weapons' receiver ring and the stock directly below, or otherwise carved into the right side of the buttstock. The British Pattern 1914 Enfield with a Mauser-style lug might have replaced the Lee–Enfield, but the exigencies of World War I prevented this from happening. The Lee–Enfield continued to see service until it was replaced by a semi-automatic L1A1 after World War II. The Germans had faced the U.S. M1917 rifle during World War I, which was the Pattern 14 rifle adapted to fire the U.S. .30-06 cartridge of the American M1903 Springfield rifle.

==== Chilean Mauser Model 1895 ====
The Mauser Model 1895 adopted as Fusil Mauser Chileno Mo 1895 by Chilean forces, is a bolt operated magazine fed rifle using the 7×57mm Mauser cartridge. It is the first major modification of the Mauser Model 1893 and was produced by Deutsche Waffen und Munitionsfabriken, known as DWM, and Ludwig Loewe Company from 1895 to 1900.

==== Model 1896 ====
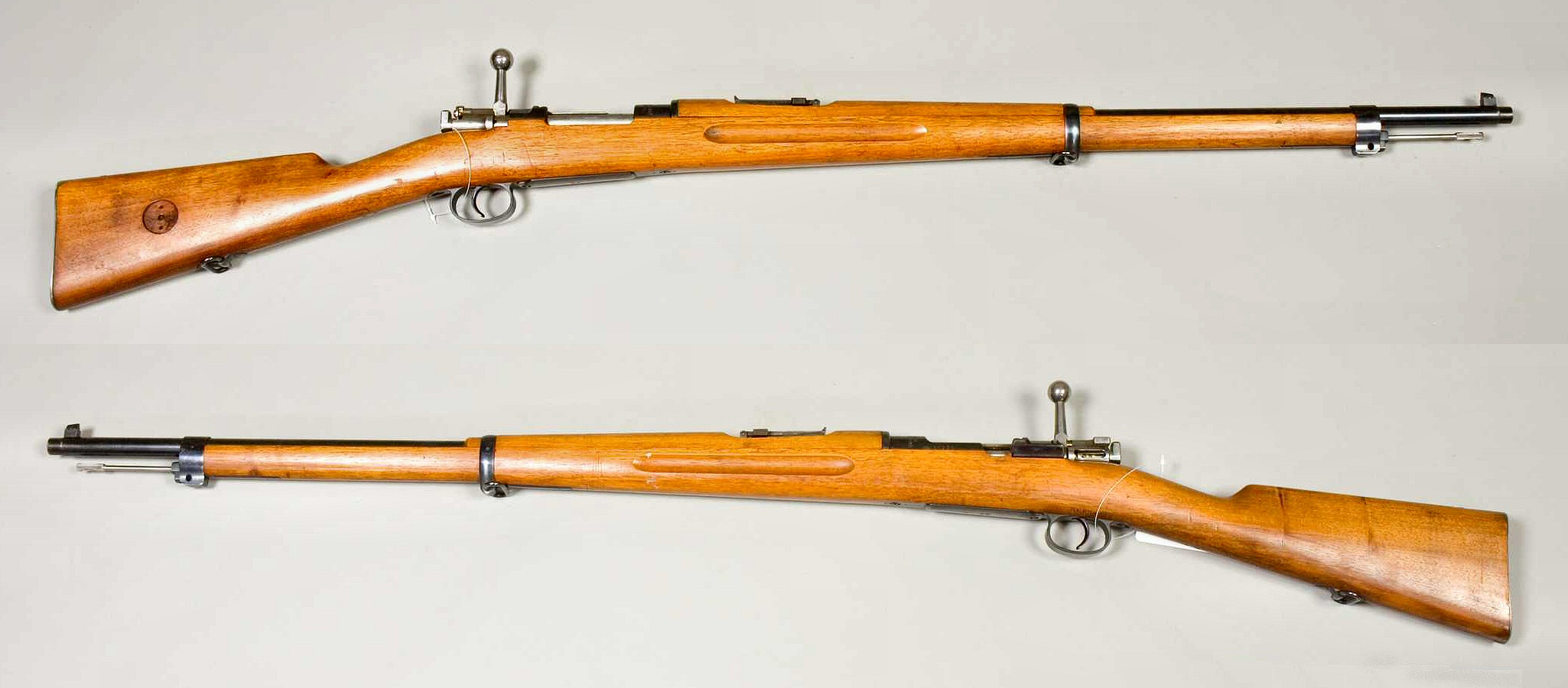
Swedish rifle Model 1896

On 3 November 1893, the United Kingdoms of Sweden and Norway adopted the 6.5×55 mm cartridge. As a result, the Swedes chambered their new service weapons, the m/94 carbine and m/96 rifle, in this round. The rifle action was manufactured relatively unchanged from 1896 to 1944, and the m/94 Carbine, m/96 Rifle, m/38 Short Rifle, and m/41 Sharpshooter models are known by collectors as "Swedish Mausers". They are still sought after by military service rifle shooters and hunters. Initial production of the weapons was in Germany by Waffenfabrik Mauser, with the remainder being manufactured under license by Sweden's state-operated Bofors Carl Gustaf factory. The m/38 short rifle was produced by Husqvarna; additional m/38s were converted from Model 96 rifles.

"Swedish steel" is a term for the steel used by the German Mauser, and later by Swedish manufacturing facilities, to make the m/96 rifles. Swedish iron ore contains the proper percentages of trace elements to make good alloy steel. Thus, though lacking the industrial base necessary for mass-producing steel and iron, the Swedish steel industry developed a niche market for specialty high-strength steel alloys containing nickel, copper, and vanadium. Swedish steels were noted for their strength and corrosion resistance and were especially suited for use in toolmaking, cutlery, and firearms. When Mauser was contracted to fabricate the initial production runs of Swedish Mausers in Germany due to production delays, Sweden required the use of Swedish steel in the manufacturing process. The Swedish Ordnance Office continued to specify the same Swedish steel alloy in Swedish-made Mausers until the last new-production m/38 barrelled actions were completed in 1944.

==== Model 1898 ====
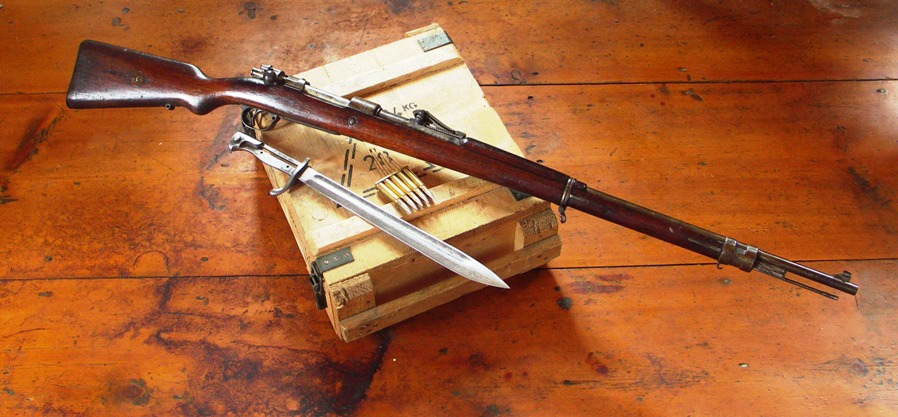
Mauser Model 98

In 1898, the German Army purchased a Mauser design, the Model 98, which incorporated improvements introduced in earlier models. The weapon was originally chambered for the Patrone 88 and officially entered German service as the Gew. 98 on April 5, 1898. This remains by far the most successful of the Mauser designs, helped by the onset of two world wars that demanded vast numbers of rifles.

Noticeable changes from previous Mauser rifle models included better ruptured case gas venting, better receiver metallurgy, and a larger 35.8 mm (1.41 in) diameter receiver ring compared to previous Mauser "small ring" bolt-action designs that had 33 mm (1.30 in) diameter receiver rings for additional strength and safety. Mauser incorporated a third "safety" lug on the bolt body to protect the shooter in the event that one or more of the forward locking lugs failed. In 1903 the improved 7.92×57mm Mauser S Patrone "spitzer" (pointed) round was introduced. Mauser had nothing to do with the development of this round. The S Patrone provided the accuracy and barrel life improvements the German military was looking for and it was in response to the French adoption of a pointed boat-tail bullet, which offered better external ballistic performance. The bullet diameter was increased from 8.08 mm (0.318 in) to 8.2 mm (0.323 in). Pointed or spitzer bullets give bullets a lower drag coefficient (C_{d}) making them decelerate less rapidly and also markedly decreases the lateral drift caused by crosswinds, improving the effective range of the cartridge.

Most existing early Model 98s and many Model 88s were modified before World War I to take the new round, designated "7,9mm" or "S Patrone" by the German military. Modified Model 88s can be identified by an "S" on the receiver. Due to the possibility for overpressure from the undersize barrel, the spitzer round cannot safely be used in unmodified guns, particularly with Model 88 rifles.

Paul Mauser died on 29 May 1914, before the start of World War I that August. The war caused a spike in demand for the company's rifles. The 98 carbines were sold, as well as an experimental version with a twenty-rather than five-round box magazine. The extended magazine was not well received, however.

A number of carbine versions known as Karabiner 98s were introduced and used in World War I, some even shorter than the later K.98k. These carbines were originally only distributed to cavalry troops, but later in the war to the special storm troop units as well.

==== G98 derivatives ====
Many military rifles derive from the M98 design. Some of these were German-made by various contractors other than Mauser:

- M1902 & M1936 Mexican in 7×57mm Mauser
- M1903 & M1905 Turkish in 7.65×53mm Argentine
- M1907 Chinese in 6.8×57mm
- M1904 Portuguese in 6.5×58mm Vergueiro, 7×57mm Mauser and 7.92×57mm Mauser
- M1907 and M1908 Brazilian in 7×57mm Mauser
- M1908 Uruguayan in 7×57mm produced by the Deutsche Waffen und Munitionsfabriken
- M1910 Serbian in 7×57mm Mauser
- M1909 Argentine in 7.65×53mm
- Steyr Model 1912 Mauser for Mexico, Chile and Colombia, in 7×57mm Mauser
- Type 24 Chinese in 7.92×57mm
- Belgian Mauser Model 1935
- M1943 Spanish short (not to be confused with the M93 Spanish Mauser) in 7.92×57mm manufactured in the Spanish arsenals. Will have "La Coruna" or the Spanish Air Force Eagle stamped on the top of the receiver. Virtually identical to the K98k.
- vz. 98/22 Often made from G98 parts, rebuilt in the BRNO factory in Czechoslovakia.
- Kırıkkale M1938 - made by Turkish MKEK.

The Mauser 1918 T-Gewehr was the world's first anti-tank rifle—the first rifle designed for the sole purpose of destroying armored targets. The weapon, essentially an enlarged G98, fired 13×92mm (.525-caliber) TuF (Tank und Flieger, "tanks and aeroplanes") semi-rimmed cartridges. In May 1918, the Mauser Company began mass-producing the Mauser 13mm Tank Abwehr Gewehr Mod. 18 in Oberndorf am Neckar.

Following the collapse of the German Empire after World War I, many countries that were using Mauser models chose to develop, assemble, or modify their own G98-action rifle designs. The most prolific of them were the Czechoslovak M1922 CZ 98 and M1924 CZ and the Belgian Fabrique Nationale M1924 and M1930.

The Belgians and Czechs produced and widely exported their "Mausers" in various calibers throughout the 1920s and 1930s, before their production facilities were absorbed by Nazi Germany to make parts or whole rifles for the German Army. Strictly speaking, these were not "Mauser" rifles, as they were not engineered or produced by the German company.

To take advantage of the widespread and popular German single-shot 8.15×46mmR cartridge for use in a military firearm, a modified Gewehr 98 referred to as a "Wehrmannsgewehr" was designed. These were made primarily as single shots; some only had a wood block in the magazine space. These became the 1936 Olympic team rifles for the Germans.

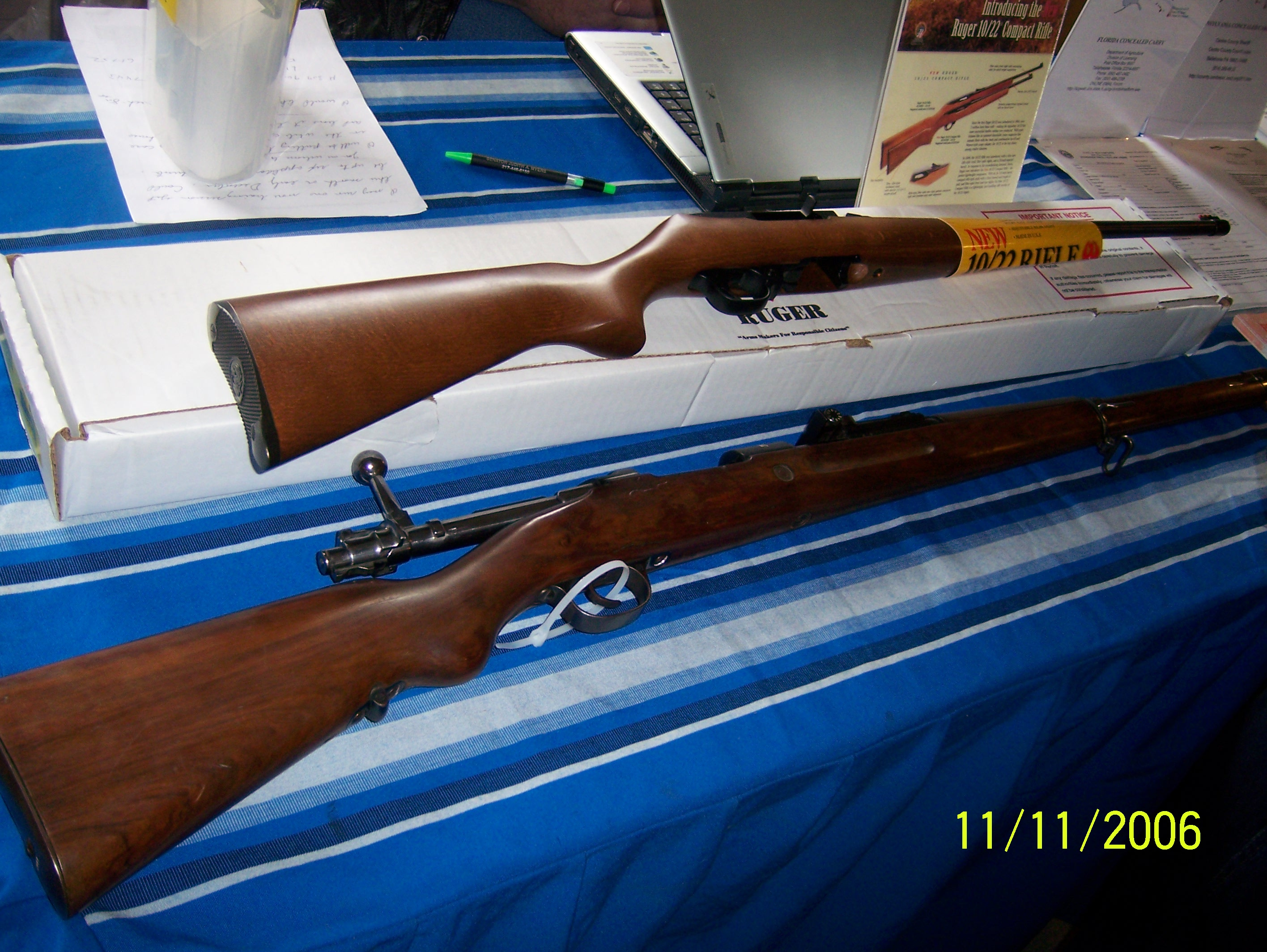
An 8.15×46R Mauser Wehrmannsgewehr

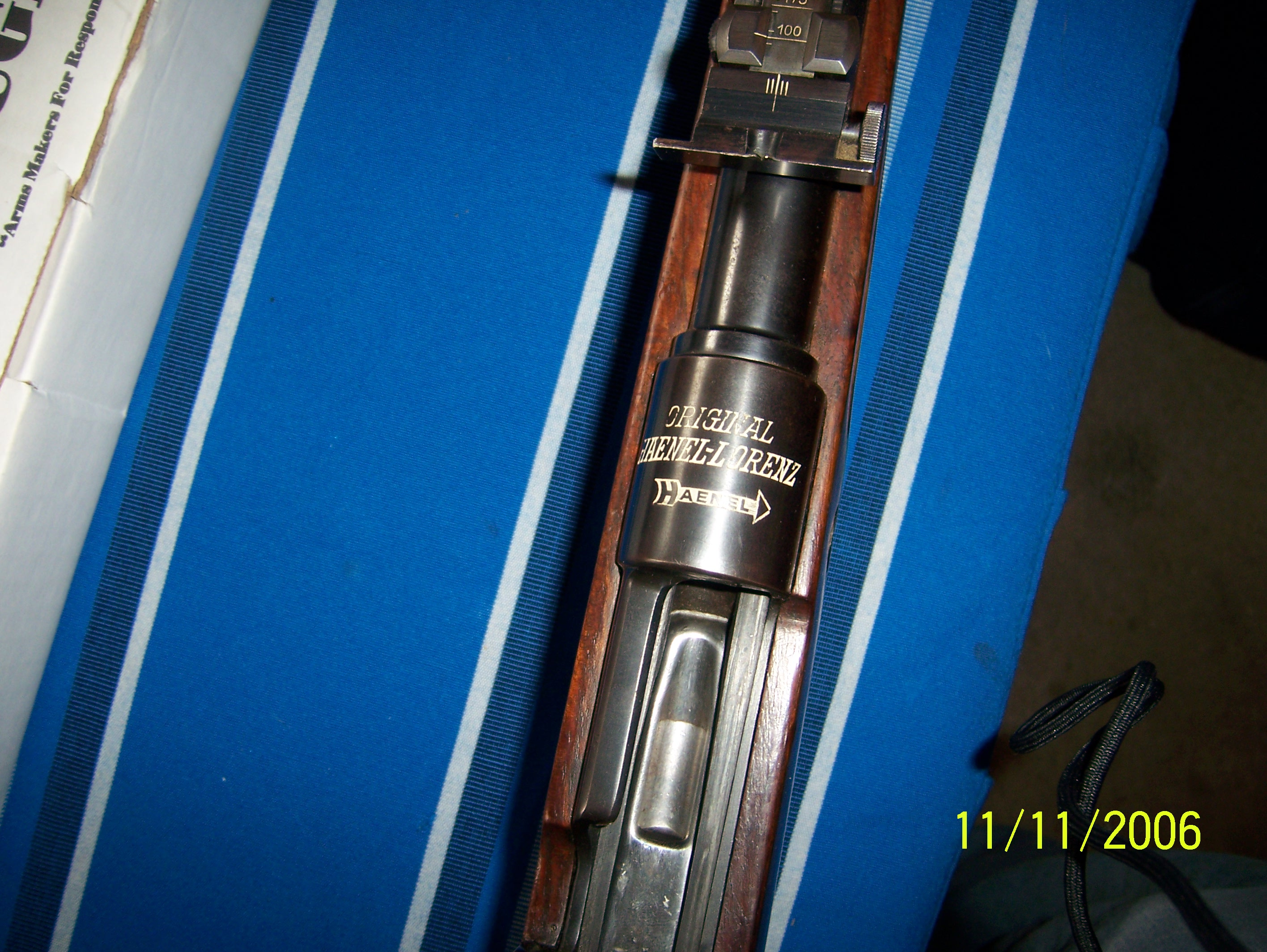
The top of the receiver on an 8.15x46r Wehrmannsgewehr

As the restrictions on production were increasingly ignored by the Germans in the 1930s, a new Mauser, the Mauser standard model, was developed from the rifle-length Karabiner 98b. It was nominally intended for export and civilian sales. While many standard model rifles were indeed exported, it was meant primarily for use by the revived German military. It rapidly evolved into the Karabiner 98 Kurz, which was adopted by Nazi Germany as the standard infantry rifle in 1935 and saw service until the end of World War II.

==== Mauser M1902 ====
Long recoil semi-automatic rifle, lacked in ejecting cartridges.

==== Type A, Model B, Model K, Armee-Model C, Africa Model ====
A series of very successful hunting rifles were developed in the first decades of the 20th century. The Special Rifle Type A was the top-of-the-line sporting rifle of the early 20th century. The Model B (B for Büchse) and Model K were sport rifles offered in many configurations. The Model C, made from 1903 to 1930, was a cheap rifle made to accommodate a range of cartridges for hunting. The Mauser Africa Model, introduced around 1904 or 1905, was used mainly by settlers in Africa.

==== Model M1913 Selbstladegewehr Sporter ====
Semi-automatic rifle adapted by the German military for aircraft use. It was produced in 9mm caliber and with a scope rail.

==== Model M and model S ====
The Model M was introduced in 1914. A Model S (S for stutzen or short) was also offered.

==== Mauser M1916 ====
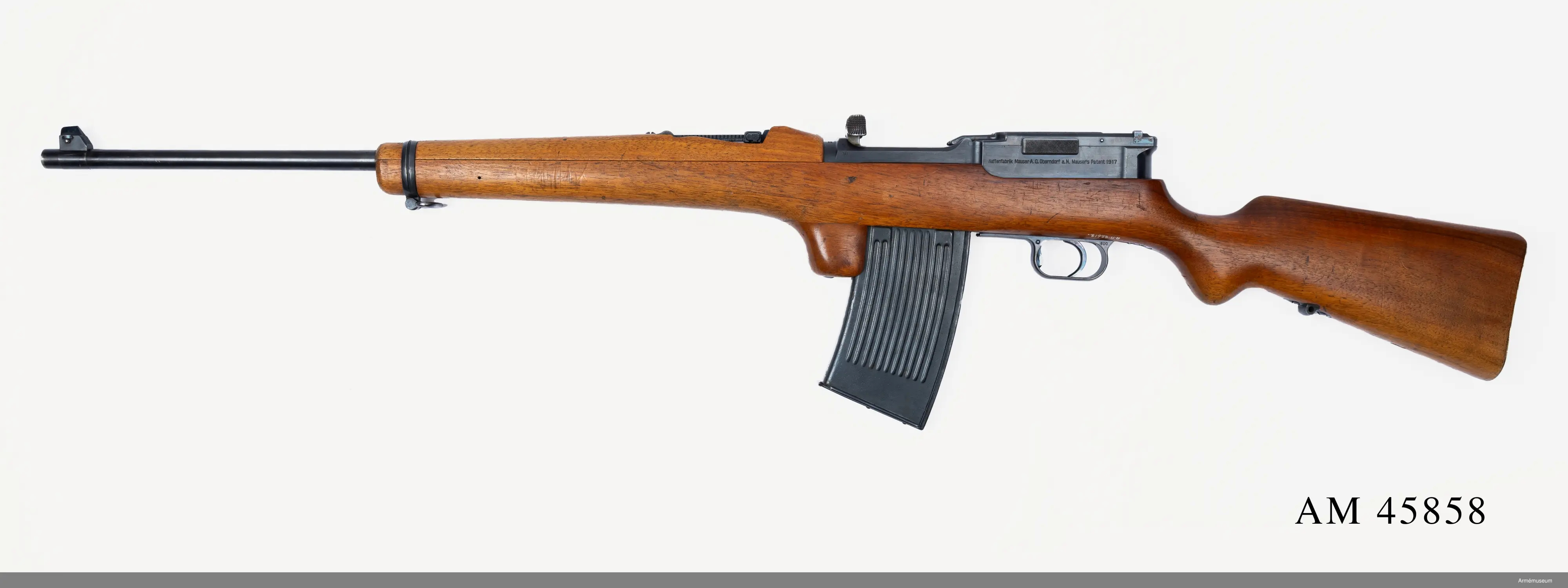
Mauser M1916

The Mauser M1916, or Mauser selbstladekarabiner (self-loading carbine), was a semi-automatic rifle that used a delayed blowback mechanism and fed from 25-round detachable magazine. The process of developing a semi-automatic rifle cost Paul Mauser an eye when a prototype suffered an out-of-battery detonation. The mechanism was quite delicate, working reliably only when completely clean, which made the rifle unsuitable for infantry use. However, the Imperial German Flying Corps adopted the rifle for its aircraft crews in 1915, and more generally in 1916. Aerial combat provided the clean environment the rifle required, and its semi-automatic capability was an advancement over bolt-action rifles.

However, the rifle was expensive to make. The air service turned to the Swiss-produced Mondragón rifle, which was tested by the army; though less accurate than Mauser's design, it cost about a third as much. The widespread adoption of machine guns then made all self-loading rifles obsolete in the air service.

==== Mauser 1925 Special range rifle ====
The 1925 Special range rifle was a commercial product introduced in 1925 and sold in the United States. It was intended for high accuracy range shooting. The company also produced a .22 caliber training rifle during this time frame.

==== Karabiner 98k ====
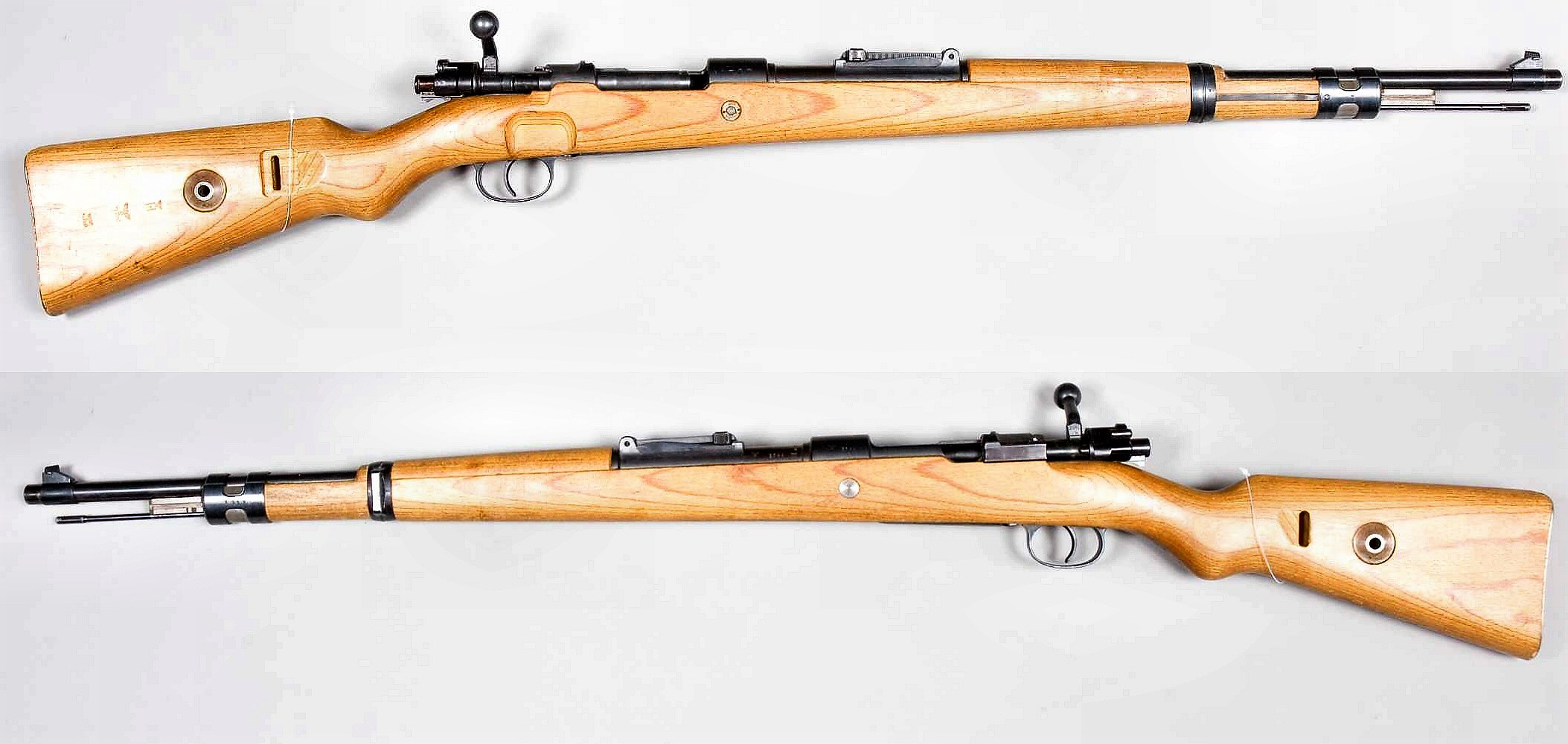
Karabiner 98k in mint condition, made in 1940. From the collections of the Swedish Army Museum.

The Karabiner 98k "Mauser" (often abbreviated "K98k" or "Kar98k"), adopted in the mid- 1930s, became the most common infantry rifle in service in the German Army during World War II. The design was developed from the Karabiner 98b, one of the carbines developed from the Model 1898. The K98k was first adopted by the Wehrmacht in 1935 as their standard-issue rifle, with many older versions being converted and shortened.

==== Mauser KKW cadet rifle ====
The Mauser KKW cadet rifle is a single shot, .22 caliber rifle that was introduced in 1938. It is virtually identical to the Karabiner 98k. These cadet rifles were used by all German military, paramilitary and police organizations, especially the Hitler Youth.

==== Gewehr 41 ====
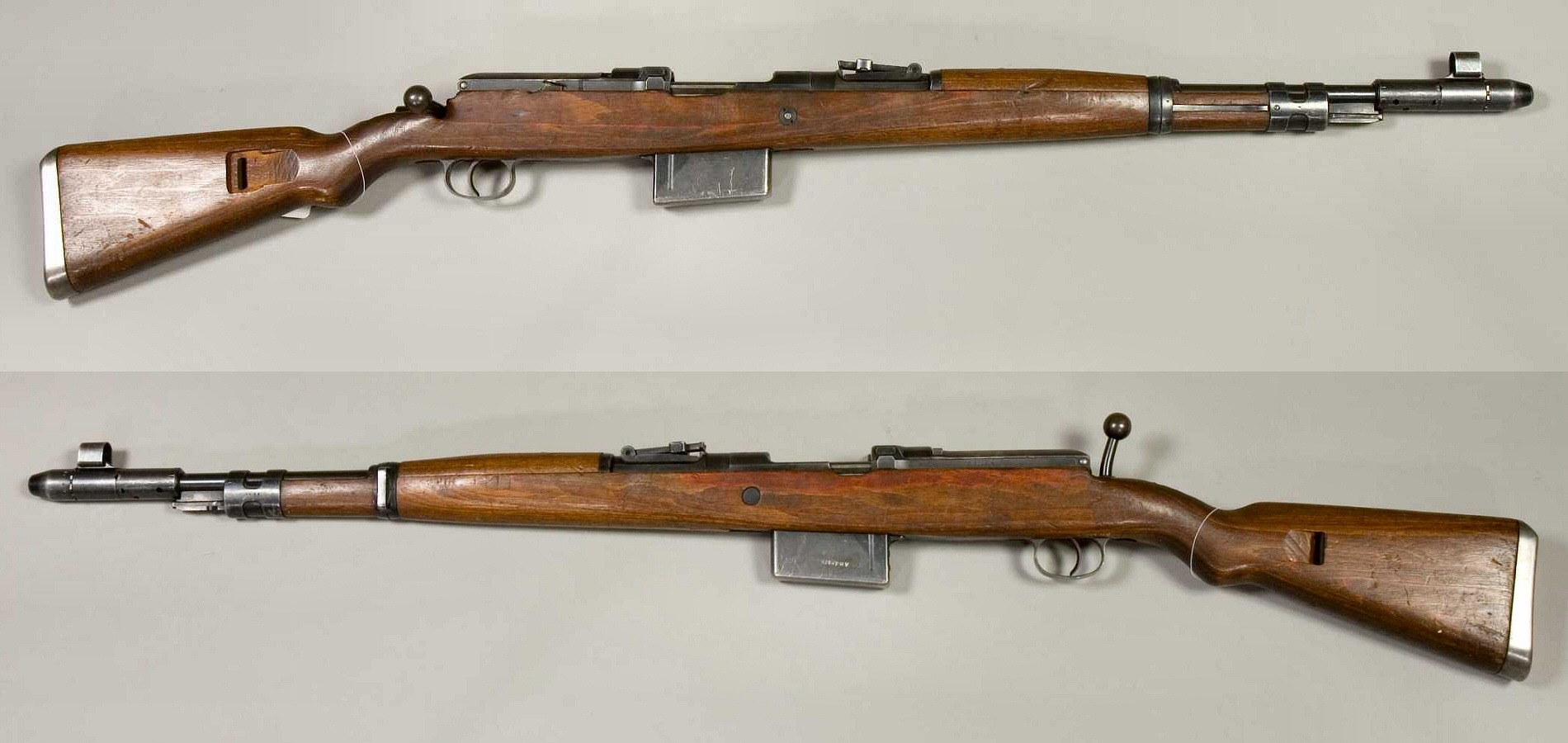
Gewehr 41 (Mauser version) semi-automatic rifle

The Gewehr 41 rifles, commonly known as the "G41(W)" or "G41(M)", were semi-automatic rifles used by Nazi Germany during World War II. By 1940 the Wehrmacht issued a specification to various manufacturers, and Mauser and Walther submitted prototypes that were very similar. Both Gewehr 41 models used a mechanism known as the "Bang" system (named after the designer of the M1922 Bang rifle). In this system, gases from the bullet were trapped near the muzzle in a ring-shaped cone, which in turn pulled on a long piston rod that opened the breech and re-loaded the gun. Both models also included inbuilt 10-round magazines that were loaded using two of the stripper clips from the Karabiner 98k, utilizing 7.92×57mm Mauser rounds, which made reloading relatively slow. The Mauser design, the G41(M), failed as it, along with its G41(W) counterpart, suffered from gas system fouling problems. Only 6,673 G41(M) rifles were produced before production was halted, and of these, 1,673 were returned as unusable.

=== Handguns ===
==== Mauser C78 "zig-zag" Revolver ====
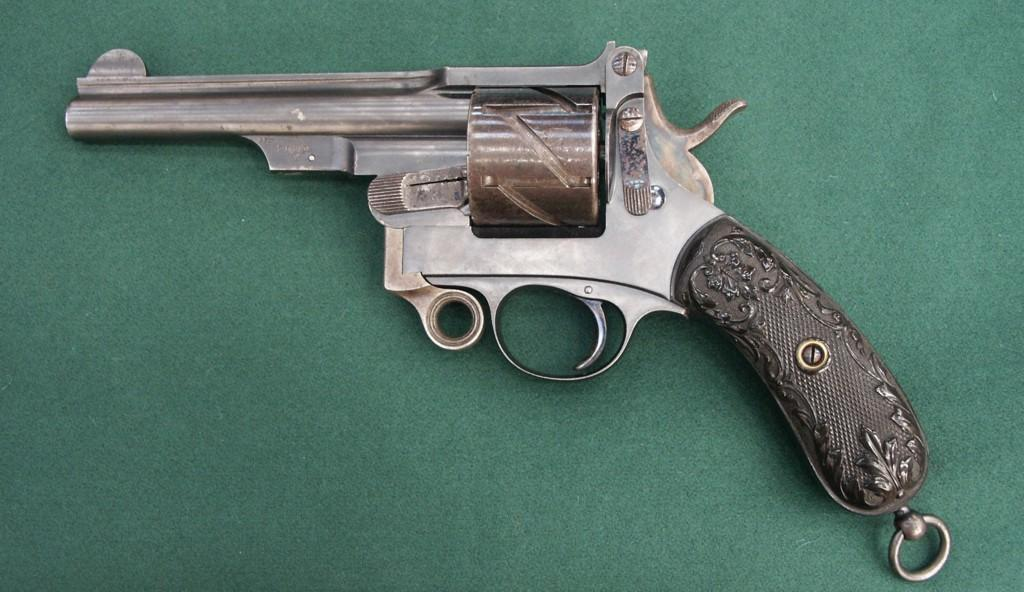
Mauser C78 "zig-zag"

The Mauser C78 zig-zag was a revolver manufactured by Mauser during the late 19th century. It was Paul Mauser's first handgun design.

==== C1896 Pistol ====
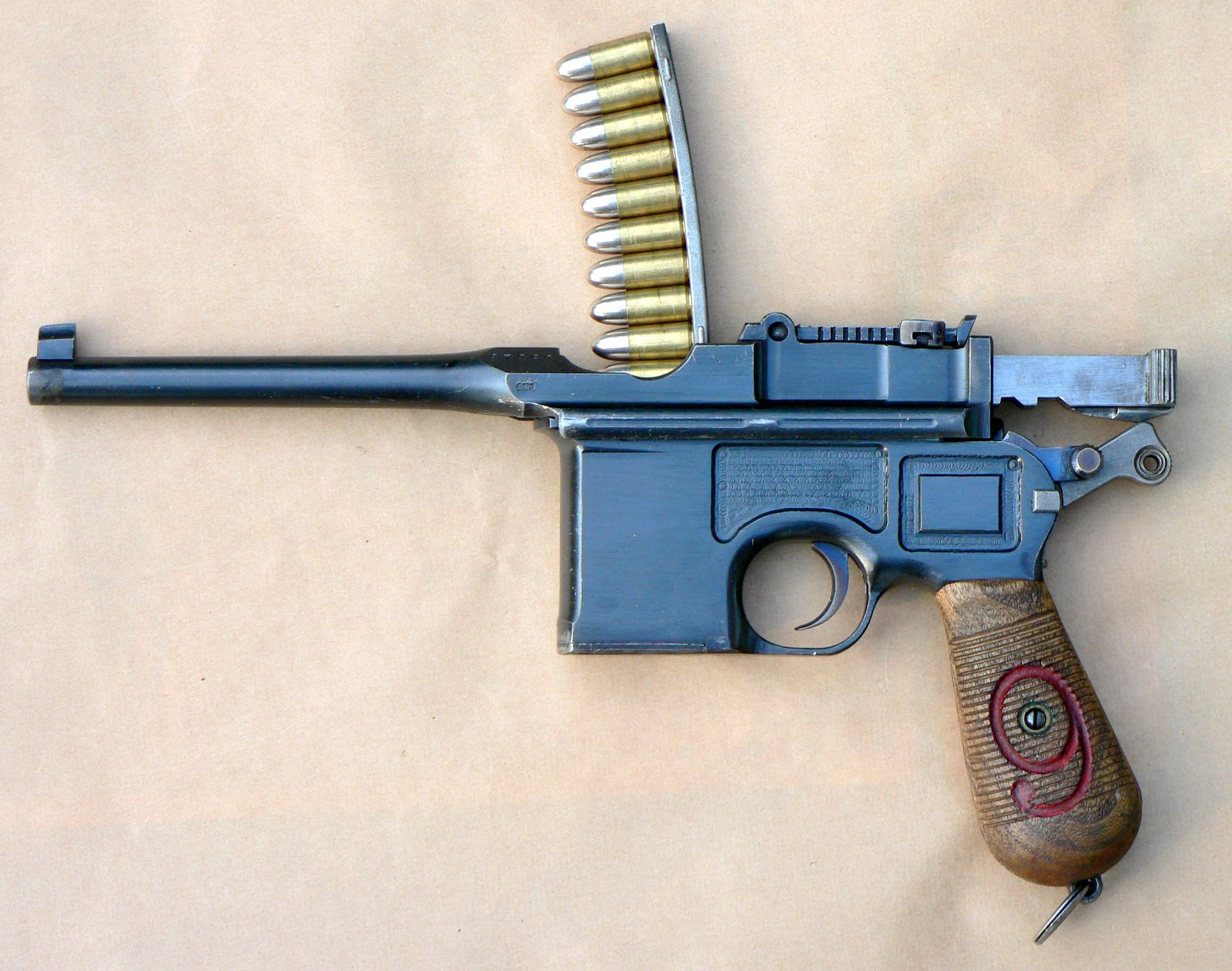
Mauser C96 in 9 mm Luger

Mauser branched out into pistol design in 1896, producing the C96, commonly known as "broomhandle," designed by the three brothers Fidel, Friedrich, and Josef Feederle (often erroneously spelled "Federle"). All versions used detachable shoulder stock holsters. Over a million C96s were produced between 1896 and the late 1930s.

==== Mauser 1910 and 1914 pocket pistols ====
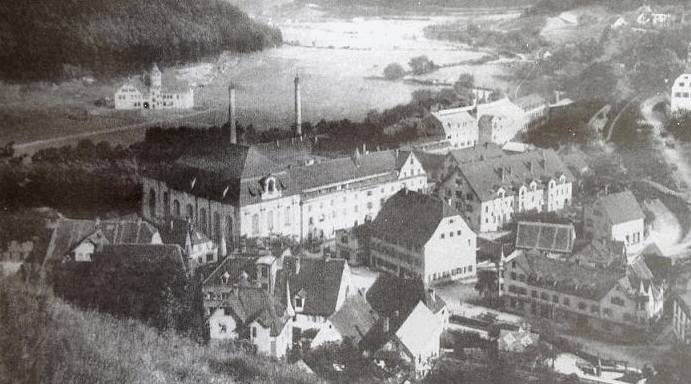
Mauser factory, 1910

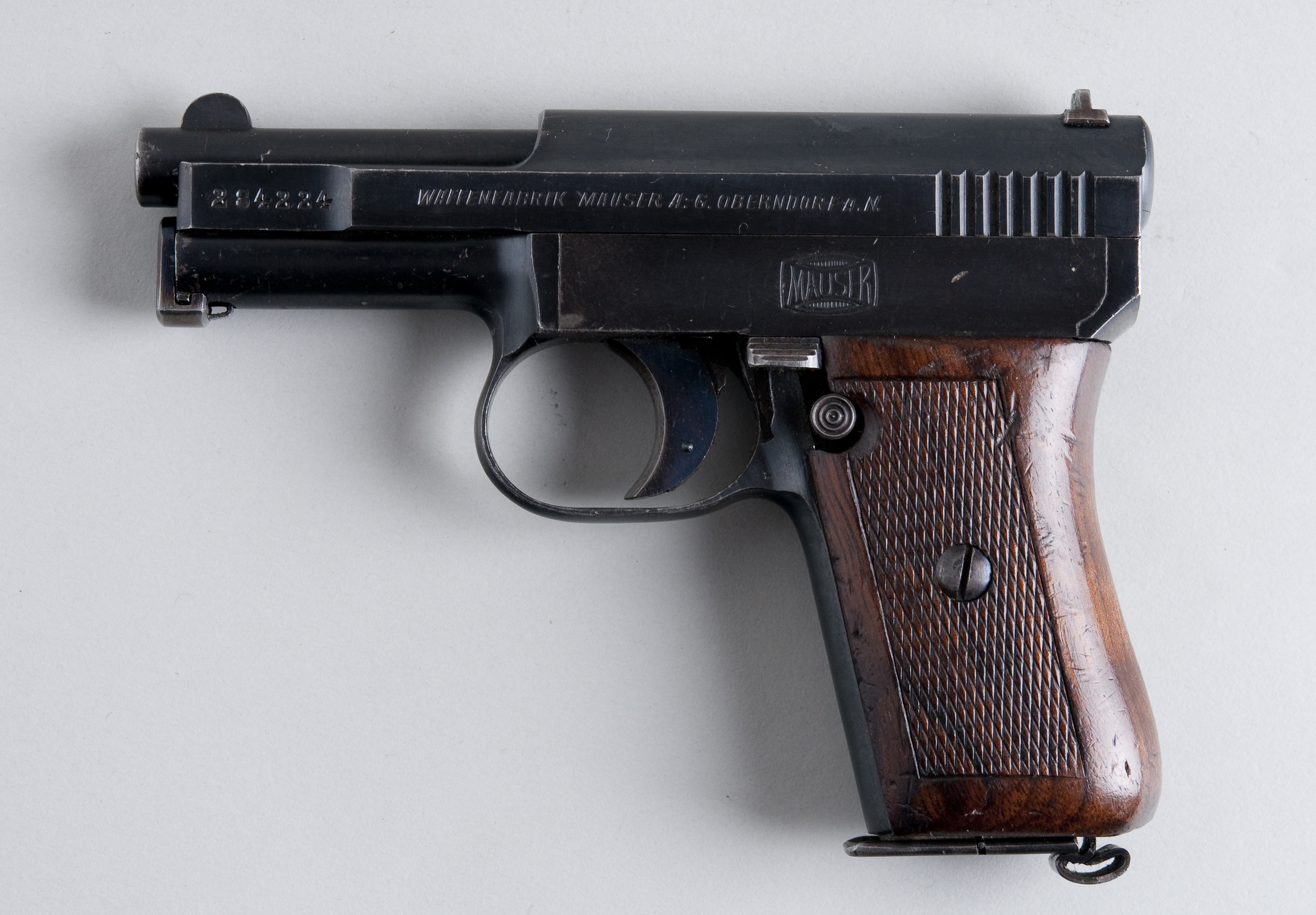
Mauser 1910

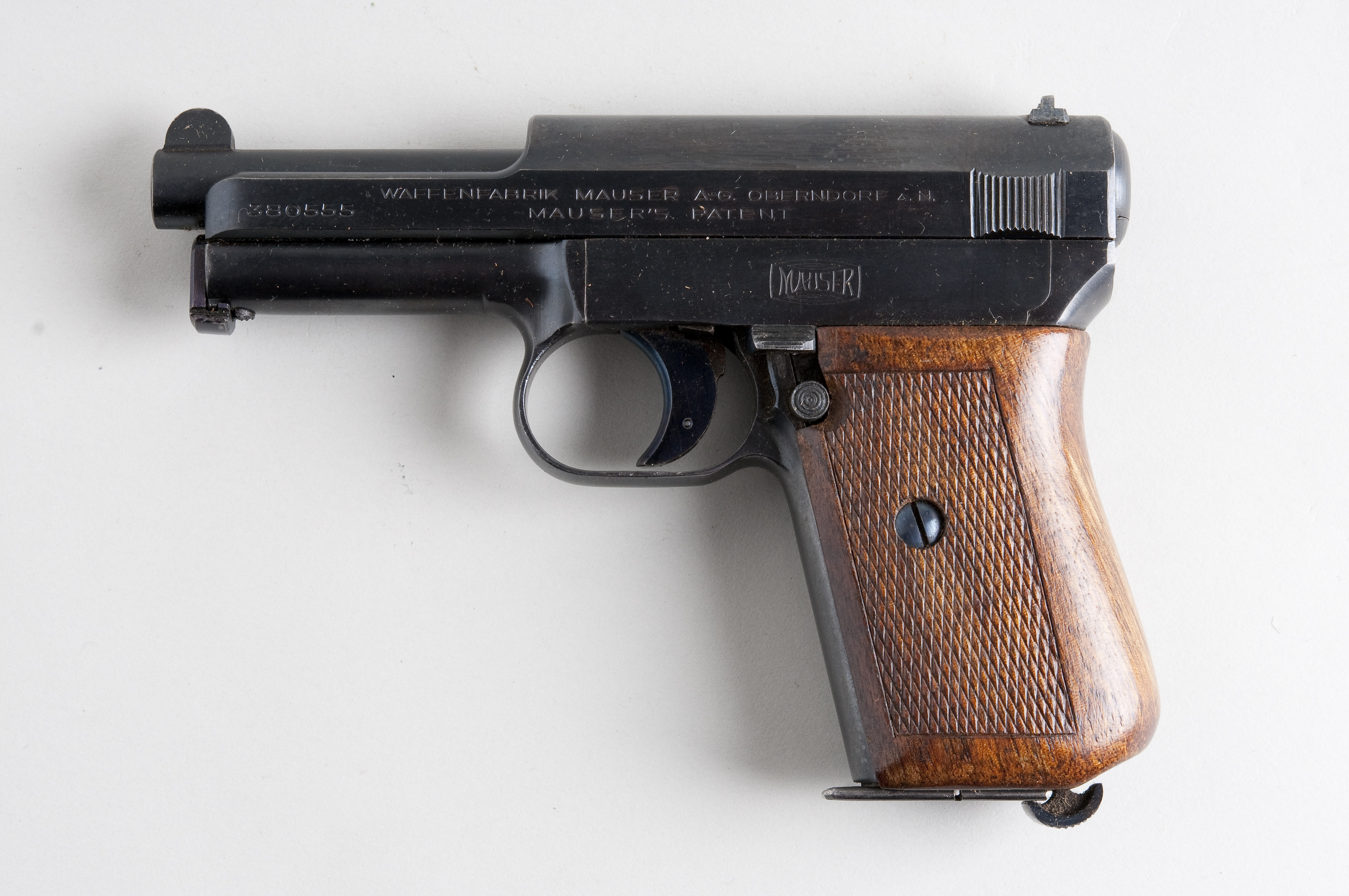
Mauser 1914

The Mauser Model 1910 was a small self-loading pistol chambered for .25 ACP (6.35 mm). It was introduced in 1910; an updated model chambered for .32 ACP (7.65 mm), the Mauser Model 1914, came out in 1914. Most of these were used by the Wehrmacht and the Kriegsmarine. They were also sold commercially.

==== Mauser Model 1934 pocket pistol ====
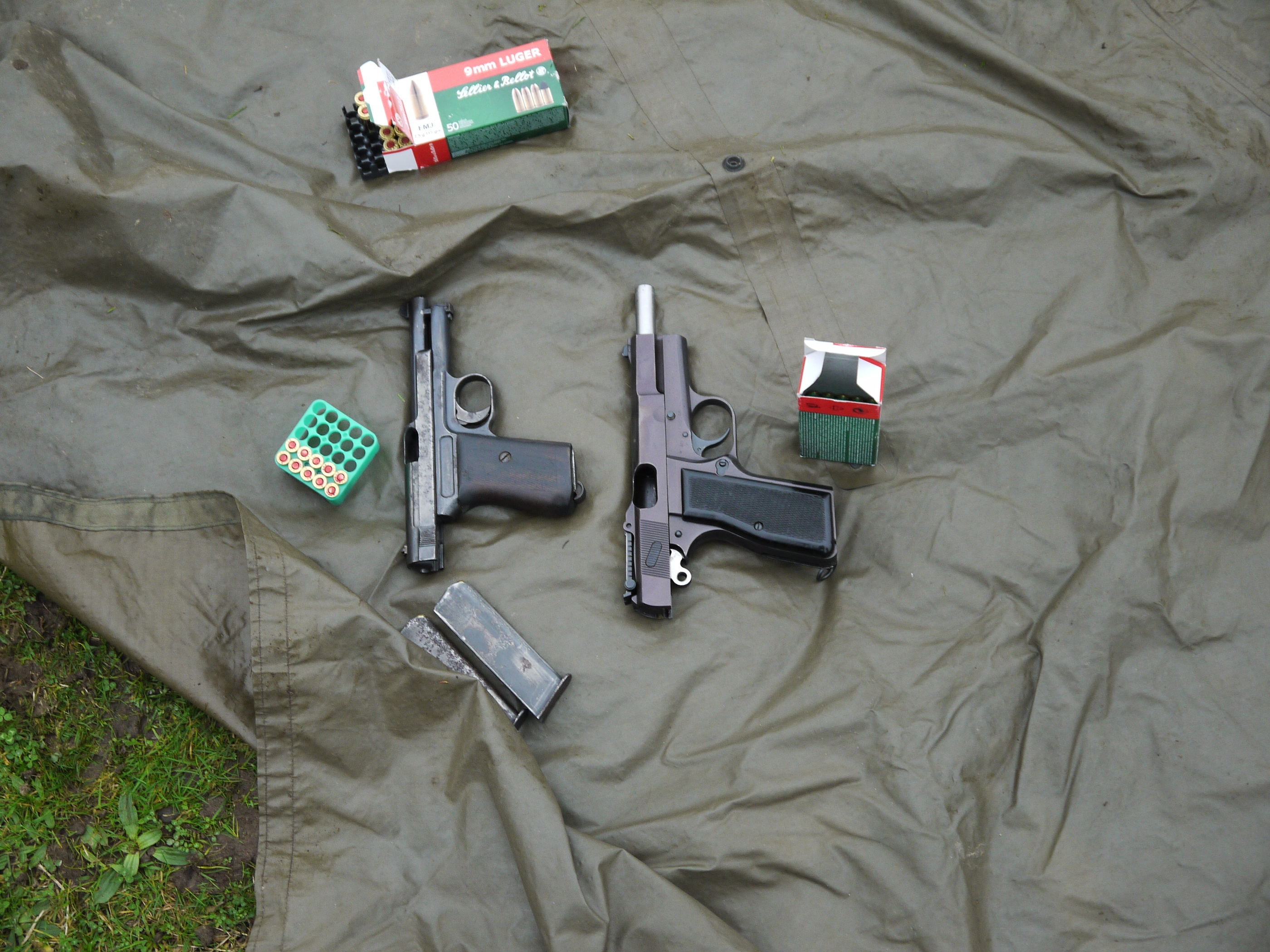
left: 7.65 mm 1934 Model pocket pistol, right: Browning 9 mm (for comparison)

This was a small pocket pistol chambered for .32 ACP (7.65 mm) based on the earlier Model 1910/14. The Mauser Model 1934 is virtually identical to the 1914 except for the grip, which has a more curved back. It was used by the Kriegsmarine and was also sold commercially.

==== Mauser HSc ====
The Mauser HSc was a self-loading handgun introduced in the 1940s. It was a compact double-action blowback design in .32 ACP. Production ran from 1940 until the end of World War II, and into the 1960s and early 1970s. The post-war models were also available in .380 ACP.

=== After 1940 ===
In 1940, the Mauser Company was invited to take part in a competition to re-equip the German Army with a semi-automatic rifle, the Gewehr 41. A number of impractical requirements were specified, including that the design should not use holes drilled into the barrel to take off gas for the operating mechanism, thereby requiring mechanisms that proved unreliable. Two designs were submitted, and the Mauser version, the G 41(M), failed miserably in testing. It was canceled after a short production run. The resulting design did not see real success before it was switched to a simpler gas-operated system in the Gewehr 43. During World War II, the Mauser factory in Oberndorf, a major source of German arms production for the Reich, was strategically bombed by the Allies, resulting in the deaths of 26 workers and the destruction of the company's power plant. French forces entered Oberndorf (which they subsequently occupied for some time) on 20 April 1945 when the town's mayor and planning committee surrendered.

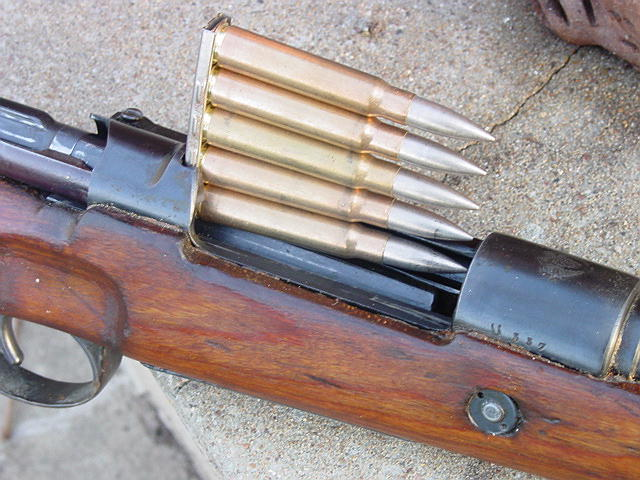
Mauser K98K stripper clip with 8×57mm rounds

After the war in Europe, the factory was briefly put back in order to produce weapons for the now under-equipped French military. The plant was dismantled by the occupying forces for the purpose of war reparations, most factory buildings (approximately 60% in total) were demolished and the records destroyed on orders of the local French Army commander. For a number of years, Mauser Werke manufactured precision measurement instruments and tools, such as micrometers. Edmund Heckler, Theodor Koch, and Alex Seidel, former Mauser engineers, saved what they could and founded Heckler & Koch, which has since become Germany's main small-arms manufacturer. Mauser continued to make hunting and sporting rifles. In 1994, it became a subsidiary of Rheinmetall, a manufacturer of autocannons such as the Mauser BK-27 and other munitions until 2004, when it was merged into Rheinmetall Waffe Munition GmbH. In 1999 the civilian manufacture of hunting, defense, and sporting rifles were split off from Rheinmetall.

== Mauser ammunition ==
Paul Mauser designed the 7.65×53mm Mauser (1889) and 7×57mm Mauser (1892) rifle cartridges. These cartridges were chambered in military Mauser service rifles and were high-performance service cartridge designs compared to other contemporary smokeless powder service cartridges such as the 8mm Lebel (1886), 8×50mmR Mannlicher (1890) and .303 British (1891). Mauser also developed the 6.5×57mm, about 1890, and the 6×57mm, about 1895, both not used by any military, but saw use as hunting cartridges. The 6.5×57mm probably influenced the design of several 6.5 military cartridges. The 6×57mm became obsolete, though the commercial 6mm Remington cartridge is similar.

== Mauser firearms after 1945 ==
Mauser was formally re-established in the 1950s.

=== 1960s ===
A rifle design by Walter Gehmann was purchased, and it went into production in 1965 as the model 66. Some self-loading pistols were also offered, such as the Mauser HSc.

- Model 66
- Model 66 S
- Model 66 P

=== 1970s–1990 ===
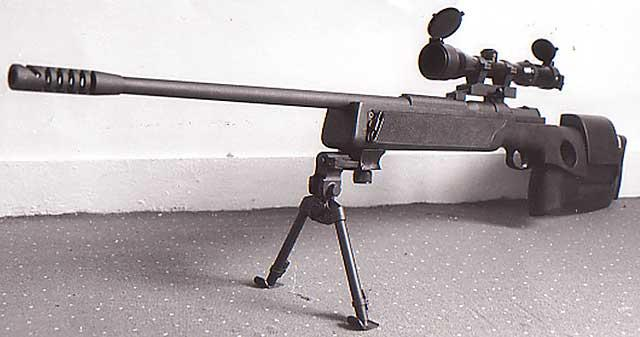
Mauser SP66 sniper rifle

- Model 77
- Model 86 SR
- Mauser SP66 – a sniper rifle based on the Model 66. A further upgraded model was the Mauser 86 SR.
- Mauser Parabellum

=== 1990–2004 ===
In 1995, the firearms division of Mauser was bought by Rheinmetall Berlin AG. The sale was completed in 1996 and the company was renamed Mauser-Werke Oberndorf Waffensysteme GmbH. Rheinmetall Berlin AG was renamed Rheinmetall AG in the same year.

In 1999, part of Mauser was sold to Schweizerische Industrie Gesellschaft (SIG), which is no longer in the arms industry. This part became Mauser Jagdwaffen GmbH. In 2000, Mauser Jagdwaffen GmbH was sold to Lüke & Ortmeier Gruppe during the divestiture by SIG of all its firearms businesses.

In 2004, Rheinmetall Waffen Munition GmbH was formed by a merger of Mauser-Werke Oberndorf Waffensysteme GmbH with Rheinmetall W & M GmbH, Buck Neue Technologien GmbH, Pyrotechnik Silberhütte GmbH and the NICO pyrotechnics Hanns-Jürgen Diederichs GmbH & Co. KG.

- Mauser SR 93 sniper rifle
- Model 94
- Model 96 / model 96 S – a straight pull action rifle
- Mauser SR 97
- Mauser 80SA – a Browning Hi-Power clone manufactured by Fegyver- és Gépgyár (FÉG) and finished by Mauser
- Mauser 90DA – a DA/SA Hi-Power derivative, also manufactured by FÉG

== Autocannons ==
Pre–World War II
20 mm FlaK 30/38 cannon
20 mm MG FF cannon—derivative in 1936 by Ikaria Werke Berlin of Swiss Oerlikon FF
20 mm MG 151 cannon/20
20 mm MG 213 cannon—developed during war but not put into production
30 mm MK 108 cannon developed in 1940 by Rheinmetall-Borsig

Post–World War II
27 mm BK-27 cannon
30 mm RMK30 cannon

== See also ==
- Heym Express Magnum
- Mauser M18
- Antique gun

== Bibliography ==
- España (1969). Folleto descriptivo del Mosquetón Mauser 7,62, trasformado de 7 mm (in Spanish) (2nd ed.). Madrid: s.n. OCLC 431926353.
- "C96 Broomhandle". mauserguns.com. Archived from the original on April 22, 2012.
- Olson, Ludwig Elmer (1976) [1950]. Mauser Bolt Rifles (3rd ed.). Montezuma, Iowa: F. Brownell & Son. ISBN 978-0-9767409-4-0.
- Sams, Stanhope (August 1, 1898). "The Krag-Jorgensen Gun: It Is Inferior in Many Respects to the Mauser Used by the Spaniards" (PDF). The New York Times.
- Smith, W. H. B. (1990) [1946]. Mauser Rifles and Pistols. Prescott, Arizona: Wolfe Publishing Company. ISBN 978-0-935632-94-1.
- Venola, Richard (September 23, 2010). "Plezier Mauser". RifleShooter.
