= Breithaupt =

Breithaupt is a surname. Notable people with the surname include:

- August Breithaupt (1791–1873), German mineralogist
- Don Breithaupt (born 1961), Canadian musician
- Jim Breithaupt (1934–2018), Canadian politician
- Louis Breithaupt (tanner) (1827–1880), German-born tanner and politician in Ontario, Canada
- Louis Jacob Breithaupt (1855–1939), manufacturer and politician in Ontario, Canada
- Louis Orville Breithaupt (1890–1960), politician and Lieutenant Governor of Ontario
- Scot Breithaupt (1957–2015), American entrepreneur

The name may also refer to:

- Breithaupt v. Abram, a 1957 case in which the Supreme Court of the United States held that in some circumstances, involuntary blood samples may be used as evidence in criminal prosecutions
