= 7.65mm Roth–Sauer =

Type of centerfire cartridge

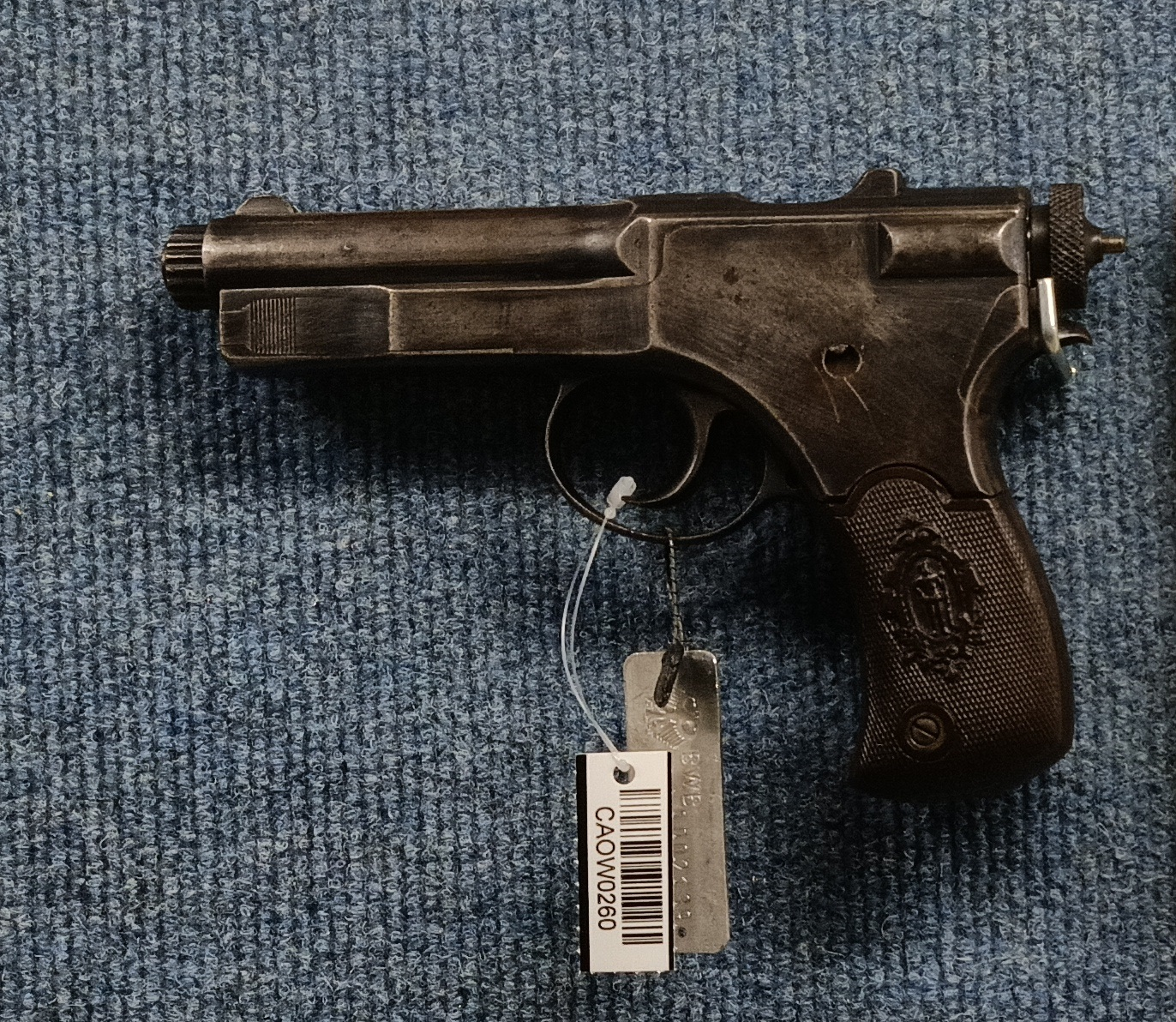
- Roth-Sauer pistol
- Type: Semi-automatic pistol
- Place of origin: Germany, Hungary

Service history
- Wars: World War I

Production history
- Designer: Karel Krnka
- Designed: 1901
- Manufacturer: J.P. Sauer & Sohn (Note: After the company bought the patent for the Roth-Sauer design, and was manufactured in Suhl, Germany.)
- Produced: 1905 to 1910
- No. built: approximately 4,000 units
- Variants: Roth-Steyr M1907 (Note: The 7.65mm Roth-Sauer was later redesigned by others to chamber a different cartridge called 8mm Steyr and was adopted by the Austrian military as the Roth-Steyr M1907. J.P. Sauer & Sohn also developed its own, completely different, blowback-operated Model 1913 pistol in the 7.65mm Browning (.32 ACP) caliber, which is a different cartridge from the 7.65mm Roth-Sauer round)

Specifications
- Case type: Rimless, straight
- Bullet diameter: .30 in (7.6 mm)
- Neck diameter: .332 in (8.4 mm)
- Base diameter: .335 in (8.5 mm)
- Rim diameter: .335 in (8.5 mm)
- Rim thickness: .043 in (1.1 mm)
- Case length: 0.51 in (13 mm)
- Overall length: 0.84 in (21 mm)

Ballistic performance
Bullet mass/type	Velocity	Energy
71 gr (5 g) FMJ	820 ft/s (250 m/s)	106 ft⋅lbf (144 J)
- Source: "Textbook of Automatic Pistols"

The 7.65mm Roth–Sauer is a centerfire cartridge resembling a shortened .32 ACP. Two self-loading pocket pistols were designed for this cartridge. One was manufactured by Roth-Sauer of Germany, and the other by Frommer of Hungary.

The Roth-Sauer pistol was named for its Austrian patentee Georg Roth, but was developed by Czech designer Karel Krnka. It was produced in small quantities (probably less than 3000) by J P Sauer & Sohn of Suhl in Germany during the early 1900s. It employed a notably complex long-recoil mechanism to fire a unique 7.65 x 13mm cartridge. It bears similarities to other designs by Krnka, the most famous of which was Roth-Steyr adopted for service by the Austro-Hungarian Army. The striker firing mechanism is also of interest, in that it foreshadows the system used in modern double-action striker-fired pistols such as the Glock.

The markings on some of the surviving pistols suggest that they were used by the Berlin police and also Landes polizei for the German colony of South West Africa.
