= Mechanical repeating pistol =

Handguns capable of repeated fire that require manual cycling between shots

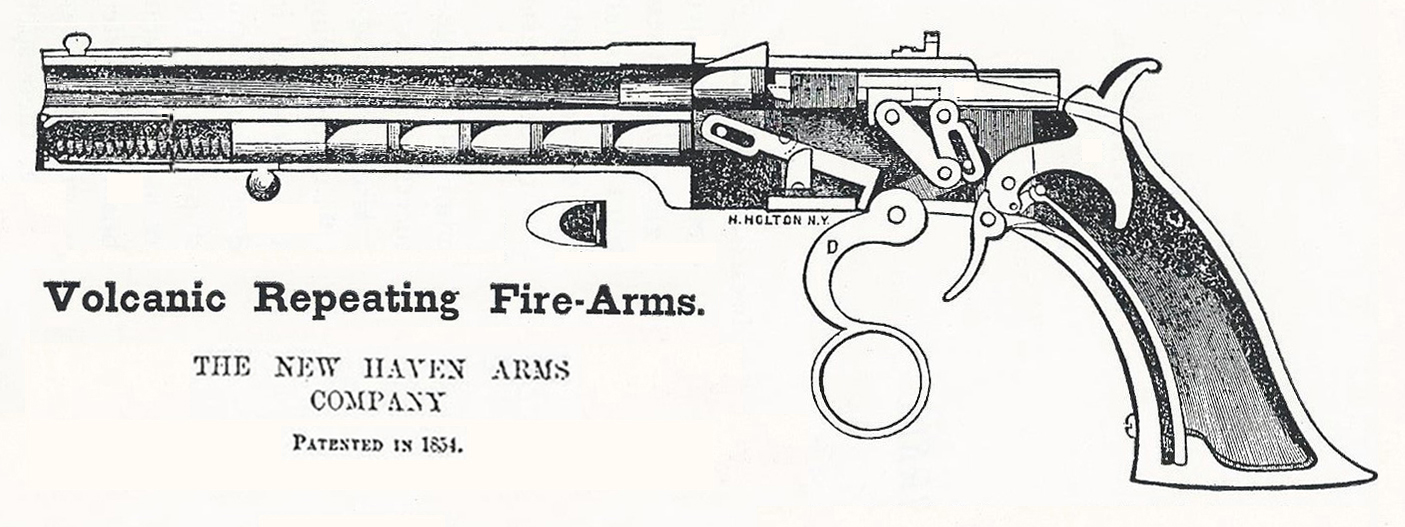
The Volcanic pistol, an early mechanical repeating pistol

A mechanical repeating pistol is a type of repeating handgun that is capable of repeated firings before the gun has to be reloaded, but requires manual operation of a mechanism to cycle each round. Unlike semi-automatic pistols, which use the energy of firing to cycle the action automatically, mechanical repeating pistols require the shooter to manipulate a lever, trigger guard or similar mechanism between shots. They are sometimes referred to as lever-action pistols or manual repeating pistols.

These pistols appeared mainly during the mid-19th and late 19th centuries, when firearms designers were experimenting with ways to increase the rate of fire of handguns before smokeless powder and reliable self-loading mechanisms had been developed. Although inventive, most mechanical repeating pistols were commercially unsuccessful and not adopted for military service. They were replaced by semi-automatic pistols in the 1890s. Manual repeating pistols represent a distinct transitional stage between revolvers and semi-automatic pistols.

== History ==
Attempts to create mechanical repeating handguns date as far back as the 17th century, though manufacturing and technological limitations resulted in these attempts being largely impractical. These designs have virtually no influence on later pistols. By the mid 19th-century, revolvers as a practical repeating handgun were already widespread, popularized by Samuel Colt's early patented revolver designs, most notably the Colt Paterson, Walker and Dragoon series of revolvers. The Colt's Patent Firearms Manufacturing Company had a monopoly on revolvers in the United States. However, reloading these revolvers was a tedious process as they used loose powder, pistol ball, and percussion caps. Most models of the time could also only hold 5 or 6 rounds.

=== Volcanic pistol ===
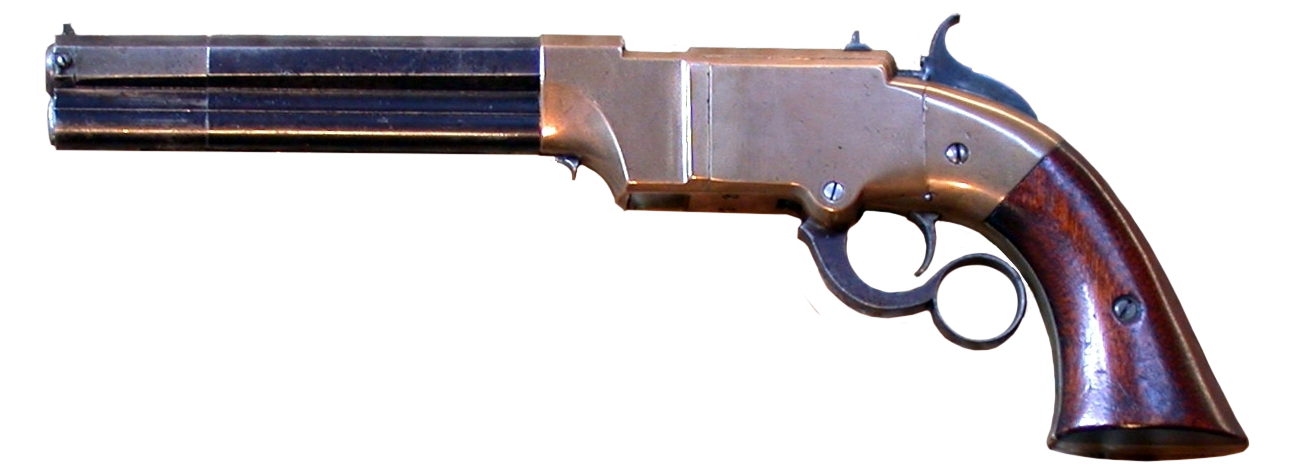
A Navy Model .41 caliber 6-inch barrel Volcanic pistol

The Volcanic pistol is one of the first significant mechanical repeating pistol designs. It was developed in the 1850s by Horace Smith and Daniel B. Wesson (Smith & Wesson). It utilized prior work on repeating rifle mechanism and shared many features with the Volcanic rifle. These firearms were manufactured by the short-lived Volcanic Repeating Arms Company, which was succeeded by the more influential Winchester Repeating Arms Company and Smith & Wesson Revolver Company.

Smith & Wesson based their design of the Volcanic pistol on Walter Hunt's Rocket Ball ammunition and lever action mechanism. The Rocket Ball represented one of the first metallic cartridge designs that had the bullet and powder contained in a single metal-cased unit. The Volcanic pistol used a spring-driven tubular magazine beneath the barrel, a breech bolt and lifter that moved cartridges into the chamber. A lever integrated with the trigger guard was used to manipulate the next cartridge. Opening the lever retracted the breech to raise a round from the magazine, closing the lever would push the round into the chamber.

The Volcanic design, while innovative, was limited by its ammunition, which used black powder. The fouling caused by the powder made the pistol unreliable, and ballistics were typically poor due to the small amount of powder in a cartridge. Production of the Volcanic pistol ceased in 1860.

Fouling was the main obstacle that limited both mechanical repeating pistols and the development of early semi-automatic pistols. Before the development of smokeless powder, black powder cartridges left significant amounts of residue in barrels and mechanisms, jamming moving parts.

=== European development ===
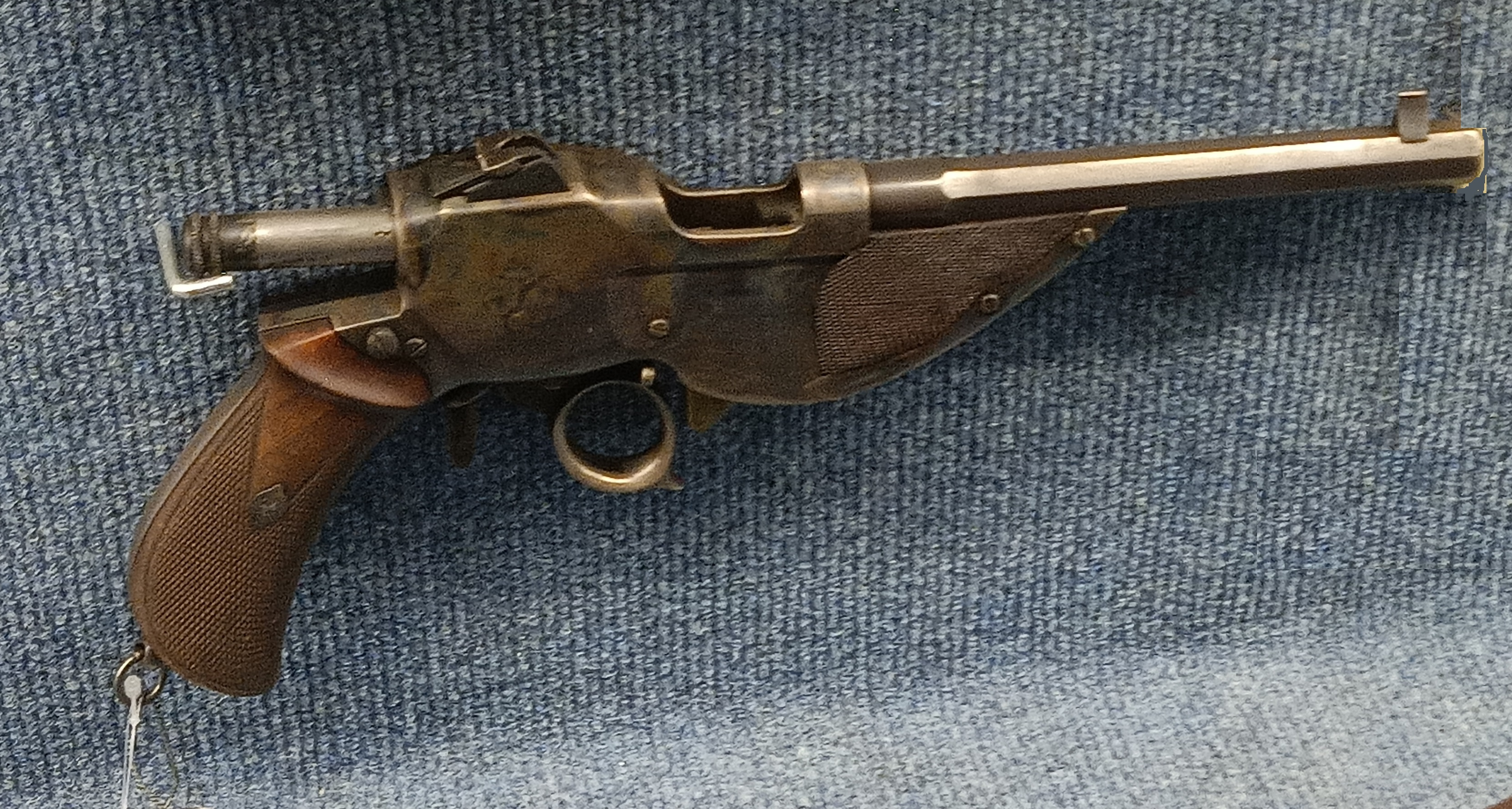
A 7.7mm caliber Bittner pistol with the bolt opened at the Bundeswehr Museum of German Defense Technology

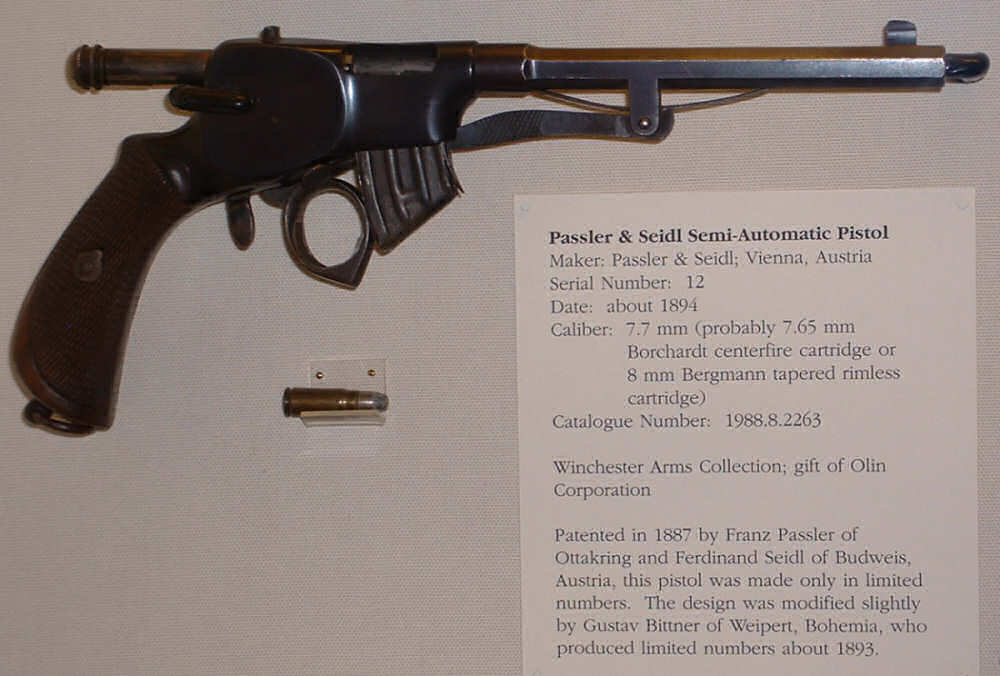
A Passler & Seidl pistol at the Cody Firearms Museum, incorrectly labelled as semi-automatic

Influenced by the Volcanic pistol, European gunsmiths and designers independently developed several mechanical repeating pistol designs in the late 19th century. Most utilized a forward-moving trigger guard/lever to cycle the action. Notable designs include:

- Marius Berger (1880/1881)
- Rudolf Osterreich (1884)
- Josef Schulhof (1884, 1887)
- Paul Mauser (1886)
- Karel Krnka (1886)
- Erwin Reiger (1886)
- Franz Passler and Ferdinand Seidl (1887)
- Joseph Laumann (1890, 1891)
- Louis Schlegelmilch (1891)
- Gustav Bittner (1893)
- Philippe H. Counet's repeating pistol

Aside from Mauser, Schlegelmilch and Osterreich, who were German, Berger, who was French and Counet, who was Belgian (two additional unidentified pistol models also exist at the Musée d'Armes at Liege), these designs originated from Austria-Hungary, particularly Bohemia (part of modern-day Czechia). The earliest semi-automatic pistol models, the Schönberger-Laumann 1892, Salvator Dormus pistol, Roth–Theodorovic pistol and Mannlicher M1894 also originated from Austria-Hungary, which emerged as an important center of early automatic pistol development. The Schönberger-Laumann 1892 in particular was a simple blowback self-loading adaptation of Laumann's 1891 mechanical repeating pistol.

These mechanical repeating pistols did not secure military contracts and were produced in limited quantities for the commercial market. Some designs (Osterreich, Berger, Schulhof, Mauser) utilized tubular magazines similar to the Volcanic, while the Counet, Krnka and Reiger models had rotary magazines. The Laumann, Passler & Seidl and Bittner pistols used Mannlicher M1888 style 5-round en-bloc clips. The 7.7mm Bittner model of 1893, which was based on the Passler & Seidl design and fabricated by Gustav Bittner of Weipert, Bohemia, represented the most widely distributed and successful of the European mechanical repeater pistols.

Unlike most of these pistols, which require a forward push of a lever to eject a case, and a rearward pull to load and fire a cartridge, the Berger and Schlegelmilch designs can be fired by simply pulling a long trigger that completes the entire cycle. However, neither were true semi-automatic pistols as they do not utilize the energy from a fired cartridge to operate, and are purely mechanical.

These designs of mechanical repeating pistols were ultimately not commercially successful due to the appearance of truly self-loading pistols utilizing cleaner smokeless powder, which notably include the Borchardt C‑93, Bergmann 1896 and Mauser C96, followed by the FN M1900 designed in 1898 by John Browning.

== Bibliography ==
- Ezell, Edward C. (1981). Handguns of the world: Military revolvers and self-loaders from 1870 to 1945. Harrisburg, Pa: Stackpole Books. ISBN 978-0-8117-0816-6.
