= Chauchat =

French automatic rifle/Light machine gun

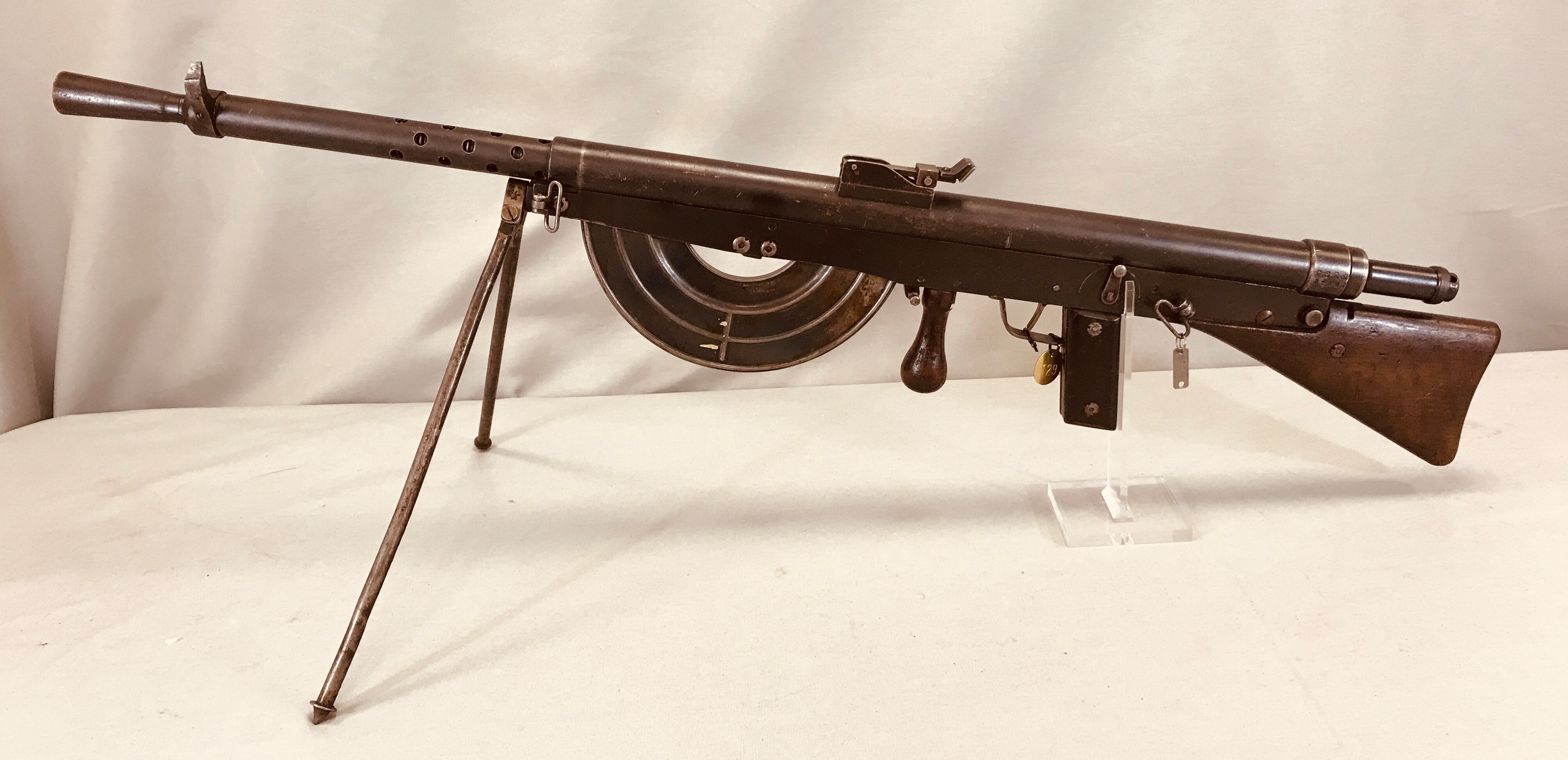
- Type: Light machine gun Automatic rifle
- Place of origin: France

Service history
- In service: 1915–1948
- Used by: See § Users
- Wars: World War I; Russian Civil War; Polish–Soviet War; Greco-Turkish War; Rif War; Spanish Civil War; World War II; 1948 Arab–Israeli War

Production history
- Designer: Louis Chauchat; Charles Sutter
- Designed: 1907
- Manufacturer: Gladiator; SIDARME
- Produced: 1915–1922
- No. built: Approx. 262,000
- Variants: Chauchat Mle 1918 (US); Wz 15/27 (Poland); FM 15/27 (Belgium)

Specifications
- Mass: 9.07 kg (20.0 lb)
- Length: 1,143 mm (45.0 in)
- Barrel length: 470 mm (19 in)
- Cartridge: 8×50mmR Lebel; .30-06 Springfield; 7.92×57mm Mauser; 7.65×53mm Mauser
- Action: Long recoil with gas assist
- Rate of fire: 300 – 400 rounds/min
- Muzzle velocity: 630 m/s (2,100 ft/s)
- Effective firing range: 200 m (220 yd)
- Maximum firing range: 2,000 m (2,200 yd)
- Feed system: French pattern: 20-round semi-circle magazine (Note: Usually only loaded to 16–18 rounds due to feeding issues.); US pattern: 16-round curved box magazine; Belgian pattern: 20-round curved box magazine
- Sights: Iron sights

The Chauchat (French pronunciation: [ʃoʃa], shoh-sha) was the standard light machine gun or "machine rifle" of the French Army during World War I (1914–18). Its official designation was "Fusil Mitrailleur Modèle 1915 CSRG" ("Machine Rifle Model 1915 CSRG"). Beginning in June 1916, it was placed into regular service with French infantry, where the troops called it the FM Chauchat, after Colonel Louis Chauchat, the main contributor to its design. The Chauchat in 8mm Lebel was also used in 1917–18 by the American Expeditionary Forces (A.E.F.) (who notoriously hated it for its unreliability and jokingly nicknamed it the "Sho-Sho") where it was officially designated as the "Automatic Rifle, Model 1915 (Chauchat)". A total of 262,000 Chauchats were manufactured between December 1915 and November 1918, including 244,000 chambered for the 8mm Lebel service cartridge, making it the most widely manufactured automatic weapon of World War I. The armies of eight other nations—Belgium, Finland, Greece, Italy, Poland, Romania, Russia, and Serbia—also used the Chauchat machine rifle in fairly large numbers during and after World War I.

The Chauchat was one of the first light, automatic rifle-caliber weapons designed to be carried and fired by a single operator and an assistant, without a heavy tripod or a team of gunners. It set a precedent for several subsequent 20th-century firearm projects, being a portable, yet full-power automatic weapon built inexpensively and in very large numbers. The Chauchat combined a pistol grip, an in-line stock, a detachable magazine, and a selective fire capability in a compact package of manageable weight (20 pounds, 9 kilograms) for a single soldier. Furthermore, it could be routinely fired from the hip and while walking (marching fire). The Chauchat is the only mass-produced fully automatic weapon actuated by long recoil, a Browning-designed system already applied in 1906 to the Remington Model 8 semi-automatic rifle: extraction and ejection of the empties takes place when the barrel returns forward, while the bolt is retained in the rear position. Afterwards the barrel trips a lever which releases the bolt and allows it to chamber another round.

The muddy trenches of northern France exposed a number of weaknesses in the Chauchat's design. Construction had been simplified to facilitate mass production, resulting in low quality of many metal parts. The magazines in particular were the cause of about 75% of the stoppages or cessations of fire; they were made of thin metal which was prone to deforming if gripped too tightly and they were open on one side, allowing for the entry of mud and dust. The weapon also ceased to function when overheated, the barrel sleeve remaining in the retracted position until the gun had cooled off. Consequently, in September 1918, barely two months before the Armistice of November 11, the A.E.F. in France had already initiated the process of replacing the Chauchat with the M1918 Browning Automatic Rifle. Shortly after World War I, the French army replaced the Chauchat with the new gas-operated Mle 1924 light machine gun. It was mass manufactured during World War I by two reconverted civilian plants: "Gladiator" and "Sidarme". Besides the 8mm Lebel version, the Chauchat machine rifle was also manufactured in U.S. .30-06 Springfield and in 7.65×53mm Argentine Mauser caliber to arm the American Expeditionary Forces (A.E.F.) and the Belgian Army, respectively. The Belgian military did not experience difficulties with their Chauchats in 7.65mm Mauser and kept them in service into the early 1930s, as did the Polish Army. Conversely, the Chauchat version in U.S. .30-06 made by "Gladiator" for the A.E.F., the Model 1918, proved to be fundamentally defective and had to be withdrawn from service. The Chauchat has a poor reputation in some quarters; the .30-06 version in particular is by some experts considered the worst machine gun ever fielded.

== History ==
The design of the Chauchat dates back to 1903, and its long recoil operation is based on the John Browning-designed Remington Model 8 semi-automatic rifle of 1906, not (as so often repeated in the past) on the later designs (1910) of Rudolf Frommer, the Hungarian inventor of the commercial Frommer Stop pistol. The Chauchat machine rifle project was initiated between 1903 and 1910 in a French Army weapon research facility located near Paris: Atelier de Construction de Puteaux (APX). This development was aiming at creating a very light, portable automatic weapon served by one man only, yet firing the 8 mm Lebel service ammunition. The project was led from the beginning by Colonel Louis Chauchat, a graduate from Ecole Polytechnique, assisted by senior armorer Charles Sutter. Not less than eight trial prototypes were tested at APX, between 1903 and 1909. As a result, a small series (100 guns) of 8 mm Lebel CS (Chauchat-Sutter) machine rifles was ordered in 1911, then manufactured between 1913 and 1914 by Manufacture d'armes de Saint-Étienne (MAS). Because they were light, they were used temporarily during the early part of World War I to arm observation crews on French military aircraft. Only one CS machine rifle is known to have survived in a Prague museum.

In 1914, when World War I broke out, French troops did not operate any light machine gun. It was clear that this type of weapon had become indispensable in modern warfare, because of the increase in firepower it could provide to an infantry section. Spurred by General Joseph Joffre, it was decided to adopt the Chauchat, above all else because the pre-war CS (Chauchat-Sutter) machine rifle was already in existence, thoroughly tested, and designed to fire the 8mm Lebel service ammunition. Furthermore, due to its projected low manufacturing costs and relative simplicity, the newly adopted (1915) CSRG machine rifle could be mass-produced by a converted peacetime industrial plant. The term CSRG is made up of the initials of Chauchat, Sutter, Ribeyrolles and Gladiator, the respective manufacturers. Paul Ribeyrolles was the general manager of the Gladiator company, a peacetime manufacturer of motor cars, motorcycles, and bicycles located in Pre-Saint-Gervais (a northern suburb of Paris). The fairly large Gladiator factory was thus converted into an arms manufacturer in 1915 and became the principal industrial producer of Chauchat machine rifles during World War I. Later on, in 1918, a subsidiary of Compagnie des forges et acieries de la marine et d'Homecourt named SIDARME and located in Saint-Chamond, Loire, also participated in the mass manufacture of CSRGs.

== Design details ==
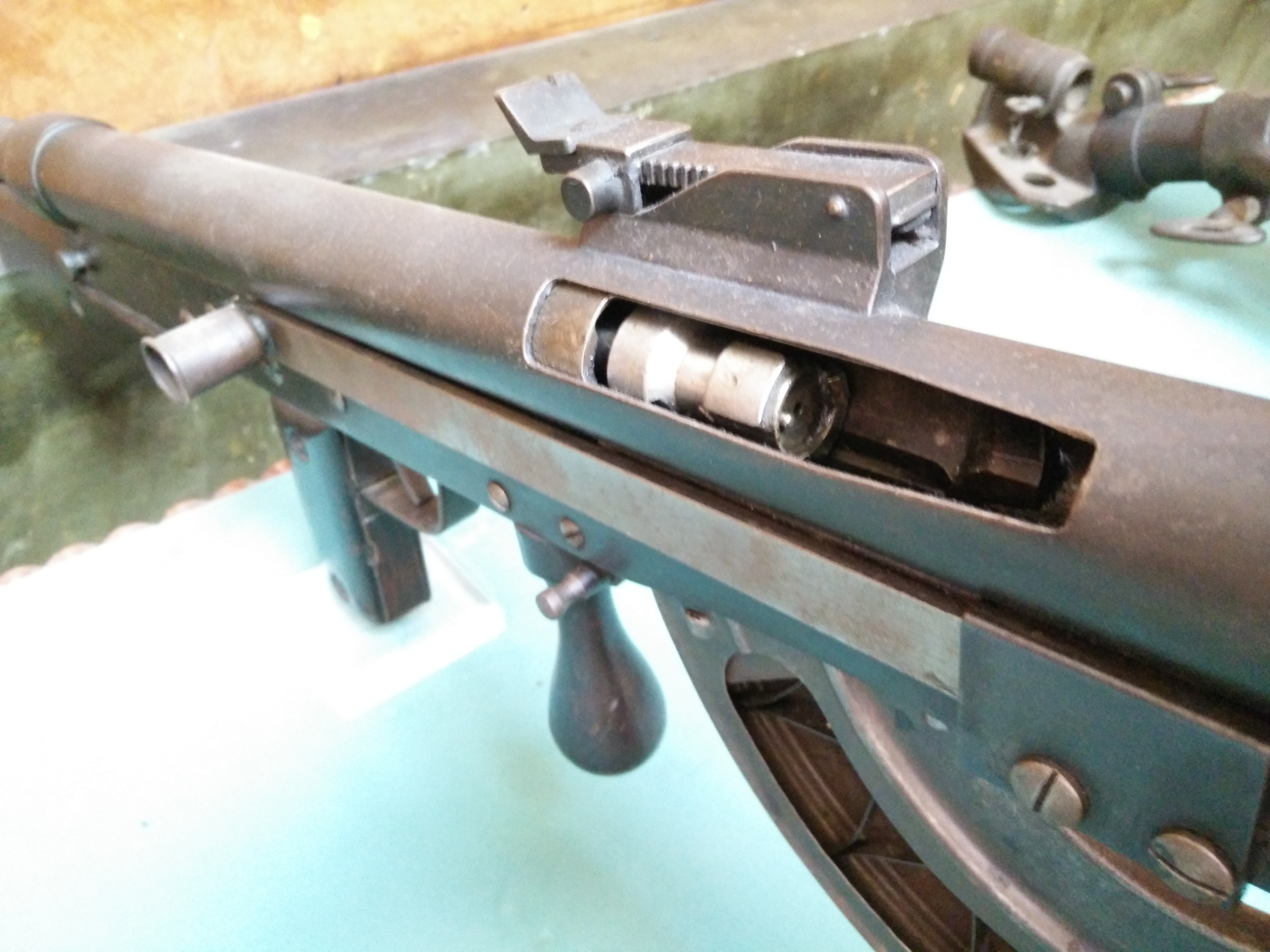
Bolt of the Chauchat machine gun.

The Chauchat machine rifle or "automatic rifle" functioned on the long barrel recoil principle with a gas assist.

The Chauchat machine rifle (CSRG) delivered to the French Army fired the 8mm Lebel cartridge at the slow rate of 240 rounds per minute. At 9 kilograms (20 lb), the gun was much lighter than the contemporary portable light machine guns of the period, such as the 12-kilogram (26 lb) Hotchkiss M1909 Benét–Mercié machine gun and the 13-kilogram (29 lb) Lewis gun. It was a selective fire weapon, either on automatic or semi-automatic mode.

The Chauchat's construction was a mix of new, high quality components, re-used parts proven in other designs, and the shoddy and sub standard. This combination did not help in the reliability of the weapon. The recoiling barrel sleeve, as well as all the bolt moving parts, were precision milled from solid steel and always fully interchangeable. The barrels were standard Lebel rifle barrels that had been shortened from the muzzle end. The barrel radiators were made of ribbed cast aluminum. On the other hand, the outer breech housing was a simple tube, and the rest of the gun was built of stamped metal plates of mediocre quality. Side plate assemblies were held by screws that could become loose after prolonged firings. The sights were always misaligned on the Gladiator-made guns, creating severe aiming problems that had to be corrected by the gunners.

The exact number on record of Chauchat machine rifles manufactured between 1916 and the end of 1918 is 262,300. The Gladiator factory manufactured 225,700 CSRGs in 8 mm Lebel plus 19,000 in the U.S. caliber .30-06 between April 1916 and November 1918. SIDARME manufactured 18,600 CSRGs, exclusively in 8mm Lebel, between October 1917 and November 1918. The SIDARME-manufactured Chauchats were generally better finished and better functioning than those made by Gladiator. The French Army had a stock of 63,000 CSRG's just before the Armistice.

The French military at the time considered the Chauchat's performance as inferior in comparison to the reliable heavy Hotchkiss M1914 machine gun. However, whereas the Hotchkiss was a weighty, tripod-mounted weapon, the Chauchat was a light, portable gun that could be mass-produced quickly, cheaply, and in very large numbers. It was also never intended to take the role of static defense of the heavy machine gun. On the contrary, it was designed to be a light, thus highly portable, automatic weapon that would increase the firepower of infantry squads while they progressed forward during assaults. A significant plus is that it could easily be fired while walking (marching fire), by hanging the Chauchat's sling over a shoulder hook located onto the gunner's upper left side of his Y–strap.

The CSRG 1915 Chauchat was operated with Balle D 8mm ammunition, which was standard for the French until 1932 when they went to an improved Balle N 8mm Lebel cartridge. The Chauchats, as they were retired, were not converted to the Balle N, and as a result, they do not operate well with the Balle N cartridge (French World War I weapons converted to Balle N will have a noticeable "N" markings). Only Balle D 8mm should be used in the Chauchat 1915. The quickest way to identify the different cartridge is that the Balle D bullet is brass colored while the Balle N is a shiny silver.

== French Service ==
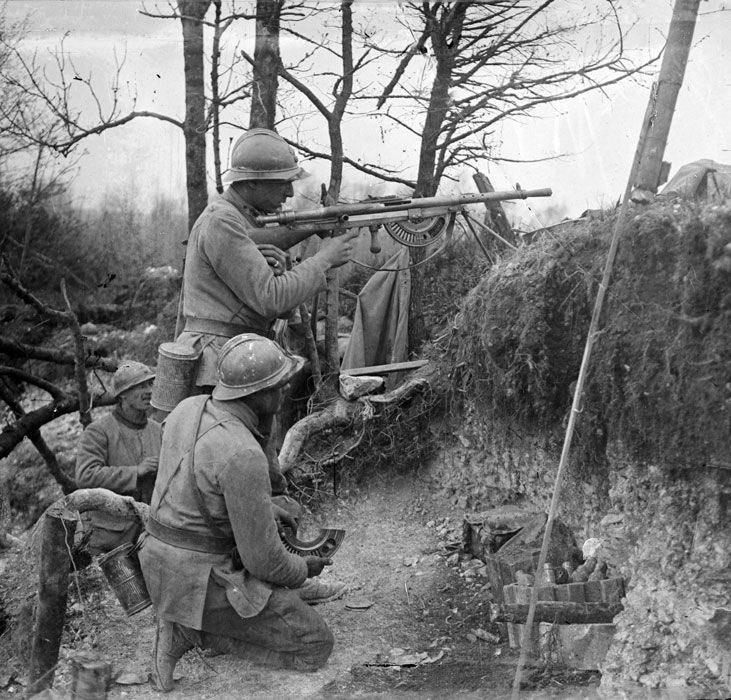
French soldiers with an FM Chauchat, Somme, 1918.

The Mle 1915 Chauchat's performance on the battlefield drew decidedly mixed reviews from the users when the war was stagnating in the mud of the trenches in 1916. This brought about a survey, regiment by regiment, requested by General Pétain in late 1916; the survey's essential conclusion was that the open-sided half-moon magazines were defective and caused about two thirds of all stoppages. For instance, it was a common practice for the gunners to oil up the inside of the magazines to facilitate movement of the 8mm Lebel rounds. Also, loose earth, grit, and other particles easily entered the gun through these open-sided magazines, an ever-present risk in the muddy environment of the trenches. An insistence on using only good, undeformed magazines with strong springs was the most practical solution to this problem. Chauchat gunners were also known to load their magazines with 18 or 19 rounds, instead of the maximum 20, in order to avoid the dreaded first-round failure to feed. The Chauchat's long recoil system is often cited as a source of excessive stress on the gunner when firing, though recent and extensive firing tests have demonstrated that it is the Chauchat's ergonomics and its loose bipod, rather than its recoil, that makes it a difficult gun to keep on target beyond very short bursts. On most of the Gladiator-made guns, the sights also made the Chauchat shoot systematically too low and to the right, a failing which was soon recognized but never corrected. Overheating during uninterrupted periods of full automatic fire (about 120 rounds with the 8mm Lebel version) often resulted in the barrel sleeve assembly locking in the rear position due to thermal expansion, causing stoppage of fire until the gun had cooled off. Hence, French and US Army manuals recommended firing in short bursts or semi-auto. In 1918, the A.E.F. officially labeled the Chauchat in its user manuals as an "automatic rifle", a product of mistranslation of the term "Fusil Mitrailleur", instead of "Machine Gun Rifle", a more accurate description.

=== Improvements ===
Several prototypes of dirt-proof, fully enclosed Chauchat magazines were successfully tested in May and June 1918, but came too late to be placed into service. Stronger open-sided standard magazines, as well as tailored canvas gun covers protecting the gun against mud during transport, had previously been issued in late 1917; as well as a flash hider. The initial two-man Chauchat team was considered effective and grew to a four-man squad by October 1917 (the squad leader, the gunner, the first ammo bearer who handled the magazines plus one additional ammo bearer). Both the gunner and the assistant gunner (pourvoyeur, ammo bearer) carried at all times a .32 ACP Ruby pistol with three magazines, each one loaded with 9 rounds, as part of their regular equipment. The squad leader and the magazine carrier were both equipped with a rifle or with a Berthier carbine. The additional men provided assistance in carrying loaded magazines, helping manage malfunctions, and protecting the gunner, but mainly to carry more ammunition; thus boosting the combat load. This is still the basic layout of a modern infantry squad or fire-team, with the suppressive fire as the center of its combat formations.

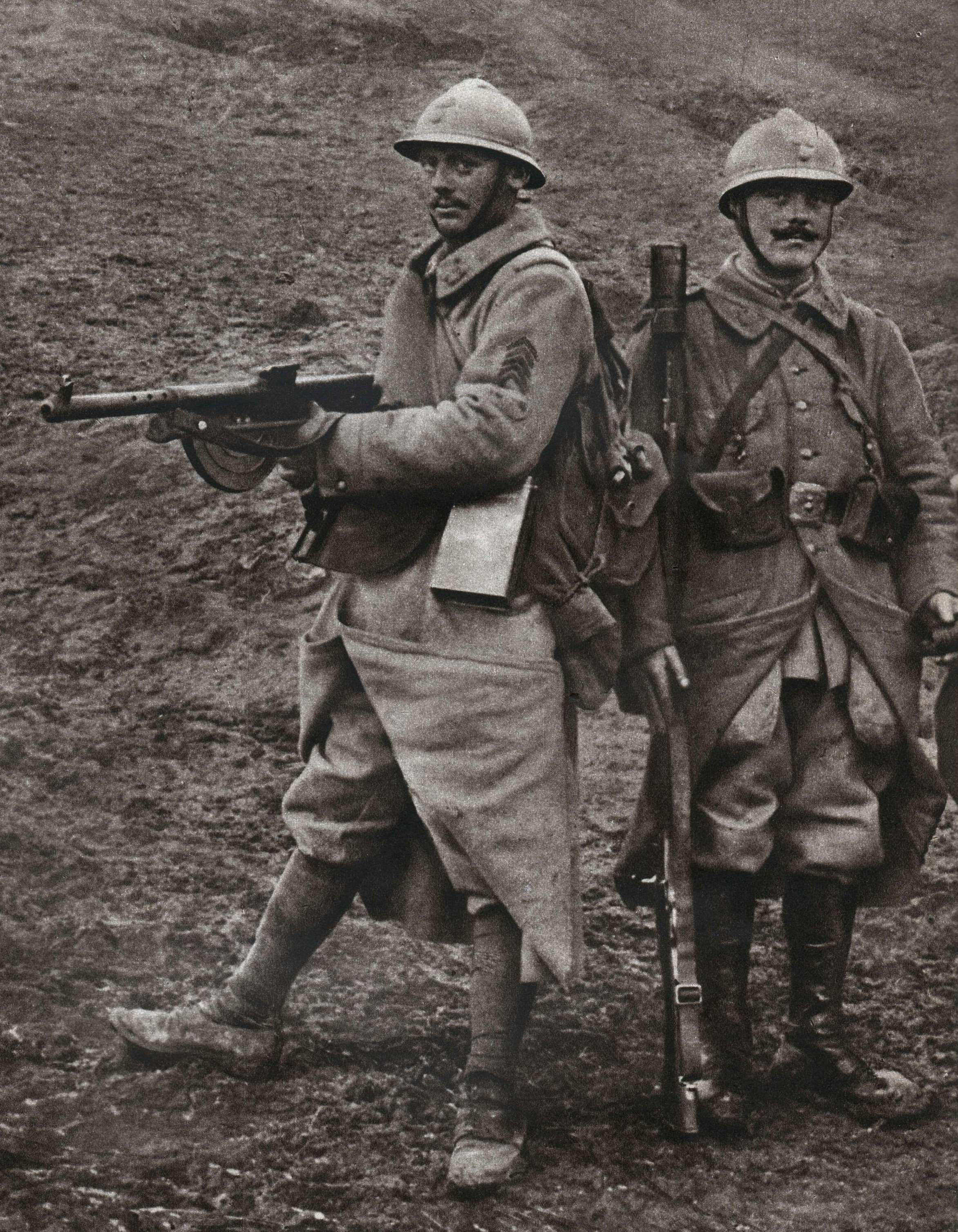
French Chauchat gunner (left) and VB grenade launcher (right), 1918.

=== Tactical Innovation ===
The French infantry section/platoon took its modern form in the years 1916-1918. It was then equipped with six portable light machine guns (Chauchat) and four to six rifle grenade launchers (VB rifle grenade) and its voltigeurs started being equipped with semi-automatic rifles, some with scopes. This differentiation induces an interdependence of the men which increases the psychological resistance superior to that of the aligned bayonet-men of 1914. Above all, the infantry platoon can maneuver other than in line, as an articulated unit at intervals thanks to its autonomous combat groups. The qualitative leap in a few years is enormous and modern squads and platoons still function in the same manner, albeit with more sophisticated equipment such as portable radios and night vision devices.

A specially lightened assault order was introduced in June 1915. The pack was now to be left behind in the second line; instead, rations and spare ammunition were rolled up in a blanket and worn bandolier-style. Steel helmets were standard for the infantry in September 1915, in time for the Champagne offensive; standard issue for other arms occurred in October. Experience at Verdun showed how difficult it was to keep men in the front lines supplied with fresh water, so every man was given a second water bottle and a second haversack to carry necessities for a day or two of unsupported fighting; plus two gas masks (one in the ready position, one in a tin box); tools like an M1909 folding pick/shovel; extra ammunition and grenades, and sandbags for consolidating the objective.

The rifle grenadiers and bombers (hand grenadiers) each carried a special haversack, which held the grenades in individual pouches inside. The rifle grenade cup was carried in its own pouch attached to the user's waistbelt. The men of the new fire and support teams were given new equipment for their spare ammunition. The Chauchat gunners each wore semi-circular pouches on the waistbelt, containing one spare magazine each, as well as a pack containing a further eight magazines and 64 loose rounds, and a haversack containing a further four magazines. Riflemen would be discouraged to fire, as this slowed the advance, their job was to leapfrog while being covered; firing by the platoon and half-platoon was only permitted to cover its own advance or that of a neighbouring platoon, or to deal with enemy pockets on their way.

The principal role of the Chauchat was to provide a mobile barrage during the advance. This required skilled teamwork on the part of the crew, changing the magazines while on the move to keep up the volume of fire. As the center of the tactical device, the Chauchat gunner (tireur) would expect casualties - but also decorations:

"Soldat Carpentier, 20e RI, near Nogentel, Oise, 31 August 1918... he advanced on the enemy, firing while walking, the rest of the platoon led by Sergeant Berthault. He succeed in maneuvering around the flank of an island of resistance and in capturing, with his comrades, four machine guns and twenty-five German gunners".

Carpentier was awarded the Croix de Guerre with palm.

By 1916, French Army tactical methods started emphasizing concentrated firepower and the flexible use of infantry. The experience of Verdun would carry to the Somme, and French units were successful in capturing their objectives at the beginning of the offensive, as well as suffering fewer casualties.

From October 1917 the platoon had two LMG/rifle-grenadier sections, one hand grenade section and one rifle section. This new system would fight the Battle of La Malmaison, from 23 to 27 October, with the French interarms infantry beating back enemy attacks where the German infantry attacked en masse, shoulder to shoulder. At the same battle, General Franchet d'Espèrey the commander of 6th Army, successfully introduced specially trained squads of infantry whose role was to accompany the tanks (chars d'assaut, as they were called). In a series of instructions in 1918, General Philippe Pétain sought to achieve greater cooperation between air power, artillery and tanks, all acting in support of the assaulting infantry; measures which bore fruit in the counter-offensives of summer 1918.

By mid-1918, the Allies managed to restore some degree of mobility to the war and the end of the stalemate on the Western Front; with less muddy trenches and more open fields. Furthermore, French infantry regiments had been reorganized into multiple small (18 men) combat groups ("Demi-Sections de Combat"). The infantry platoon now had a platoon leader and platoon sergeant, formed in two half-platoons commanded by sergeants. The 1st half-platoon had a Grenadier Squad (Corporal, 2x hand grenadiers, 2x grenade carriers, 2x riflemen) and a LMG Squad (Corporal, 3x rifle grenadiers, 2x ammo carriers, 1x LMG gunner), the 2nd half-platoon had a LMG Squad (Corporal, 3x rifle grenadiers, 2x ammo carriers, 1x LMG gunner) and a Rifle Squad (Corporal, 6x riflemen).

The French regimental records and the statistics of medals given to Chauchat gunners document that they were an essential contribution to the success of these updated infantry tactics. Those were applied to suppress enemy machine gun nests, that would be approached by fire on the move, and destroyed by the combined action of Chauchat automatic fire coming from the sides and VB rifle grenades fired from the front, within less than 200 yards (182.9 meters); in military terms, assault distance. Captured terrain would be defended by emplaced Chauchat fire bases suppressing enemy counter-attacks until heavier machine guns could be brought from the rear.

=== Comparison ===
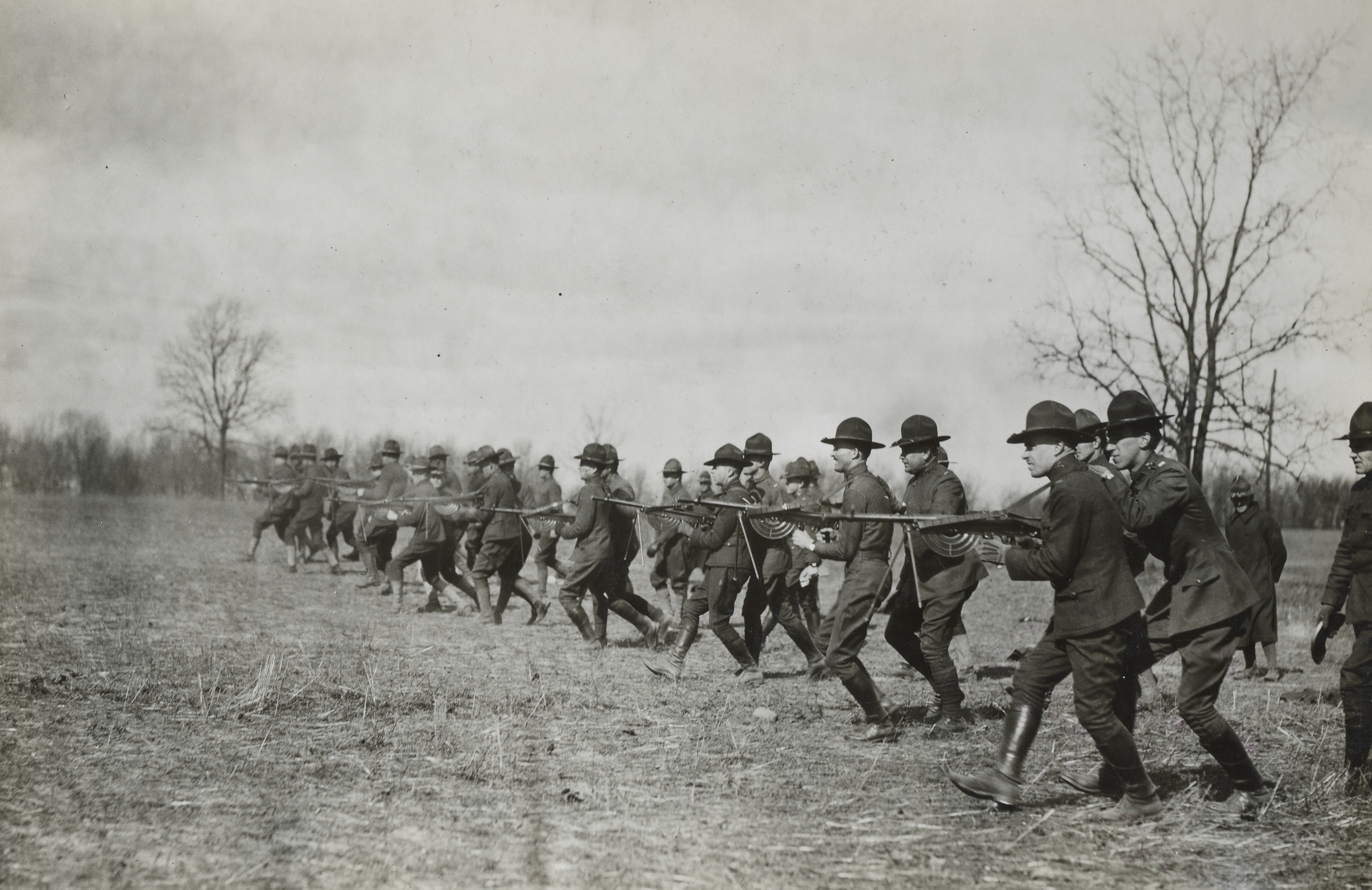
US soldiers practicing marching fire, Fort Custer Training Center, 1919.

Unlike much heavier air- and water-cooled machine guns (such as the Hotchkiss machine gun and the various belt-fed Maxim gun derivatives), and like the Madsen machine gun and Lewis gun, the Chauchat was not designed for sustained defensive fire from fixed positions. The tactical edge expected from the light and portable Chauchat machine rifle was to increase the offensive firepower of advancing infantry during the assaults. This particular tactic became known as marching fire. Colonel Chauchat had already formulated this tactical vision since the early 1900s, in his many proposals to the highest levels of the French military command structure, including General Joffre.

=== Replacement ===
After the Armistice of 11 November 1918, the French military decided to upgrade to a more reliable light squad automatic weapon that would be designed and manufactured nationally. Experimentation was carried out at the Manufacture d'Armes de Châtellerault during the early 1920s, culminating in the adoption of the new light machine gun (in French: fusil-mitrailleur), the FM Mle 1924. Gas-operated, and using a new 7.5 mm rimless cartridge (that would evolve into the 7.5x54mm French), this finally corrected all the problems associated with the Chauchat, and was manufactured in large numbers (232,000) and widely used by the French Army until the late 1950s.

== Other users ==
=== American service ===
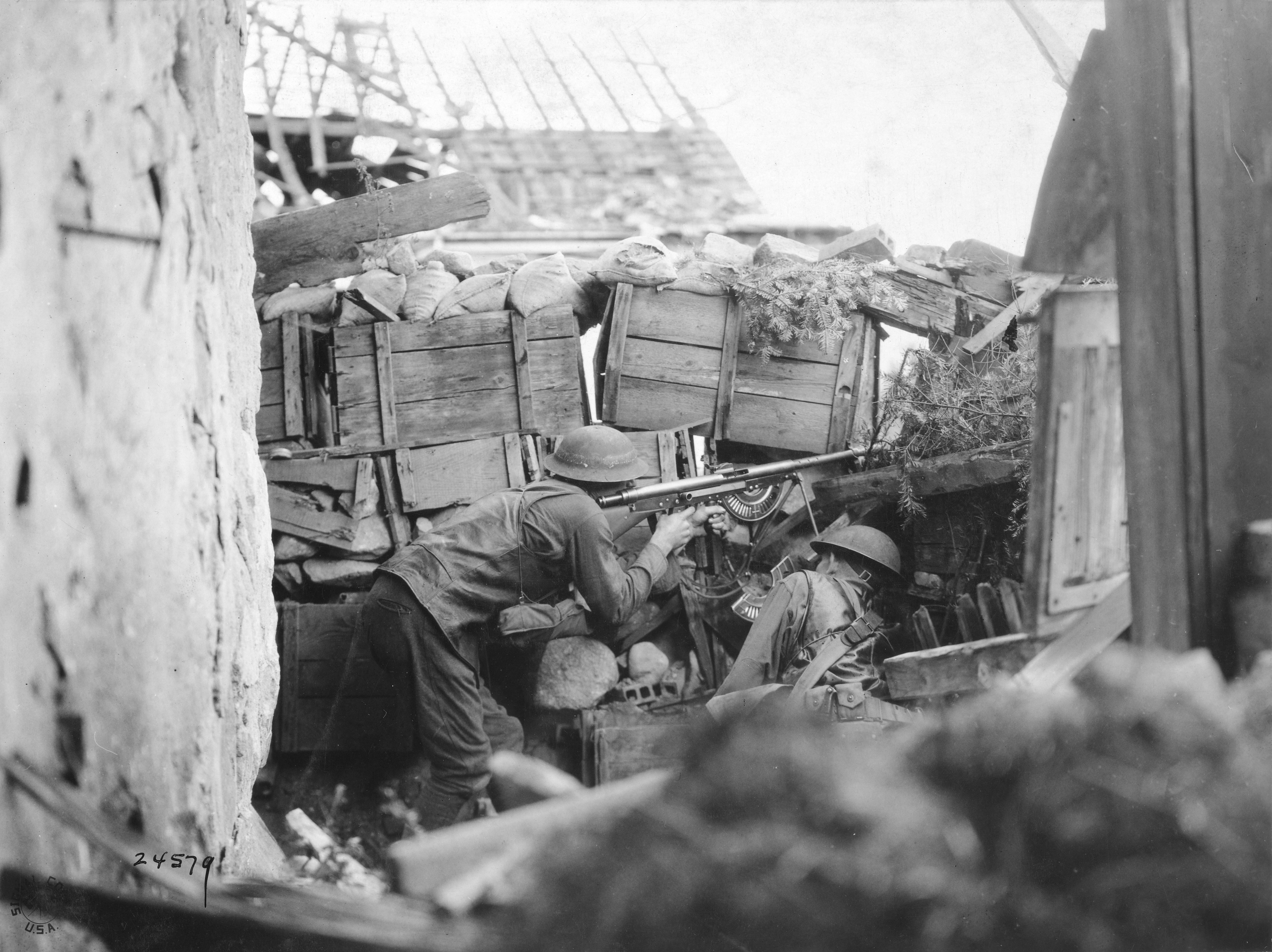
Soldiers of the U.S. 137th Infantry Regiment manning a Chauchat in Alsace, 29 August 1918

While rate of fire restrictions (250 rounds/minute) made the gun manageable in its 8mm Lebel version, the U.S. .30-06 version fired more powerful cartridges that exacerbated the problems of overheating. Furthermore, the 18,000 Chauchats in .30-06 delivered to the A.E.F. were not conversions of the French model. Rather, they were newly manufactured guns which had been delivered directly to the A.E.F. by the Gladiator factory. As documented from the original American and French military archives, most of these Mle 1918 Chauchats in .30-06 were flawed from the beginning due to incomplete chamber reaming and other dimensional defects acquired during the manufacturing process at the Gladiator factory. Very few .30-06 Chauchats reached the front lines of northern France; however, when they did, it was reportedly not uncommon for U.S. units to simply discard their Chauchats in favor of M1903 Springfield rifles and cease to function as an auto-rifle squad altogether. Whereas instruction manuals in both French and English for the 8mm Lebel Chauchat are still commonly found today, instruction manuals for the US 30-06 "American Chauchat" have never been seen in U.S. and French military archives or in private collections.

==== Chauchat in American service ====
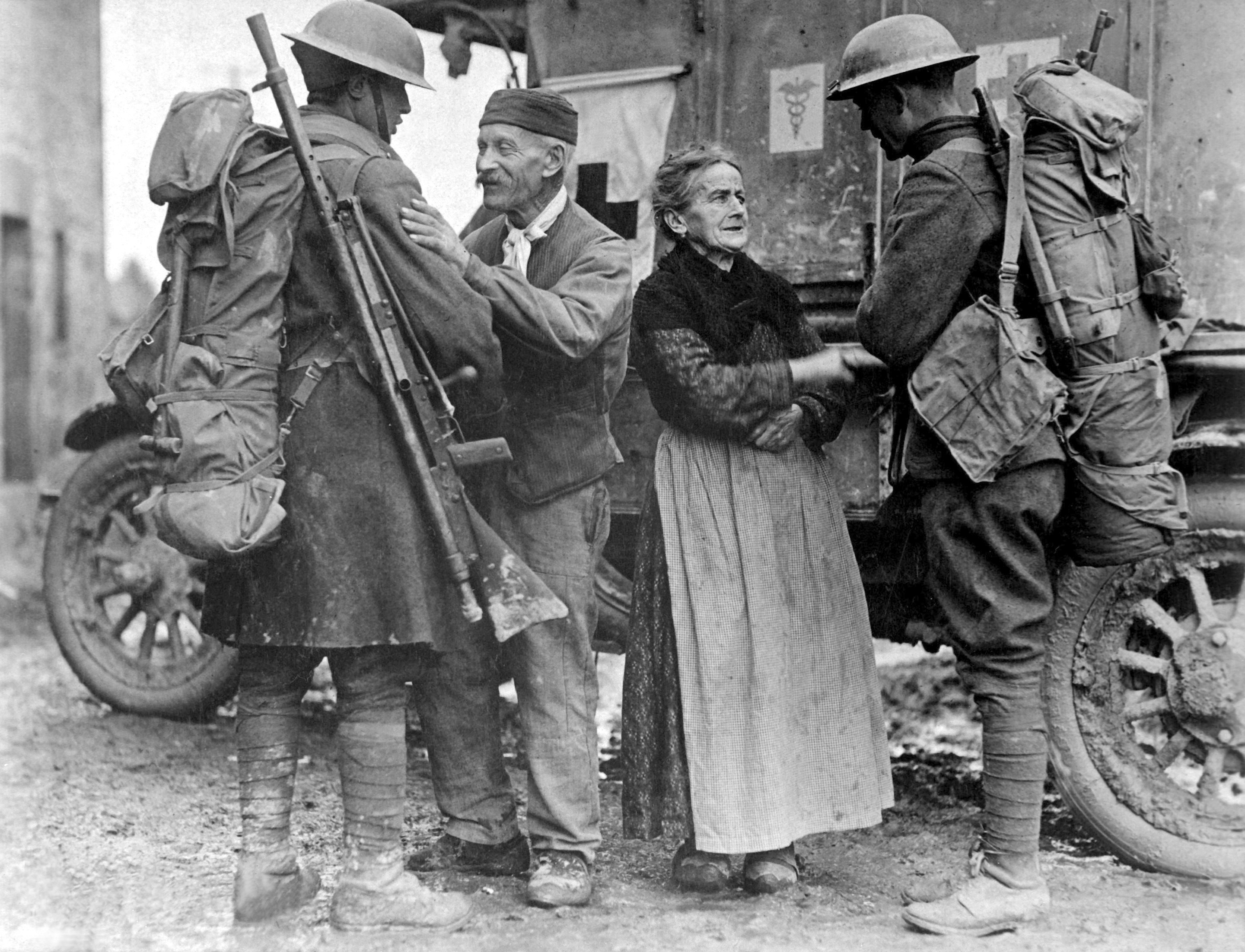
Soldiers of the American 308th and 166th Infantry Regiments liberate a French town in 1918. The soldier on the left is carrying a Chauchat slung over his shoulder.

After the United States entered World War I in April 1917, the American Expeditionary Forces (AEF) arrived in France without automatic weapons or field artillery. Consequently, it turned to its French ally to purchase ordnance. General Pershing chose the Hotchkiss M1914 machine gun and the Chauchat machine rifle (designated as "Automatic Rifle, Model 1915 (Chauchat)" by the AEF and nicknamed the "Sho-Sho" by the troops) to equip U.S. infantry. Between August 1917 and the November 11, 1918 Armistice with Germany, the Gladiator factory delivered to the AEF 16,000 Chauchats in 8 mm Lebel and, late in 1918, 19,000 Chauchats in .30-06.

While the performance of the M1915 Chauchat in 8 mm Lebel was combat-effective, judging by the numbers of decorated U.S. Chauchat gunners found in the U.S. Divisional Histories, the performance of the M1918 Chauchat in .30-06 was soon recognized as abysmal (and in large part the reason for the gun's bad reputation). The most common problem was a failure to extract after the gun had fired only a few rounds and became slightly hot. A modern-day test firing of the M1918 .30-06 Chauchat was performed at Aberdeen Proving Grounds in July 1973, but no particular problem was described in the official report, which is accessible on open file. Conversely, an exhaustive firing test of the M1918 Chauchat in .30-06 was also carried out in 1994 near Chambersburg, Pennsylvania, by R. Keller and W. Garofalo. Their testing, which is reported in "The Chauchat Machine Rifle" volume, did expose severe extraction problems caused by incorrect chamber measurements and other substandard manufacturing. During World War I, in 1918, the preserved U.S. archival record also documents that American inspectors at the Gladiator factory had rejected about 40% of the .30-06 Chauchat production, while the remaining 60% proved problematic when they reached the front lines. Supplies of the newly manufactured and superior M1918 Browning Automatic Rifle (BAR) were allocated sparingly and only very late, during the Meuse-Argonne offensive, which began in late September 1918. Therefore, about 75% of the U.S. Divisions were still equipped with the Chauchat – in its original French M1915 version in 8 mm Lebel – at the time of the Armistice of November 11, 1918. It is also well documented that General Pershing had been holding back on the BAR until victory was certain, for fear it would be copied by Germany. However, it is also known that the very first BARs delivered had improperly tempered recoil springs, and had these guns been prematurely introduced during the summer of 1918, their employment may also have been problematic. One of the most significant accounts of the Chauchat's poor performance was from then-lieutenant Lemuel Shepherd, who was quoted saying:

I spent the last few weeks [of World War I] back in the hospital, but I'll tell you one thing the boys later told me: The day after the Armistice they got the word to turn in their Chauchats and draw Browning Automatic Rifles. That BAR was so much better than that damned Chauchat. If we'd only had the BAR six months before, it would have saved so many lives.

As documented by World War I veteran Laurence Stallings (in The Doughboys, 1963) and by U.S. Divisional Histories, the Medal of Honor was awarded to three American Chauchat gunners in 1918:

1. Private Nels Wold (35th Division, 138th Infantry, KIA, posthumous)
2. Private Frank Bart (2nd Division, 9th Infantry)
3. Private Thomas C. Neibaur (42nd Division, 107th Infantry)

=== Belgian use ===
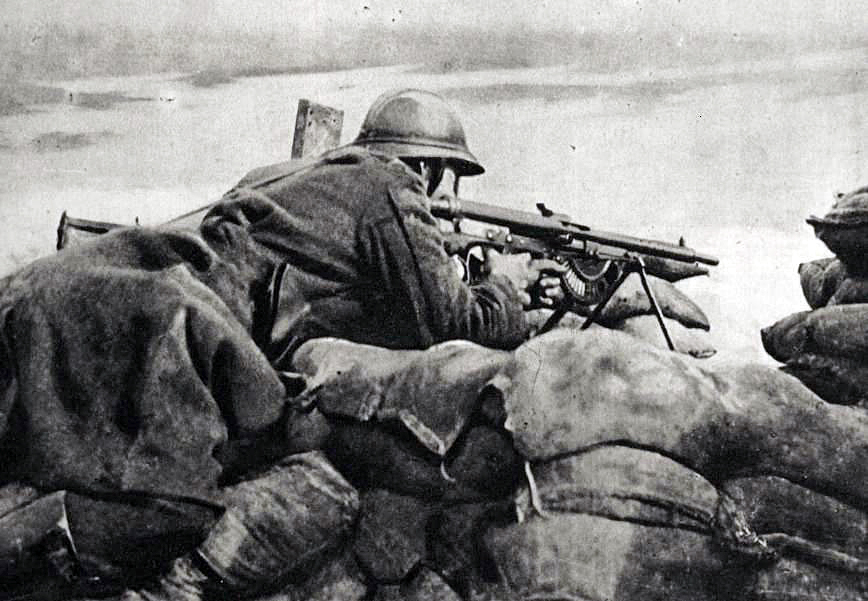
A Belgian machine gunner armed with a Chauchat, guarding a trench

The Belgian Army, which held a large sector of the Western Front but left its arms industry on the territories occupied by the Germans, started to acquire Chauchats for its infantry in the spring of 1916, getting over 1400 in a year, all in 8 mm Lebel. In order to simplify squad-level logistics in the spring of 1917 a version chambered in their standard 7.65×53mm Mauser ammunition was tested, which had a new curved box magazine lacking cutouts for the mud to get inside. During the war, Belgium acquired almost 7000 Chauchats, and reportedly about a half of those were either produced in 7.65 or retrofitted to the modelle 1915-17 standard, with 3250 in active service and an unknown number (taking into account combat losses) in reserve. These numbers, however, are inconsistent with the fact that 4000 of Belgian M1915/17s were sold to Yugoslavia (see below). By 1924, Belgium only had 2902 automatic rifles to declare to the League of Nations, with none in reserve.

The remaining ones were modified to address the numerous deficiencies in the unrefined design, the most visually obvious one was being covers against mud and dust on all the orifices. Less obvious modifications were a better bipod and a latch to tighten upper receiver to the lower. Postwar-upgraded guns were designated Fusil-Mitrailleur 1915-27. They were kept in service into the 1930s including some rear-line troops in 1940.

=== WWI German use ===
A number of captured Chauchats were used by German front-line infantrymen in flamethrower units and assault troops because they had no equivalent light machine guns of their own until their attempt at one such portable weapon - the Maxim MG 08-15 lightened machine guns - that were issued to them during early 1917. The German army tried to modify some of these guns to fire the 7.92×57mm Mauser cartridge.

=== Serbian use ===
The Royal Serbian Army received at least 1,400 Chauchats, locally known as puškomitraljez M. 1915, between December 1916 and April 1917. In mid-1920s Yugoslavia bought 4,000 M1915/17s more from Belgium as a stopgap measure, and in 1926-1928 rechambered them from 7,65-mm Belgian to captured 7.9×57mm M1888 ammo, designating the result as puškomitraljez 7,9 mm. M. 15/26.

=== Greek use ===
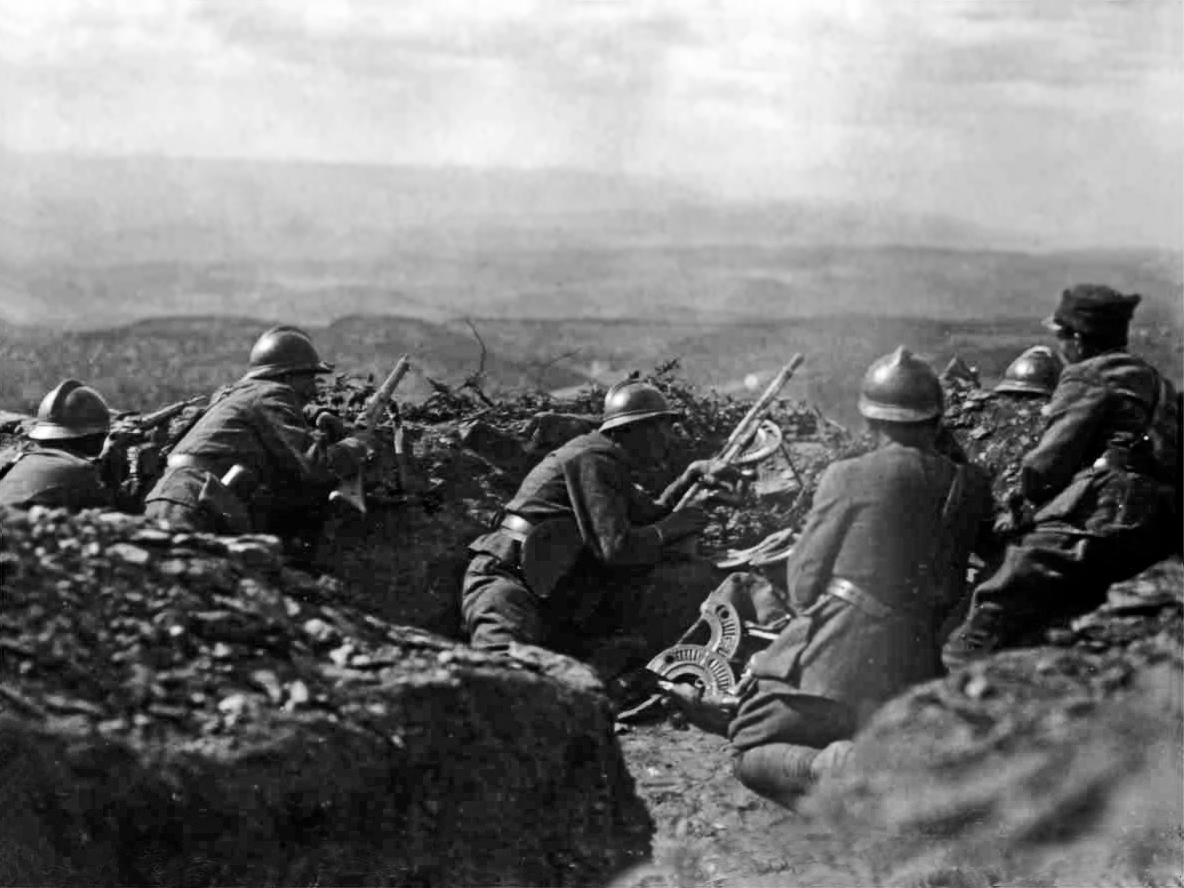
Greek soldiers with a Chauchat LMG (center) during the Battle of Dumlupınar, 1922.

Chauchat entered service with Hellenic Army in 1917. Turkish National Movement forces used captured guns during the Greco-Turkish War. The Chauchat was still in frontline use during the Greco-Italian War.

=== Polish use ===
Poland received French military assistance, notably infantry weapons and artillery, after World War I. As a part of those French weaponry transfers, Poland received over 2,000 Chauchats, which they used extensively during the Polish–Soviet War (1919–1921). After that war, Poland bought more of them, and their numbers reached 11,869, becoming a standard Polish light machine gun (the RKM wz 15). Eventually, about half of them were successfully converted during the mid-1920s to 8mm Mauser and kept in service until the early 1930s under the designation RKM wz. 15/27. One remaining specimen of these Polish Chauchats in 8mm Mauser is preserved and visible in the MoD (Ministry of Defence) National Firearms Centre which is a part of the Royal Armouries in Leeds, Great Britain. Later, in 1936–1937, some 2,650 Chauchats were sold abroad by Poland, some to the Mexican Army, others to Republican Spain and also on the international surplus weapon market.

=== Finnish use ===
During the Winter War between Soviet Union and Finland, over 5,000 surplus Chauchats were donated by France to Finland, which was short on automatic weapons. The weapons arrived too late to see action but were used in Continuation War, mostly on the home front or field artillery units, but also some unlucky infantry units were shortly equipped with these guns during early part of the Continuation War. After the war they were warehoused until 1955 and sold to Interarmco in 1959–1960.

=== WWII use ===
Chinese-made copies of the Chauchat were captured by Japanese forces during the Second Sino-Japanese War. French third-line units that faced the German breakthrough during the Fall of France in May and June 1940 were still equipped with Chauchat machine guns.

Nazi Germany seized Chauchats from Poland, Belgium, France, Greece and Yugoslavia. Ex-French guns were designated l.MG 156(f), ex-Yugoslav l.MG 147(j), ex-Greek l.MG 156(g) and ex-Belgian l.MG 126(b). 50,000 Chauchats captured by the Germans alongside Berthier rifles were given to the Hungarians in 1942 inexchange for food, who then used them for police and militia

=== Post World War II ===
The Chauchat saw service by Syria in the 1948 Arab-Israel war.

The Vietminh used Chauchat LMG during the First Indochia War.

== Variants ==
- Chauchat M^{le} 1915 — Standard service variant, chambered in 8mm Lebel.
- Chauchat M^{le} 1918 — Modified variant made for US, with a 16-round curved box magazine chambered in .30-06 Springfield.
- Fusil-Mitrailleur M^{le} 15-17 — Modified variant made by Belgium, chambered in 7.65×53mm Mauser using a 20-round curved box magazine.
  - Fusil-Mitrailleur M^{le} 15-27 — Improved Chauchat M^{le} 15/17 with the best magazines made for any model of the Chauchat, as well as a series of dust covers to close off every hole in the gun (magazine well, ejection port, charging handle slot, and barrel shroud vents). The original bipod replaced with a much better type (similar to what they would use on the FN BAR), a simplified feed system, and a tension latch added to ensure reliable operation.
  - Puškomitraljez 7,9 mm. M. 15/26 — Belgian-made Chauchat M^{le} 15/17 modified by Yugoslavia to be chambered in 7.9×57mm M1888 ammunition.

== Designations ==
Belgian

- Fusil-Mitrailleur M^{le} 15 — French-made Chauchat M^{le} 1915 in Belgian service.
- Fusil-Mitrailleur M^{le} 15-17 — Modified Chauchat M^{le} 1915
- Fusil-Mitrailleur M^{le} 15-27 — Improved Chauchat M^{le} 1915-27

France

- Fusil Mitrailleur Modèle 1915 CSRG — Standard French service variant.
- Fusil Mitrailleur Modèle 1918 CSRG — Variant for US service.

United States

- Automatic Rifle, Model 1915 (Chauchat) — French-made Chauchat M^{le} 1915 in US service.
- Automatic Rifle, Model 1918 (Chauchat) — French-made Chauchat M^{le} 1918 in US service.

Yugoslavia

- Puškomitraljez M. 1915 — French-made Chauchat M^{le} 1915 in Yugoslavian service.
- Puškomitraljez 7,9 mm. M. 15/26 — Modified Belgian-made Chauchat M^{le} 15/17.

== Users ==
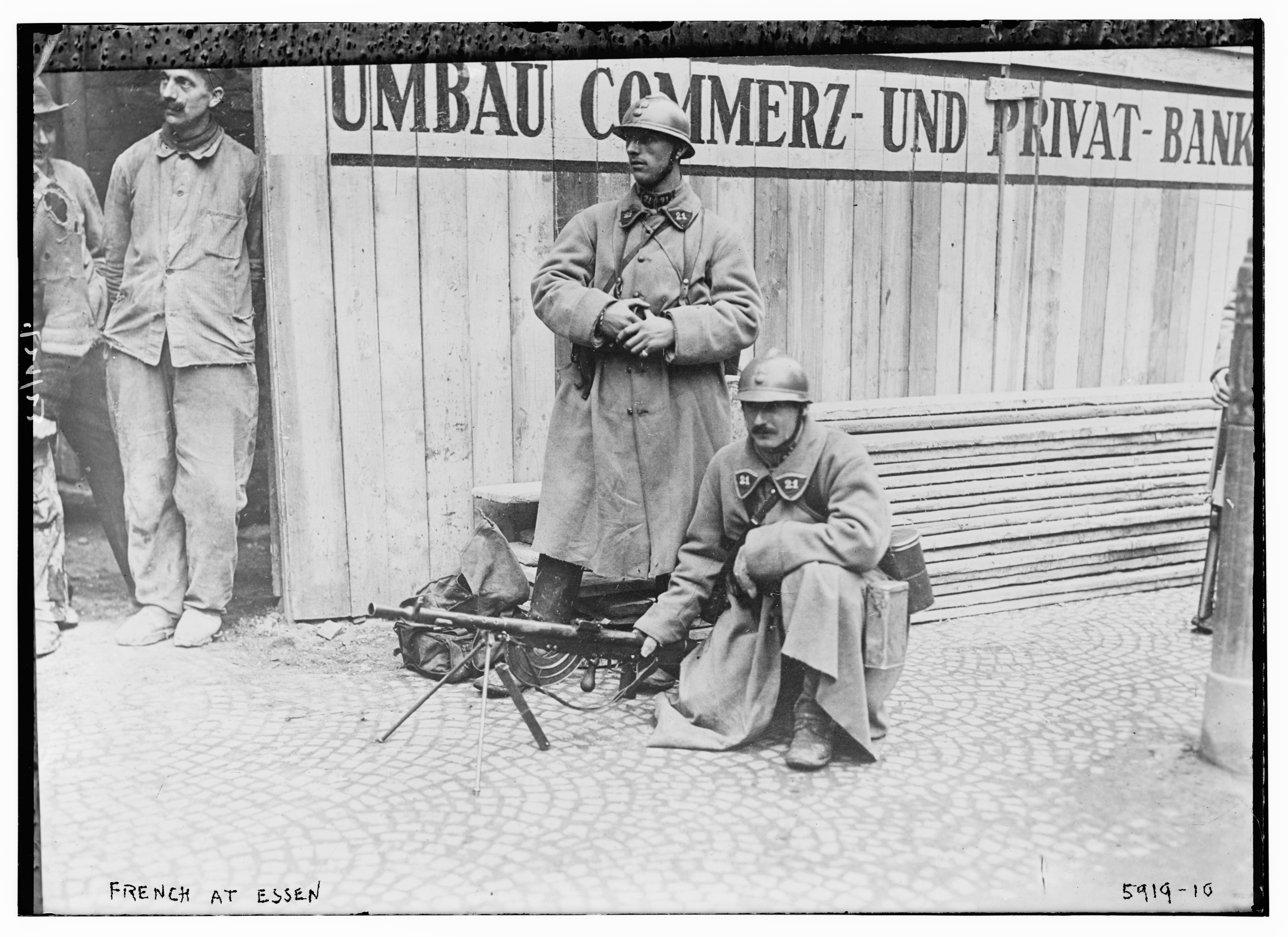
French cavalrymen with a Chauchat machine gun during the occupation of the Ruhr, 1923.

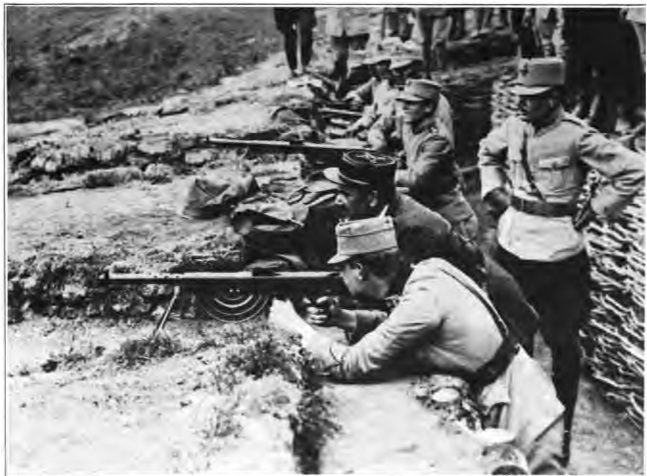
Crown Prince Carol of Romania firing a Chauchat

- Belgium – 6,935 (about half of them converted to 7.65×53mm Mauser).
- Bulgaria – Captured examples used by Bulgarian Police.
- China – About 100 copies of the Chauchat were produced by Jinglin Arsenal and used during the Second Sino-Japanese War.
- Czechoslovakia – The Czechoslovak Legion brought back 130 Chauchat guns from Russia in 1920.
- Finland
- France – Over 100,000 placed in front-line service at the infantry squad level between April 1916 and November 1918.
- German Empire – Captured. Some rechambered to fire 7.92×57mm Mauser.
- Nazi Germany
- Greece – Delivered by France from 1917 and 3,950 received from Poland.
- Hungary50,000 given by germany alongside Berthier rifles in exchange for food
- Italy – 1,729
- Latvia – 546 used by the Latvian Army (by April 1936).
- Mexico
- Poland – A total of 11,869 were acquired, designated RKM wz 15. Some converted to 8mm Mauser.
- Romania – 4,495
- Russian Empire – 6,100
- Soviet Russia – Several Red Army units used Chauchats during Russian Civil War.
- Serbia – At least 1,400 guns.
- Spain
  - Spanish Republic – Received from Poland.
  - Spanish State – Captured from Republicans or intercepted during transport.
- Syria – Used during the 1948 Arab–Israeli War.
- Turkey – Turkish National Movement used captured examples, later used by the Turkish Army.
- United States (1917–1918) – 15,918 in 8mm Lebel plus 19,241 in US 30-06. The latter model (in US .30-06), being unsatisfactory, was never deployed in significant numbers.
- Yugoslavia

== See also ==
- Chauchat-Ribeyrolles 1918 submachine gun
- Hotchkiss M1909 light machine gun
- List of individual weapons of the U.S. Armed Forces
- List of infantry weapons of World War I
