= Marching fire =

Tactic of firing weapons while advancing

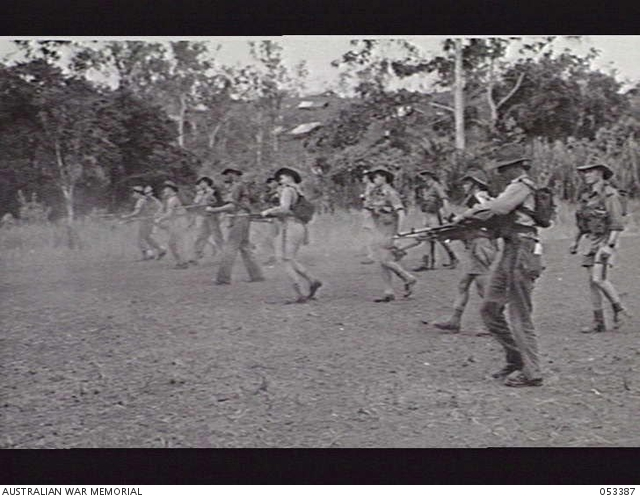
Australian troops train in the use of the Bren light machine gun, 1943

Marching fire, also known as walking fire, is a military tactic—a form of suppressive fire used during an infantry assault or combined arms assault. Advancing units fire their weapons without stopping to aim, in an attempt to pin down enemy defenders. Marching fire usually ends with an infantry charge to engage the enemy in close combat. The tactic requires ample ammunition and rapid-fire weapons. It differs from fire and movement in that the attacking force advances in unison rather than leapfrogging forward in alternating groups.

An early form of marching fire was used with little success by Prussian troops at the end of the 18th century, then victoriously in the 1866 Battle of Königgrätz because of the fast-firing Dreyse needle gun. The modern form of marching fire evolved in the early 20th century from a French Army infantry assault concept which suggested the use of suppressive fire from a light machine gun carried by one man—the Chauchat automatic rifle. The tactic was employed to a limited degree in World War I then further codified with the introduction of the M1918 Browning Automatic Rifle and described in U.S. small unit infantry tactics manuals in the early 1920s. As a combined arms stratagem, the tactic was prominently advocated and utilized by General George S. Patton in World War II during his command of the Third Army.

Infantry alone may be insufficient to suppress a well-positioned, well-armed and resolute enemy, especially during the final charge phase. To augment marching fire, supporting forces including heavy weapons teams and armored units may be halted in static positions to maintain suppressive fire throughout the final charge of friendly troops.

== History ==
The French military tactician Jacques Antoine Hippolyte, Comte de Guibert, wrote dismissively about a Prussian tactic he called "marching fire". In the late 18th century he witnessed a Prussian Army maneuver in which advancing troops formed themselves into a battle line of two ranks. In alternating fashion, one rank fired their weapons at a slow march while the other group reloaded then advanced on the double. The Prussians called this tactic "fire in advancing" (Feuer im Vormarsch) and trained in it at the level of platoon, company and battalion. Guibert considered it "ill advised", with the line's progress across the field seen as too slow, exposing the troops for too long to defensive fire.

Dreyse needle gun

The first successful employment of marching fire may be traced to the fast-firing Dreyse needle gun used by Prussian troops in the mid-19th century. This new breech-loading gun was 2–3 times faster than contemporary muzzle-loading guns, and its lightweight cartridge allowed the infantryman to carry more ammunition. A major disadvantage was that escaping hot gases from the breech would strike the face of any trooper who took careful aim. Accordingly, the weapon was often fired while being held away from the face with the result that marksmanship was inferior. In 1866, Prussians were successful in advancing quickly while firing their needle guns in the Battle of Königgrätz; the decisive battle of the Austro-Prussian War. Soon, though, the increased use of rapid-fire guns by defending troops neutralized the advantage.

== 20th century ==
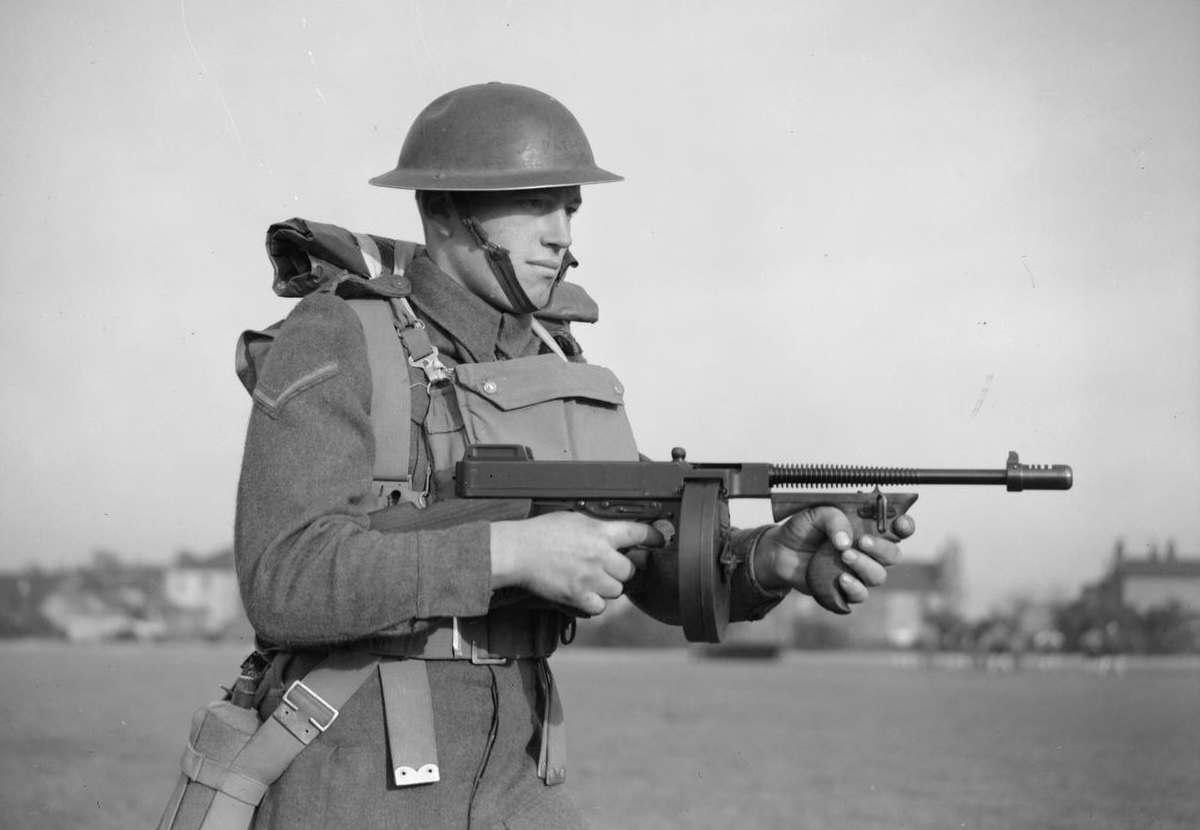
A British soldier demonstrates proper marching fire technique using a Thompson submachine gun with a 50-round drum magazine

In 1903, French military theorists noticed that the machine guns of the day, heavy and relatively immobile, were of little use in infantry assaults. They determined that "the machine gun must learn to walk". A marching fire tactic (French: feu de marche) was expected to involve incidental suppressive fire, with the advancing troops considered a deadlier threat than the unaimed bullets, causing the enemy to fall back. The prototype guns were not approved for production, and none were in service when World War I began. At the start of hostilities, France quickly turned an existing prototype ( the "CS" for Chauchat and Sutter ) into the lightweight Chauchat M1915 automatic rifle with a high rate of fire. The French Army was equipped with it, and the first American units to arrive in France used it in 1917 and 1918. Hastily mass manufactured under desperate wartime pressures, the weapon was prone to jamming and overheating. Seeing the potential of such a gun, the British Army settled upon the American-designed Lewis gun fitted for a .303-inch (7.7 mm) round; infantry platoons provided with the guns were instructed in fire and movement tactics. Soon, the gun was seen to be useful in marching fire assaults, notably by the Australian Corps in the July 1918 Battle of Hamel. To serve the same purpose, the German Army adopted the MG08/15 which was impractically heavy at 48.5 pounds (22 kg) counting the water for cooling and one magazine holding 100 rounds.

In 1918 the M1918 Browning Automatic Rifle (BAR) was introduced in the US Army, and with the 15.5-pound (7 kg) weapon came new field tactics including marching fire. The BAR's shoulder sling was to be adjusted in length to allow the butt of the weapon to be held firmly at the side of the torso just above the hips, with one hand at the trigger and the other hand aiming. A recommended rate of fire was one round per footstep, with eyes kept on the target and the weapon aimed low at first, intending that ricocheting rounds would lower enemy morale. The tactic was to be employed under conditions of limited field of fire and poor visibility such as advancing through woods. That same year the U.S. Navy instructed its landing forces (usually Marines) that marching fire with a BAR was to be used in very limited circumstances, such as when the enemy line was clearly defined and the range was less than 200 yards (180 m). Marching fire was not usually employed in the open and was more appropriate in dense woods. The Reserve Officers' Training Corps (ROTC) handbook of 1921 included a description of marching fire as an assault tactic in which the BAR men walk and shoot from the hip with the weapon's weight supported on a shoulder sling, but the accompanying riflemen were expected to halt and carefully aim each of their shots, firing from the shoulder, from a standing or kneeling position.

The psychological value of marching fire was quickly recognized. Marching fire was seen as a boost to the morale of the assault troops. It was hoped that enemy troops would lose courage if they heard bullets flying around them, if they believed that their position was known to the attackers.

=== World War II ===
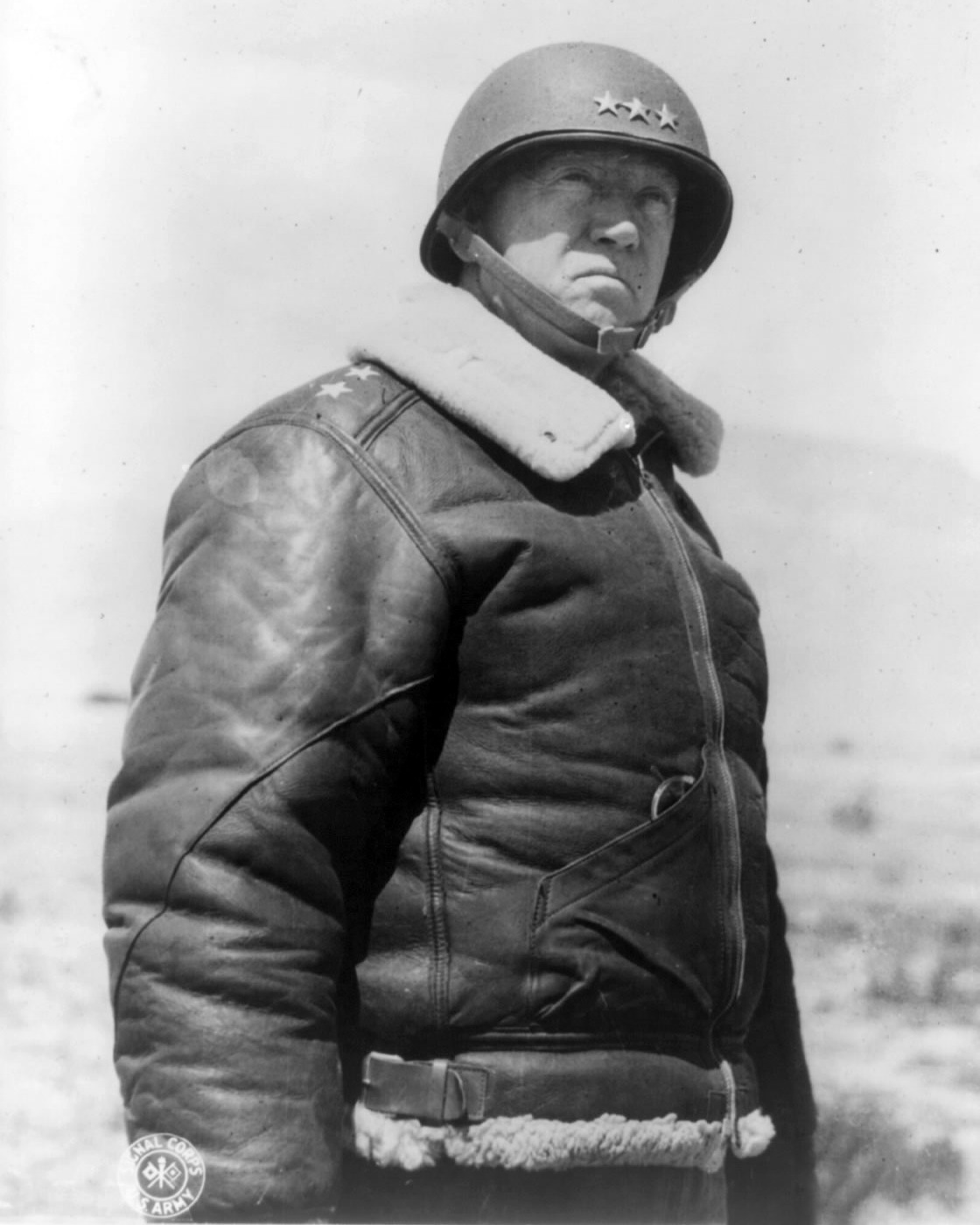
General George S. Patton in 1943

The tactic of marching fire was praised by General George S. Patton for three reasons: friendly forces using the tactic continued to advance rather than get bogged down, the positive action of shooting provided self-confidence to the soldier, and the enemy's defensive fire was reduced in accuracy, volume and effectiveness. Patton recommended that the rifleman carrying "that magnificent weapon", the M1 Garand rifle, should fire his weapon every two or three paces, holding the weapon at his shoulder if desired, but a lower position between the belt and armpit was "just as effective". Patton advised his 81 mm M1 mortar teams to stay in one place during the assault and apply steady fire, but his smaller 60 mm M2 mortars should alternately fire and leapfrog forward. Light machine guns could be simultaneously carried and fired by one man while another man fed the ammo belt. Patton wrote that the main purpose of the tank was to attack infantry in defensive positions rather than other tanks. He instructed his tanks and other armored units to advance with marching fire in support of the infantry.

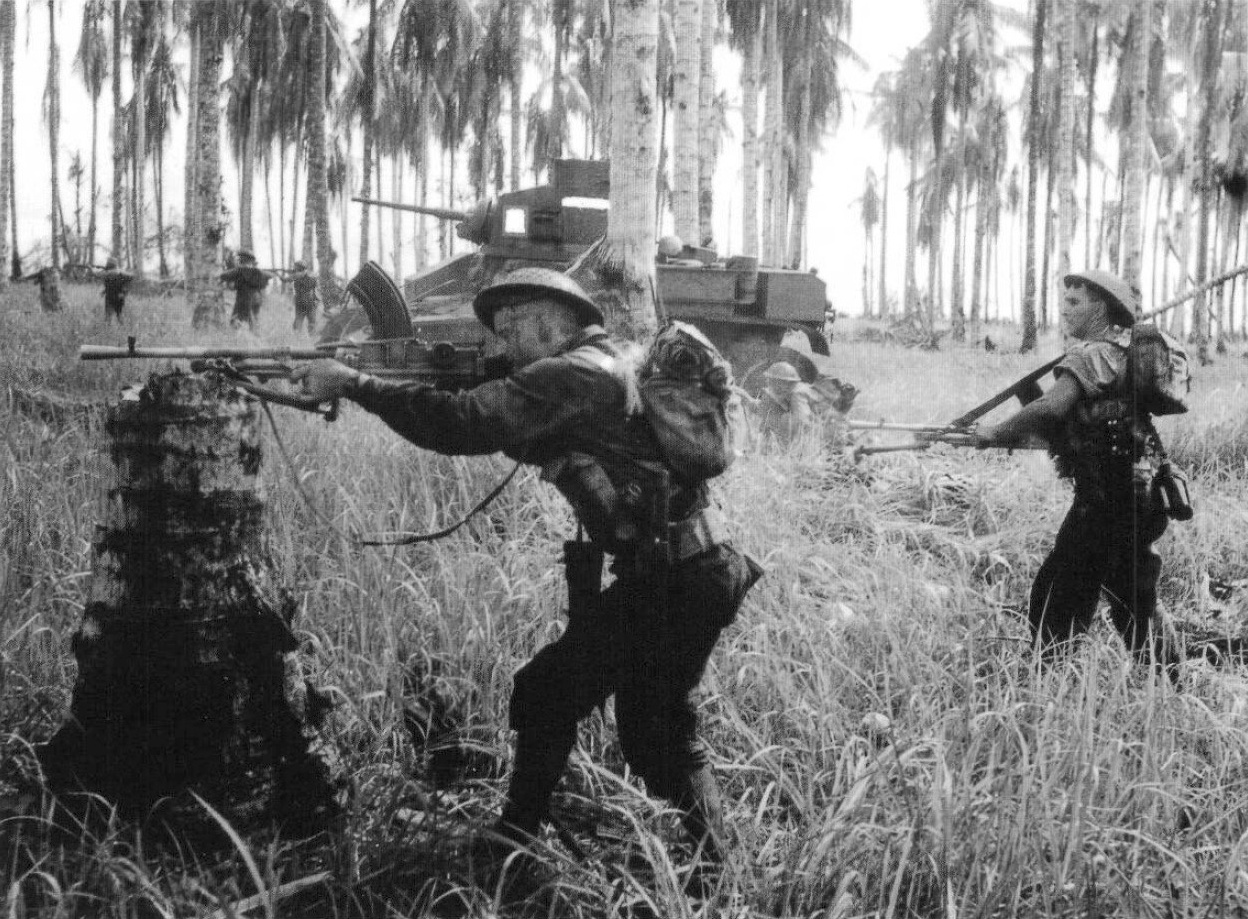
Australian troops advance against a Japanese pillbox at Giropa Point during the battle of Buna–Gona in 1943, supported by an M3 Stuart tank

General William E. DePuy, who rose from junior staff officer to battalion commander in the 90th Infantry Division between 1942 and 1945, evaluated the efficacy of unsupported marching fire and found it lacking. Writing after the war, DePuy said that marching fire became a fad, in some American units almost the sole form of attack. DePuy noted that when it was employed against Germans who were "well hidden and in very good positions"—as they usually were—the attackers walked into the enemy's kill zone. DePuy said that if maneuvering infantry alone performed marching fire, the moment when enemy suppression was most needed it would cease during the final charge at which time "the enemy then comes up out of his foxholes and starts to fire at you." DePuy asserted that suppression gained by fire from non-moving units was critical to the success of marching fire. Such units could be as large as rifle companies or as small as squads equipped with heavy and light machine guns.
