= Roth–Steyr M1907 =

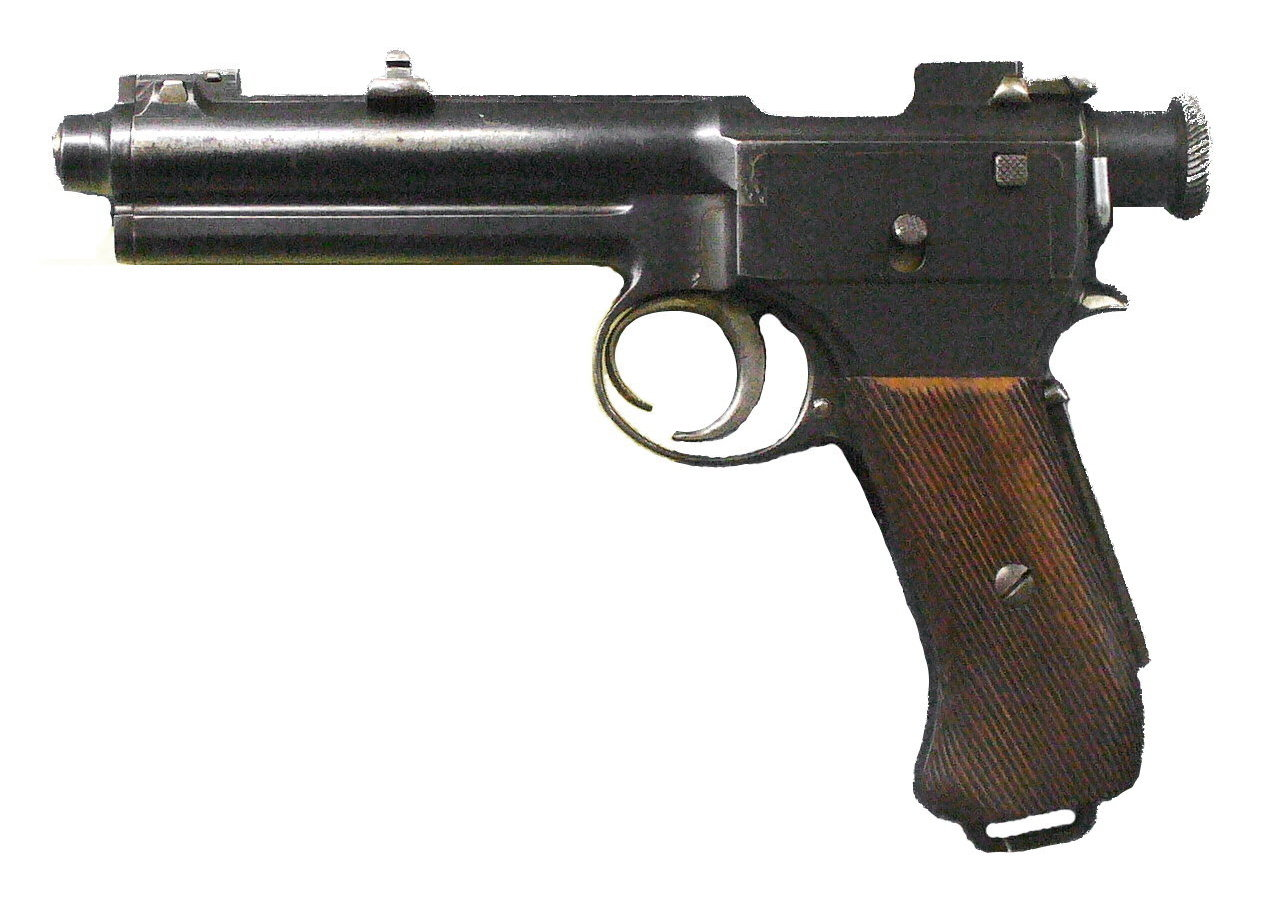
- Type: Semi-automatic pistol
- Place of origin: Austria-Hungary

Service history
- In service: 1909–1945
- Used by: Austria-Hungary; Austria; Kingdom of Hungary; Kingdom of Italy; Poland; Kingdom of Yugoslavia; Czechoslovakia
- Wars: World War I Polish–Soviet War; World War II

Production history
- Designer: Karel Krnka
- Designed: 1907
- Manufacturer: Œ.W.G. Fegyver- és Gépgyár
- Produced: 1908–1914
- No. built: 99,000

Specifications
- Mass: 1,030 g (36 oz)
- Length: 23 cm (9.1 in)
- Barrel length: 13 cm (5.1 in)
- Cartridge: 8mm Roth–Steyr
- Action: Recoil-operated
- Muzzle velocity: 330 m/s (1,100 ft/s)
- Effective firing range: 50 m (160 ft)
- Maximum firing range: 100 m (330 ft)
- Feed system: 10-round integral box magazine, fed by stripper clip
- Sights: Iron sights

The Roth–Steyr M1907, also known as the Roth-Krnka M.7 or Roth-Steyr Model, is an Austro-Hungarian semi-automatic pistol designed by Karel Krnka and manufactured by Österreichische Waffenfabriks-Gesellschaft (Œ.W.G.) and Fegyver- és Gépgyár. It was adopted in 1907 and issued to the cavalry of the Austro-Hungarian Army, entering service in 1909.

The Roth–Steyr M1907 was a significant early military semi-automatic pistol and saw service during World War I. It was among the early self-loading pistols adopted for military service by a major European power, following earlier military adoption of semi-automatic pistols in Switzerland, Germany, and Italy.

== Mechanism ==
The Roth–Steyr pistol fires from an unusual style of locked breech. The bolt is very long. Its rear end is solid, except for a sleeve for the striker, but its front part is hollow and fits tightly over the barrel. The interior of the bolt has cam grooves cut into it, and the barrel has studs which fit into the grooves. When the pistol is fired, the barrel and bolt recoil together within the hollow receiver for about 0.5 in (13 mm). During this operation, the helical grooves in the muzzle bush cause the barrel to turn 90 degrees clockwise, after which it is held while the unlocked bolt continues to the rear, cocking the action as it does so. For safety in the intended use by mounted cavalry, the pistol has a heavy trigger pull against the firing striker spring, similar to a hammerless revolver.

The Roth–Steyr is a locked-breech pistol, which allows the barrel and bolt to recoil together within a hollow receiver. It is chambered for a cartridge specific to this model. The Roth–Steyr does not have a detachable magazine, but features a fixed magazine loaded from the top with stripper clips. The sights are fixed, the grips are wooden and terminate in a lanyard ring. Rifling is four grooves with right-hand twist.

The Bundeswehr Museum of German Defense Technology in Koblenz has one of these specimen in its collection.

== Production and distribution ==
The pistol was developed by the Czech designer Karel Krnka, working for the ammunition company of Georg Roth, based on the earlier Roth–Theodorovic pistol. After development and tests of several prototypes, the final version of the Roth–Krnka won a contest for an Army pistol in 1906, and was adapted as a standard gun of Austro-Hungarian Army as: Repetierpistole M.7. (self-loading pistol M1907). Since Roth had no weapon production capabilities, the government bought all the rights and ordered production in the Österreichische Waffenfabriksgesellschaft (OEWG) in Steyr and FEG in Budapest. From 1908 to 1914, approximately 99,000 weapons were manufactured (the Army received 59,334 from Steyr and 38,213 from FEG, plus several hundred were sold on the civilian market). Despite common name for the pistol Roth–Steyr, Steyr works did not participate in its design, apart from minor improvements. Following the dissolution of Austria-Hungary, the Roth–Steyr was fielded by Yugoslavia, with limited use during World War II by the Austrians and Hungarians. Italy received a number of pistols as World War I reparations from Austria-Hungary, and these pistols were used by Italian troops during World War II. They were used also in Czechoslovakia and Poland.

== Time Table ==
Manufacturer
Introduced
Variants
Cartridge (mm)
Cartridge (in)*
Notes
Roth
Early 1890s
1895, 1897, 1898
8x19 Roth
0.329
Invented by Roth from Wasa Theodorovic patent, Civilian Market
Roth
Late 1890s
1895, 1897, 1899
(1895, 8x21)

8x19?

(1895, 0.32)

0.329?

Karel Krnka changed the bolt, Civilian Market
Sauer

FÉG

Around 1901
1905
7.65 x 13
0.301
Civilian Market, Police
Roth
1902
1899/02
11.5 Roth krnka
0.45
Prototype, UK Trial, Failed
Roth
1903
1903
?
0.44
Prototype, UK Trial, Failed
Roth
1904
1904(M.I, M.II, M.III)
8x19 Roth(M.III 7.65)
0.329
Prototype, Austro Hungarian trials
Roth

FÉG

1906
1906(M. II)
8x19 Roth
0.329
Hammerless, Prototype, Austro Hungarian trials
O.E.W.G

FÉG

1907
1907
8x19 Roth
0.329
Adopted by Austro Hungarian military, Civilian market
O.E.W.G
1909
1909
11 ?
0.403 ?
Prototype, UK Trial, not adopted
O.E.W.G
1911
1911
10.3x18.8
0.38
US Trial, Failed

*not to be confused with ACP

== The United Kingdom & United States Trials ==
The company was looking forward to get a military contract for their brand new gun. The pistol was originally chambered for 8x18 mm Roth Steyr however the United Kingdom and United States asked for a gun that would use a bigger cartridge, most preferably a 0.45 in (11 mm) Cal.

=== United Kingdom ===
The trials are exhaustively described in the Minutes of the Small Arms Committee, starting in April 1900 with the Borchardt and ending with the adoption of the .455SL Webley in 1912.

The first trial of the 11.35 mm (0.447 in) Roth is recorded in Minute 635 of June 1902. An 8mm Roth had been tested earlier in October 1900. In 1902, Roth submitted two 11.35 mm (0.447 in) and one 8mm pistol of “improved design”. The committee reported that the ammunition had a bullet of 198 gr (12.8 g) with a copper envelope with exposed lead tip with 5 gr (0.32 g) of smokeless powder.

In March 1903, another Roth pistol was tested (Minute 745), this time in “.0.44 in (11 mm) caliber” with a bullet of 247 gr (16.0 g) which gave a velocity of 975 ft/s (297 m/s). The conclusion was that the method of loading was unsatisfactory, pull-off too heavy, too many openings to admit dust but Figure of Merit was good.

The last mention of a Roth is Minute 1077 of May 1909 when an 11 mm (0.43 in) (0.403 in (10.2 mm) actual) pistol, described as a “Mark II”, was tested. Recorded as having an eight round magazine loaded by charger. The velocity was 816.8 ft/s (249.0 m/s) and penetrated ten of the 0.5 in (13 mm) boards, spaced 1 in (25 mm) apart at 25 ft (7.6 m). Bullets weighed 200 gr (13 g) grains with steel envelope and 4.7 gr (0.30 g) of smokeless powder.

Conclusions were that it was a handy and well balanced pistol with good certainty of action. It performed well in the sand test, strips easily, and had less recoil that the Webley pistol. There was no safety catch, which was a disadvantage.

=== United States ===
A prototype in 10.3 mm (0.41 in) cartridge was tested at the Springfield Armory and it failed the 1,250 rounds endurance test with 191 malfunctions of 9 different types of ammunition and a broken extractor.

== See also ==
- Frommer Stop
- 8mm Roth–Steyr
- 8 mm caliber
- List of handgun cartridges
- Roth-Theodorovic pistol
- Roth-Sauer pistol
