= Velký Bor =

- Municipality
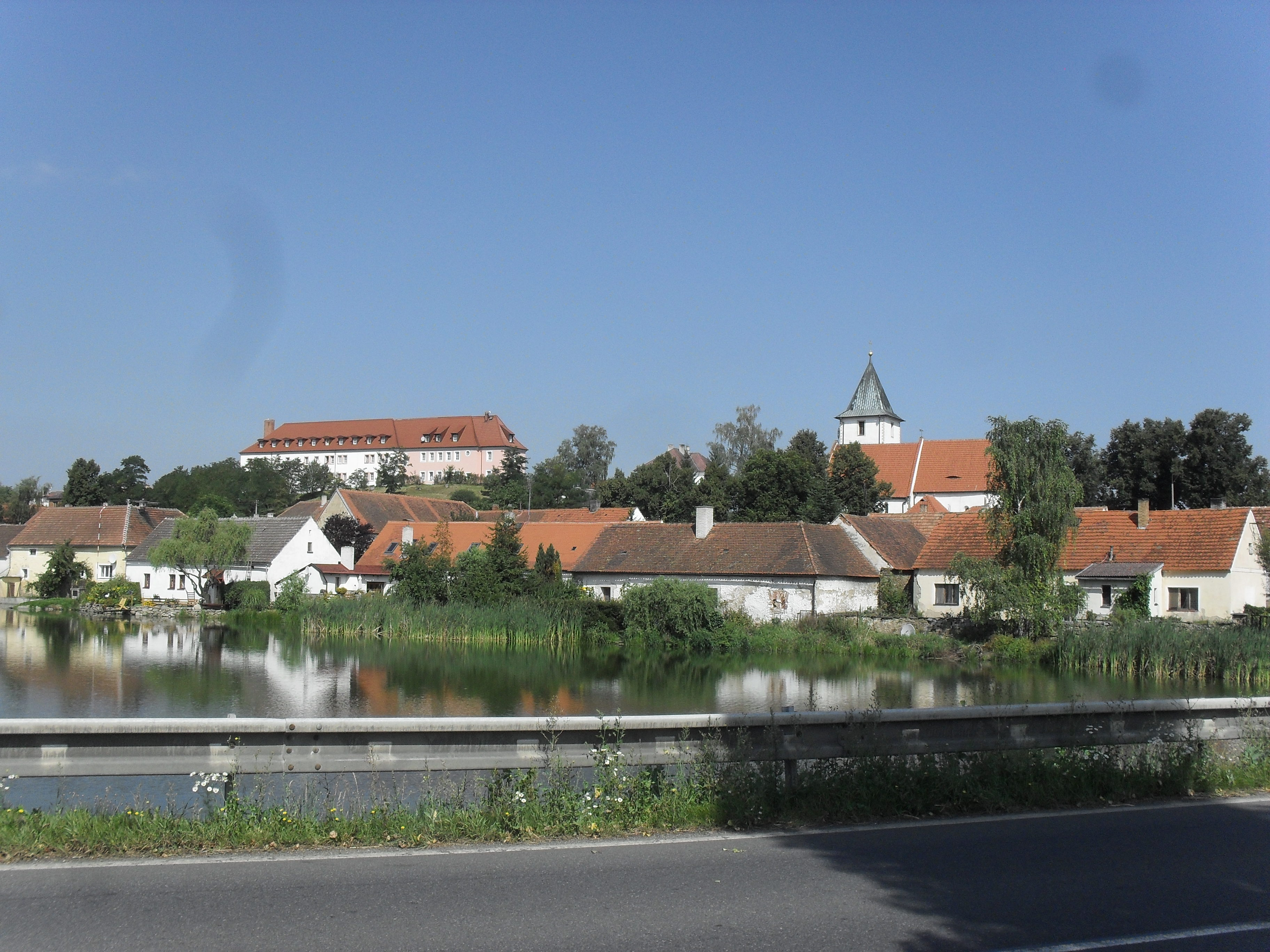
- General view

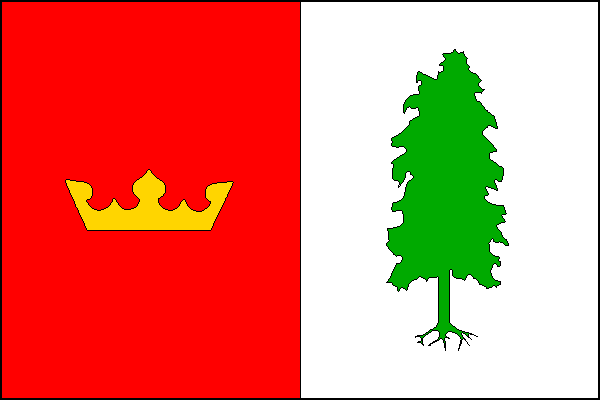
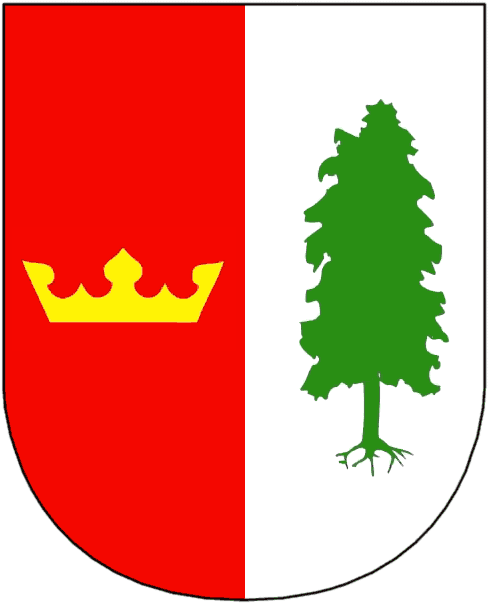
- Flag Coat of arms

- Location in the Czech Republic
- Coordinates: 49°21′54″N 13°42′5″E
- Country: Czech Republic
- Region: Plzeň
- District: Klatovy
- First mentioned: 1283

Area
  - Total: 17.85 km^{2} (6.89 sq mi)
- Elevation: 452 m (1,483 ft)

Population (2026-01-01)
  - Total: 566
  - Density: 31.7/km^{2} (82.1/sq mi)
- Time zone: UTC+1 (CET)
  - Summer (DST): UTC+2 (CEST)
- Postal code: 341 01
- Website: www.sumavanet.cz/velkybor/

Velký Bor is a municipality and village in Klatovy District in the Plzeň Region of the Czech Republic. It has about 600 inhabitants.

== Administrative division ==
Velký Bor consists of three municipal parts (in brackets population according to the 2021 census):

- Velký Bor (340)
- Jetenovice (110)
- Slivonice (84)

Slivonice forms an exclave of the municipal territory.

== Etymology ==
The initial name of Velký Bor was just Bor, meaning 'pine forest'. The settlement was founded near a pine forest or on the site where pine forest was cut down. Since the 14th century, the village has been called Velký Bor ('great Bor') to distinguish it from nearby Malý Bor ('little Bor').

== Geography ==
Velký Bor is located about 29 kilometres (18 mi) east of Klatovy and 47 km (29 mi) southeast of Plzeň. It lies in the Blatná Uplands. The highest point is the hill Baba at 558 m (1,831 ft) above sea level. The stream Velkoborský potok flows through the village of Velký Bor. The area is rich in small streams and fishponds.

== History ==
The first written mention of Velký Bor is from 1283. It was founded in the 13th century together with a castle, which was destroyed in 1420 (during the Hussite Wars). Until 1336, Velký Bor was owned by the Lords of Potštejn. In 1336, it was acquired by the Zderaz Monastery. In 1420, the village became a property of the Riesenberk family and was annexed to the Rabí estate. From 1519 until the establishment of an independent municipality in 1848, it was part of the Horažďovice estate.

== Demographics ==
Historical population

Year	Pop.	±%
1869	1,091	—
1880	1,222	+12.0%
1890	1,119	−8.4%
1900	1,040	−7.1%
1910	1,001	−3.7%

Year	Pop.	±%
1921	963	−3.8%
1930	918	−4.7%
1950	709	−22.8%
1961	705	−0.6%
1970	629	−10.8%

Year	Pop.	±%
1980	560	−11.0%
1991	551	−1.6%
2001	545	−1.1%
2011	556	+2.0%
2021	534	−4.0%

Source: Censuses

== Transport ==
Velký Bor is located on the railway line Plzeň–Horažďovice. The municipality is served with two train stations: Velký Bor and Jetenovice.

== Sights ==
Church of Saint John the Baptist

The main landmark of Velký Bor is the Church of Saint John the Baptist. It was built in the early Gothic style in the second half of the 13th century. In the 1340s, it was rebuilt in the Gothic style. Baroque modifications were made around 1690. The church is equipped with a rare bell from the end of the 15th century.

== Notable people ==
- Sylvester Krnka (1825–1903), rifle maker and inventor
