= Sylvester Krnka =

Czech gunsmith and inventor (1825–1903)

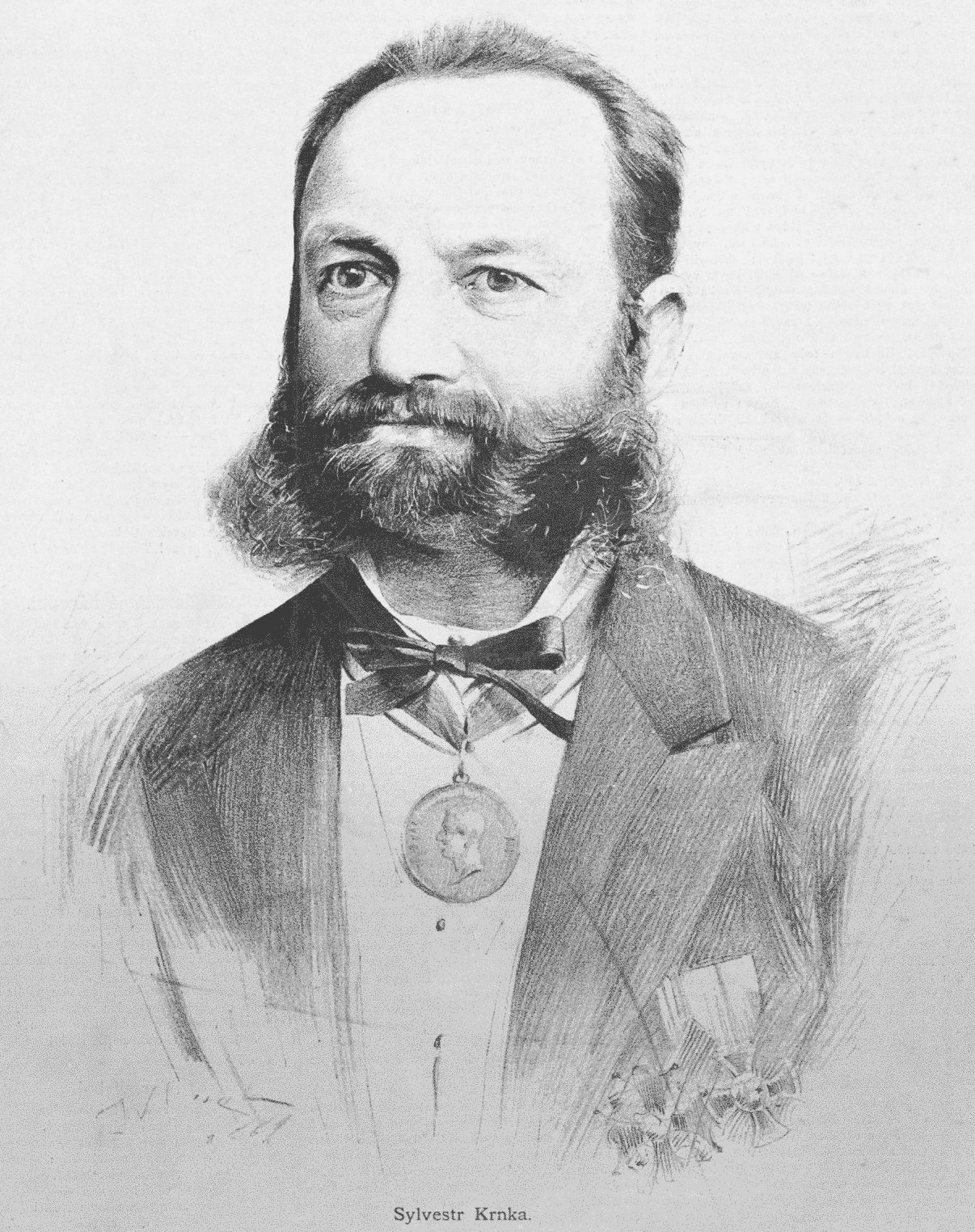
Sylvester Krnka

Sylvester Krnka (in Czech: Sylvestr Krnka; 29 December 1825, Velký Bor – 4 January 1903, Michle) was a Austro-Hungarian gunsmith and inventor, best known for developing the breech-loading conversion rifle adopted by the Russian army in the 19th century.

== Life and career ==
Born in Velký Bor, Bohemia, Krnka began his apprenticeship at age 13 under the Viennese gunsmith master Novotny. He established his workshop in Volyně around 1848 and later moved to Michle (now part of Prague), where he founded a factory. His son Karel Krnka also became a notable firearms designer.

== Invention and adoption ==
In 1867, Krnka developed a hinged-block breech-loading conversion for the Austrian M1857 muzzle-loading musket, chambered for the 15.24×40 mmR cartridge. The system was officially adopted by the Russian Empire in 1869 as Obr.1867 Krnka, with conversions carried out in Tula, Sestroretsk, Kiev, and Izhevsk.

== Service and users ==
The rifle saw widespread use during the Russo-Turkish War (1877–78) and remained in service in limited roles into the late 19th century. Krnka rifles were also supplied to Montenegro, Bulgaria, Romania, Sweden, and Norway. Many were later converted into civilian shotguns.

== Honours ==
Krnka was awarded the Order of Saint Stanislaus by Tsar Alexander II, along with honors from Montenegro, Sweden, and Norway.

== Death ==
Krnka died on 4 January 1903 in Michle, now a district of Prague.
