= Roth–Theodorovic pistol =

Roth-Theodorovic
- Type: Semi-automatic pistol
- Place of origin: Austria-Hungary

Production history
- Designer: Wasa Theodorovic
- Designed: 1895
- No. built: About 100

Specifications
- Cartridge: 8×18mm
- Action: Recoil-operated
- Feed system: 10-round magazine
- Sights: Iron sights

The Roth–Theodorovic pistols were a series of semi-automatic pistol prototypes designed by Austrian inventor Wasa Theodorovic with financial support from Georg Roth. Prototypes are associated with model years including 1895, 1897, and 1898. The pistols used a long-recoil, locked-breech operating system and were produced in both single-action and double-action configurations.

The Roth–Theodorovic designs were submitted for Austro-Hungarian military trials, but were not adopted for service or placed into mass production. The prototypes underwent numerous modifications during their development, and later work on the design was undertaken by inventor Karel Krnka.

Early Roth–Theodorovic prototypes were characterized by their large dimensions, elongated grips, and internal magazines loaded from the top. Later versions incorporated a number of design changes, including modifications to the grip and safety arrangements. Although the pistols remained experimental designs, elements of their development were subsequently reflected in later Austrian and Hungarian self-loading pistol designs, including the Frommer Stop and Roth–Steyr M1907.

== See also ==
- Roth–Steyr M1907
