= 8mm Roth–Steyr =

Pistol cartridge

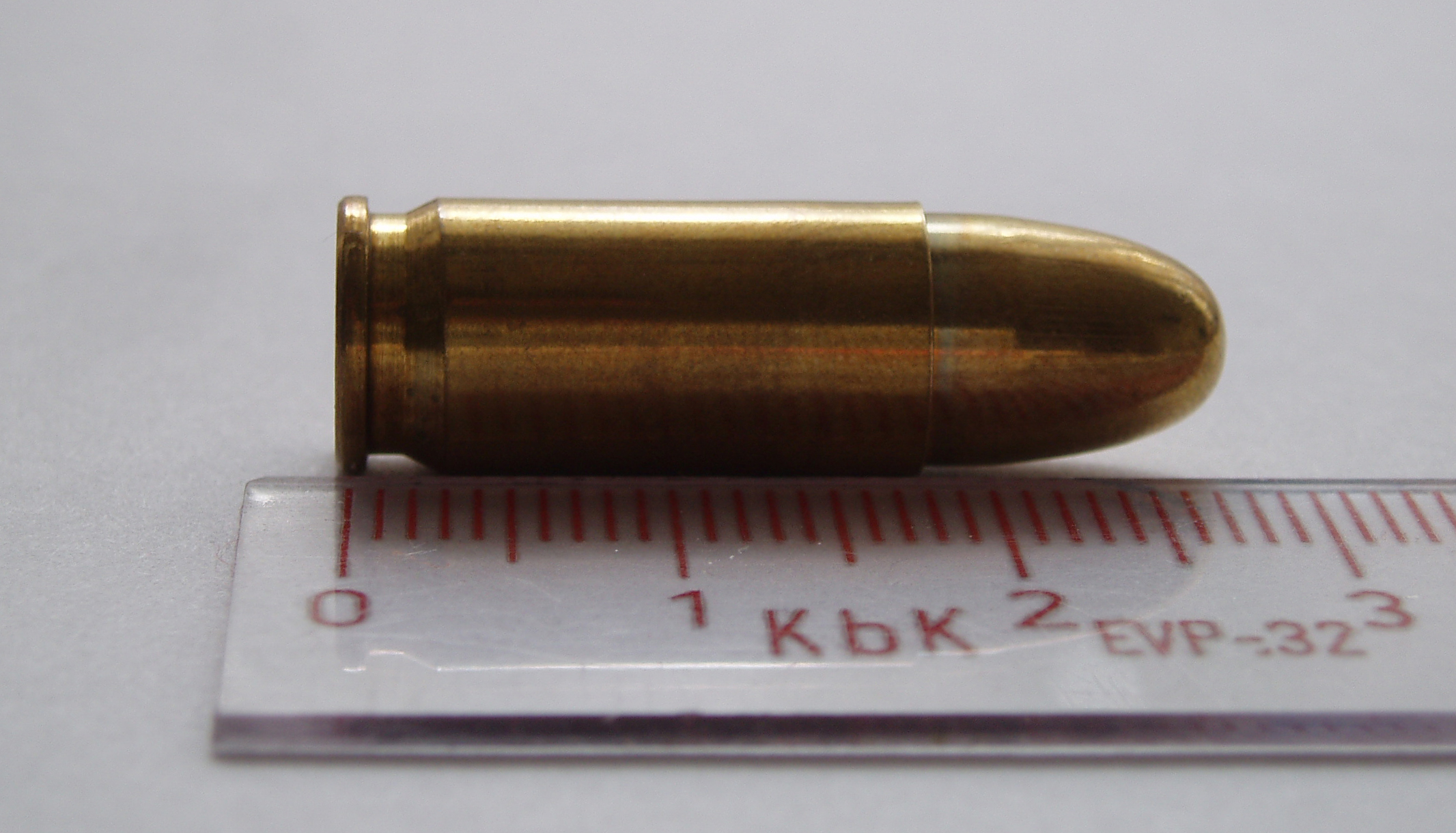
- Type: Pistol
- Place of origin: Austria-Hungary

Specifications
- Case type: Rimless, straight
- Bullet diameter: 8.16 mm (0.321 in)
- Land diameter: 7.90 mm (0.311 in)
- Neck diameter: 8.80 mm (0.346 in)
- Base diameter: 8.85 mm (0.348 in)
- Rim diameter: 8.85 mm (0.348 in)
- Case length: 18.65 mm (0.734 in)
- Overall length: 29.00 mm (1.142 in)

Ballistic performance
Bullet mass/type	Velocity	Energy
116 gr (8 g) FMJ	1,088 ft/s (332 m/s)	302 ft⋅lbf (409 J)
113 gr (7 g) FMJ	1,070 ft/s (330 m/s)	290 ft⋅lbf (390 J)
- Source: "Textbook of Automatic Pistols"

The 8mm Roth–Steyr(8×18.6mm) is a military centerfire pistol cartridge adopted by the Austro-Hungarian cavalry in 1907 for the Repetierpistole M7—the first self-loading pistol adopted by a major military power. The Repetierpistole M7 was intended primarily as a cavalry sidearm, with a heavier trigger pull that was considered safer for cavalry use.

The cartridge was a proprietary 8x18mm round, which headspaces on the mouth of the case. Ammunition was typically packaged in a unique ten-round charger, whose use was (and is) unfamiliar to users of other guns. Austrian military production contained greased un-plated steel-jacketed bullets. A few private firms in Austria manufactured ammunition with cupro-nickel-jacketed bullets.

The Repetierpistole M7 was used by the Austro-Hungarian military through WWI, and saw military and police use in the years following the war, in Italy and several Eastern European countries. The ammunition is said to be "difficult to obtain" as of 2024.

== Synonyms ==
- 8 Steyr
- 8mm Steyr
- 8mm Roth
- 8mm Roth–Steyr
- 8mm Steyr Armee Pistole
- 8×18

== See also ==
- 8 mm caliber
- List of handgun cartridges
- Roth–Steyr M1907
