= Frommer Stop =

Hungarian semi-automatic pistol

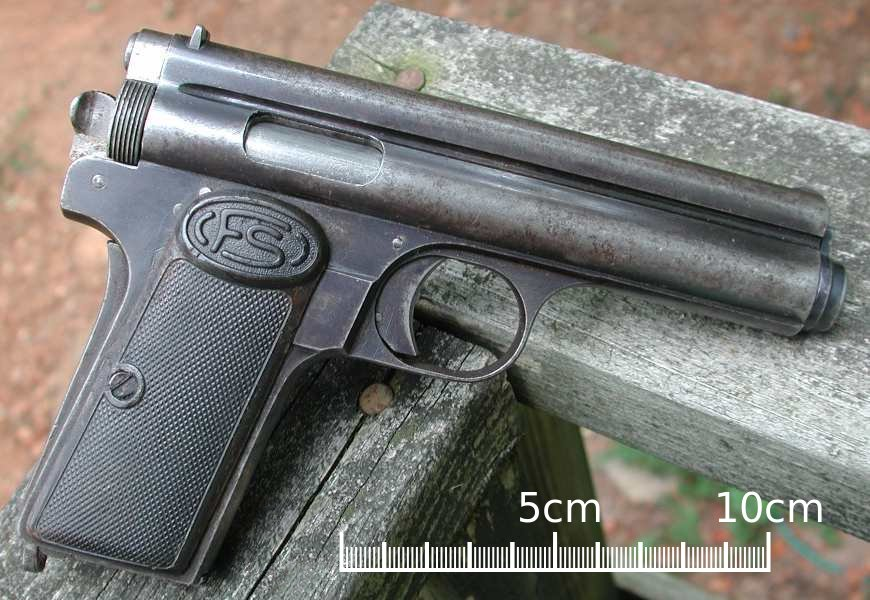
- Frommer Stop chambered in 7.65mm Browning
- Type: Semi-automatic pistol
- Place of origin: Austria-Hungary

Service history
- In service: 1914–1945
- Used by: See § Users
- Wars: World War I; Hungarian–Romanian War; Hungarian–Czechoslovak War; World War II

Production history
- Designer: Rudolf Frommer
- Designed: 1911
- Manufacturer: Fegyver- és Gépgyár
- Produced: 1912–1918, 1919–1929, 1939–1940
- No. built: 365,000
- Variants: See § Variants

Specifications
- Mass: 610 g (22 oz)
- Length: 165 mm (6.5 in)
- Barrel length: 95 millimeters (3.7 in)
- Cartridge: 7.65mm Browning; 9×17mm Short
- Action: Recoil-operated
- Muzzle velocity: 280 m/s (919 ft/s)
- Feed system: 8-round detachable box magazine (7.65mm); 7-round detachable box magazine (9mm)

The Frommer Stop is a Hungarian semi-automatic pistol designed by Rudolf Frommer and manufactured by Fegyver- és Gépgyár (FÉG) in Budapest. It was developed in the early 20th century and became one of the notable Hungarian pistol designs of the period. The pistol was adopted for military service in Austria-Hungary during World War I and was subsequently used in Hungary during the interwar period and World War II.

The Frommer Stop was characterized by its distinctive design and long-recoil operating system. Several variants were produced, including military and compact versions, and the design remained in production in various forms for several decades.

== History ==
The Stop was designed by Rudolf Frommer and adopted by the Austro-Hungarian Army in 1914 as the Pisztoly 12.M alongside the Steyr-Hahn.

== Design ==
The Stop features a 165 millimeters (6.5 in) long frame with a 95 millimeters (3.7 in) 4-groove rifled barrel using a long-recoil, straight-pull, rotating bolt locking action with the barrel and bolt employing independent return springs in a cylindrical housing above the barrel.

Its unloaded weight is 610 g (22 oz), and the detachable box magazine holds eight rounds of 7.65 x 17mm Frommer Long (essentially a higher velocity .32 ACP round).

=== Operation ===
The model designation "Stop" attributed as a marketing allusion to the idea that it would stop your enemy and to a lesser extent its stopping power.

Such a complex locking action is not necessary for .32 ACP and .380 ACP cartridges and later FÉG Frommer 29.M and 37.M pistols used more conventional simple blow-back actions.

The pistol incorporated design features of Frommer's earlier sidearm designs, including the M1901,1906 and M1910 all three of which were inspired by the Roth–Theodorovic pistol.

Using his earlier pistols' basic long-recoil locked action, Frommer redesigned it with a more compact and conventional layout for the Model 1910 and patented it in 1911 for use with the Stop.

=== Ammunition ===
The Frommer Stop was chambered for a 7.65mm cartridge, and optimally fires a proprietary 7.65 Frommer version with a larger powder charge and heavier bullet, which had a crimp in the shell casing at the base. This round achieved a velocity of 920 feet per second (280 m/s) from the gun. The Stop also fires normal .32 ACP ammunition, but with less energetic recoil, ejection, and rechambering.

A 9mm Frommer (a higher velocity .380 ACP or 9mm Kurz) variant of the Stop was produced from 1912 to 1929 for export. This pistol will also shoot normal .380 ACP ammunition, but the hotter loads help drive the long recoil action.

== Variants ==
=== Baby ===
A shortened 57mm barrel, 6 shot version of the 12.M Stop called the "Baby" was manufactured alongside the Stop for commercial sale as a pocket pistol.

=== 39.M ===
A final limited production .380 ACP export-only version of the Stop was reportedly manufactured in 1939 to 1940 as the 39.M.

=== FÉG 37M ===
The last variants of the Frommer pistols were the FÉG Pisztoly 29.M and 37.M which used simple blow-back mechanisms chambered in 9mm Kurz and were unrelated to the Stop design.

=== M.17 Machine pistol variant ===
Beginning in 1916, the Austro-Hungarians made several attempts to replicate the Italian Villar Perosa aircraft submachine gun.

In 1917, FÉG converted two Frommer Stop pistols into automatic machine pistols with 25-round magazines and fitted them side-by-side to a central mount with a tripod.

The machine-pistols were mounted upside-down, and the magazine catches were enlarged for easier unloading. The triggers were removed, and the guns were operated by a set of rods connecting to the spade grips of the mount, which directly engaged the sears. The barrels were lengthened and the cocking mechanisms were redesigned as protruding arms, which were engaged by a set of hinged retracting levers.

This submachine gun was designed to be used as a light machine gun like the Villar Perosa. Although it was tested by the Austro-Hungarian Army, it was not successful and was only made in small numbers.

The Frommer machine-pistol was succeeded later in 1917 by the more successful Škoda of Plzeň Sturmpistole (not to be confused with the German World War II flare and grenade launcher,) a direct copy of the Villar Perosa.

== Adoption ==
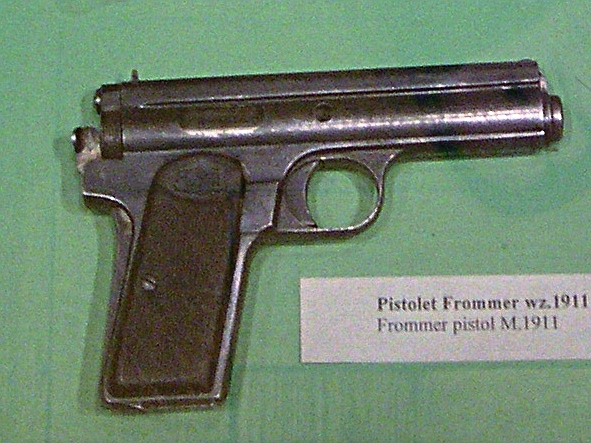
MWP Frommer wz. 1911

The pistol was manufactured in various forms from 1912 to 1929 and was also used by various nations in World War I and World War II.

== Users ==
- Austria-Hungary
- Bulgaria
- Czechoslovakia
- Austria
- Germany
- Ottoman Empire
- Hungary
- Poland — issued in limited numbers as the Pistolet Frommer wz.1911

== See also ==
- Roth–Steyr M1907
