= Karel Krnka =

Czech inventor (1858–1926)

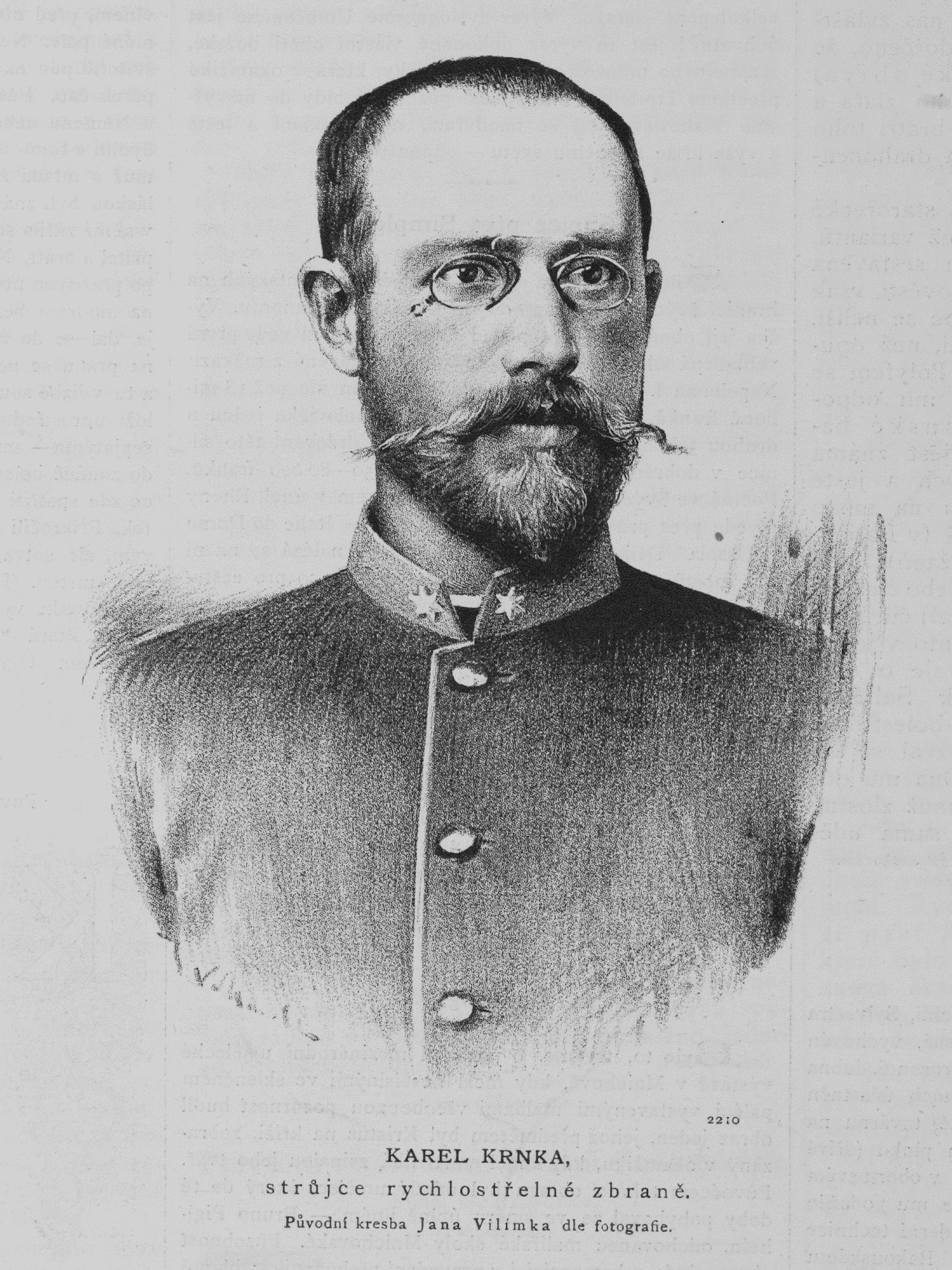
- Karel Krnka, illustrated by Jan Vilímek

Personal details
- Born: 6 April 1858 Oradea, Austrian Empire
- Died: 25 February 1926 (aged 67) Prague, Czechoslovakia
- Parent: Sylvester Krnka (father)

Karel Krnka (1858–1926) was a Czech gunsmith and inventor. He is known for his involvement in the design of early semi-automatic pistols.

== Biography ==
Karel Krnka was the son of Sylvestr Krnka.

In 1887, Krnka moved to England and began working at a weapons factory in Birmingham. Around this time, he attempted to modernize the Werndl–Holub rifle. When the company he was working for in England went bankrupt, Krnka returned home to Prague.

In 1906, the Roth–Krnka M.7 pistol designed by Krnka was adopted as the standard sidearm of the Austro-Hungarian Army.

After the establishment of Czechoslovakia in 1918, he offered his services to the Czechoslovak government, returning to Prague in 1922. He first worked at a small arms factory in Prague-Vršovice, then later for Zbrojovka Brno from the spring of 1925 until his death.

== See also ==
- Rudolf Frommer
