= Rudolf Frommer =

Hungarian weapon designer

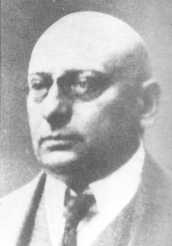
- Born: 4 August 1868; Budapest, Hungary
- Died: 1 September 1936 (aged 68); Hungary
- Occupations: Inventor, Banker
- Title: Fegyverneki

Rudolf Frommer (fegyverneki Frommer Rudolf; 1868 – 1936) was a Hungarian weapon designer of Jewish descent. He was employed by Fegyver és Gépgyár, becoming its managing director from 1914 until his retirement in 1935, except for a short period in 1919–1920 after being fired during the Hungarian Soviet Republic. He was ennobled with the pre-name 'fegyverneki' by Franz Joseph I for his achievements in weapons design. He had over 100 patents, among them semi-automatic handguns starting in 1901, and including the Frommer 1910 in 7.65mm Roth, the Frommer Stop in .32 ACP, the Liliput 6.35 mm (.25 ACP) pocket pistol, and the 37M.

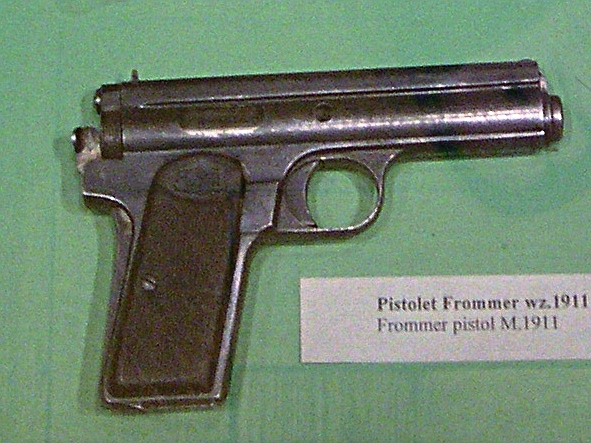
Frommer wz.1911 pistol, Polish Army Museum in Warsaw.
