= List of infantry weapons of World War I =

This is a list of World War I infantry weapons.

== Austro-Hungarian Empire ==
Edged weapons

- M1858/61 Kavalleriesäbel
- M1862 Infanteriesäbel
- M1873 Artilleriesäbel
- M1904 Kavalleriesäbel
- M1915 Pioneer sword
- M1888 Mannlicher Knife Bayonet
- M1895 Mannlicher Knife Bayonet
- M1895 Mannlicher Ersatz Bayonet

Flare guns

- Hebel M1894

Sidearms

- Browning FN M1900
- Dreyse M1907
- Frommer M1912 Stop
- Gasser M1870, M1870/84 and M1873
- Gasser-Kropatschek M1876
- Gasser Montenegrin
- Mannlicher M1901
- Mannlicher M1905
- Mauser C96
- Rast & Gasser M1898
- Roth–Sauer M1900
- Roth–Steyr M1907
- Steyr M1912
- Steyr-Pieper M1908
- Steyr-Pieper M1909

Submachine guns

- Anschlagspistole M.12
- FIAT Mod.1915 (Captured)
- Sturmpistole M.18

Rifles

- GRC Gewehr 88
- Carcano M1891 (captured)
- Kropatschek
- Mannlicher M1886/88
- Mannlicher M1888 and M1888/90
- Mannlicher M1890 carbine
- Mannlicher M1893
- Mannlicher M1895 (Standard issue rifle)
- Mannlicher–Schönauer M1903/14
- Mauser Gewehr 98
- Mauser M1903 (captured)
- Mauser M1899 (captured)
- Mauser M1910 (captured)
- Mosin–Nagant 1891 and 1907 (captured in high quantities from Russians)
- Steyr–Mauser M1912
- Wänzl M1867 (rear echolon)
- Werndl–Holub M1867 (rear echolon)

Machine guns

- DWM MG 08
- MG 08/15
- Madsen M1905
- Montigny Mitrailleuse
- Schwarzlose M1907 and M1907/12
- Schwarzlose M1916 and M1916A
- Škoda M1893 and M1902
- Škoda M1909 and M1913

Grenades

- M1915, M1916 and M1917 Stielhandgranate
- M1917 Eierhandgranate
- Rohr Handgranate

Flamethrowers

- Flammenwerfer M1916
- Kleinflammenwerfer M1911

Mortars

- 7.5cm M1917 Minenwerfer
- 9cm M1914 and M1914/16 Minenwerfer
- 9cm M1917 Minenwerfer
- 12cm M1915 Minenwerfer
- 12cm M1916 Luftminenwerfer
- Ehrhardt 10.5cm M1915 Luftminenwerfer
- Esslingen 15cm M1915 Luftminenwerfer
- Granatenwerfer 16
- Lanz 9.15cm M1914 leicht Minenwerfer
- Roka-Halasz 8cm M1915 Luftminenwerfer
- Schnellwerfer (Grenade mortar)
- Škoda 14cm M1915 and M1916 Minenwerfer

Support guns

- Škoda 3.7cm M1915 Infanteriegeschutz

== First Brazilian Republic ==
Sidearms

- Luger P08
- Brazilian 1883 Nagant

Rifles

- Mauser 1908
- Mauser-Verqueiro M1904
- M1873 Brazilian Comblain
- Brazilian Comblain Carbine Model 92

Machine guns

- Hotchkiss M1909
- Hotchkiss M1914
- Madsen 1907

== Kingdom of Belgium ==
Sidearms

- Browning FN M1900
- Browning FN M1903
- Browning FN M1910
- Colt M1903 Pocket Hammerless
- Nagant M1895
- Ruby M1914

Shotguns

- Browning Auto-5 (Used by Garde Civique)

Rifles

- Gewehr M1898
- Berthier M1907
- Comblain M1882, M1883 and M1888
- Gras M1874
- Lebel M1886/93
- Mauser M1889 (Standard issue rifle. Also known as the Belgian Mauser)
- Mauser M1893
- Albini-Braendlin rifle (used in the colonies)

Machine guns

- Chauchat M1915
- Colt–Browning M1895/14
- Hotchkiss M1909
- Hotchkiss M1914
- Lewis M1914
- Maxim M1911
- Madsen 1905

Grenades

- F1 M1915, M1916 and M1917
- No.5, No.23 and No.36 (Also known as "Mills")
- Viven-Bessières M1916 rifle grenade

Mortars

- Saint Chamond 142mm M1915 Delattre
- Schneider 75mm M1915
- Van Deuren 70mm M1915

== British Empire ==
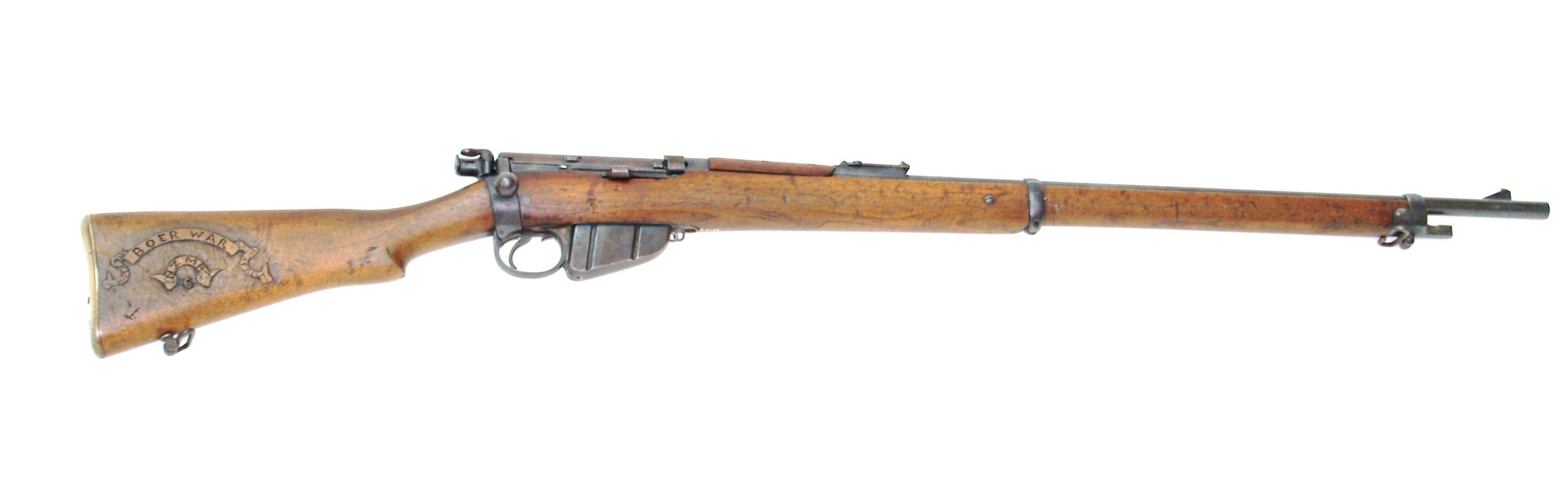
Lee-Enfield Magazine Mark I* rifle ("long Tom")

Edged weapons

- Kukri knife (Used by Gurkha regiments)
- Pattern 1907 bayonet
- Pattern P1897 officer's sword
- Pistol bayonet

Flare guns

- Webley & Scott Mark III

Sidearms

- Colt M1903 Pocket Hammerless
- Colt M1909 New Service
- Colt M1911
- Enfield Mk I and Mk II
- Mauser C96
- Smith & Wesson M1899
- Smith & Wesson No.3
- Smith & Wesson Triple Lock
- Webley–Fosbery Automatic (Private purchase by officers only)
- Webley M1872 British Bull Dog
- Webley Mk IV, Mk V and Mk VI
- Webley Self-Loading Mk I

Rifles

- Arisaka Type 30 (Royal Navy and home defence only)
- Arisaka Type 38
- Elephant gun (Ad hoc use against sniper armour)
- Enfield Pattern P1914
- Farquhar–Hill Pattern P1918 (Troop trials only)
- Lee–Enfield Short Magazine Mk I, Mk II and Mk III
- Lee–Metford Mk I and Mk II
- Lee–Speed No.1 and No.2
- Mauser–Vergueiro M1904 (Used by South African units)
- Martini–Enfield Mk I and Mk II
- Martini–Henry
- Remington Model 14-1/2
- Ross Mark III (Canadian service)
- Winchester M1892 (Royal Navy)
- Winchester M1894 (Royal Navy shipboard use)
- Winchester M1907 (120 rifles for Royal Flying Corps)
- Vergueiro 1904 (Used by Union of South Africa)

Machine guns

- Colt–Browning M1895/14
- Hotchkiss Mk I
- Lewis Mk I
- Rexer Madsen machine gun
- Maxim M1884
- Vickers machine gun

Grenades

- No.1 grenade
- No.2 grenade (Also known as "Hales")
- No.3 rifle grenade (Also known as "Hales")
- No.5, No.23 and No.36 grenade (Also known as "Mills")
- No.6 and No.7 grenade
- No.8 and No.9 double cylinder grenade (Also known as "Jam tin")
- No.15 and No.16 grenade (Also known as "Ball")
- No.17 rifle grenade
- No.20 rifle grenade
- No.22 rifle grenade
- No.24 rifle grenade
- No.35 rifle grenade
- No.44 rifle grenade

Obstacle clearing explosive charges

- McClintock Bangalore torpedo

Flamethrowers

- Hay portable flamethrower
- Morriss portable flamethrower

Mortars

- 2-inch mortar
- 3.7-inch mortar
- 4-inch mortar
- Garland trench mortar
- Livens Projector
- Newton 6-inch mortar
- Stokes mortar
- Vickers 1.57-inch mortar

Projectile weapons

- Leach Trench Catapult
- Sauterelle
- West Spring Gun

Anti-aircraft weapons

- Maxim QF 1-pounder pom-pom
- QF 2-pounder naval AA gun (Sixteen guns)
- QF 12-pounder 12 cwt AA gun
- QF 13-pounder Mk IV AA gun (Six guns)
- QF 13-pounder 9 cwt AA gun
- QF 13-pounder 6 cwt AA gun

== Kingdom of Bulgaria ==
Sidearms

- Beholla M1915
- Browning FN M1903
- Frommer M1912 Stop
- Luger P08
- Mauser C96
- Nagant M1895
- Smith & Wesson No.3

Rifles

- Berdan M1870
- Gras M1874
- Krnka M1867
- Mannlicher M1886/88
- Mannlicher M1888 and M1888/90
- Mannlicher M1890
- Mannlicher M1895 (Standard issue rifle)
- Mauser Gewehr 71
- Mauser M1899
- Mauser M1891
- Mauser M1893
- Mauser M1903
- Mosin–Nagant M1891
- Peabody–Martini–Henry M1874

Machine guns

- DWM MG 08
- Maxim M1904 and M1907
- Saint Étienne M1907
- Schmeisser-Dreyse MG 12
- Schwarzlose M1907/12

Flamethrowers

- Kleinflammenwerfer M1911

Infantry mortar

- Granatenwerfer 16

== Republic of China ==
Edged weapons

- Da Dao

Sidearms

- Mauser C96
- Mauser 1914
- FN 1900

Rifle

- Hanyang 88
- Mauser 1907
- Mauser Type 1
- Mauser Type 4
- General Liu Rifle

Machine Gun

- Maxim machine gun
- Vickers machine gun
- Madsen

Grenade

- Stielhandgranate

== French Republic ==
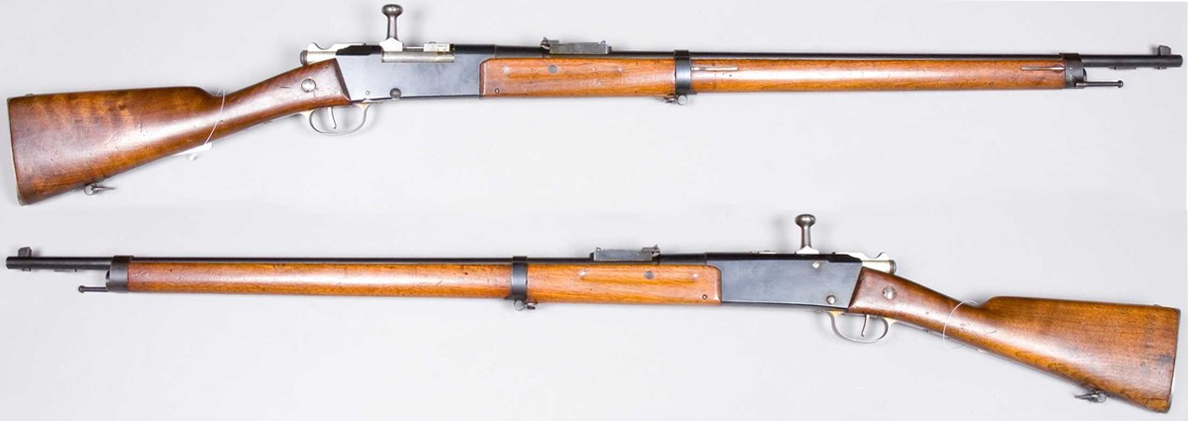
Lebel M1886 rifle

Edged weapons

- Clou Français (Nail knife)
- Lebel M1886/14 poignard baïonnette (Dagger bayonet)
- M1882 le sabre d'officier d'infanterie (Sword)
- M1916 couteau poignard (Knife dagger, also known as Le Vengeur)

Sidearms

- Browning FN M1900
- Chamelot–Delvigne M1873 and M1874
- Colt M1892
- Colt M1911
- Ruby M1914
- Saint Étienne M1892
- Savage M1907
- Smith & Wesson M1899
- Star M1914

Rifles

- Berthier M1890, M1892, M1892/16, M1902, M1907, M1907/15 and M1916
- Chassepot M1866/74
- Gras M1874 and M1874/14
- Kropatschek M1884 and M1885
- Lebel M1886/93 (Standard issue rifle)
- Lee–Metford Mk I and Mk II
- Meunier A6
- Remington M1867 and M1914 Rolling Block
- FN Browning 1900 carbine
- Remington–Lee M1887
- RSC M1917 and M1918
- Winchester M1894
- Winchester M1907
- Winchester M1910

Machine guns

- Chauchat M1915
- Colt–Browning M1895/14
- Darne M1916
- Hotchkiss M1909
- Hotchkiss M1914
- Puteaux M1905
- Saint Étienne M1907 and M1907/16

Grenades

- Bezossi M1915
- F1 M1915, M1916 and M1917
- OF1 M1915 grenade
- P1 M1915 grenade
- Suffocante M1914 and M1916 gas grenade
- M1847 ball grenade
- M1914 ball grenade
- M1918 anti-tank grenade
- Pig iron lighting grenade
- Bertrand M1915 and M1916 gas grenade
- Foug M1916 grenade
- IIIrd army grenade
- DR M1916 rifle grenade
- Feuillette rifle grenade
- Viven-Bessières M1916 rifle grenade

Obstacle clearing explosive charges

- Barbed wire destruction rod grenade

Flamethrowers

- P3 and P4 portable flamethrower
- Schilt portable flamethrower

Mortars

- Aasen 88.9mm M1915
- Saint Étienne 58mm T No.1
- Saint Étienne 58mm T No.2
- Schneider 75mm M1915
- Van Deuren 70mm M1915

Projectile weapons

- Sauterelle

Support guns

- Puteaux 37mm M1916

== Kingdom of Hejaz (and Arab tribes) ==
Edged weapons

- Jambiya
- Khanjar
- M1853/72 Martini Henry Socket Bayonet
- Sabre

Sidearms

- Smith & Wesson M1889
- Colt M1873 Single Action Army

Rifles

- Arisaka Type 30 (Given by the British Royal Navy)
- Jezail
- Lee-Enfield
- Lee-Metford
- Mauser M1893 (Mostly captured by Ottoman forces)
- Martini-Henry
- Lebel Model 1886

Machine guns

- Vickers Mk I
- Maxim gun

== German Empire ==
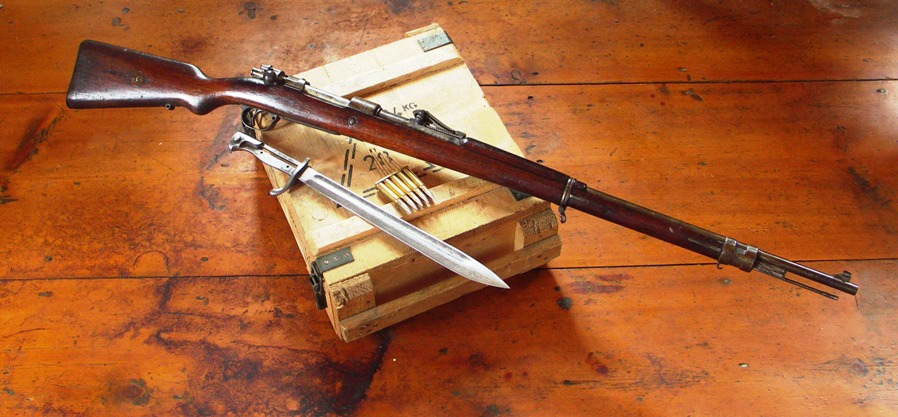
Mauser Gewehr 98 rifle and bayonet

Edged weapons

- M1889 Infanteriesäbel (Sword)
- Seitengewehr 84/98 III (Bayonet)
- Seitengewehr 98/05 (Bayonet)

Gases

- Mustard gas (Gas)

Flare guns

- Hebel M1894

Sidearms

- Bayard M1908
- Beholla M1915
- Bergmann–Bayard M1910
- Dreyse M1907
- FN 1903
- FN 1900
- FN 1910
- Frommer M1912 Stop
- Langenhan M1914 Selbstlader
- Luger P04 and P08
- Mauser C96
- Mauser C78 and C86 Zig-Zag
- Mauser M1910 and M1914
- Reichsrevolver M1879 and M1883
- Sauer 1913
- Roth Sauer 1900 (used in South West Africa)
- Schwarzlose M1908
- Steyr M1912
- Walther Model 4
- Walther Model 6

Submachine guns

- Bergmann MP 18-I
- FIAT Mod.1915 (Captured)

Rifles

- Elefantengewehr
- GRC Gewehr 88/05, Gewehr 88/14, Gewehr 91 and Karabiner 88
- Mauser Gewehr 71 and 71/84
- Mauser Gewehr 98 (Standard issue rifle)
- Mauser Karabiner 98a
- Mauser M1887(Issued by the rear echelon units)
- Mauser M1915 and M1916 Selbstlader
- Mondragón M1908
- Mosin (Captured)
- Ross Rifle (Captured)
- Beaumont Vitali M1871/88 (reported use by Bavarian rear echelon units, captured in Liège)
- Comblain rifle (captured)
- Mauser M1889 (captured)
- Lebel M1886 (captured)
- Vergueiro M1904 (captured and used in German East Africa)
- Lee Enfield (captured and used in German East Africa)
- Mauser M1907 (Chinese Mausers converted to 7,92 mm x 57 mm)

Machine guns

- Bergmann MG 15 (Water cooled version)
- Bergmann MG 15nA (Air cooled version)
- Chauchat (captured)
- Lewis machine gun (captured)
- DWM MG 99, MG 01, MG 08, MG 08/15, MG 08/18 and MG 09
- DWM Parabellum MG 14 and MG 14/17
- Gast M1917
- Madsen M1902
- Schmeisser-Dreyse MG 12, MG 15 and MG 18

Grenades

- M1913 Karabingranate
- M1914 Karabingranate
- M1917 Karabingranate
- M1913 Kugelhandgranate
- M1915 Kugelhandgranate NA
- M1915 Diskushandgranate (Offensive version and defensive version)
- M1915, M1916 and M1917 Stielhandgranate
- M1917 Eierhandgranate

Anti-tank mines

- Flachmine 17

Flamethrowers

- Flammenwerfer M1916
- Kleinflammenwerfer M1911
- Wechselapparat Flammenwerfer M1917

Mortars

- Granatenwerfer 16
- Lanz 9.15cm M1914 leicht Minenwerfer
- Rheinmetall 7.58cm M1914 leicht Minenwerfer AA and NA
- Rheinmetall 17cm M1913 mittler Minenwerfer

Support guns

- Krupp 7.62cm L/16.5 Infanteriegeschütz
- Krupp 7.7cm L/20 Infanteriegeschütz
- Krupp 7.7cm L/27 Infanteriegeschütz

Anti-tank weapons

- Becker 2cm M2 Tankabwehrgewehr
- DWM 1.32cm MG 18 Tank und Flieger
- Mauser 1.3cm M1918 Tankgewehr
- Rheinmetall 3.7cm M1918 Tankabwehrkanone

Anti-aircraft weapons

- Becker 2cm M2 Flugzeugabwehrgewehr
- DWM 1.32cm MG 18 Tank und Flieger
- Krupp 3.7cm L/14.5 Sockelflugzeugabwehrkanone
- Krupp 7.62cm L/30 Flugzeugabwehrkanone
- Krupp 7.7cm L/27 Flugzeugabwehrkanone
- Krupp 7.7cm L/35 Flugzeugabwehrkanone

== Kingdom of Greece ==
Edged weapons

- Bayonet
- Improvised knife

Sidearms

- Bergmann-Bayard M1903, M1908, and M1910
- Browning FN M1900
- Browning FN M1903
- Chamelot-Delvigne M1873, M1874 and M1884
- Colt M1907 Army Special
- Mannlicher M1901
- Mylonas rifle
- Nagant M1895 (known as the Περίστροφον M1895)
- Ruby M1914

Rifles

- Berthier M1892, M1892/16, M1907/15 and M1916
- Gras M1874 and M1874/14
- Lebel M1886/93
- Mannlicher M1895
- Mannlicher-Schönauer M1903 and M1903/14 (Standard issue rifle)

Machine guns

- Chauchat M1915
- Colt-Browning M1895/14
- Hotchkiss M1914
- Saint Étienne M1907/16
- Schwarzlose M1907/12

Grenades

- F1 M1915, M1916 and M1917
- Improvised bombs and grenades

Mortars

- Aasen 88.9mm M1915
- Stokes mortar

== Kingdom of Italy ==
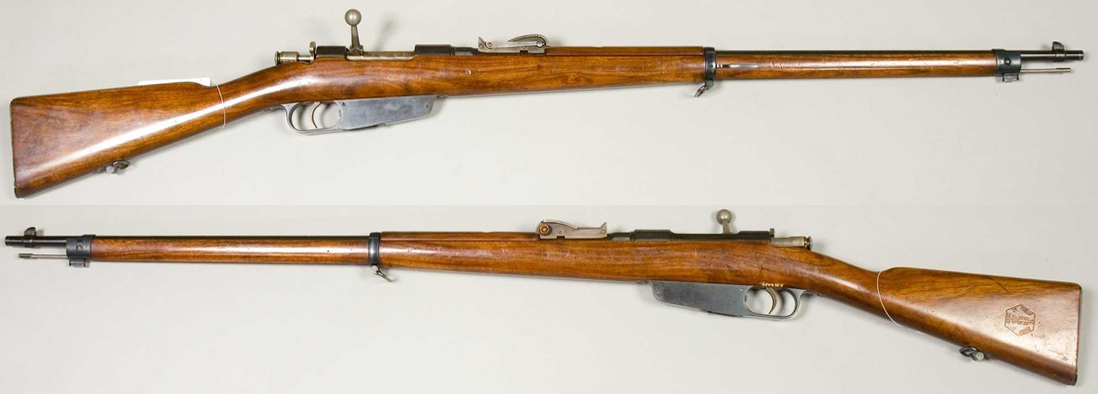
Carcano M1891

Edged weapons

- M1891 sciabola baionetta (Sword bayonet)

Sidearms

- Beretta M1915
- Bodeo M1889
- Brixia Model 1913
- Chamelot–Delvigne M1873 and M1874
- Glisenti M1910
- Mauser C96
- Ruby M1914
- Smith & Wesson No.3

Submachine guns

- Carabinetta Automatica O.V.P
- FIAT Mod.1915

Rifles

- Berthier M1892, M1892/16, M1907/15
- Carcano M1891 (Standard issue rifle)
- Lebel M1886/93
- Vetterli M1870, M1870/87 and M1870/87/15

Machine guns

- Chauchat M1915
- Colt–Browning M1895/14
- Fiat–Revelli M1914
- Gardner M1886
- Hotchkiss M1914
- Lewis Mk I
- Maxim M1906 and M1911
- Nordenfelt M1884
- Perino M1908
- Saint Étienne M1907
- Vickers Mk I
- SIA Modelo 1918
- Madsen machine gun

Grenades

- Bezossi M1915
- Lenticolare M1914
- Baldari grenade

Flamethrowers

- Schilt portable flamethrower
- Lanciafiamme Portiale DLF

Mortars

- Stokes mortar
- Saint Étienne 58mm T No.2

== Kingdom of Siam ==
Sidearms

- Mauser C96
- FN M1900
- FN Model 1910
- Luger pistol
- 1902 Nambu
- Nambu Automatic Pistol Type A
- Type 26 revolver

Rifles

- Mauser Model 1871
- Mannlicher M1888
- Mannlicher M1890 carbine
- Siamese Mauser style rifle (Standard issue rifle)

Machine gun

- Gatling gun (Pre World War 1)

Field guns

- Krupp 50mm Mountain Gun
- Krupp 7.5 cm Model 1903

Naval artillery

- BL 6-inch gun Mk V (Coast defence gun)

== Empire of Japan ==
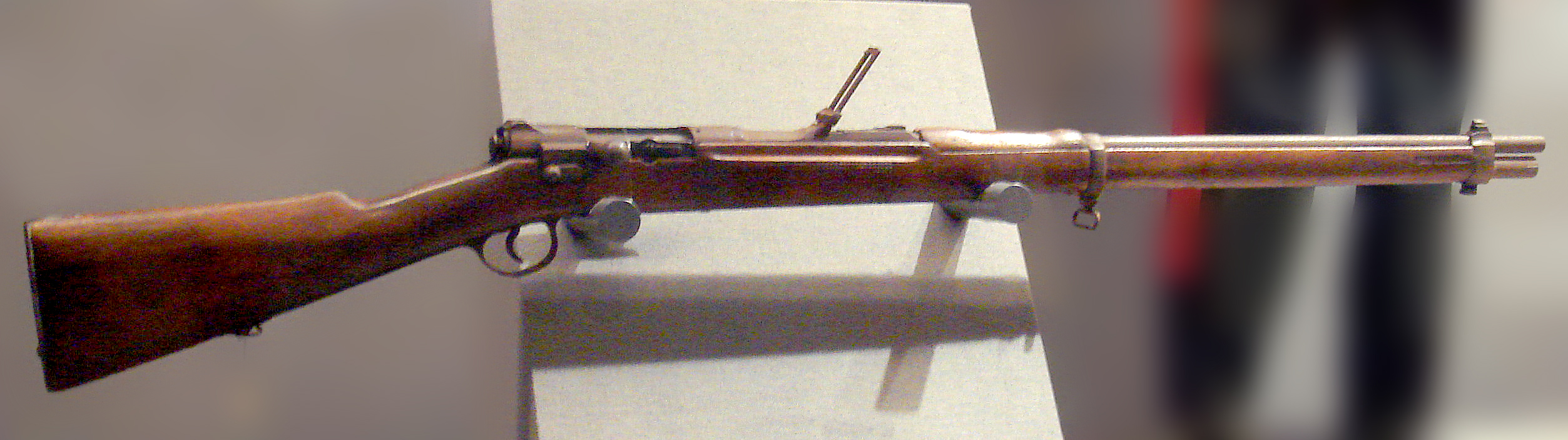
Murata rifle

Edged weapons

- Guntō sword
- Type 30 bayonet

Sidearms

- Hino–Komuro M1908
- Meiji Type 26
- Nambu Type B
- Smith & Wesson No.3

Rifles

- Arisaka Type 30
- Arisaka Type 35
- Arisaka Type 38 (Standard issue rifle)
- Arisaka Type 44 Carbine
- Murata Type 13, Type 18 and Type 22
- Snider-Enfield

Machine guns

- Hotchkiss M1900
- Meiji Type 21
- Nambu Type 3

== Kingdom of Montenegro ==
Sidearms

- Gasser M1870/74 and M1880
- Mannlicher M1901
- Rast & Gasser M1898
- Smith & Wesson M1899
- Smith & Wesson No.3

Rifles

- Berdan M1870
- Gras M1874
- Mosin–Nagant M1891
- Wänzl M1867
- Werndl-Holub M1867

Machine guns

- DWM MG 08
- Maxim M1906 and M1912
- Nordenfelt multiple barrel gun
- Gatling-Gorlov M1871

== Ottoman Empire ==
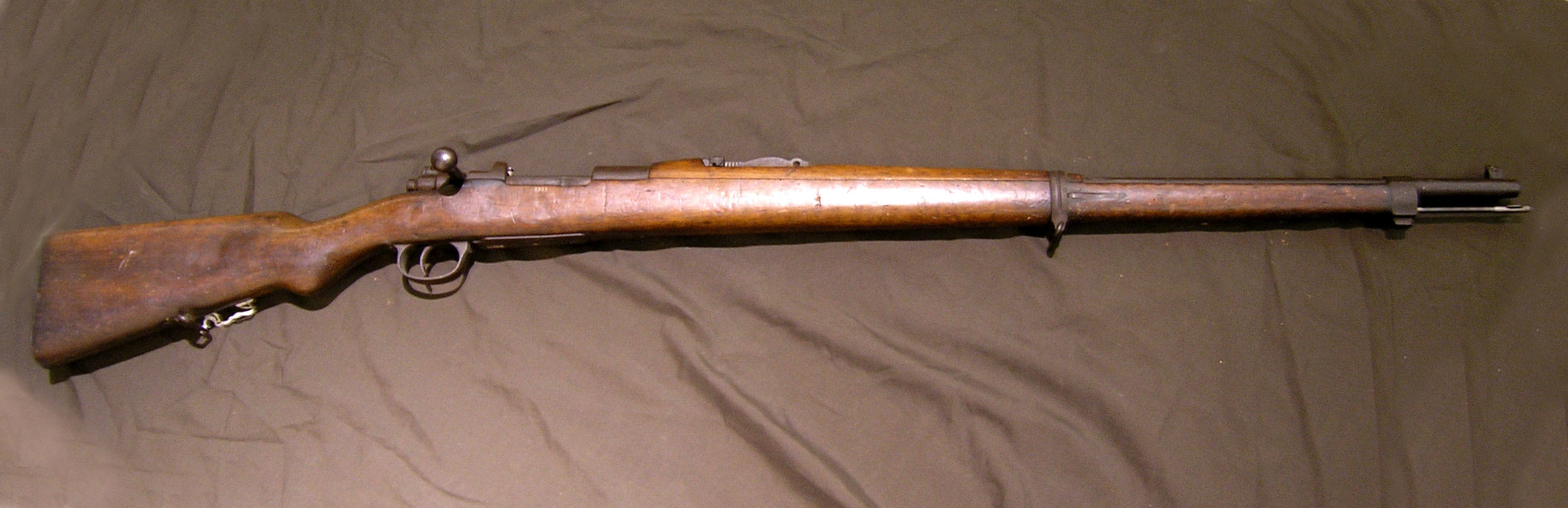
Mauser M 1903

Edged weapons

- Lance (only used by cavalry regiments)
- Trench club
- Sabre (used by officers and cavalry regiments)
- Khanjar, or Enveriye dagger
- Yatagan
- M1890 bayonets

Sidearms

- Beholla M1915
- British Bull Dog revolver
- Browning FN M1903
- Frommer M1912 Stop
- Luger P08
- Mauser C96
- Smith & Wesson No.3

Submachine guns

- MP-18

Rifles

- Mauser 1887
- Berdan rifle
- GRC Gewehr 88/05
- Martini–Henry Mk I
- Mauser M1890
- Mauser M1893 (Standard issue rifle)
- Mauser M1903, M1905 and M1908
- Mosin–Nagant M1891 (given by Austria-Hungary which were captured in high quantities from Russians)
- Peabody–Martini–Henry M1874
- Remington M1866 Rolling Block
- Snider–Enfield Mk III
- Winchester M1866

Machine guns

- Bergmann MG15nA
- DWM MG 08 and MG 08/15
- Hotchkiss M1909
- Hotchkiss M1900
- Maxim machine gun
- Nordenfelt multiple barrel gun
- Schwarzlose M1907/12
- Vickers machine gun
- Lewis Gun

Grenades

- M1915, M1916 and M1917 Stielhandgranate
- Ottoman Type 2 grenade

Flamethrowers

- Kleinflammenwerfer M1911
- Wechselapparat

Infantry mortar

- Granatenwerfer 16

== Portuguese Republic ==
Sidearms

- Luger P08
- Mauser C96
- Savage M1907
- Abadie 1886

Rifles

- Steyr-Kropatschek M1886
- Lee–Enfield Short Magazine Mk III (Used by Portuguese forces on the Western Front)
- Mauser-Vergueiro M1904 (Standard issue rifle)
- Portuguese Mannlicher M1896
- Snider (used in the colonies)

Machine guns

- Lewis M1917
- Lewis Mk I
- Vickers Mk I

Mortars

- Stokes mortar

== Kingdom of Romania ==
Edged weapons

- Sabie de artilerie Model 1890
- Sabie de cavalerie Model 1906
- Sabie de ofițer Model 1893
- Sabie de ofițer cavalerie Model 1909
- Cavalry lance Model 1908

Sidearms

- Bayard M1915
- Ruby M1914
- Saint Étienne M1892
- Smith & Wesson No.3
- Steyr M1912

Rifles

- Berthier M1907/15
- Lebel M1886/93
- Mannlicher M1888/90
- Mannlicher M1893 (Standard issue rifle. Also known as the M93)
- Mannlicher M1895
- Mosin–Nagant M1891
- Martini–Henry M1879
- Vetterli-Vitali M1870/87

Machine guns

- Chauchat M1915
- Colt–Browning M1895/14
- DWM MG 08
- Hotchkiss M1914
- Lewis Mk I
- Maxim M1907 and M1909
- Saint Étienne M1907
- Schwarzlose M1907/12
- Vickers Mk I

Grenades

- F1 M1915, M1916 and M1917
- Savopol grenade

Mortars

- Saint Étienne 58mm T No.2

Support guns

- Gruson 53 mm Model 1887/1916

== Russian Empire ==
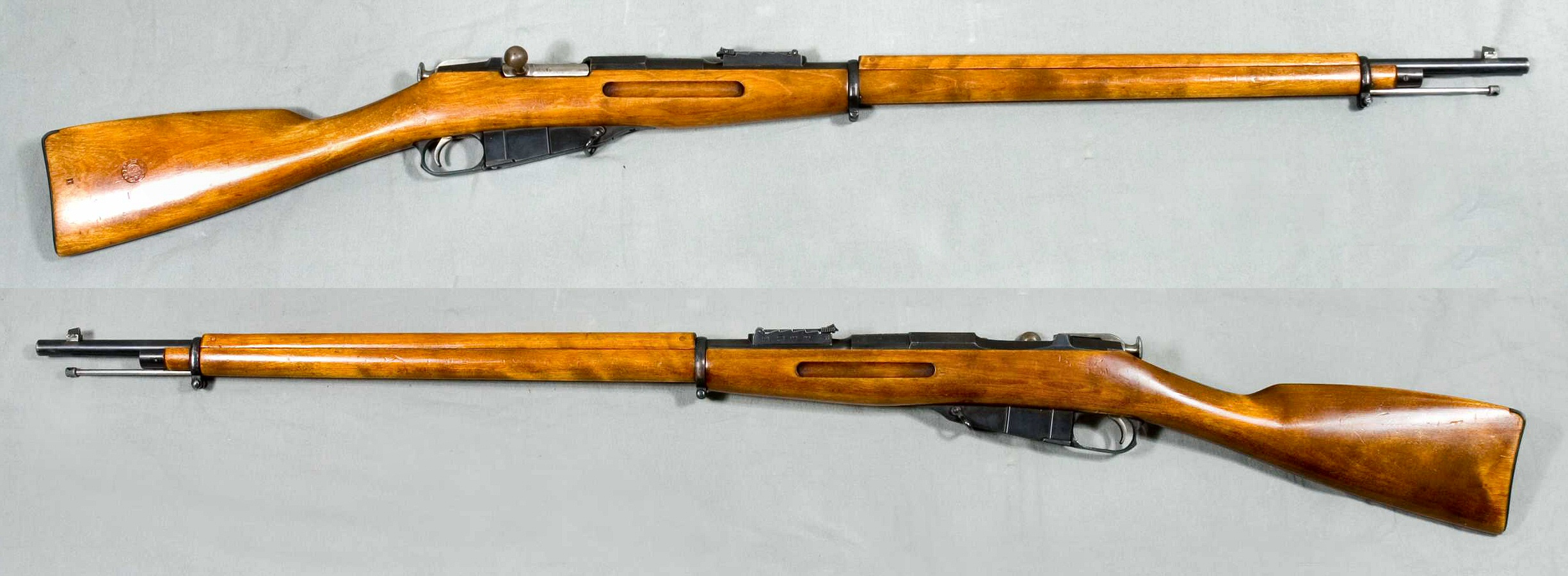
Mosin-Nagant M1891 rifle

Edged weapons

- Khanjali dagger sword (Also known as Kinzhal)
- Shashka sword

Sidearms

- Browning FN M1903
- FN 1900
- FN 1905
- Colt M1911
- Mauser C96
- Nagant M1895
- Smith & Wesson No.3

Rifles

- Arisaka Type 30
- Arisaka Type 35
- Arisaka Type 38
- Berdan M1868 and M1870
- Chassepot M1866/74
- Fedorov M1916 Avtomat
- Fedorov M1913 and M1913/16
- Gras M1874
- Krnka M1867
- Kropatschek M1878 and M1884
- Lebel M1886/93
- Mosin–Nagant M1891 and M1907 (Standard issue rifle)
- Martini-Henry
- Remington M1910 Rolling Block
- Snider-Enfield
- Vetterli M1870/87 (Purchased from Italy)
- Winchester M1895
- Winchester M1907
- Winchester M1910

Machine guns

- Chauchat M1915
- Colt–Browning M1895/14
- Hotchkiss M1909
- Lewis Mk I and M1917
- Madsen M1902
- Maxim M1905
- Maxim PM M1910
- Vickers Mk I

Grenades

- Rdultovsky M1912 lantern grenade
- Rdultovsky M1914 and M1917

Flamethrowers

- Tovarnitski portable flamethrower

Mortars

- Aasen 88.9mm M1915
- GR 90mm M1915

Support guns

- Rosenberg 37mm M1915

== Russian SFSR (until March 8, 1918) ==
Sidearms

- Mauser C96 (Captured)
- Colt M1911 (Captured)
- Smith & Wesson Model 3
- Luger P08
- Nagant M1895
- FN 1900

Rifles

- Mannlicher M1888
- Mannlicher M1895
- Gewehr 98
- Mosin-Nagant M1891 (Standard issue rifle)
- Kropatschek (Captured)
- Vetterli Vitali M1870/87
- Winchester M1895
- Arisaka Type 30
- Arisaka Type 38
- Ross Rifle
- Fedorov Avtomat
- Berdan II
- Berthier M1907/15
- Lebel M1886

Machine Guns

- Chauchat
- Hotchkiss Mle 1914
- Maxim machine gun
- Lewis machine gun
- Madsen machine gun

== Sublime State of Persia ==
Sidearms

- Mauser C96
- Modèle 1892 revolver
- Gasser M1870/74
- Smith & Wesson No.3

Rifles

- Berdan M1870
- Iranian Mauser M1900 (Standard issue rifle)
- Peabody–Martini–Henry M1874

Machine guns

- Gatling gun
- Lewis gun
- Maxim M1904 and M1907
- Vickers machine gun

== Kingdom of Serbia ==
Sidearms

- Chamelot–Delvigne M1873, M1874 and M1876
- Gasser M1870/74
- Luger P08
- Mauser C96
- Lefaucheux-Francotte M. 71
- Nagant M1891
- Ruby M1914
- Smith & Wesson Model 3

Rifles

- Berdan M1868 and M1870
- Berthier M1892, M1892/16 and M1907/15
- Gras M1874
- Lebel M1886/93
- Peabody M1870
- Snider-Enfield
- Mauser-Koka
- Mauser M1899
- Mauser M1910 (Standard issue rifle)
- Martini-Henry
- Mosin–Nagant M1891
- Wänzl rifle
- Winchester M1873
- Werndl-Holub rifle

Machine guns

- Chauchat M1915
- DWM MG 08
- Hotchkiss M1914
- Lewis Mk I
- Maxim M1909
- PM M1910
- Schwarzlose M1907/12

Grenades

- Vasić M12

Flamethrowers

- Schilt portable flamethrower

Mortars

- Saint Étienne 58mm T No.2

== United States of America ==
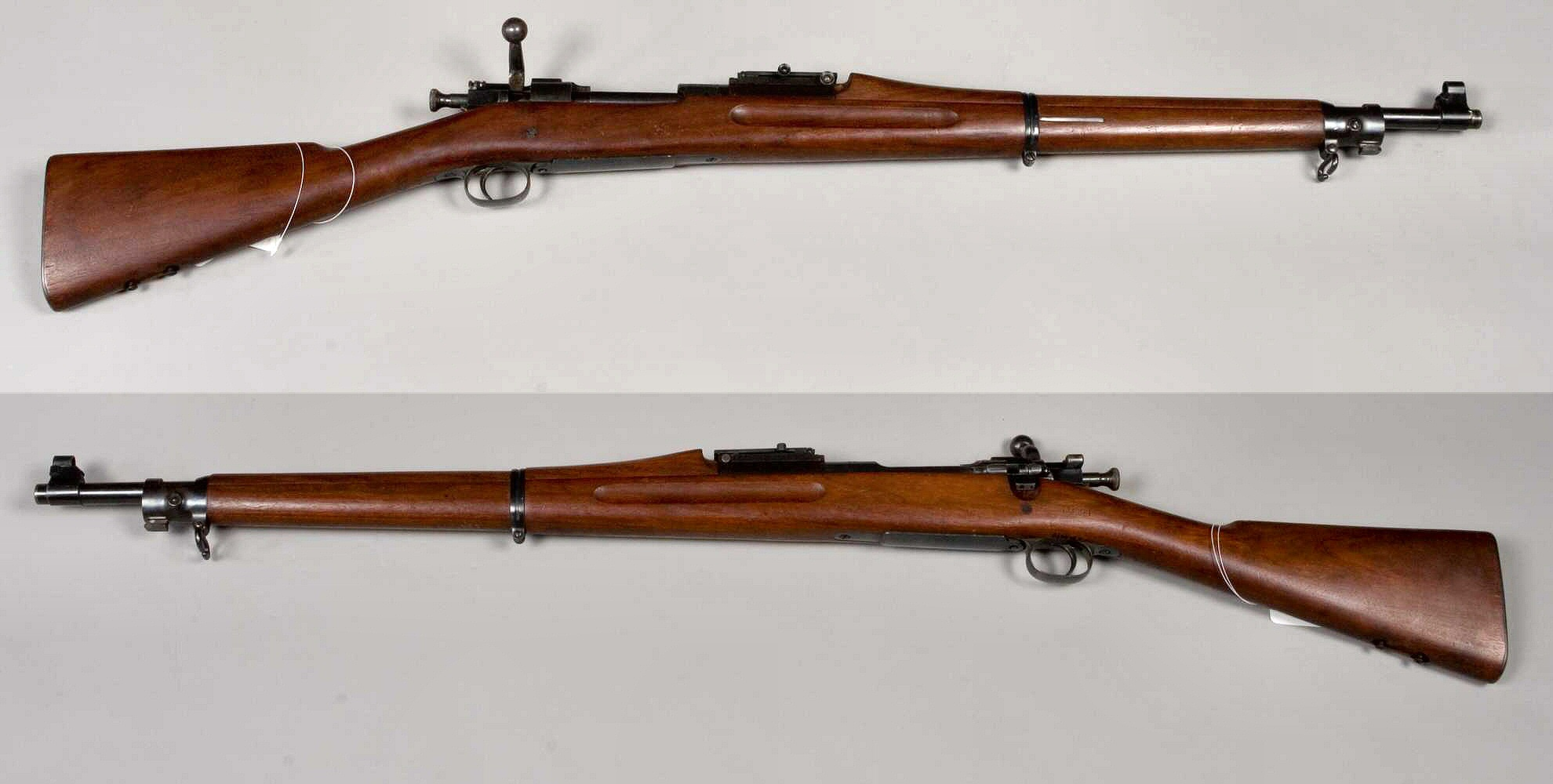
Springfield M1903 rifle

Edged weapons

- Bolo knife
- M1905 bayonet
- M1917 bayonet
- M1917 and M1918 trench knife

Sidearms

- Colt M1873 Single Action Army
- Colt M1889
- Colt M1892
- Colt M1900
- Colt M1903 Pocket Hammerless
- Colt M1905 Marine Corps
- Colt M1909 New Service
- Colt M1911
- Colt M1917
- Savage M1907
- Smith & Wesson M1899
- Smith & Wesson M1917

Shotguns

- Remington M1910-A
- Winchester M1897

Rifles

- Berthier M1907/15
- Lebel M1886/93
- Enfield M1917
- Mosin M1891 (bought left over stock from Remington and Westinghouse, used during North Russia intervention)
- Ross Mk II (20,000 thousand bought from Canada for training purposes)
- Short Magazine Lee Enfield Mk III
- Springfield M1896 and M1898
- Springfield M1903 (Standard issue rifle)
- Springfield model 1873 (Limited use in National Guard units)
- Winchester M1892
- Winchester M1894
- Winchester M1895
- Winchester M1907(Pancho villa expedition)

Machine guns

- Benét–Mercié M1909
- Browning M1917
- Chauchat M1915 and M1918
- Colt–Browning M1895/14, Marlin Rockwell M1917 and M1918
- Colt–Vickers M1915
- Gatling gun
- Hotchkiss M1914
- Lewis M1917
- M1918 Browning Automatic Rifle

Grenades

- F1 M1916
- Mk 1 grenade
- Mk 2 grenade
- Mk 3 grenade
- No.5, No.23 and No.36 (Also known as "Mills")
- Viven-Bessières M1916 rifle grenade

Mortars

- Livens Projector
- Newton 6-inch mortar
- Saint Étienne 58mm T No.2
- Stokes mortar

Support guns

- Puteaux 37mm M1915

== Weapons used in trench raids ==
- Bayonet
- Billhook
- Brass knuckles
- Claymore
- E-tool
- Fascine knife
- French Nail
- French raiding hammer
- Hatchet
- Mace
- Machete
- Pickaxe handle
- Push dagger
- Spade
- Stiletto
- Trench knife
- Trench raiding club
- Bowie knife
- Webley Mk I, Mk II and Mk III
- Trench gun

== Concepts and prototypes ==
Sidearms

- Prilutsky M1914

Submachine guns

- Andrews M1917
- Chauchat-Ribeyrolles M1918 mitraillette pistolet
- Frommer M1917 Stop doppel machinen pistole (Double barrel version)
- Maschinengewehr des Standschützen Hellriegel M1915
- Schwarzlose submachine gun
- Thompson M1917 Persuader
- Thompson M1918 Annihilator
- Revelli Beretta 1918
- Walther M1918 machine pistol

Rifles

- Fiat-Revelli M1916 automatic carbine
- Howell M1915 semi automatic rifle
- Huot M1916 automatic rifle
- Knötgen M1914 automatic rifle
- Lewis M1918 automatic rifle
- Ribeyrolles M1918 automatic carbine
- Cei-Rigotti M1895 automatic rifle
- Springfield-Pedersen M1903 Mark I semi automatic rifle
- Winchester-Burton M1917 automatic rifle
- Rossignol ENT automatic rifle
- Esser-Barrat rifle
- Pattern 1913 Enfield rifle, pre war development abandoned due to war

Machine guns

- Berthier M1908 machine gun (Air cooled version)
- Berthier M1911 machine gun (Water cooled version)
- Caldwell M1915
- Darne M1916 machine gun
- De Knight M1902/17
- DWM Parabellum MG 13 (A combination of water cooled version and air cooled version)
- Fokker-Leimberger M1916 machine gun
- Johnston D1918
- Knötgen M1912 machine gun
- S.I.A. M1918
- Schwarzlose M1905 machine gun

Grenade launchers

- Blanch-Chevallier grenade launcher

Guided explosive weapons

- Aubriot Gabet Land torpedo (Cable guided explosive machine)
- Dayton-Wright-Kettering Bug (Remote controlled explosive plane)
- Hewitt-Sperry Automatic (Remote controlled explosive plane)
- Royal Aircraft Factory Ruston Proctor Aerial Target (Remote controlled explosive plane)
- Crocodile Schneider Torpille Terrestre ('Land Torpedo Crocodile Schneider', limited use in 1916)
- Simms Land torpedo (Cable guided explosive machine)
- Wickersham Land torpedo (Cable guided explosive machine, patent in 1918)

== Bibliography ==
- Ball, Robert W.D. (2011). Mauser Military Rifles of the World. Iola, Wisconsin; New York City, New York: F+W Media, Inc. ISBN 9781440215445.
- Chinn, George M. (1951). The Machine Gun: History, Evolution and Development of Manually Operated, Full Automatic, and Power Driven Aircraft Machine Guns. Vol. 1. Department of the Navy, Bureau of Ordnance.
- Kinard, Jeff. (2004). Pistols: An Illustrated History of Their Impact. Santa Barbara, California: ABC-CLIO. ISBN 1851094709.
- Miller, David. (2003). The Illustrated Directory of 20th Century Guns. Minneapolis, Minnesota: Zenith imprint. ISBN 9780760315606.
- Nicolle, David. (1989). Lawrence and the Arab Revolts. Cumnor Hill, Oxford: Osprey publishing. ISBN 0850458889.
- Walter, John. (2006). The Rifle Story: An Illustrated History from 1756 to the Present Day. Norwalk, Connecticut: MBI Publishing company. ISBN 9781853676901.
- Willbanks, James H. (2004). Machine Guns: An Illustrated History of Their Impact. Santa Barbara, California: ABC-CLIO. ISBN 1851094806.
- Zwoll, Wayne. (2003). Bolt action rifles. Iola, Wisconsin: Krause publications. ISBN 9780873496605.
