= Egg grenade =

Egg grenade may refer to:

- Model 17 grenade, German grenade used in World War I
- Model 39 grenade, German grenade used in World War II

== See also ==
- Hand grenade, a generic term for any small bomb that can be thrown by hand
- RGD-5, post World War II Soviet grenade shaped like an egg
