= 12 cm Minenwerfer M 15 =

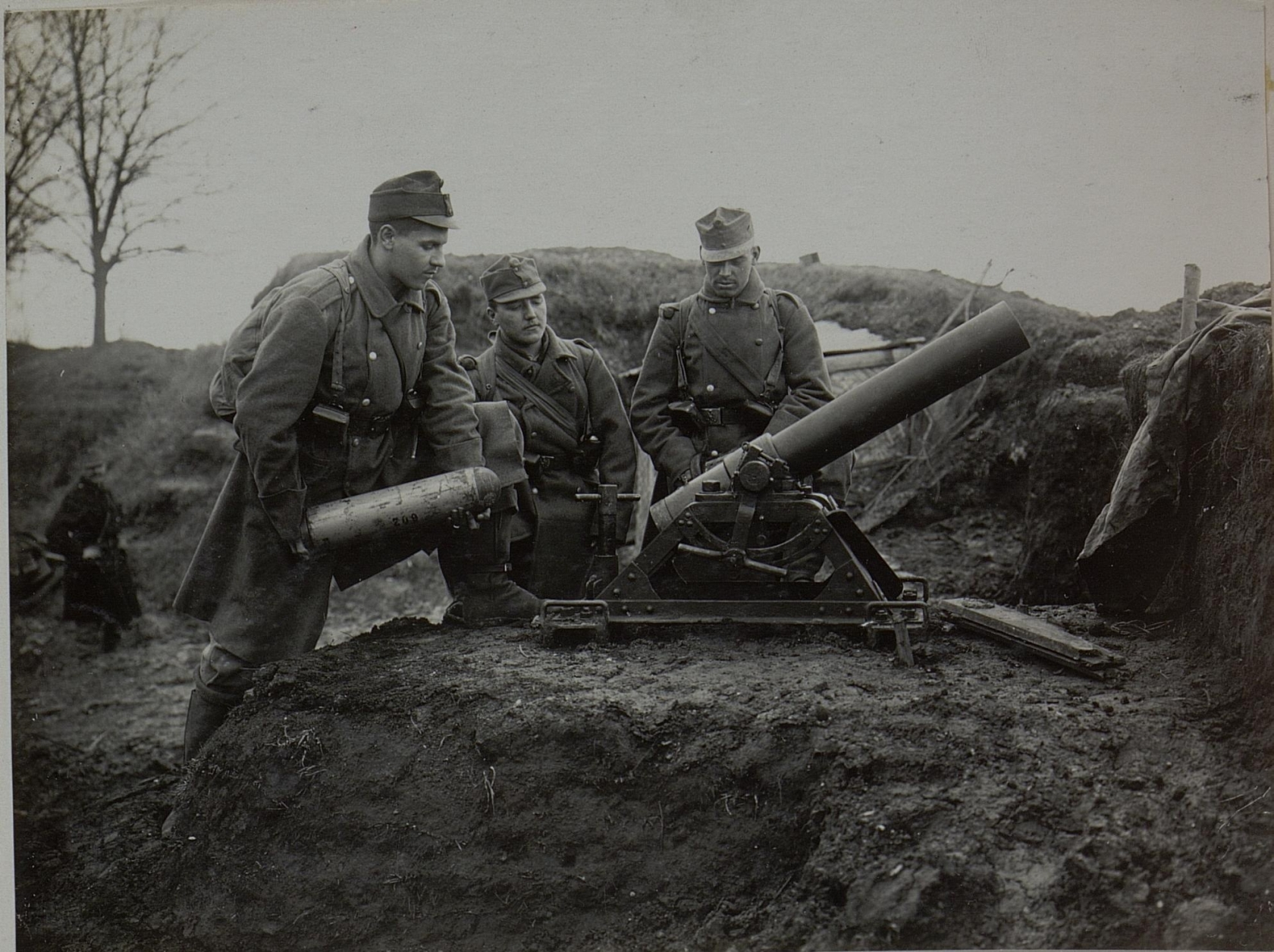
- 12 cm Minenwerfer M 15
- Type: Medium trench mortar
- Place of origin: Austria-Hungary

Service history
- In service: 1915–1918
- Used by: Austria-Hungary
- Wars: World War I

Production history
- Designer: TMK
- Designed: 1915
- Produced: 1916–1917?

Specifications
- Mass: 134.5 kilograms (297 lb)
- Caliber: 120 mm
- Breech: interrupted-screw or cylinder lock
- Maximum firing range: 430 metres (470 yd)

The 12 cm Minenwerfer M 15 (Trench mortar) was a medium mortar used by Austria-Hungary in World War I. It was designed by the Army's own Technisches und Administratives Militär-Komitee (TMK) as an enlarged 9 cm Minenwerfer M 14 in 1915. The War Ministry decided to order 50 from the TMK, but the latter preferred only to produce 10 and switch the remaining 40 to the 14 cm Minenwerfer M 15, but no response was made by the Ministry. The TMZ placed an order for the 10 mortars from Teudloff & Dittrich in Vienna at the end of 1915. A follow on order for another hundred was canceled in February 1916.

== Bibliography ==
- Ortner, M. Christian. The Austro-Hungarian Artillery From 1867 to 1918: Technology, Organization, and Tactics. Vienna, Verlag Militaria, 2007 ISBN 978-3-902526-13-7
