= Mortier de 75 modèle 1915 Schneider =

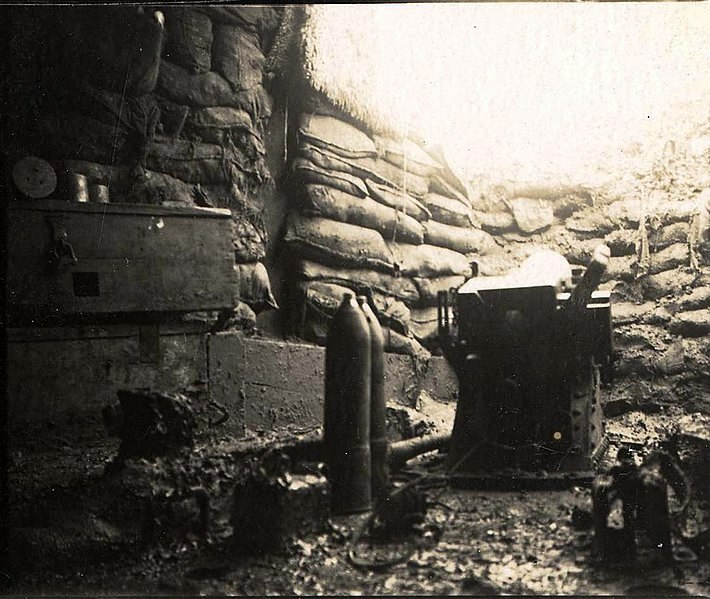
- Type: Light Trench Mortar
- Place of origin: France

Service history
- In service: 1915–1918
- Used by: France; Belgium
- Wars: World War I

Production history
- Designer: Schneider
- Designed: 1915
- Manufacturer: Schneider
- Produced: 1915
- No. built: 900

Specifications
- Mass: 215 kg (474 lb)
- Barrel length: .62 m (2 ft) 5 caliber
- Crew: 5
- Shell: Separate loading cased charge and projectile
- Shell weight: 5.3 kg (12 lb)
- Caliber: 75 mm (3 in)
- Action: Manual
- Breech: Horizontal sliding-block
- Recoil: None
- Carriage: Two wheeled detachable cart.
- Elevation: 0° to +70°
- Traverse: 40°
- Rate of fire: 4 rpm
- Muzzle velocity: 130 m/s (430 ft/s)
- Maximum firing range: 1.7 km (1.1 mi)

The Mortier de 75 modèle 1915 Schneider was a French trench mortar designed and built by Schneider that saw action with the French and Belgian Army during the First World War.

== History ==
The majority of military planners before the First World War were wedded to the concept of fighting an offensive war of rapid maneuver which in a time before mechanization meant a focus on cavalry and light horse artillery firing shrapnel shells at formations of troops in the open. However, the theorists hadn't foreseen that trenches, barbed wire, and machine guns would rob them of the mobility and as the Western Front stagnated into trench warfare the light field guns that the combatants went to war with began to show their limitations when facing an enemy who was now dug into prepared positions.

The problem facing the combatants was that their light field guns were designed for direct fire and only had limited angles of elevation and weren't capable of providing indirect fire or the interdiction fire needed to deal with enemy troops in dug-in positions. The simple expedient was to elevate the guns by having them fire from pits but the weight and size of the guns were excessive for the task at hand since pack animals couldn't move the guns in the trenches or across the quagmire of no man's land.

== Design ==
The Mortier de 75 modèle 1915 was a short-barrelled, breech loaded, rifled mortar with a horizontal sliding-block that fired separate loading cased charges and projectiles. The barrel was of autofretted monoblock construction which was trunnioned while the sliding-block breech bore no relation to the Nordenfelt eccentric screw breech used by the mle 1897. The projectiles came from the ubiquitous Canon de 75 modèle 1897 while the casing was a shortened mle 1897 casing which could hold three propellant charges and be reused up to 50 times.

By varying the number of propellant charges, both the range and angle of impact for the projectile could be controlled. The mortar had no recoil mechanism and the barrel sat on a heavy steel base that absorbed recoil. Due to its low velocity and soft recoil the mle 1915 could use large stocks of defective shells with unstable explosives that were produced during the war. The barrel pivoted at the front of the base and could be traversed by a wooden handle at the rear while levers near the trunnion controlled elevation. For transport, the mortar could be placed on a two-wheeled wooden cart with two wooden handles and pulled by a team of 5 men or it could be broken down into 14 pieces and carried by soldiers to the front line trenches.

Beginning in September of 1915 regiments of the French and Belgian army was equipped with the mle 1915 and it can be considered a rough equivalent of the 7.58 cm Minenwerfer of the German Army. However, it was found that despite being able to provide high-angle fire its light shell was little more effective than if it was fired by the Canon de 75 modèle 1897. The shells lacked the explosive power needed to get at troops in reinforced bunkers and they did not have enough explosive power to destroy trenches. By comparison, a French Mortier de 58 mm type 2 weighed 226 kg (498 lb) and could deliver a projectile that weighed between 18–35 kg (40–77 lb). While the British Stokes mortar could deliver a 4.84 kg (10 lb 11 oz) projectile it had a better rate of fire and only weighed 47.17 kg (100 lb) versus the 215 kg (474 lb) for the mle 1915. For these reasons, the mle 1915 did not last long after the end of World War I.

== Gallery ==
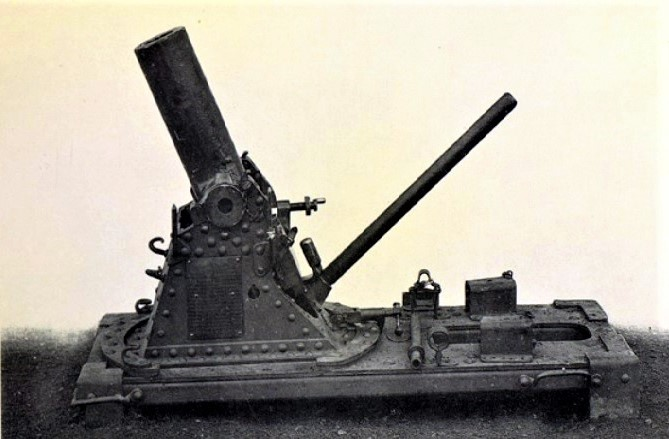
Mortier de 75 Mle 1915 Side View

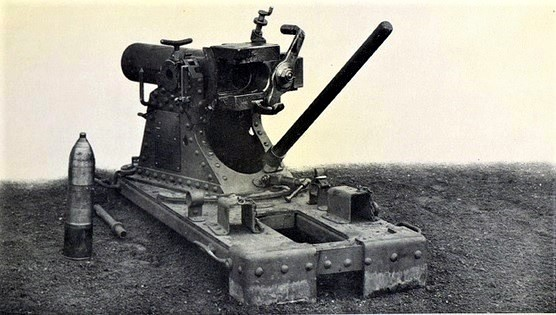
Mortier de 75 Mle 1915 Rear View

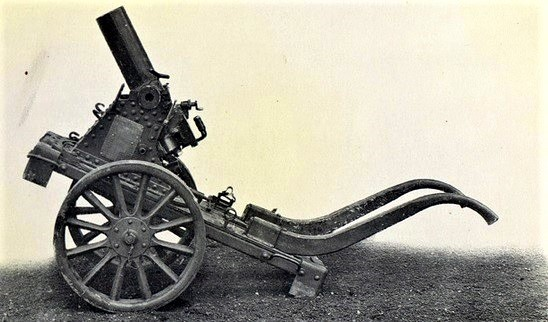
Mortier de 75 Mle 1915 On Cart
