= Hebel Model 1894 =

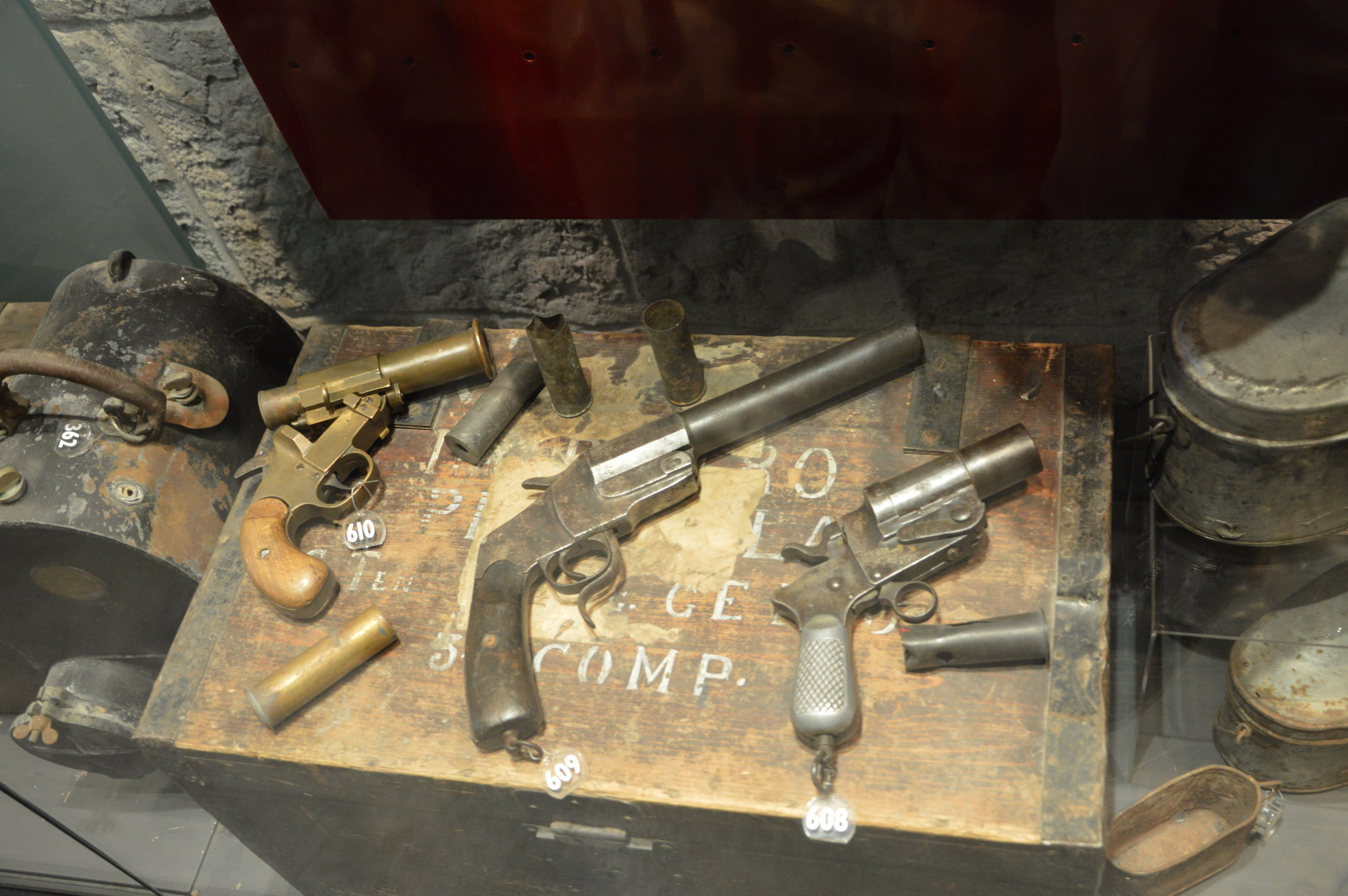
- Hebel flare gun (center)
- Type: Flare gun
- Place of origin: German Empire

Service history
- In service: 1894-1945
- Used by: German Empire; Austria Hungary; Belgium; Nazi Germany
- Wars: World War I World War II

Production history
- Designed: 1893?
- Manufacturer: Greifelt, Fritz Langenhan, J. G. Anschütz and many others
- Produced: 1894-1918
- Variants: Length varied from factory to factory

Specifications
- Mass: 1.8 kg (4.0 lb)
- Length: 36 cm, 23 cm
- Caliber: 26.5 mm (1.04 in)
- Action: Single action
- Feed system: Break action
- Sights: Iron sights

Hebel Leuchtpistole Model 1894 was a flare gun used in both World Wars by Germany and various countries.

The term Hebel (German > "lever") referred to the pistol's lever-action, not the manufacturer. The lever in front of the trigger guard was flipped up and forward to open the breech.
