= Model 17 grenade =

Model 17 Eierhandgranate (M17 egg hand grenade)
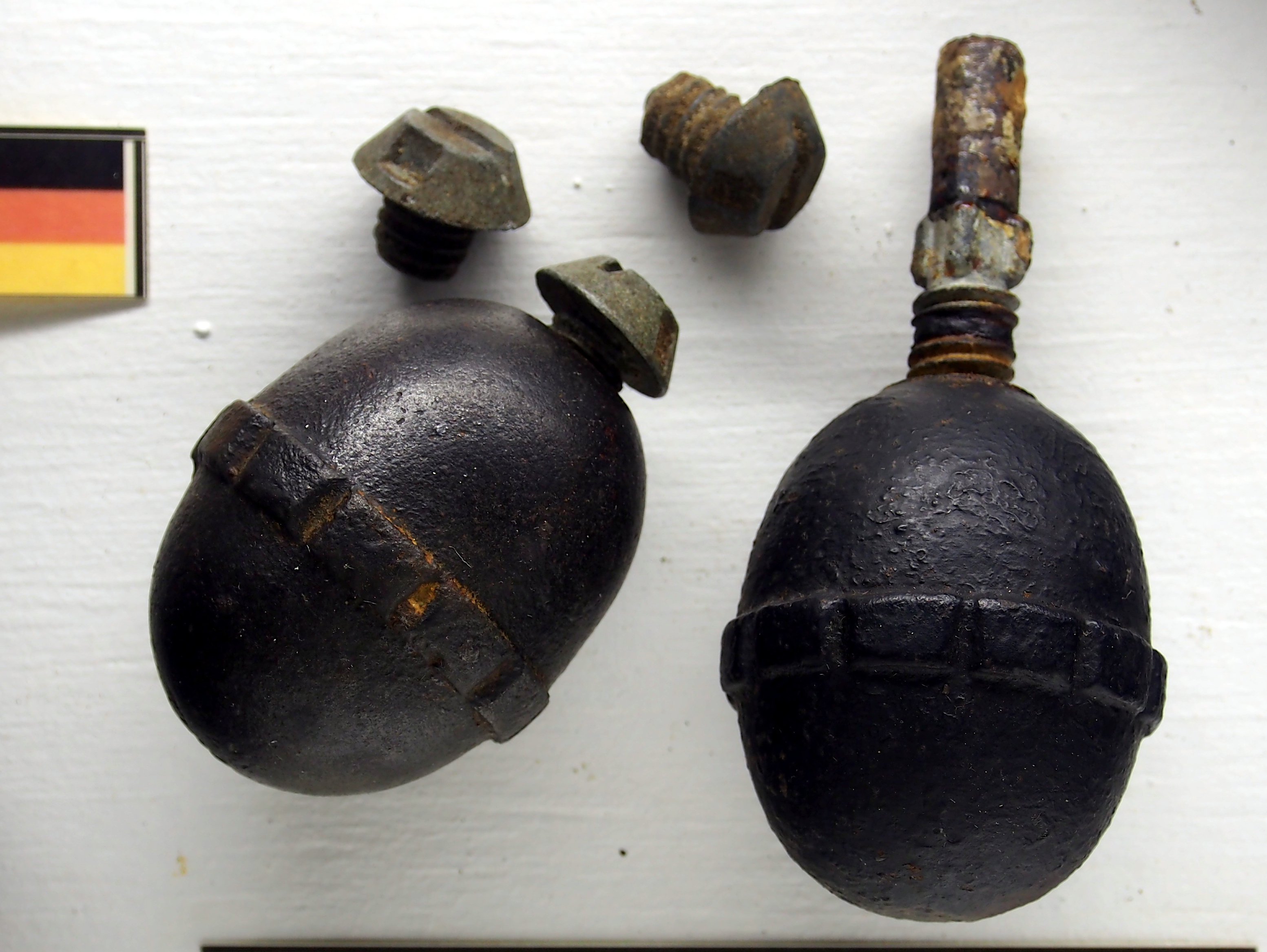
- The left example is fitted with a transportation plug and the right one with an ignition fuse.
- Type: Hand grenade
- Place of origin: German Empire

Service history
- In service: 1916–?
- Wars: World War I

Production history
- Produced: 1916–?

Specifications
- Mass: 318 g (0.701 lb)
- Length: 6 cm (2.4 in)
- Diameter: 4.6 cm (1.8 in)
- Filling: Gun powder, aluminium and barium nitrate mixture
- Filling weight: 32g
- Detonation mechanism: Friction, 5 seconds

The Model 17 Eierhandgranate (German: Model 17 Eierhandgranate, lit. 'Model 17 Egg Hand Grenade') is a small defensive and offensive hand grenade which was used by Germany during World War I.

== Design ==
The Model 17 was more portable than the heavier Kugelhandgranate and less awkward to handle than the stick grenade.

The body of the Model 17 was initially smooth and thus difficult to hold so the design was modified with the addition of a raised band for better grip.

A similar grenade called the Model 39 grenade was later introduced by Germany and used in World War II.

The average soldier could throw a Model 17 40 meters or further.

== Users ==
- Austro-Hungary
- German Empire

== See also ==
- Stielhandgranate
- Kugelhandgranate
- Model 39 grenade
