= VB rifle grenade =

Type of grenade

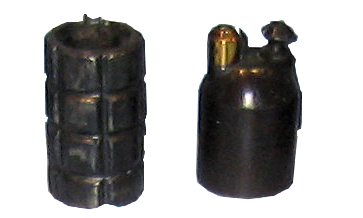
VB grenade on the right

The Viven-Bessières rifle grenade, named after its inventors (Note: Jean Viven, industrialist, et Calix-Gustave Bessières, an engineer graduate of a prestigious arts et métiers, residing in l'Aveyron à Villefranche-de-Rouergue. A number of sources give "Vivien" instead of "Viven".), also known as "VB grenade", and officially referred to as the "Viven-Bessières shell" in the French Army instruction manual, was an infantry weapon in use with the French Army from 1916 onwards.

== Description and characteristics ==
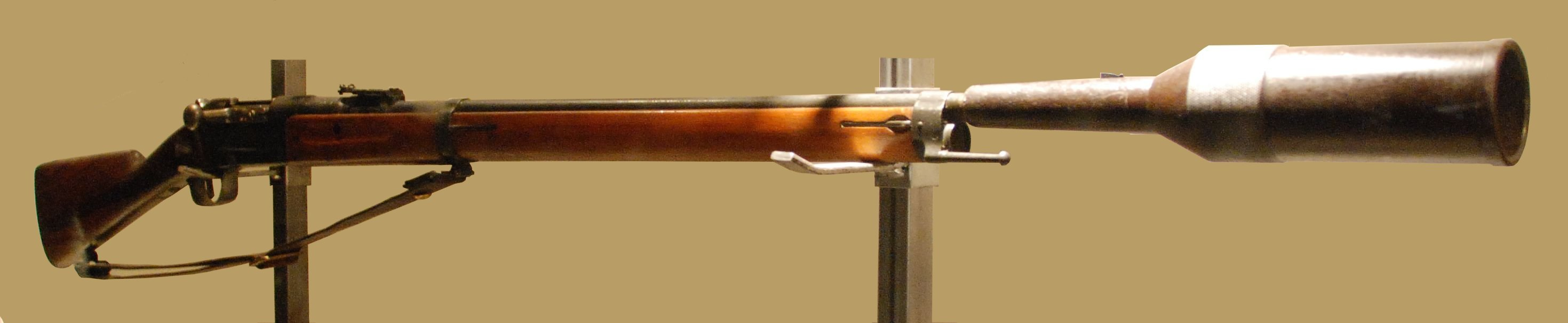
Lebel rifle with VB cup discharger

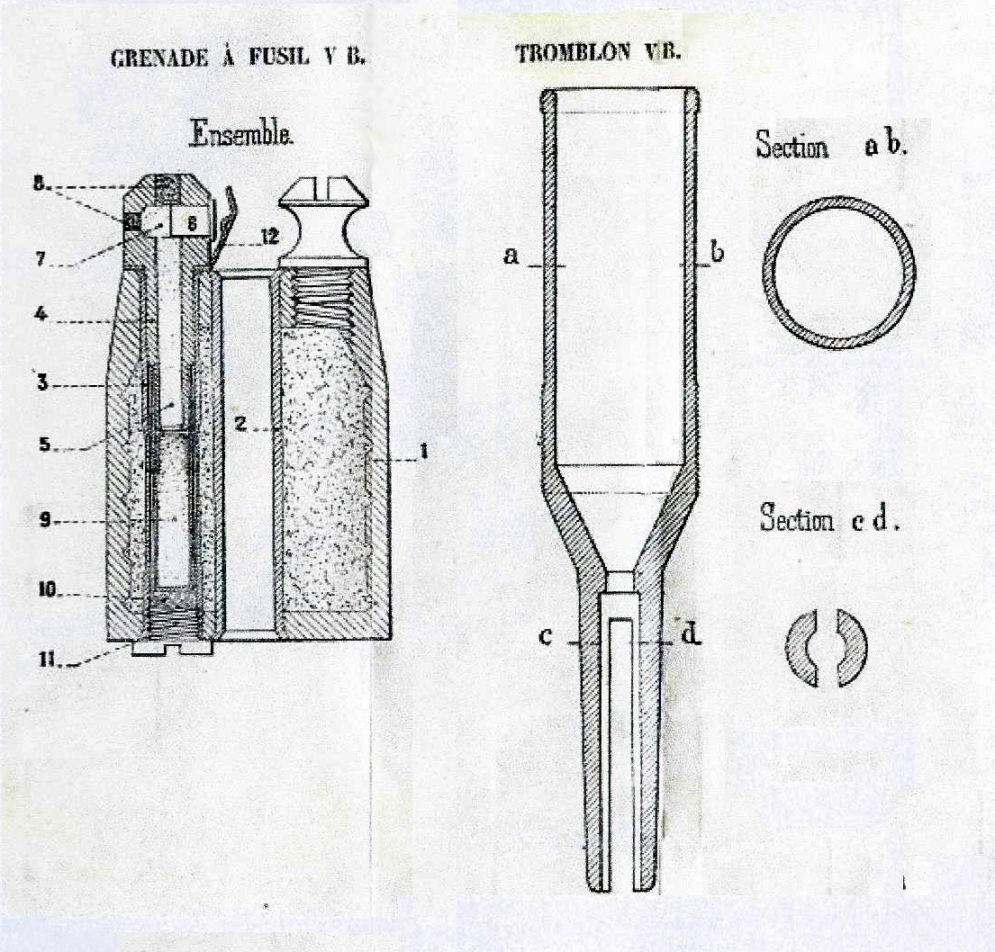
Grenade VB 1916

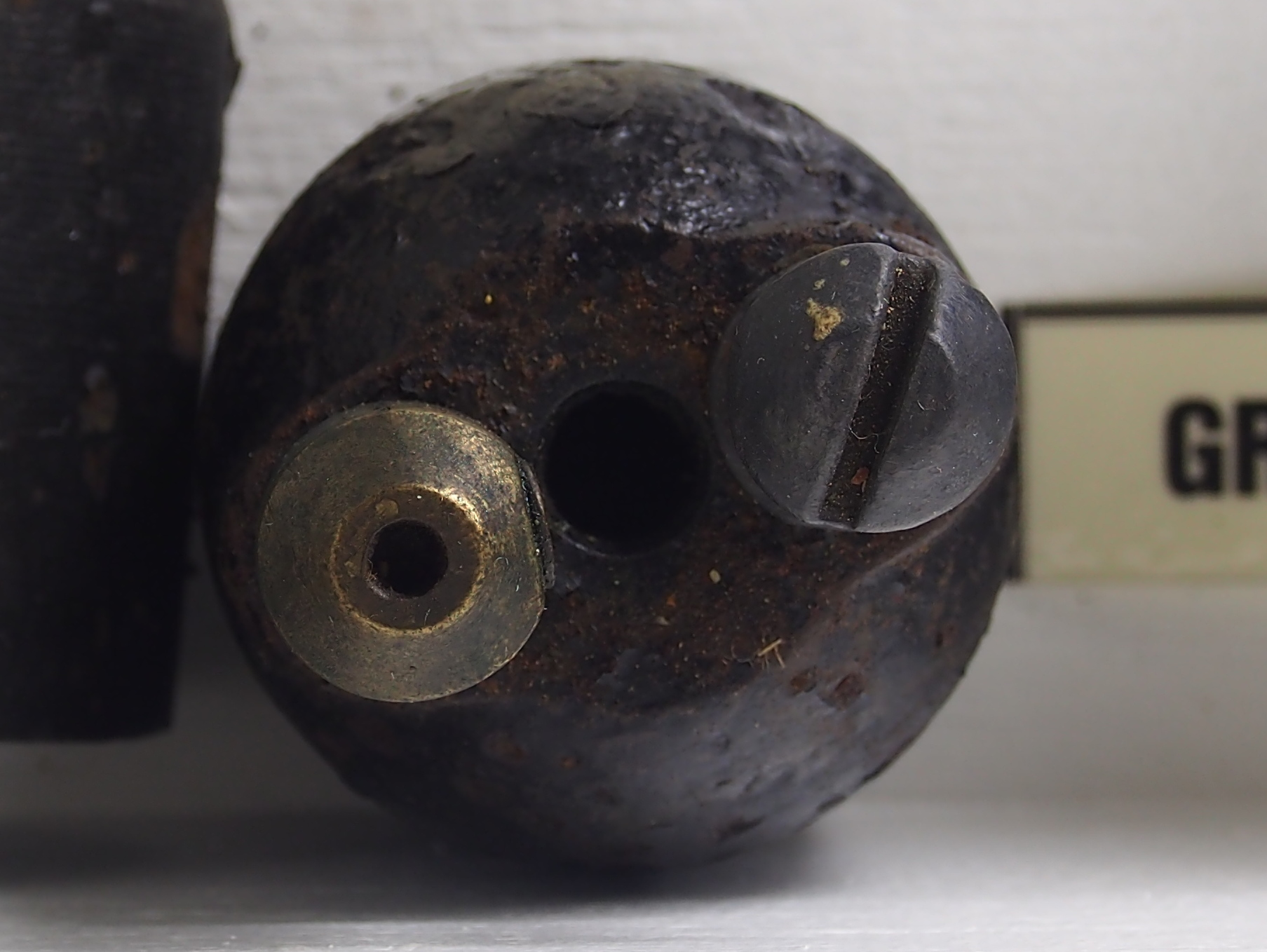
Grenade Viven-Bessières, seen from above

This grenade launcher consists of two elements, the discharger and the projectile.

=== Cup discharger ===
Having a diameter of 50 mm (2.0 in), it weighs about 1.5 kg (3.3 lb). It is fitted on the end of the barrel.

When not in use, it was transported in a leather or canvas case. These cases were made by each regiment.

=== Projectile ===
Cylindrical in shape, it was made of cast iron with internal grooves to facilitate fragmentation during its bursting. Its weight is about 490 g (17 oz) (depending on the version). It contains 60 g (2.1 oz) of cheddite.

It has two internal tubes. The first, central, allows the passage of the ball (bullet) of the cartridge that launches the grenade. The second contains the detonator.

It is launched by firing a normal cartridge, the ball (bullet) passing through the tube at the centre of the projectile. In passing, it causes the fuze to ignite, which will cause it to explode about 8 seconds later. (Note: In reality, it is allowed a tolerance of more or less a second.) The gases generated by the firing of the cartridge are enough to propel the grenade.

There are also Brandt-type projectiles for sending a written message. This projectile emits yellow smoke to improve its recovery. Other versions are smoke or illumination projectiles. These different types of projectiles must be fired with a special blank cartridge, without a bullet.

== Deployment ==
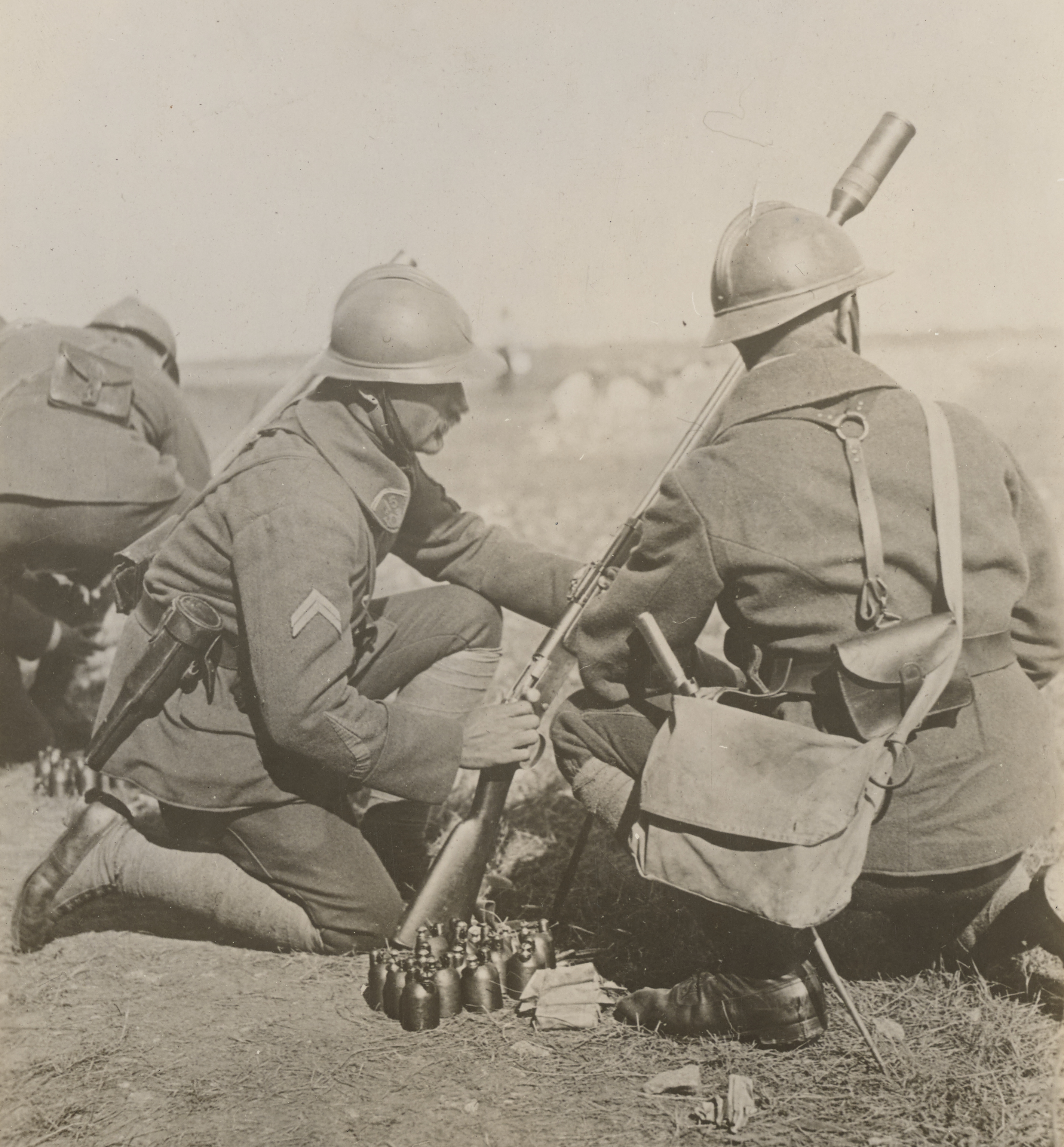
French soldiers demonstrates how to fire the V-B rifle grenades, 1917.

The V-Bs were deployed by rifle grenadiers at infantry company level. Initially, they were eight per company. Their numbers per company increased steadily throughout the conflict.

While it was possible to fire the rifle from the shoulder, the force of the recoil meant that it was better to fire the grenade with the rifle butt placed on the ground. This method also allowed for greater range. Thus, an angle of 80 degrees will give a range of 85 m (93 yd); An angle of 45 degrees will give a range of 190 m (210 yd). To simplify the calculations, a special firing-rack was also provided. The rifles were placed on them, simplifying the range calculations.

== Utilisation ==
=== 1916–1918 ===
According to the contemporary French Army instruction manual, there were two main modes of use of the V-B grenades. "Attrition fire" and "saturation fire".

In the first case, it was a question of aiming at either communications trenches or junctions in the enemy's trench network. One of the examples cited proposed to aim at those communications trenches used by the enemy for lines of resupply, or even the location of the latrines if they could be located.

In the second case, during an assault, it was necessary to saturate an area, in the manner of what the artillery could do. For example, to neutralize machine gun nests; Or, in the defensive, to fire on those communication trenches by which the enemy reinforcements may come.

The US Army also adopted this weapon and implemented it from July 1917. Initially, with material supplied by France; in a second stage, producing their own dischargers and grenades and adapting them to their M1917 Enfield and M1903 Springfield rifles. (Note: They produced about 20 million of these projectiles until the end of the war) The "message" grenade was not used by the Americans.

=== After the end of the First World War ===
The V-B rifle continued to be part of the inventory of the French infantryman at the beginning of the Second World War. The US VB grenade was used at the Battle of Guadalcanal.

After the conflict, the cup discharger concept was gradually abandoned by the army as a means of launching grenades. But it was still in use with the French Gendarmerie until the 1990s to launch tear gas grenades.

== See also ==
- Hales rifle grenade

== Notes and references ==
Notes

== Bibliography ==
- Stephen Bull & Adam Hook, World War I Trench Warfare (1): 1914–16, Osprey Publishing, 2002, 64 pages, ISBN 978-1841761978.
- (in French) Patrice Delhomme, Les grenades françaises de la Grande guerre, Paris, Hégide, 1984, 139 pages, pages 128-129, ISBN 9782904098024.
- (in French) Jean Huon, les armes françaises en 1914-1918, 2005, éditions Crépin-Leblond, 45 pages, ISBN 978-2703002550.
