= Esser-Barrat =

Esser-Barratt
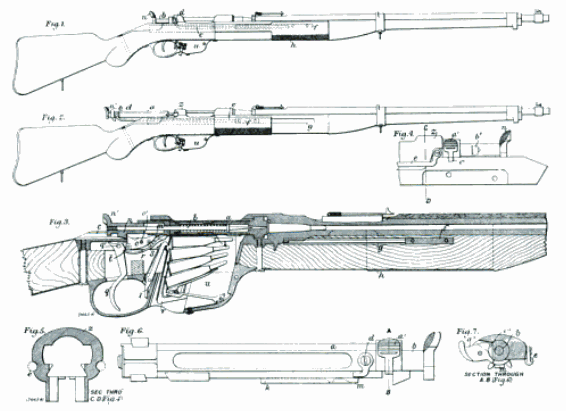
- Technical design of the Esser-Barrat rifle
- Type: Rifle
- Place of origin: United Kingdom

Production history
- Manufacturer: Esser-Barratt Repeating Arms Company Ltd

Specifications
- Mass: 8 lb (3.63 kg)
- Length: 50 in (1,300 mm)
- Barrel length: 30 in (760 mm)
- Cartridge: .303 British
- Barrels: 1; 4 groove rifling
- Action: Experimental straight-pull, pump-action
- Rate of fire: Experimental rifle chambered in .303 British; 5 rounds in 2.5 seconds 40 rounds in 60 seconds
- Feed system: 5 round box Magazine
- Sights: Rear leaf sight graduated to 2,000 yards (1,800 m); Front fixed post

The Esser-Barrat rifle was an experimental slide-action firearm in the United Kingdom at the start of the 20th century. It was essentially a development on the Austrian Steyr-Mannlicher M1895 straight-pull bolt-action rifle, but with the bolt connected to a pump on the for-end of the stock.

The firearm was tested in Bisley Ranges, Bisley, Surrey in 1906, but never adopted for military use.
