= Knötgen automatic rifle =

- Type: Automatic rifle
- Place of origin: German Empire

Production history
- Designer: Matthias Knötgen
- Designed: 1910, 1911

Specifications
- Cartridge: 7.92×57mm
- Caliber: 7.92mm
- Barrels: 2
- Action: Delayed blowback
- Feed system: Detachable box magazine
- Sights: Iron

The Knötgen automatic rifle is a two barrel automatic rifle of German origin. A machine gun derivative also existed as the Knötgen maschinengewehr.

The Knötgen automatic rifle is a two barrel, magazine fed light machine gun using a delayed blowback operation. It uses two bolts and has a spring buffer and cocking lever in the stock.

== See also ==
- List of machine guns
- List of multiple-barrel firearms
