= Beholla pistol =

Beholla Pistol
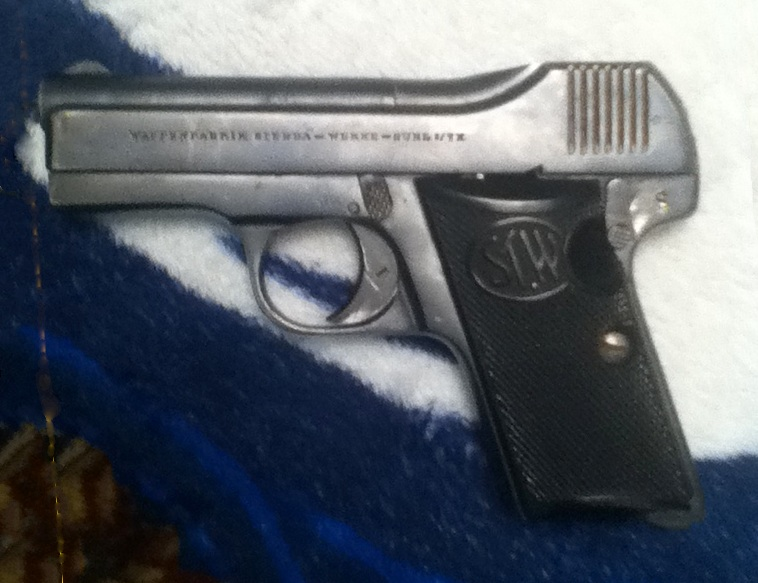
- The Beholla pistol made in 1915 for the German forces in WWI
- Type: Semi-automatic pistol
- Place of origin: German Empire

Service history
- Wars: World War I Lithuanian Wars of Independence; World War II

Production history
- Designer: Becker & Hollander
- Manufacturer: Waffenfabrik August Menz of Suhl
- Produced: 1915–1918
- No. built: 45,000

Specifications
- Mass: 640 g (23 oz)
- Length: 140 mm (5.5 in)
- Barrel length: 75 mm (3.0 in)
- Cartridge: 7.65×17mm (.32 ACP, 7.65 Browning)
- Action: Blowback
- Muzzle velocity: 905 ft/s (276 m/s)
- Feed system: 7-round detachable box magazine
- Sights: iron sights

The Beholla pistol was a German semi-automatic pistol developed by Becker & Hollander.

== History ==
During World War I, it was a secondary military pistol used by the Imperial German Army.

It was manufactured from 1915 until 1918, where, at that point, about 45,000 were produced.

After the Great War, the firm of Waffenfabrik August Menz of Suhl continued to produce the Beholla as the Menta.

From 1921-1932, the company, Franz Stock Maschinenbau und Werkzeugfabrik, manufactured an improved version of the Beholla pistol that saw use by police agencies in Germany and Austria.

== Users ==
- Germany
- Lithuania
  - Approximately 1,353 obtained
    - circa 1919–1920
- Bulgaria
- United States
- Ottoman Empire
- Finland
- Brazil
- Prussia
- Chad
- Mongolia
- Soviet Union
  - Railway guards during World War II
