= No. 6 grenade =

Grenade, Hand No. 6
- Type: Time-fused grenade
- Place of origin: United Kingdom

Service history
- In service: 1915–1917
- Used by: United Kingdom
- Wars: World War I

Production history
- Designer: Royal Laboratories
- Designed: 1915
- Produced: 1915

Specifications
- Mass: 1 lb (0.45 kg)
- Length: 4 in (10 cm)
- Diameter: 2 1/4 in diameter
- Detonation mechanism: Timed friction fuse

The No. 6 Grenade was a hand grenade used by the United Kingdom during World War I.

The No. 6 was a concussion grenade. A variant of it, called the "No. 7", contained shrapnel, making it a primitive fragmentation grenade. Pulling a loop at the top of the grenade ignited the fuse. Once the loop was pulled, the grenade was armed and had to be thrown immediately.

== History ==
The No. 6 was one of the intern grenades, created because of problems associated with the No. 1 grenade. It is one of the few intern grenades that uses a friction-based lighting system. While this seemed fine in theory, in practice it had multiple problems. The most prominent of all was that the arming method did not work as intended. In many cases pulling the loop was too difficult for one man to do and it required two men. For a lone soldier, the best method was to hold the grenade between the knees and pull on the loop with both hands. However, this often resulted in cutting the fingers in addition to igniting the fuse.

Another danger was that the friction igniter was very sensitive, a powerful blow to the grenade with the detonator inserted could set it off. This made the No. 6 almost as dangerous as the percussion cap grenades that it was designed to replace.

At the end of December 1915, the No. 6 and No. 7 were declared obsolete. However, it appears they were still in use up to at least 1917, as grenade manuals made during that time have a section on how to activate and ignite it.

== Variants ==
No. 7

The No. 7 is a variant of the No. 6. Unlike the No. 6, it has an inner and outer casing. The inner casing contained the explosive while the outer contained scrap that was intended to be used as shrapnel. Generally, the No. 6 was used in preference to the No. 7 as it was lighter and there was the possibility of shrapnel from the No. 7 hitting friendly soldiers.
