= M1870 Belgian Comblain =

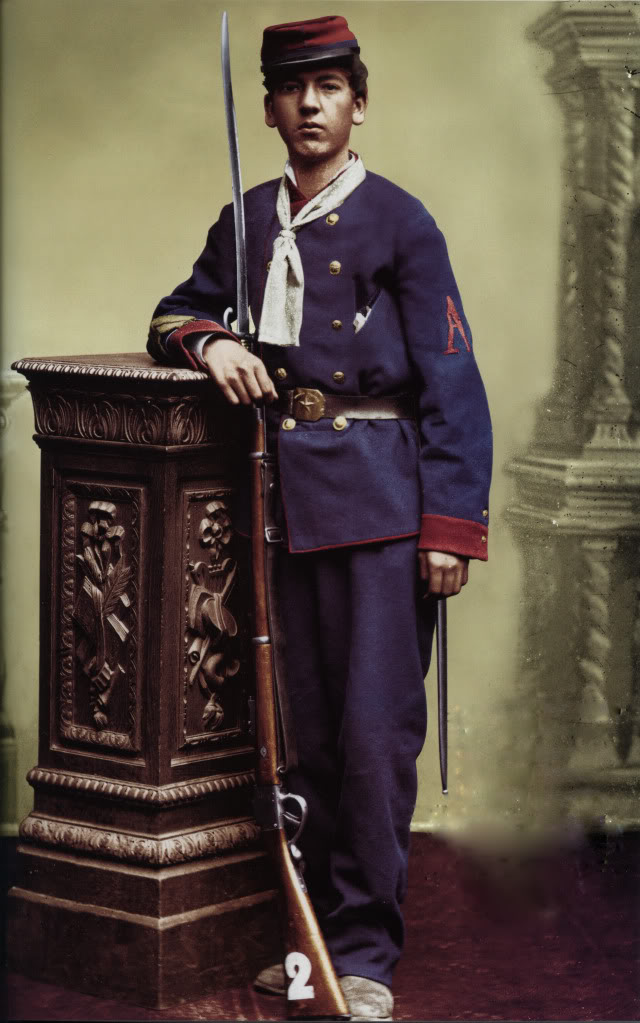
- Chilean soldier during the War of the Pacific and his Comblain
- Type: Service rifle
- Place of origin: Belgium

Service history
- Used by: Belgian, Brazilian and Chilean armies
- Wars: War of the Pacific; Revolta da Armada; Federalist Revolution; War of Canudos; Acre War; Juazeiro Sedition; WWI; German Invasion of Belgium; 1923 Revolution; Rio Grande do Sul Revolt of 1924; Princesa Revolt

Production history
- Designer: Hubert-Joseph Comblain

Specifications
- Mass: 4.3 kg (without bayonet)
- Length: 130 cm (without bayonet)
- Cartridge: 11×50mm R Comblain, 11x54mm (1889 Brazilian contract) 7x57 mm Mauser (Rio de Janeiro Police Carbine)
- Cartridge weight: 40 gr
- Caliber: 11mm
- Action: Falling-block
- Rate of fire: 10 shots/min
- Effective firing range: 300 m
- Maximum firing range: 1300 m
- Sights: Iron

The M1870 Belgian Comblain was a falling-block rifle invented by Hubert-Joseph Comblain of Liège, Belgium and produced in several variants known as the Belgian, Brazilian or Chilean Comblain.

W.W Greener wrote in Modern breechloaders: sporting and military in 1871:

This rifle is called No.2, to distinguish it from the first Comblain, which is a modification of the Snider principle. The Comblain no 2 has the vertical sliding block and guard lever of the Sharp rifle; but the arrangement for exploding the cartridge is different.

The mechanism of the lock is fixed in the breech block, which consists of the ordinary main-spring acting upon a tumbler by a swivel. The tumbler and striker are made in one piece; the scear and trigger are also in one piece . By depressing the lever the breech block is brought down, the cartridge-case extracted and the rifle is cocked. A fresh cartridge being inserted, and the lever returned, the rifle is ready for firing.

The hinge screw can be removed without the aid of a turnscrew, which arrangement allows the breech block and lock to be taken out for the purpose of cleaning.

The breech arrangement is strong and simple. It is used by the Belgian volunteers, and has been severely tested both at Liege and Wimbledon.

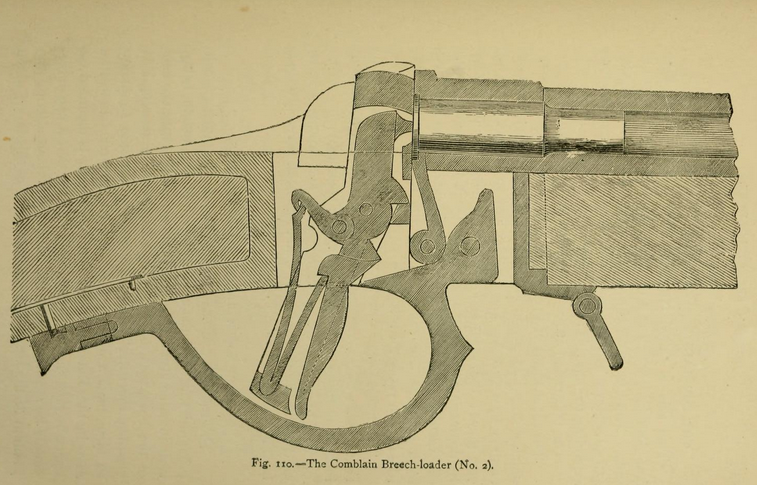
Comblain Breech block

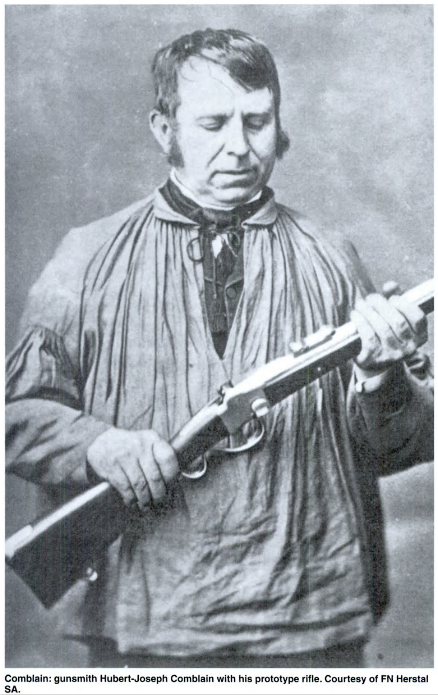
Comblain with his gun

== Users ==
- Belgium: M1882 Belgian Comblain
- Bolivia: Given by Peru during the War of the Pacific
- Empire of Brazil: M1873 Brazilian Comblain and Brazilian Comblain Carbine Model 92
- Congo Free State: Standard rifle of Force Publique
- Chile: M1874 Chilean Comblain
- Morocco: 5,000 M1882 Comblains ordered in 1884
- Persia: Around 1,000 M1881 Comblains from an 1882 contract
- Peru
