= Mauser–Vergueiro =

Mauser–Vergueiro rifle
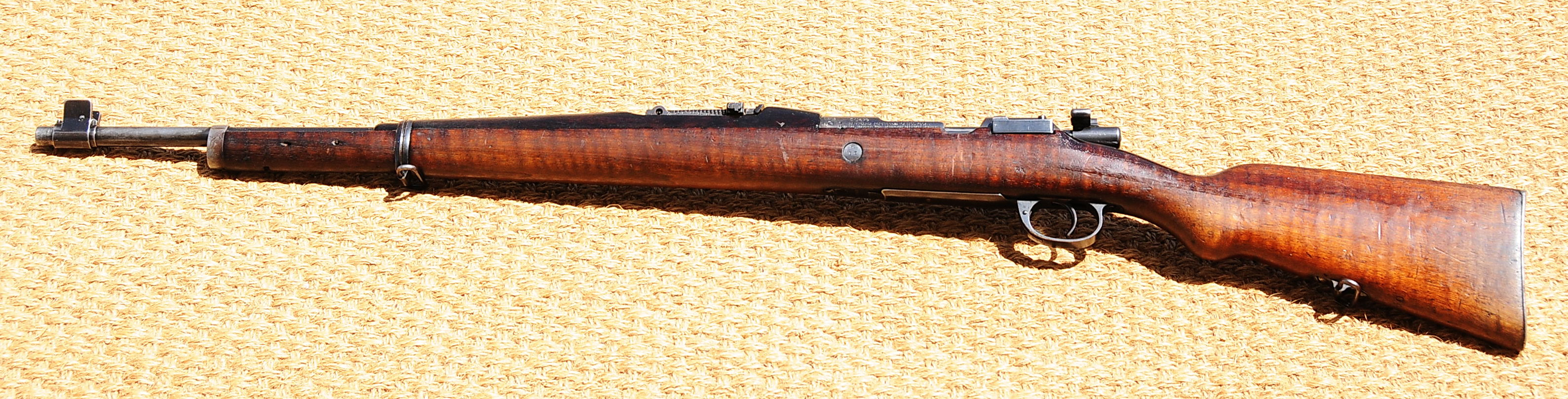
- Mauser–Vergueiro (1904/39)
- Type: Bolt action rifle
- Place of origin: Portugal

Service history
- In service: 1904–1960s (Portugal); 1960s–present (Limited usage)
- Used by: Portugal; Brazil; Union of South Africa; German East Africa; International Brigades
- Wars: Campaigns of Pacification and Occupation; 5 October 1910 revolution World War I Spanish Civil War; Battle of Timor; Portuguese Colonial War; Northern Mali conflict

Production history
- Designer: José Alberto Vergueiro
- Designed: 1904
- Manufacturer: Fábrica de Braço de Prata
- Produced: 1904–1945
- No. built: +100,000
- Variants: Rifle m/1904, Carbine m/1904 and Rifle m/1904-39

Specifications
- Mass: 3.92 kg (8.6 lb) (m/1904); 3.77 kg (8.3 lb) (m/1904-39)
- Length: 1,225 mm (48.2 in) (m/1904); 1,100 mm (43 in) (m/1904-39)
- Barrel length: 735 mm (28.9 in) (m/1904); 613 mm (24.1 in) (m/1904-39)
- Cartridge: 6.5×58mm Vergueiro (Rifle m/1904 and Carbine m/1904); 7×57mm Mauser (Rifle m/1904, export model); 8×57mm IS (Rifle m/1904-39)
- Action: Bolt action
- Muzzle velocity: 715 m/s (2,350 ft/s)
- Maximum firing range: 2,000 m (2,187 yd)
- Feed system: 5-round stripper clip, internal box magazine
- Sights: Iron sights (tangent leaf rear sight adjustable from 200 to 2,000 meters)

The Mauser–Vergueiro is a bolt-action rifle, designed in 1904 by José Alberto Vergueiro, an infantry officer of the Portuguese Army, and manufactured by Deutsche Waffen und Munitionsfabriken (DWM). It was developed from the Mauser 98 rifle with the introduction of a new bolt system derived from the Gewehr 1888 and Mannlicher–Schönauer. Outside Portugal, the weapon was also known as the Portuguese Mauser. It used the 6.5×58mm Vergueiro, a cartridge developed specially for it.

The weapon replaced the Kropatschek m/1886 as the standard infantry rifle of the Portuguese Army in 1904, remaining in service until it was replaced by the Mauser 98k in 1939. In Portuguese service the weapon was officially designated Espingarda 6,5 mm m/1904 ("Rifle 6.5mm m/1904"). A lighter and shorter version of the weapon was classified as a carbine and designated Carabina 6,5 mm m/1904 ("Carbine 6.5mm m/1904"). A total of 100,000 rifles were produced for Portugal. An additional 5,000 Mauser–Vergueiro rifles, chambered in 7×57mm Mauser, were produced in 1906 for Brazil's Federal Police, using leftover components from the Portuguese order and issued in the cities of Rio de Janeiro and São Paulo. In 1915, 20,000 of Portugal's Mauser–Vergueiro rifles were sold to South Africa, which had insufficient Lee–Enfield SMLE rifles to supply all of its troops.

In Portuguese and South African service it was used in combat in the First World War and in several colonial campaigns. The German colonial troops in East Africa also used Mauser–Vergueiro rifles, captured from the allied forces in combat. The Portuguese Expeditionary Corps on the Western Front used British weapons and equipment for logistical reasons, and so did not use the Vergueiro. Although Portugal was neutral in World War II, in 1942 Portuguese forces briefly fought against the Japanese occupation of Portuguese Timor using Kropatschek rifles

In 1939, after the Portuguese Army had adopted the 7.92×57mm Mauser 98k as the m/937, many of the remaining Mauser–Vergueiro rifles were modified to chamber the new standard cartridge. The modified rifles were called Espingarda 8 mm m/1904-39. Markings on the modified rifles remained unchanged with the exception of the caliber designation "6,5" being stamped over on some rifles with two "X" marks. This was apparently done by individual Portuguese armorers rather than as standard practice. The 8mm variant can be distinguished visually from the 6.5mm variant with the 1939 modifications including a shorter barrel, distinctive front sight protector and ground down rear sight base.

The 7.92×57mm Mauser–Vergueiro rifle was kept in limited use in the Portuguese Army until the middle 1960s, mainly in some Overseas units.

These rifles are still used in Africa, for example in the Northern Mali conflict.

== Notes ==
- http://www.cptpp.com/fotos/2011/Mauser-Vergueiro-october-2011-TargetShooter-magazine-online.pdf

== Gallery ==
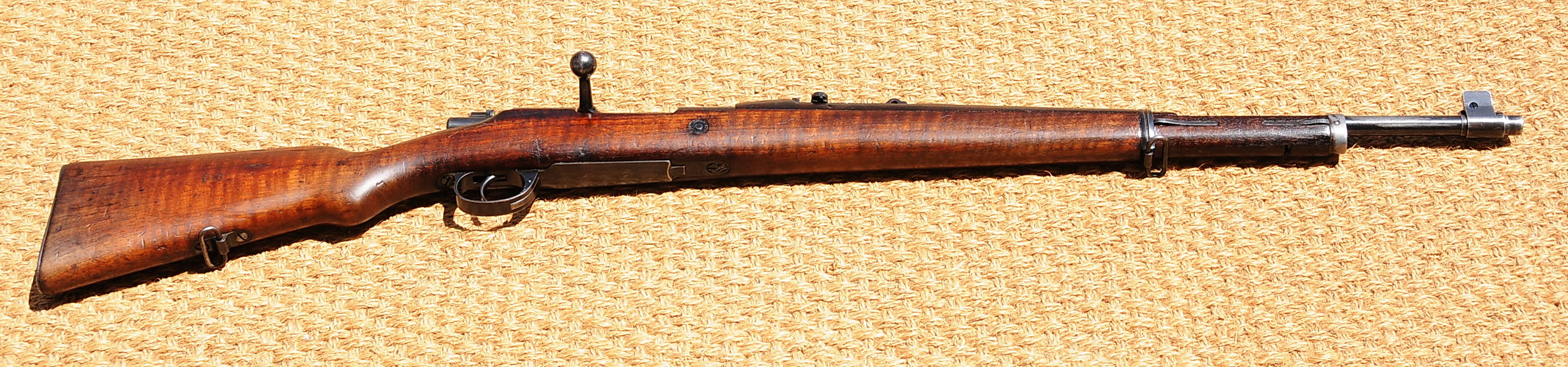
Overall view - right side

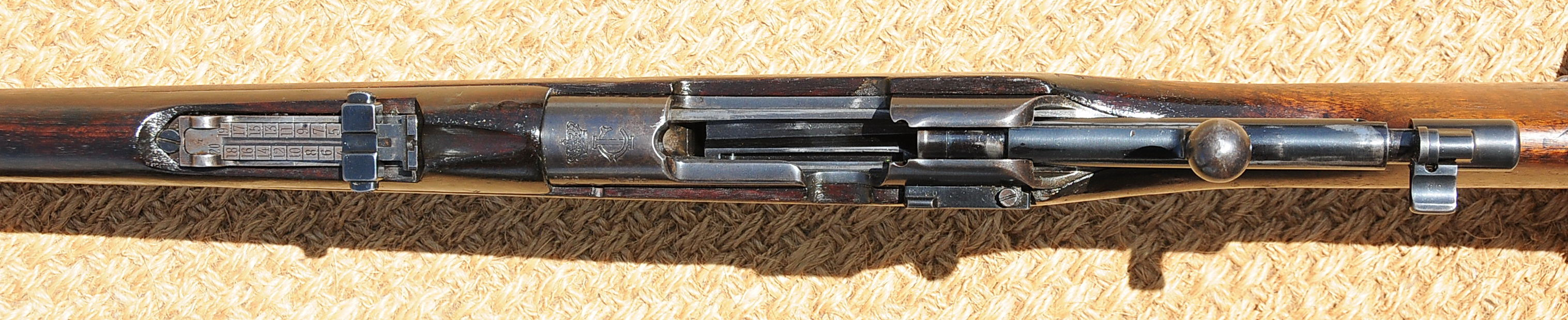
Top view - bolt, action, sight elevation ruler

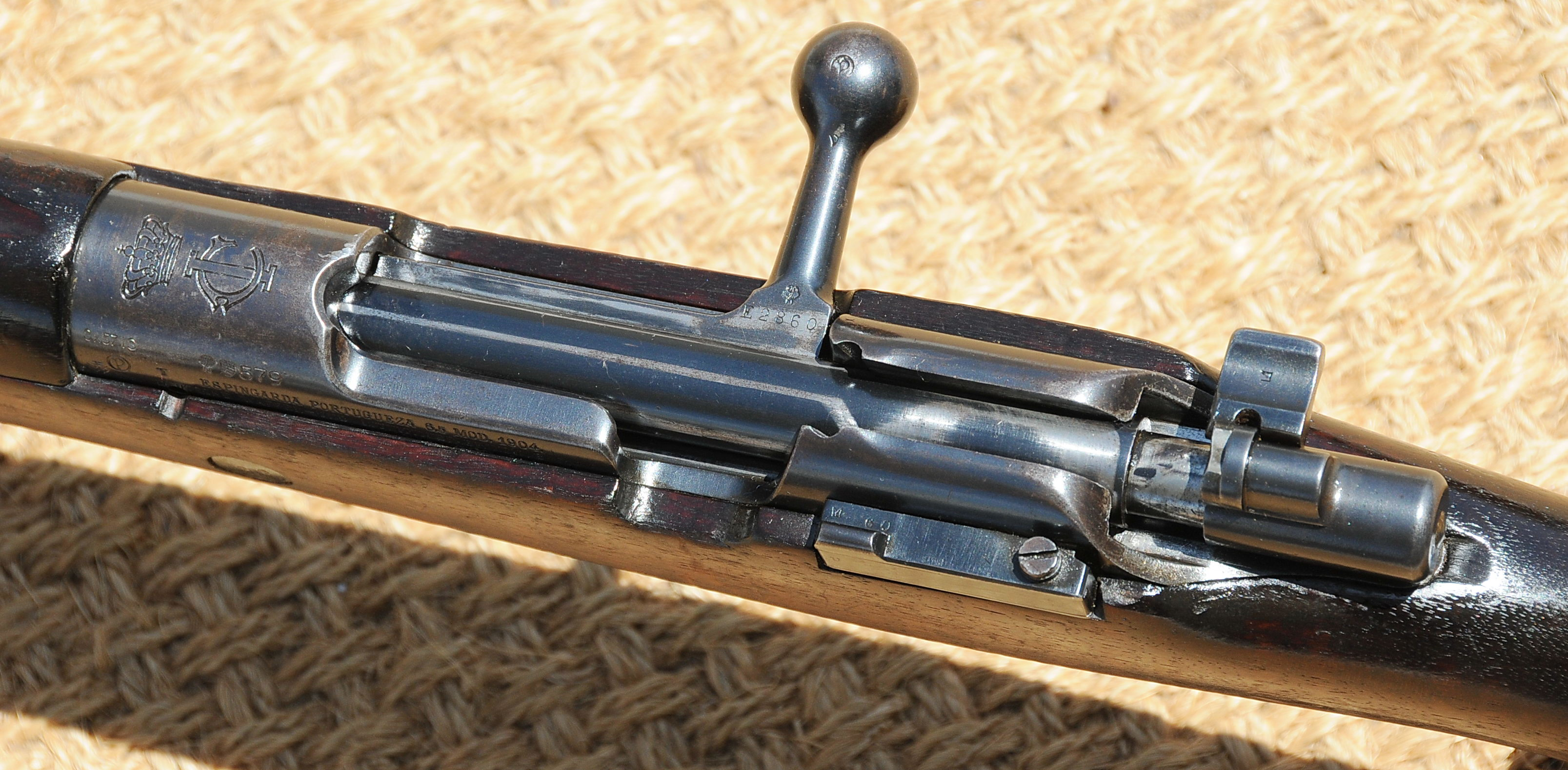
Action

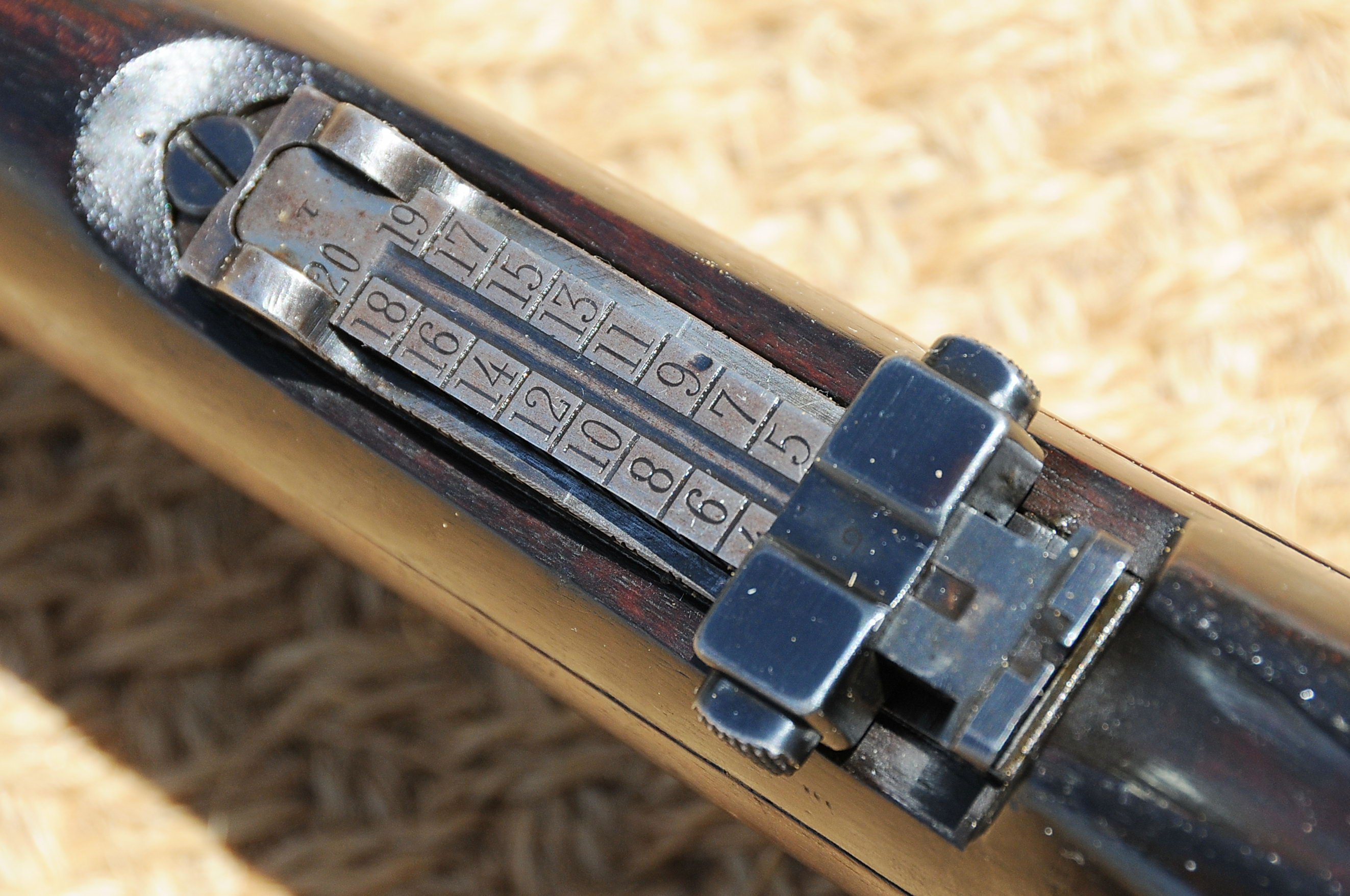
The finger adjustable elevation sight ruler (note ground down sight base)

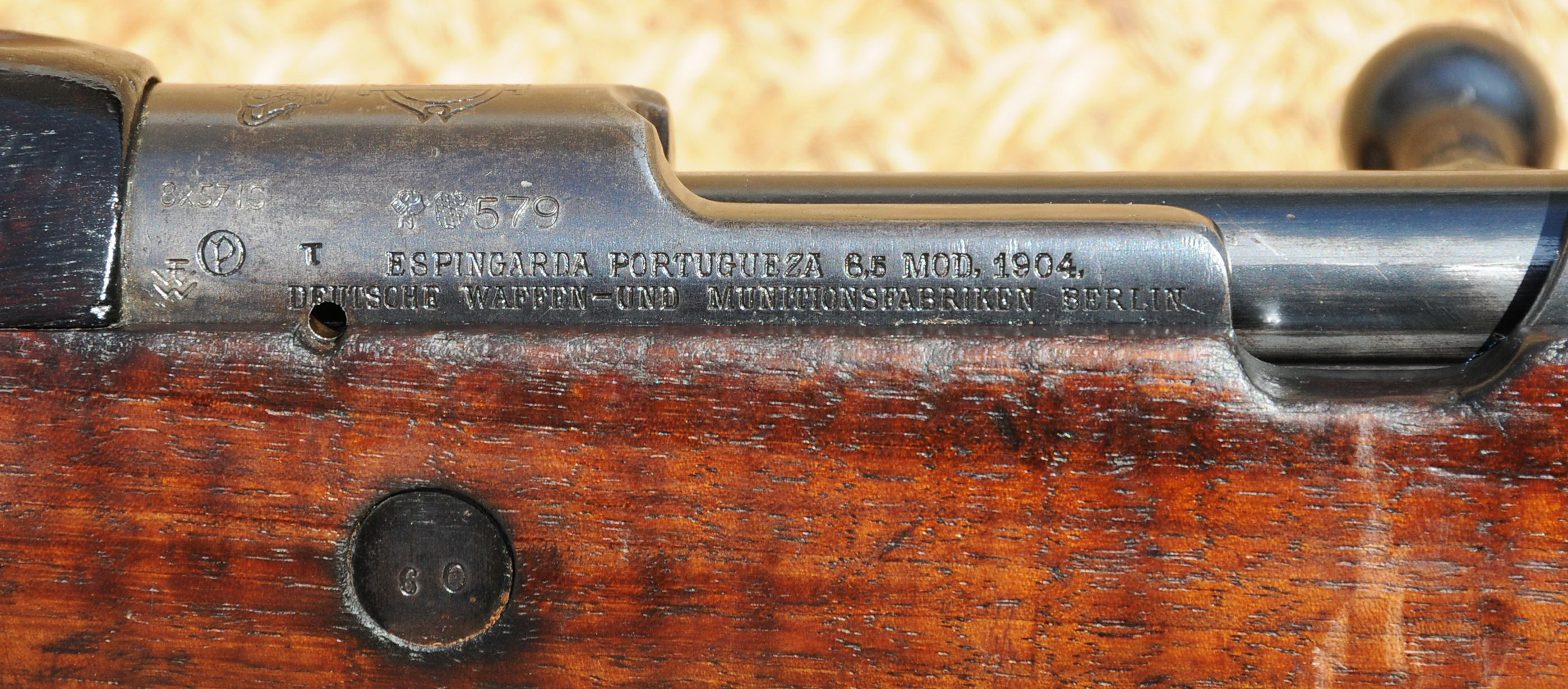
Side markings: "Espingarda Portugueza 6,5 mod. 1904". "Deutsche Waffen - und Munitionsfabriken . BERLIN". (note 6.5mm not stamped out despite being 8mm)

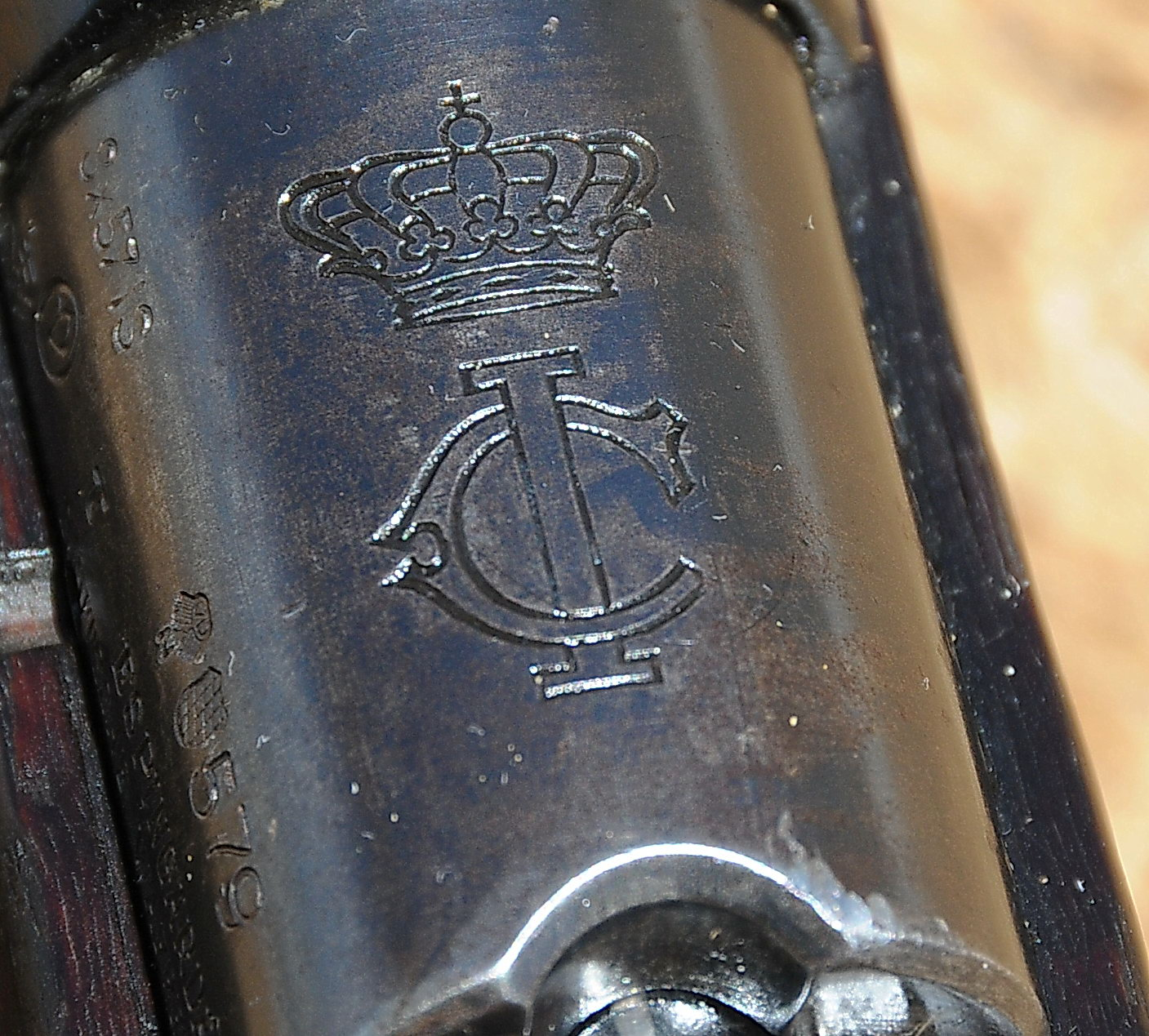
D. Carlos I royal sign top marking

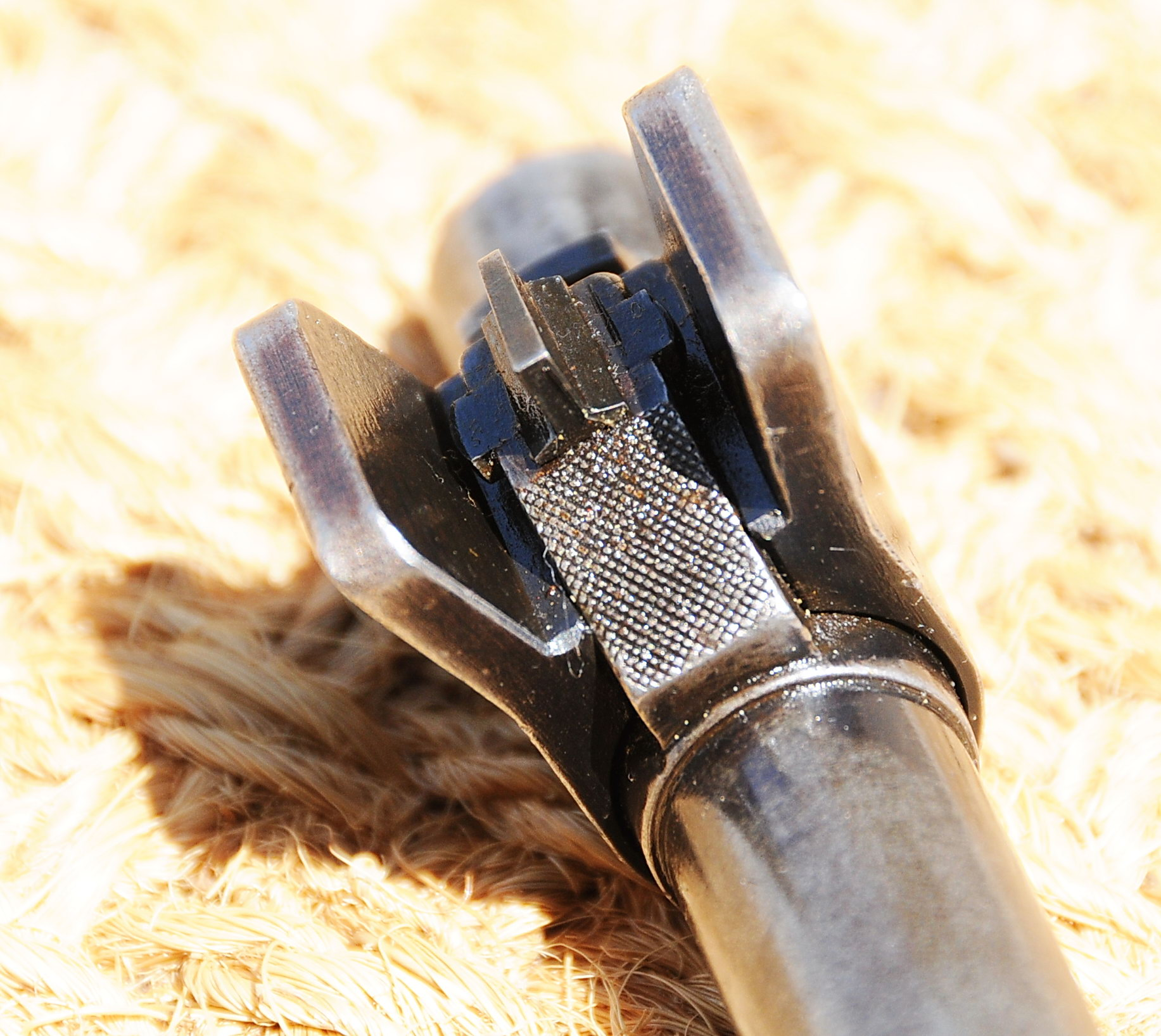
Front sight with side protection guards (Front sight protector is only on the 1904/39 update)

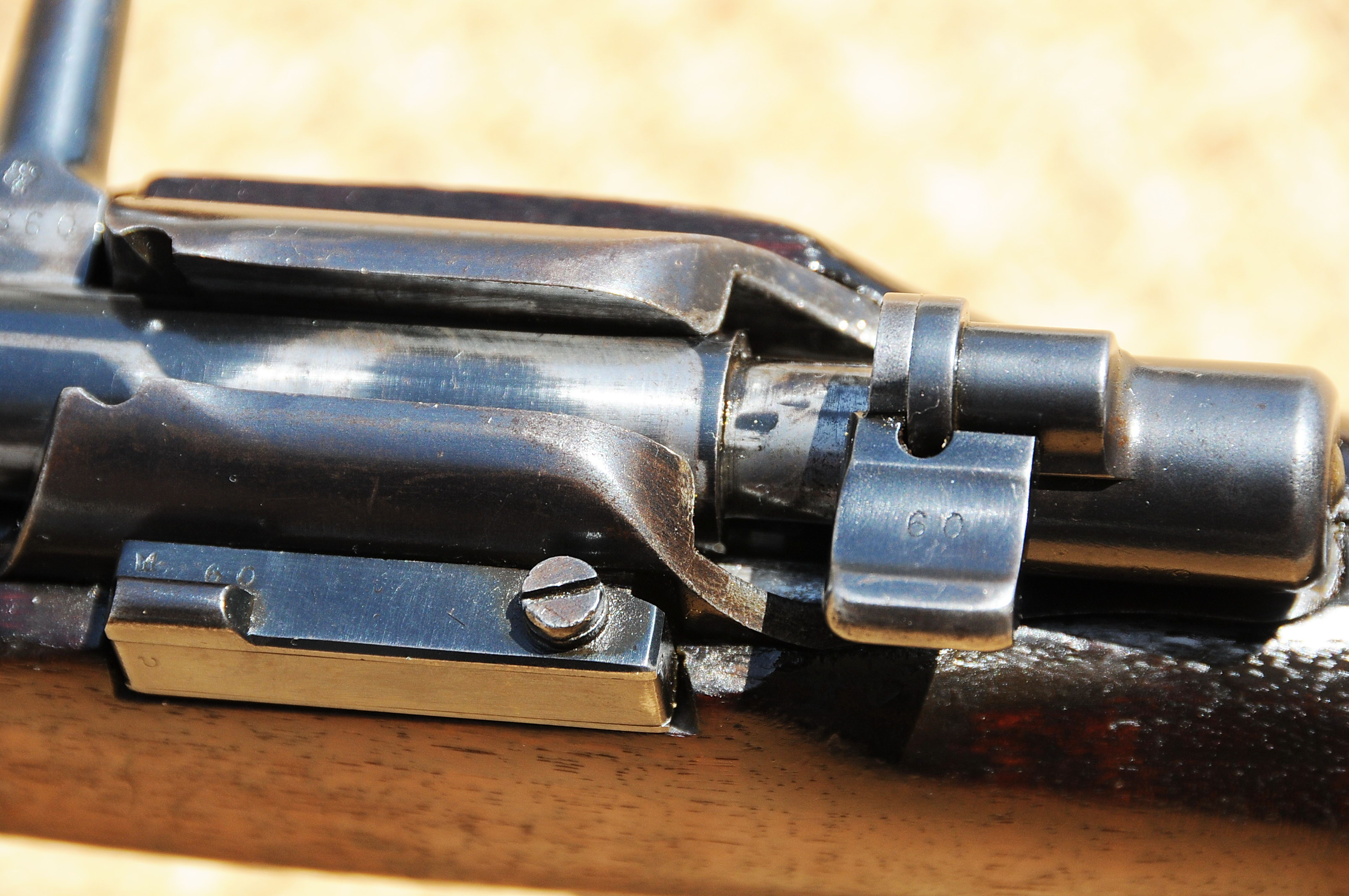
Mannlicher style Bolt and split receiver bridge

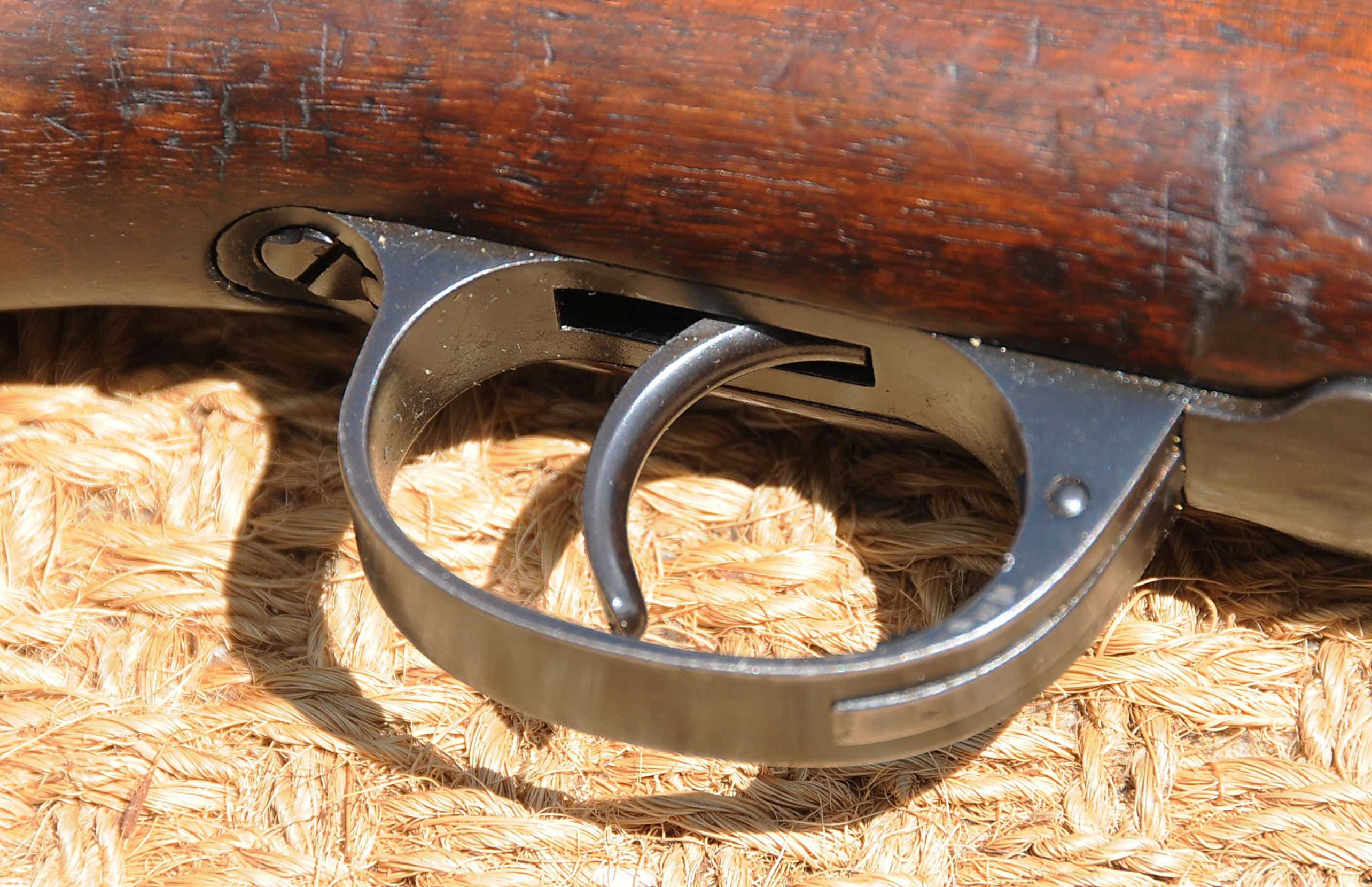
Trigger (with magazine release)
