= Kugelhandgranate =

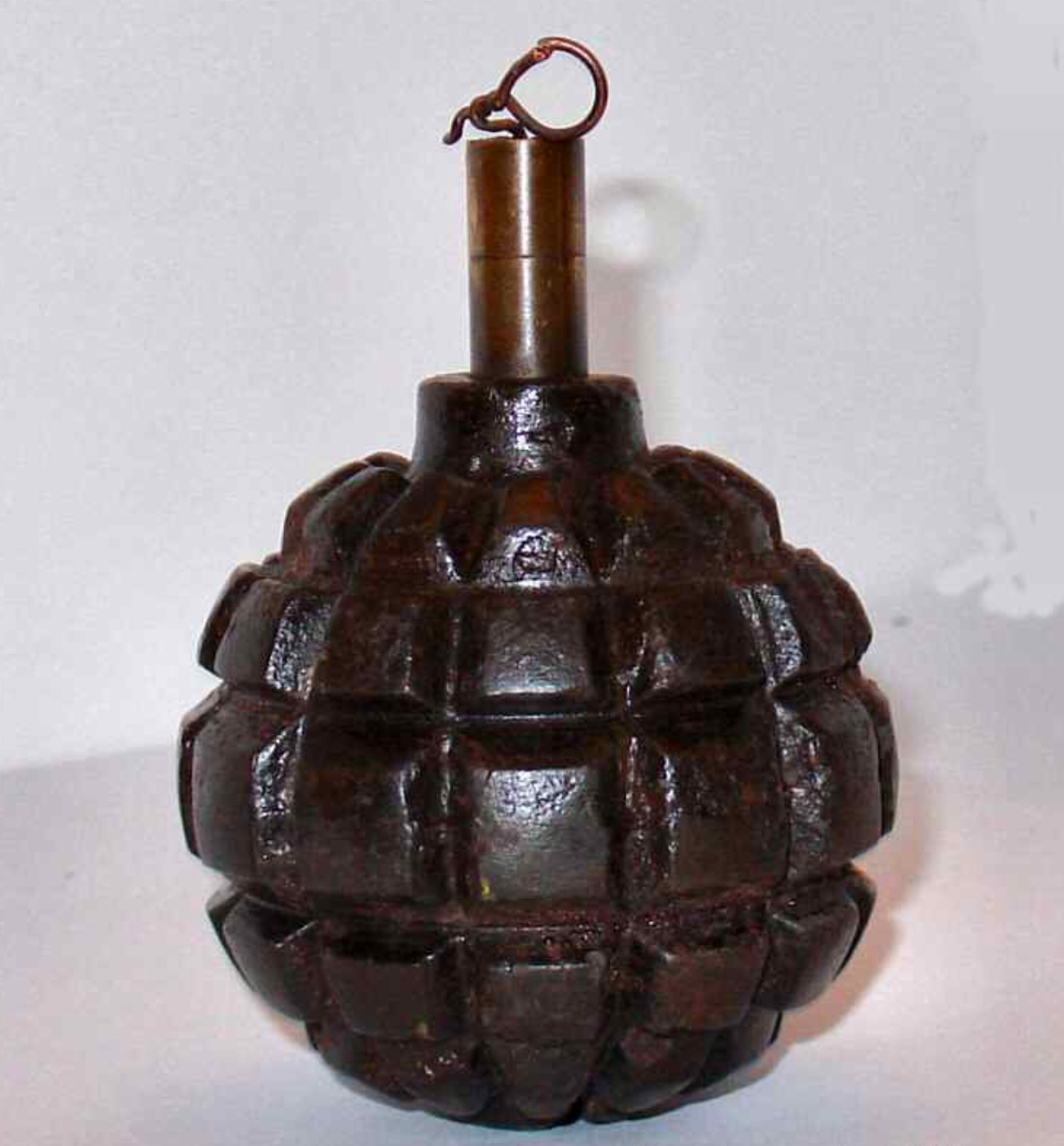
- Type: Fragmentation hand grenade
- Place of origin: German Empire

Service history
- Wars: World War I

Specifications
- Mass: 1 kg (2.2 lb)
- Diameter: 80 mm (3.1 in)
- Effective firing range: 20 m (66 ft)
- Filling: Mixture of black powder, barium nitrate, and potassium perchlorate
- Filling weight: 45 g (1.6 oz)
- Detonation mechanism: Friction wire & delayed fuse

The Kugelhandgranate (lit. 'Ball hand grenade') is a model of hand-thrown fragmentation grenade manufactured in Germany, also known as Mod. 1913.

== Description ==
The body of the grenade was cast iron 8 mm (0.31 in) thick, spherical and externally segmented, designed to produce between 70 and 80 fragments.

A bronze-like stick (which was the igniter) was introduced to the spherical body.

The filling was a mixture of black powder, barium nitrate, and potassium perchlorate, and did not require a detonator.

The friction igniter consisted of a bronze body with a central chamber filled with black powder and supplied with a 5 or 7 second delay, the powder train was topped with a priming wire made of brass with a loop at one end and serrated on the other.

The serrated portion was coated with a mixture of ground glass, manganese dioxide, and potassium chlorate.

== Method of use ==
To be used, the friction wire had to be pulled from the igniter, starting the delay train at the last possible moment.

To do this, a piece of leather was attached to the igniter with a snap hook; pulling this removed the wire so the grenade could be thrown.

A man with average strength could throw this grenade about 15 m (49 ft).

== Variants ==
=== M1915 Kugelhandgranate NA ===
By 1915, German industry was preparing for a long war and resources were already becoming stretched, making it beneficial from both an economic and manufacturing point of view to design a replacement for the Kugelhandgranate Mod. 1913.

The Kugelhandgranate Mod. 1915 (which was considerably easier to produce) was thus introduced and used from 1915 onward.

== Former users ==
- German Empire

== See also ==
- Mills bomb
- Stielhandgranate
- Eihandgranate
- F1 grenade (France)
