= 14 cm Minenwerfer M 15 =

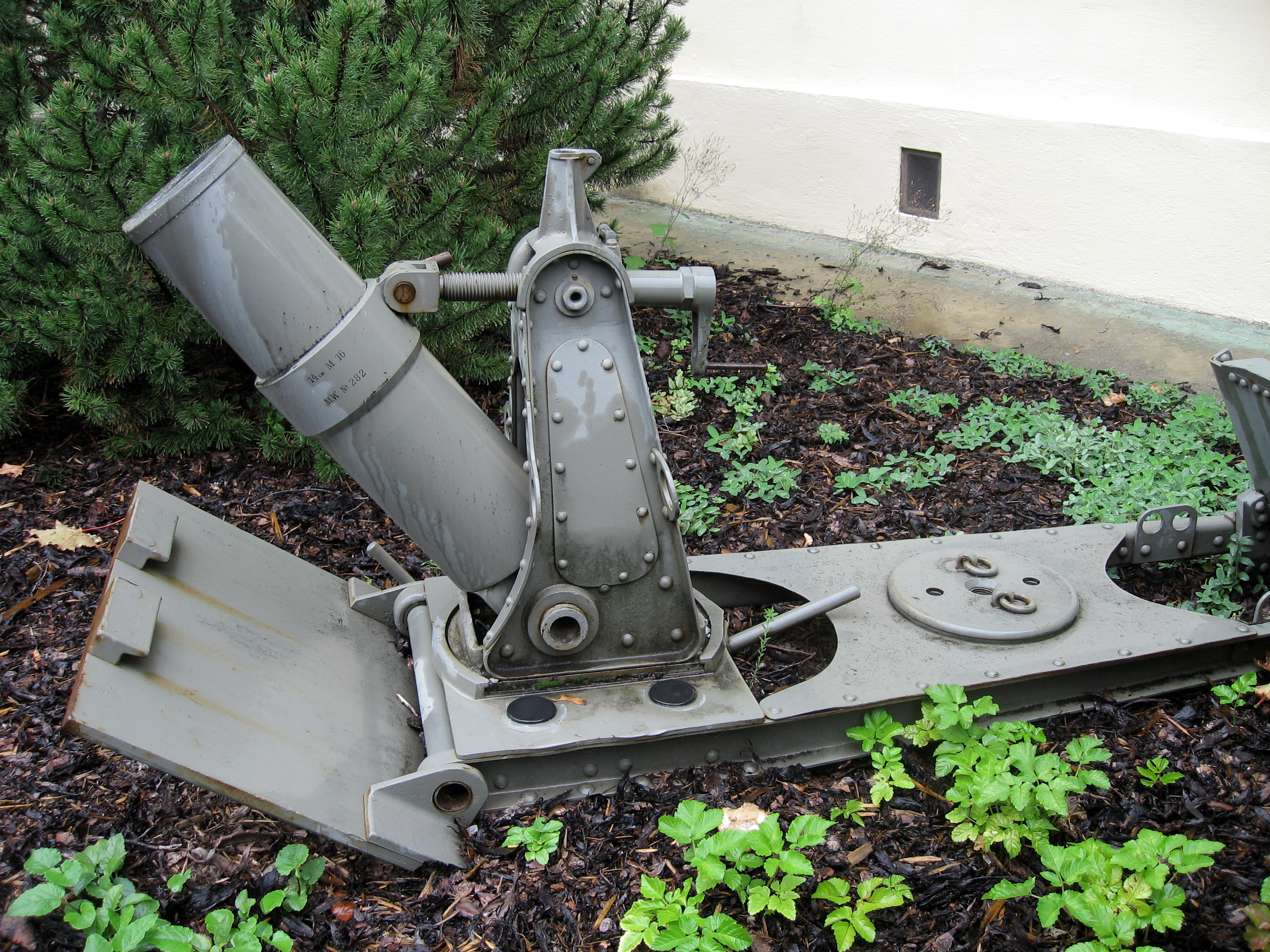
- M 16 model at the Tiroler Kaiserjägermuseum, Innsbruck, Austria
- Type: Medium trench mortar
- Place of origin: Austria-Hungary

Service history
- In service: 1915–1918
- Used by: Austria-Hungary
- Wars: World War I

Production history
- Designer: Skoda
- Designed: 1914–1915
- Manufacturer: Skoda
- Produced: 1915–1918
- Variants: M 16

Specifications
- Mass: 220 kilograms (490 lb)
- Shell: 16 kilograms (35 lb)
- Caliber: 140 mm (5.5 in)
- Traverse: 0°
- Maximum firing range: 860 metres (940 yd)

The 14 cm Minenwerfer M 15 was a medium mortar used by Austria-Hungary in World War I. It was developed by Škoda Works as an alternative to a German design from Rheinische Metallwarenfabrik/Ehrhardt for which ammunition could not be procured. It was a rigid-recoil, rifled, muzzle-loading weapon that had to be levered around to aim at new targets. It was lifted onto a two-wheel cart for transport.

An improved version, the 14 cm M16 MW, added a central barrel ring and cutouts on the side of the carriage. Rotation within the barrel was improved, greatly increasing accuracy. It weighed an extra 20 kilograms (44 lb), but had a maximum range of 1,080 metres (1,180 yd). Its transport cart was also improved.

The first batch of 100 mortars was ordered in May 1915 and a second batch in spring 1916, but deliveries were slow; only 88 of the second batch could be sent to the front by May 1916. A third batch of 300 was ordered in November 1916, but production was such that only 30 had been delivered by the spring of 1917.

== Bibliography ==
- Ortner, M. Christian. The Austro-Hungarian Artillery From 1867 to 1918: Technology, Organization, and Tactics. Vienna, Verlag Militaria, 2007 ISBN 978-3-902526-13-7
