= West Spring Gun =

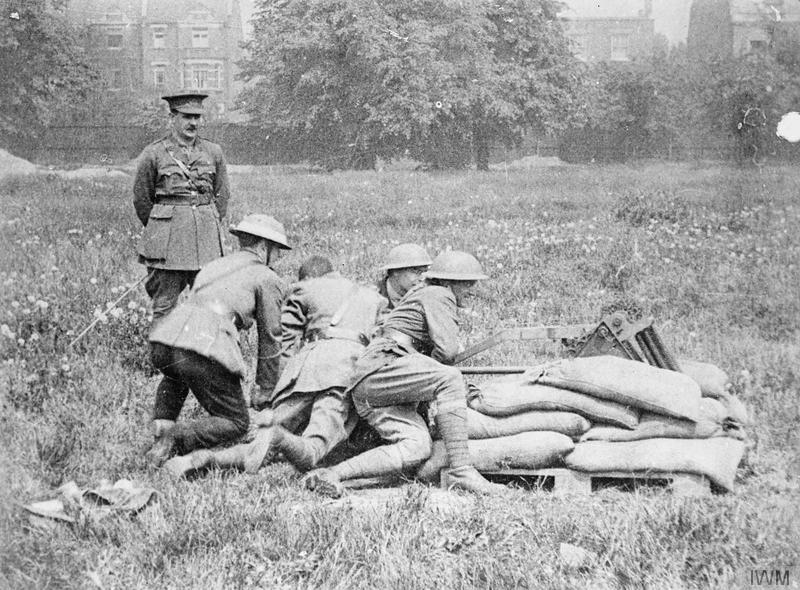
- Type: Catapult
- Place of origin: United Kingdom

Service history
- In service: 1915–1916
- Used by: United Kingdom; Canada; Australia
- Wars: World War I

Production history
- Designer: Captain Allen West
- Designed: 1915
- Manufacturer: Reason Manufacturing Company
- Produced: 1915-1916

Specifications
- Mass: 284 lb (129 kg)
- Length: 71.5 in (182 cm)
- Width: 18.5 in (47 cm)
- Height: 88 in (220 cm)
- Crew: 5
- Effective firing range: 240 yd (220 m)

The West Spring Gun was a bomb-throwing catapult used by British, Canadian and Australian forces during World War I. It was designed to throw a hand grenade in a high trajectory into enemy trenches.

== Description ==
It consisted of a metal frame supporting a throwing arm powered by 24 metal springs. It was invented by Captain Allen West in 1915 and manufactured by the Reason Manufacturing Company of Brighton, which was granted a patent for the device on 19 October of that year. Although called a catapult, it was a hybrid of a ballista and a trebuchet. It required a crew of five - three to compress the springs, one to load the bomb, and one to fire as soon as the fuse was lit or the grenade pin was pulled.

In tests, it could throw Mills bomb about 240 yd (220 m) or a 7 lb (3.2 kg) projectile about 80 yd (73 m) with a flight time of 6 or 7 seconds. In the field it generally threw a Jam Tin Grenade, No. 15 Ball grenade, No. 21 "Spherical" grenade or No. 28 chemical grenade, equipped with a slightly longer fuse (typically 9 seconds) to ensure to reach the enemy trench before exploding. It was used in combat by, amongst others, the 50th (Northumbrian) Division and the 1st Canadian Division in the Second Battle of Ypres and by Australian forces in the Gallipoli Campaign. It was generally considered to be large and cumbersome and "generally more unwieldy" than the Leach Trench Catapult. Many operators, including Captain West himself, lost fingers in the mechanism. The throw could also be unpredictable, with the bomb sometimes landing near the thrower.

Production of this and other trench catapults was officially halted in 1916, being replaced by the 2 inch Medium Trench Mortar and Stokes mortar.

== Ammunition ==
No 21 R grenade
