= Technology during World War I =

Technology available in World War I

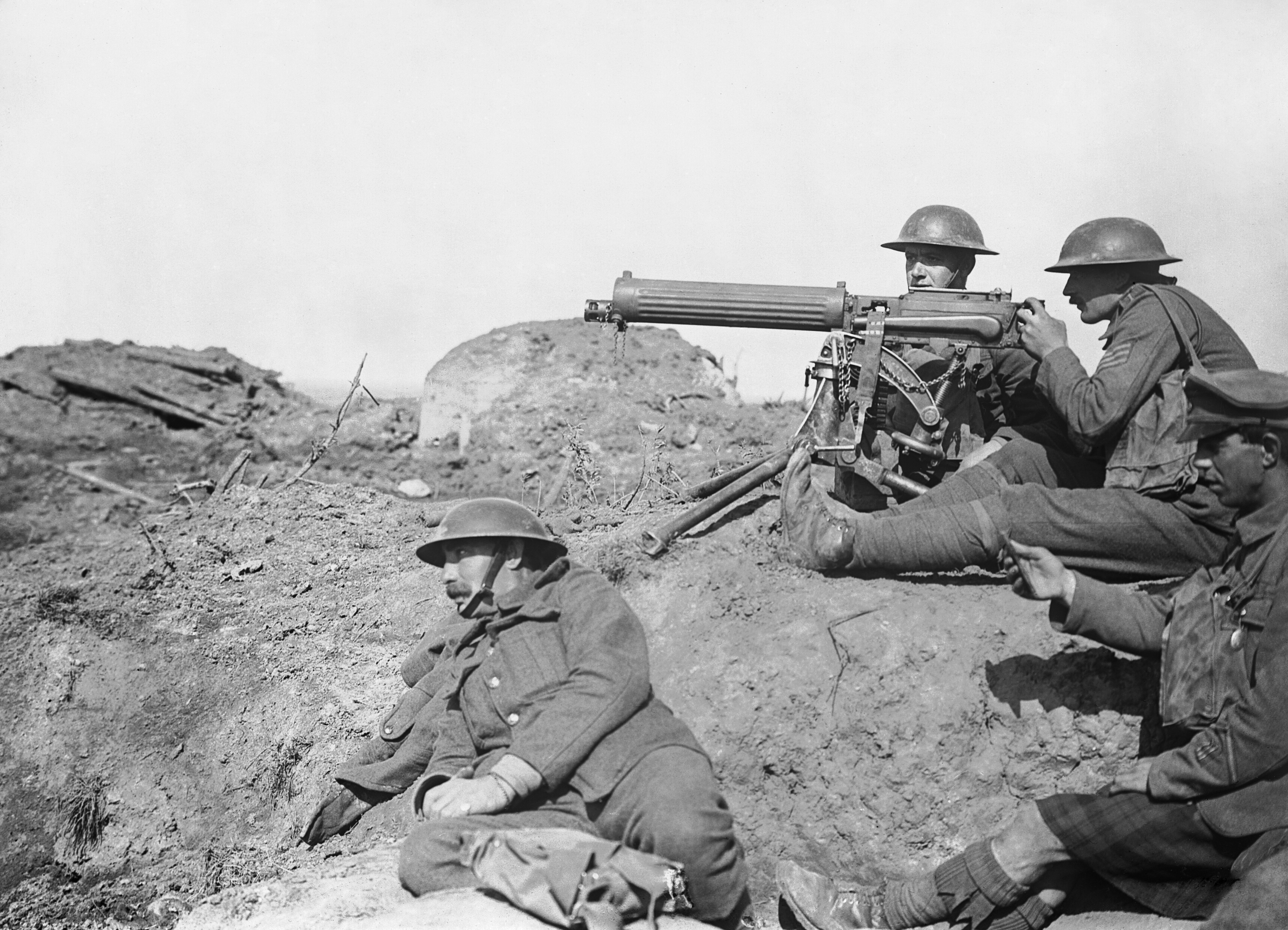
The machine gun emerged as a decisive weapon during World War I. Picture: British Vickers machine gun crew on the Western Front.

Technology during World War I (1914–1918) reflected a trend toward industrialism and the application of mass-production methods to weapons and to the technology of warfare in general. This trend began at least fifty years prior to World War I during the American Civil War of 1861–1865; this continued through many smaller conflicts in which soldiers and strategists tested new weapons.

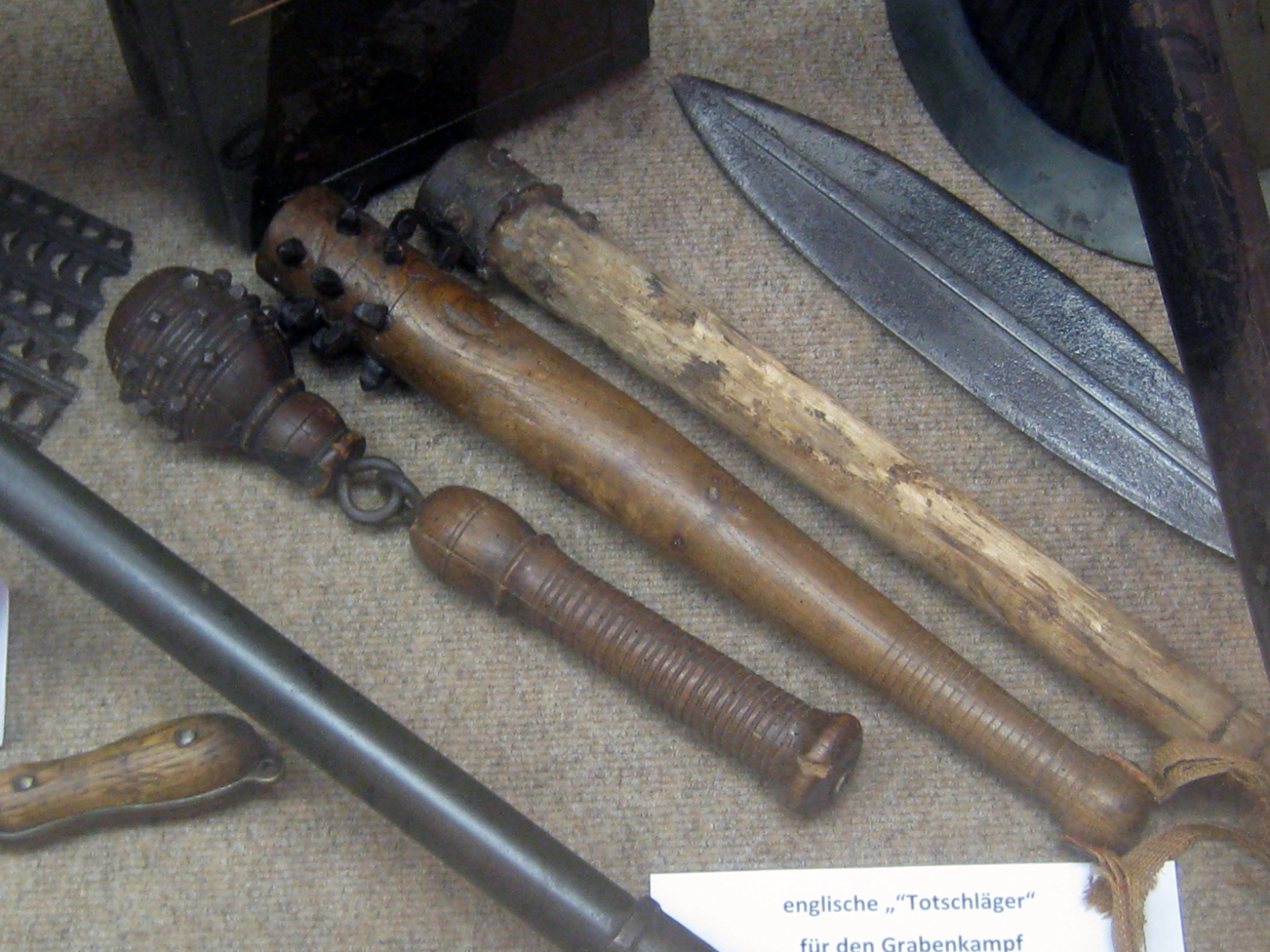
British improvised weapons in Fort Reuenthal

World War I weapons included types standardised and improved over the preceding period, together with some newly developed types using innovative technology and a number of improvised weapons used in trench warfare. Military technology of the time included important innovations in machine guns, grenades, and artillery, along with essentially new weapons such as submarines, poison gas, warplanes and tanks.

The earlier years of the First World War could be characterized as a clash of 20th-century technology with 19th-century military science creating ineffective battles with huge numbers of casualties on both sides. On land, the quick descent into trench warfare came as a surprise. It was only in the final year of the war that the major armies made effective steps in revolutionizing matters of command and control and tactics to adapt to the modern battlefield and start to harness the myriad new technologies to effective military purposes. Tactical reorganizations (such as shifting the focus of command from the 100+ man company to the 10+ man squad) went hand-in-hand with armoured cars, the first submachine guns, and automatic rifles that a single individual soldier could carry and use.

== Trench warfare ==
Much of the combat involved trench warfare, in which hundreds often died for each metre gained. Many of the deadliest battles in history occurred during World War I. Such battles include Ypres, the Marne, Cambrai, the Somme, Verdun, and Gallipoli. The Germans employed the Haber process of nitrogen fixation to provide their forces with a constant supply of gunpowder despite the British naval blockade. Artillery was responsible for the largest number of casualties and consumed vast quantities of explosives.

Trench warfare led to the development of the concrete pill box, a small, hardened blockhouse that could be used to deliver machine gun fire. Pillboxes could be placed across a battlefield with interlocking fields of fire.

Because attacking an entrenched enemy was so difficult, tunnel warfare became a major effort during the war. Once enemy positions were undermined, huge amounts of explosives would be planted and detonated to prepare for an overland charge. Sensitive listening devices that could detect the sounds of digging were crucial for defense against these underground incursions. The British proved especially adept at these tactics, thanks to the skill of their tunnel-digging "sappers" and the sophistication of their listening devices.

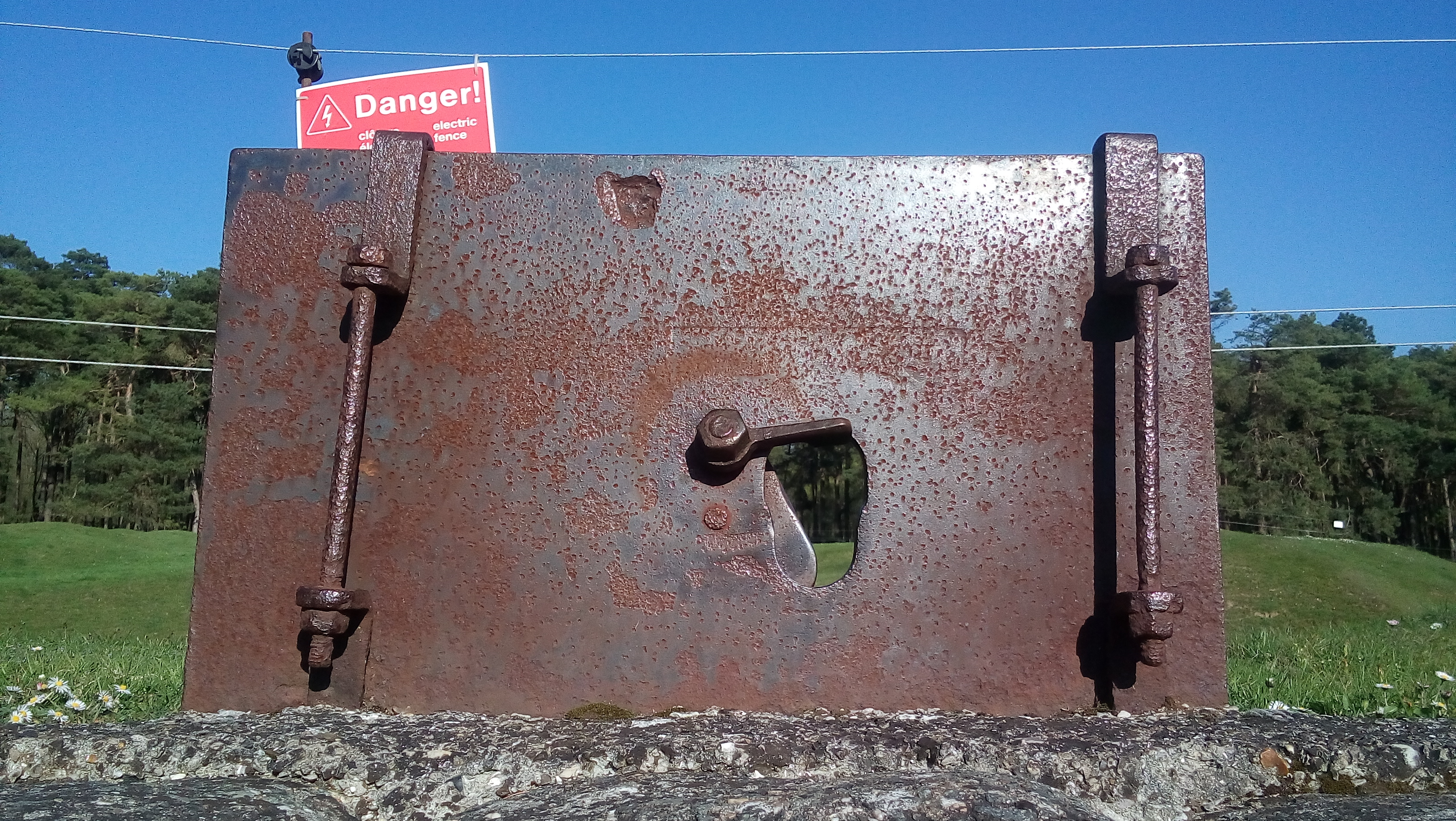
A rusty sniper shield in a WWI trench used during the Battle of Vimy Ridge at the Canadian National Vimy Memorial Park 2019

During the war, the immobility of trench warfare and a need for protection from snipers created a requirement for loopholes both for discharging firearms and for observation. Often a steel plate was used with a "key hole", which had a rotating piece to cover the loophole when not in use.

=== Clothing ===
The British and German armies had already changed from red coat (British army) (1902) or Prussian blue (1910) for field uniforms, to less conspicuous khaki or field gray. Adolphe Messimy, Joseph Gallieni and other French leaders had proposed following suit, but the French army marched to war in their traditional red trousers, and only began receiving the new "horizon blue" ones in 1915.

A type of raincoat for British officers, introduced long before the war, gained fame as the trench coat.

The Germans wanted better soldier head protection, so they hastened to develop new steel helmets in December 1915, replacing the old leather Pickelhaube.

=== Observation trees ===
Observing the enemy in trench warfare was difficult, prompting the invention of technology such as the camouflage tree, a man made observation tower that enables forces to discreetly observe their enemy.

== Artillery ==
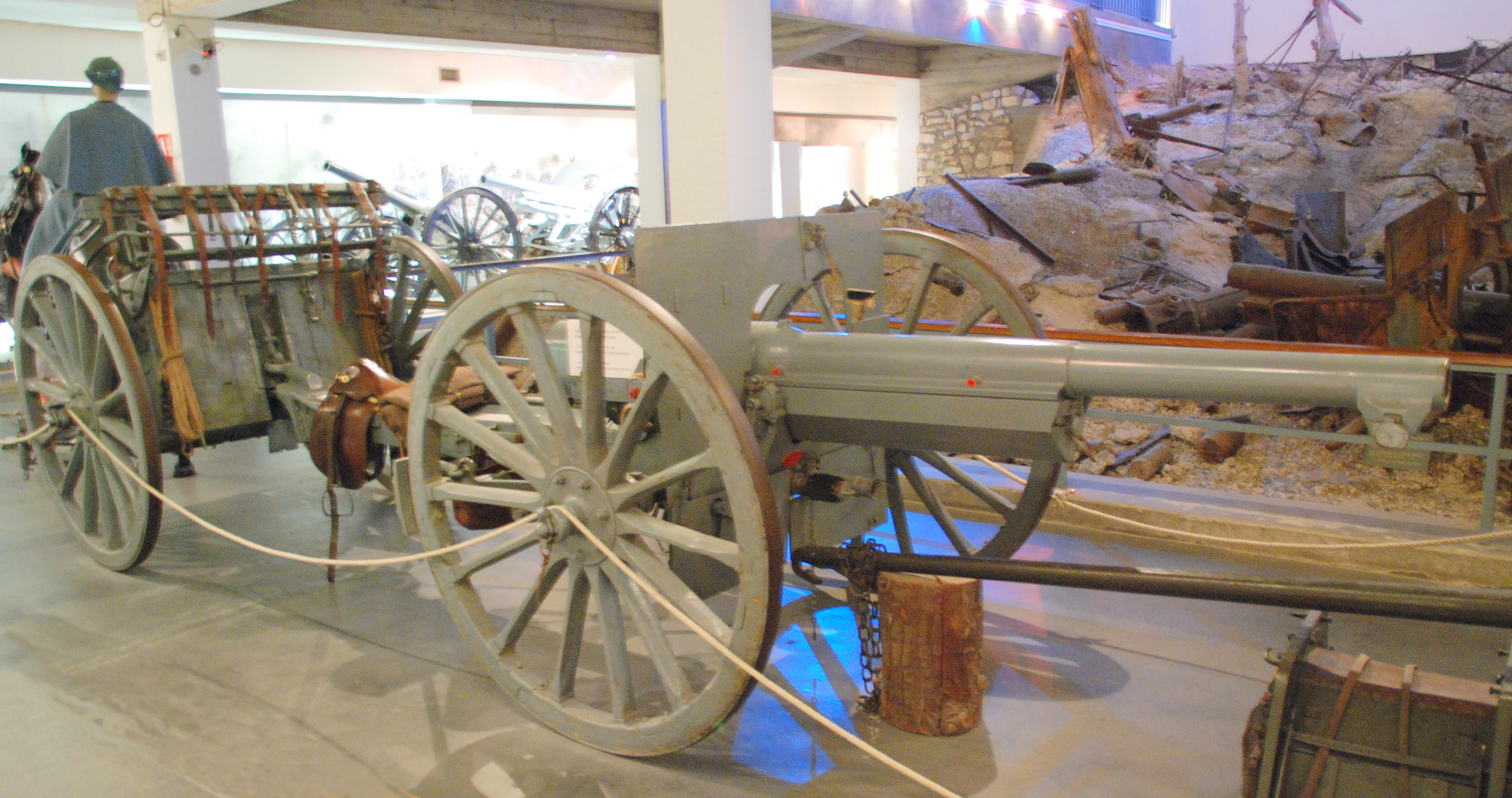
French Canon de 75 modèle 1897 gave quick, accurate fire in a small, agile unit, but the Western Front often needed longer range

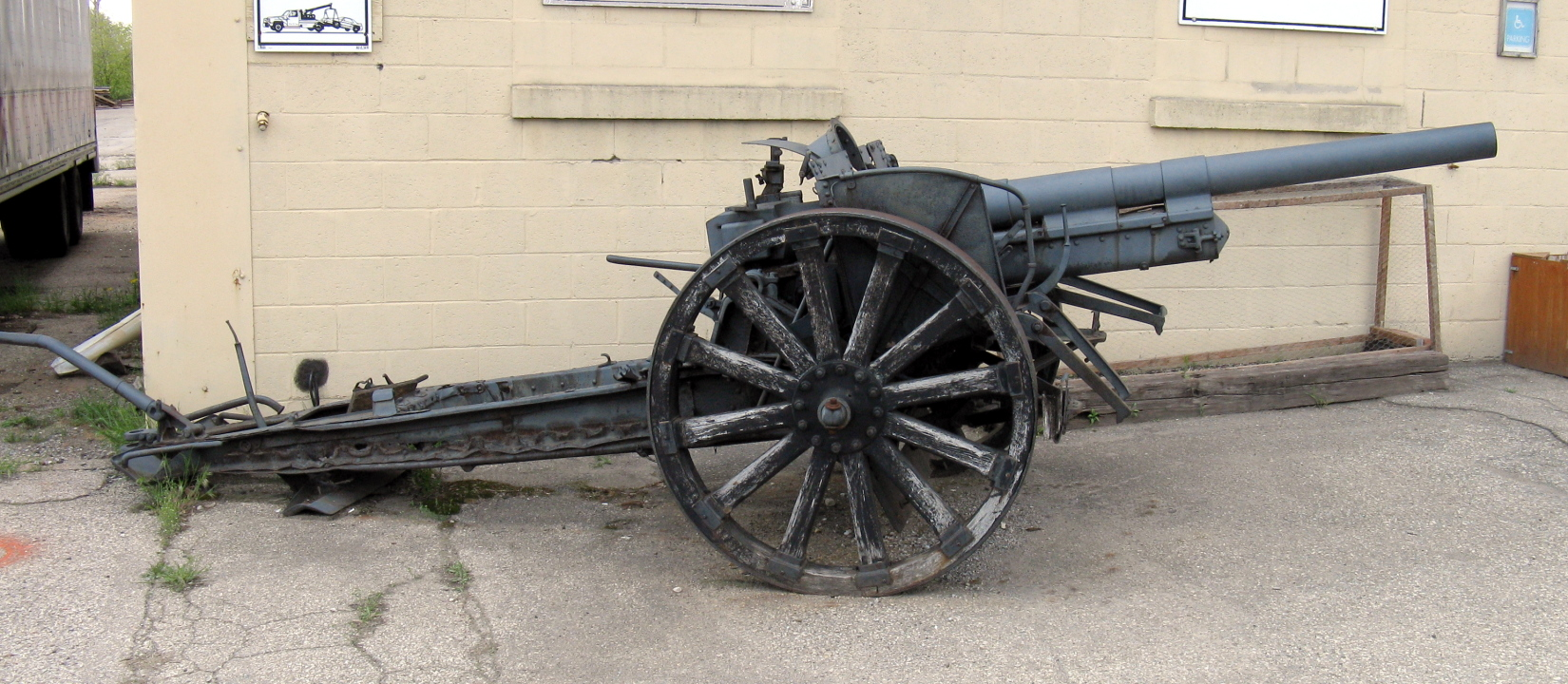
German 7.7 cm FK 16, developed during the war because an earlier model had insufficient range

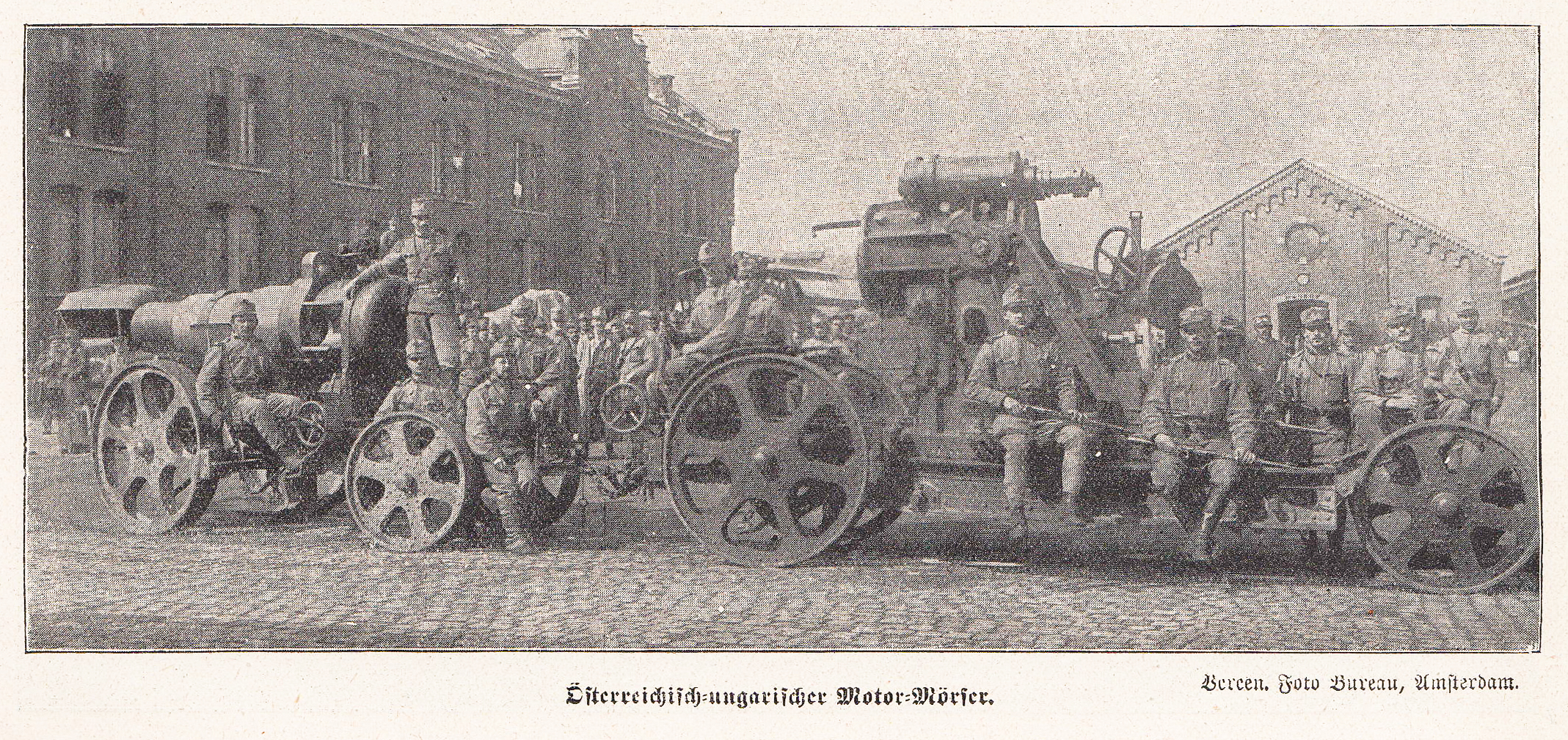
Austro-Hungarian artillery 1914

Artillery also underwent a revolution. In 1914, cannons were positioned in the front line and fired directly at their targets. By 1917, indirect fire with guns (as well as mortars and even machine guns) was commonplace, using new techniques for spotting and ranging, notably, aircraft and the often overlooked field telephone.

At the beginning of the war, artillery was often sited in the front line to fire over open sights at enemy infantry. During the war, the following improvements were made:

- Indirect counter-battery fire was developed for the first time
- Forward observers were used to direct artillery positioned out of direct line of sight from the targets, and sophisticated communications and fire plans were developed
- Artillery sound ranging and flash spotting, for the location and eventual destruction of enemy batteries
- Factors such as weather, air temperature, and barrel wear could for the first time be accurately measured and taken into account for indirect fire
- The first "box barrage" in history was fired in the Battle of Neuve Chapelle in 1915; this was the use of a three- or four-sided curtain of shell-fire to prevent the movement of enemy infantry
- The creeping barrage was perfected
- The wire-cutting No. 106 fuze was developed, specifically designed to explode on contact with barbed wire, or the ground before the shell buried itself in mud, and equally effective as an anti-personnel weapon
- The first anti-aircraft guns were devised out of necessity

Germany was far ahead of the Allies in using heavy indirect fire. The German Army employed 150 mm (6 in) and 210 mm (8 in) howitzers in 1914, when typical French and British guns were only 75 mm (3 in) and 105 mm (4 in). The British had a 6-inch (152 mm) howitzer, but it was so heavy it had to be hauled to the field in pieces and assembled. The Germans also fielded Austrian 305 mm (12 in) and 420 mm (17 in) guns and, even at the beginning of the war, had inventories of various calibres of Minenwerfer, which were ideally suited for trench warfare.

Field artillery entered the war with the idea that each gun should be accompanied by hundreds of shells, and armouries ought to have about a thousand on hand for resupply. This proved utterly inadequate when it became commonplace for a gun to sit in one place and fire a hundred shells or more per day for weeks or months on end. To meet the resulting Shell Crisis of 1915, factories were hastily converted from other purposes to make more ammunition. Railways to the front were expanded or built, leaving the question of the last mile. Horses in World War I were the main answer, and their high death rate seriously weakened the Central Powers late in the war. In many places the newly invented trench railways helped. The new motor trucks as yet lacked pneumatic tires, versatile suspension, and other improvements that in later decades would allow them to perform well.

== Poison gas ==
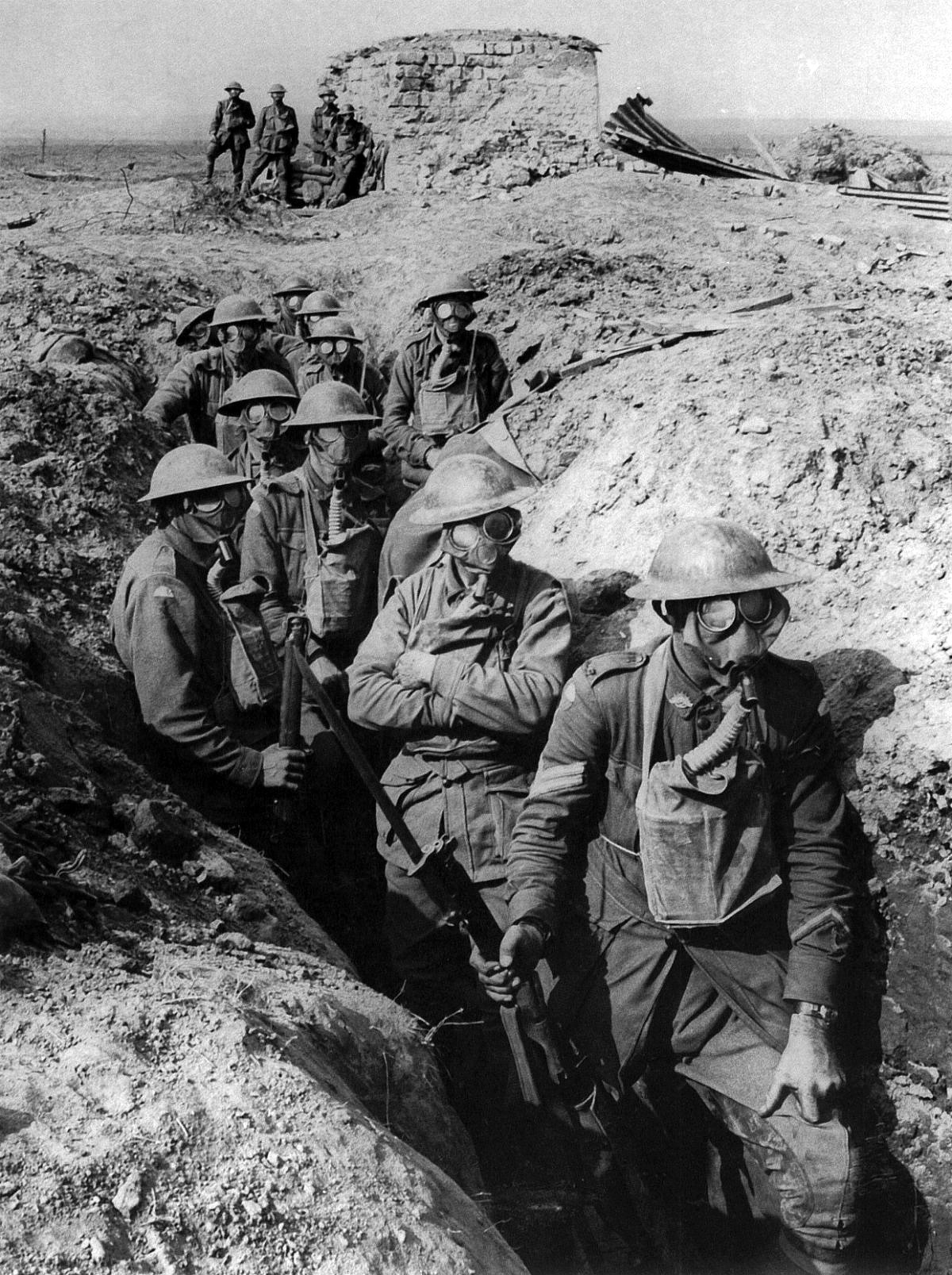
Australian infantry with gas masks, Ypres, 1917.

The widespread use of chemical warfare was a distinguishing feature of the conflict. Gases used included Chlorine, mustard gas and phosgene. Relatively few war casualties were caused by gas, as effective countermeasures to gas attacks were quickly created, such as gas masks. The use of chemical warfare and small-scale strategic bombing (as opposed to tactical bombing) were both outlawed by the Hague Conventions of 1899 and 1907, and both proved to be of limited effectiveness, though they captured the public imagination.

At the beginning of the war, Germany had the most advanced chemical industry in the world, accounting for more than 80% of the world's dye and chemical production. Although the use of poison gas had been banned by the Hague Conventions of 1899 and 1907, Germany turned to this industry for what it hoped would be a decisive weapon to break the deadlock of trench warfare. Chlorine gas was first used on the battlefield in April 1915 at the Second Battle of Ypres in Belgium. The unknown gas appeared to be a simple smoke screen, used to hide attacking soldiers, and Allied troops were ordered to the front trenches to repel the expected attack. The gas had a devastating effect, killing many defenders or, when the wind direction changed and blew the gas back, many attackers.

The wind being unreliable, another way had to be found to transmit the gas. It began being delivered in artillery shells. Later, mustard gas, phosgene and other gasses were used. Britain and France soon followed suit with their own gas weapons. The first defenses against gas were makeshift, mainly rags soaked in water or urine. Later, relatively effective gas masks were developed, and these greatly reduced the effectiveness of gas as a weapon. Although it sometimes resulted in brief tactical advantages and probably caused over 1,000,000 casualties, gas seemed to have had no significant effect on the course of the war.

Chemical weapons were easily attained, and cheap. Gas was especially effective against troops in trenches and bunkers that protected them from other weapons. Most chemical weapons attacked an individual's respiratory system. The concept of choking easily caused fear in soldiers and the resulting terror affected them psychologically. Because there was such a great fear of chemical weapons it was not uncommon that a soldier would panic and misinterpret symptoms of the common cold as being affected by a poisonous gas.

== Command and control ==
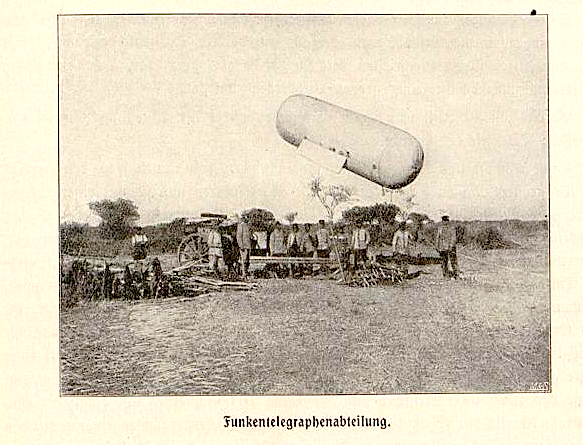
Mobile radio station in German South West Africa, using a hydrogen balloon to lift the antenna

The introduction of radio telegraphy was a significant step in communication during World War I. The stations utilized at that time were spark-gap transmitters. As an example, the information of the start of World War I was transmitted to German South West Africa on 2 August 1914 via radio telegraphy from the Nauen transmitter station via a relay station in Kamina and Lomé in Togo to the radio station in Windhoek.

In the early days of the war, generals tried to direct tactics from headquarters many miles from the front, with messages being carried back and forth by runners or motorcycle couriers. It was soon realized that more immediate methods of communication were needed.

Radio sets of the period were too heavy to carry into battle, and field telephone lines laid were quickly broken. Either one was subject to eavesdropping, and trench codes were not very satisfactory. Runners, flashing lights, and mirrors were often used instead; dogs were also used, but were only used occasionally as troops tended to adopt them as pets and men would volunteer to go as runners in the dog's place. There were also aircraft (called "contact patrols") that carried messages between headquarters and forward positions, sometimes dropping their messages without landing. Technical advances in radio, however, continued during the war and radio telephony was perfected, being most useful for airborne artillery spotters.

The new long-range artillery developed just before the war now had to fire at positions it could not see. Typical tactics were to pound the enemy front lines and then stop to let infantry move forward, hoping that the enemy line was broken, though it rarely was. The lifting and then the creeping barrage were developed to keep artillery fire landing directly in front of the infantry "as it advanced." Communications being impossible, the danger was that the barrage would move too fast – losing the protection – or too slowly – holding up the advance.

There were also countermeasures to these artillery tactics: by aiming a counter barrage directly behind an enemy's creeping barrage, one could target the infantry that was following the creeping barrage. Microphones (Sound ranging) were used to triangulate the position of enemy guns and engage in counter-battery fire. Muzzle flashes of guns could also be spotted and used to target enemy artillery.

The impressive spread of telecommunications in the armed forces during WWI – which extended commanders' command and control over distant forces and ships – also led to the Intelligence branch assuming an ever greater importance. The growth of military telephone and radiotelegraphic communications encouraged all Intelligence Services to study how to extract the greatest amount of intel from the enemies' communication systems, by relying on some inherent weaknesses of those media. Radio interception was particularly easy, creating the need to invent World War I cryptography. Even the earliest episodes of the war showed, often surprisingly, what type of impact the eavesdropping and interpretation of the enemy's transmissions could have on military operations. As such, this period witnessed significant developments in the intelligence category today commonly known as signals intelligence, or SIGINT. Exploitation of intercepted Russian radio signals contributed to the German victory at Tannenberg in August 1914. Even when messages could not be decoded, radio direction finding was used to track the motion of enemy units.

== Railways ==
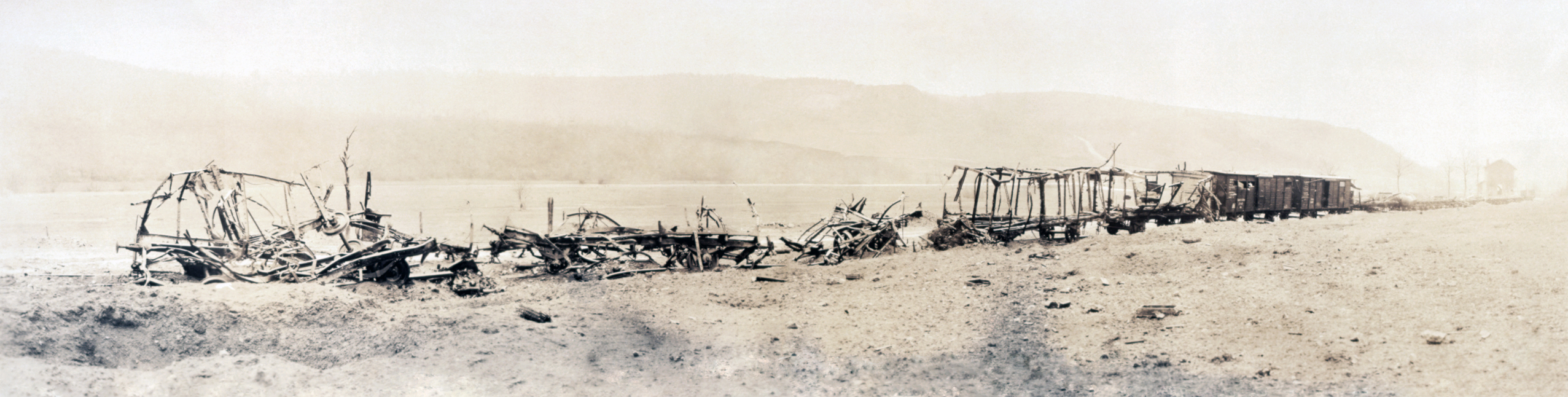
German ammunition train wrecked by shell fire, c. 1918.

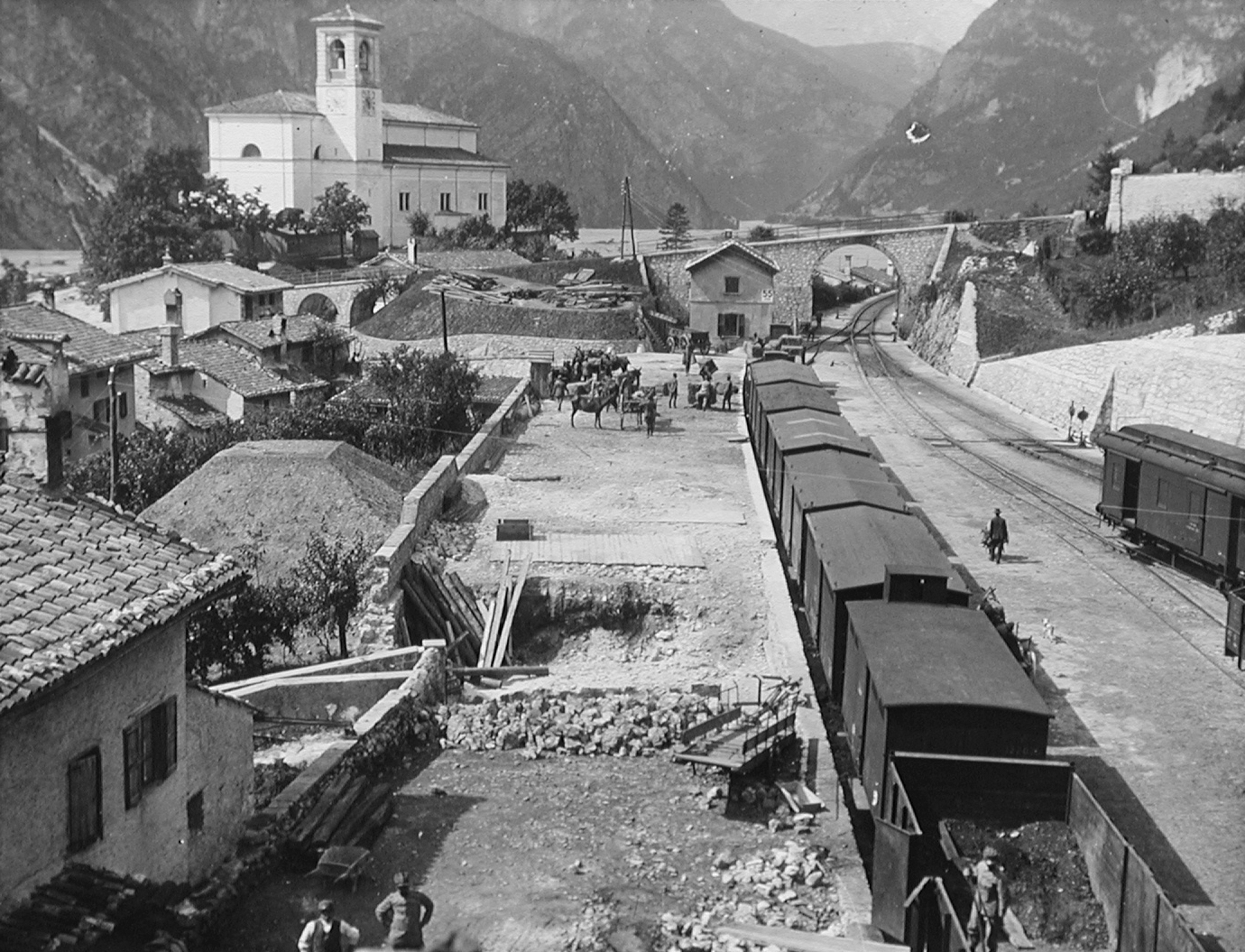
Italian Army – World War I – The train station in Chiusaforte

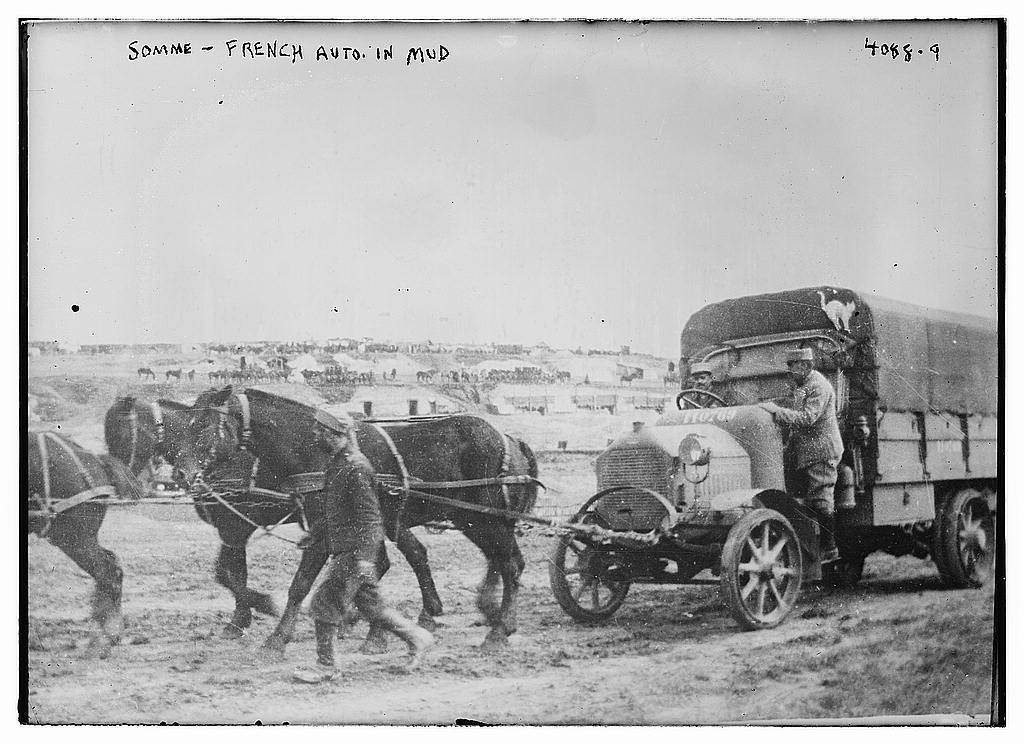
Motor trucks rarely performed well

Railways dominated in this war as in no other. The German strategy was known beforehand by the Allies simply because of the vast marshaling yards on the Belgian border that had no other purpose than to deliver the mobilized German army to its start point. The German mobilization plan was little more than a vast detailed railway timetable. Men and material could get to the front at an unprecedented rate by rail, but trains were vulnerable at the front itself. Thus, armies could only advance at the pace that they could build or rebuild a railway, e.g. the British advance across Sinai. Motorized transport was only extensively used in the last two years of World War I. After the rail head, troops moved the last mile on foot, and guns and supplies were drawn by horses and trench railways. Railways lacked the flexibility of motor transport and this lack of flexibility percolated through into the conduct during the war.

== War of attrition ==
The countries involved in the war applied the full force of industrial mass-production to the manufacture of weapons and ammunition, especially artillery shells. Women on the home-front played a crucial role in this by working in munitions factories. This complete mobilization of a nation's resources, or "total war" meant that not only the armies, but also the economies of the warring nations were in competition.

For a time, in 1914–1915, some hoped that the war could be won through an attrition of materiel—that the enemy's supply of artillery shells could be exhausted in futile exchanges. But production was ramped up on both sides and hopes proved futile. In Britain the Shell Crisis of 1915 brought down the British government, and led to the building of HM Factory, Gretna, a huge munitions factory on the English-Scottish border.

The war of attrition then focused on another resource: human lives. In the Battle of Verdun in particular, German Chief of Staff Erich Von Falkenhayn hoped to "bleed France white" through repeated attacks on this French city.

In the end, the war ended through a combination of attrition (of men and material), advances on the battlefield, arrival of American troops in large numbers, and a breakdown of morale and production on the German home-front due to an effective naval blockade of her seaports.

== Air warfare ==
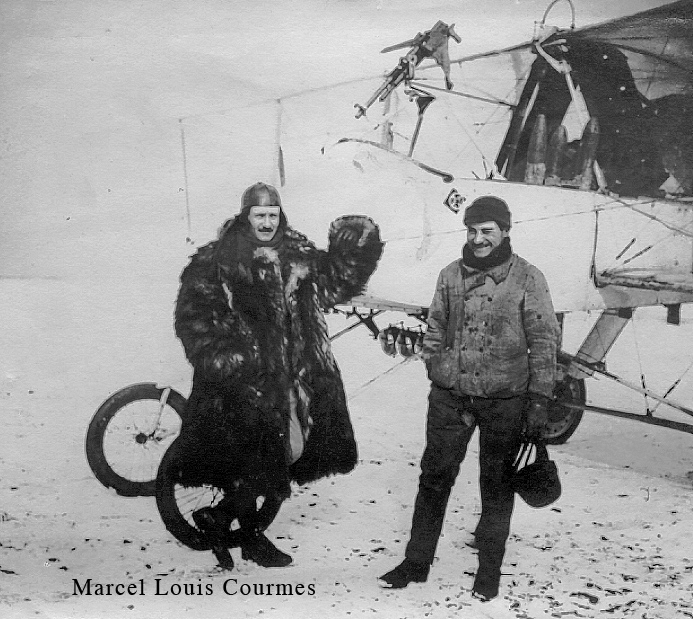
Captain Marcel Courmes, pilot of the French 2nd Bombardment, Group GB 2, August 1915

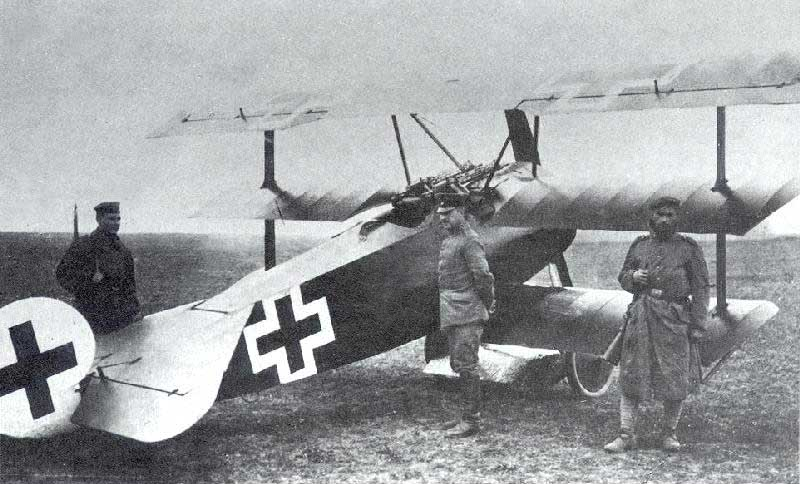
The Fokker triplane belonging to Manfred von Richthofen (the "Red Baron")

Aviation in World War I started with primitive aircraft, primitively used. Technological progress was swift, leading to ground attack, tactical bombing, and highly publicized, deadly dogfights among aircraft equipped with forward-firing, synchronized machine guns from July 1915 onwards. However, these uses made a lesser impact on the war than more mundane roles in intelligence, sea patrol and especially artillery spotting. Antiaircraft warfare also had its beginnings in this war.

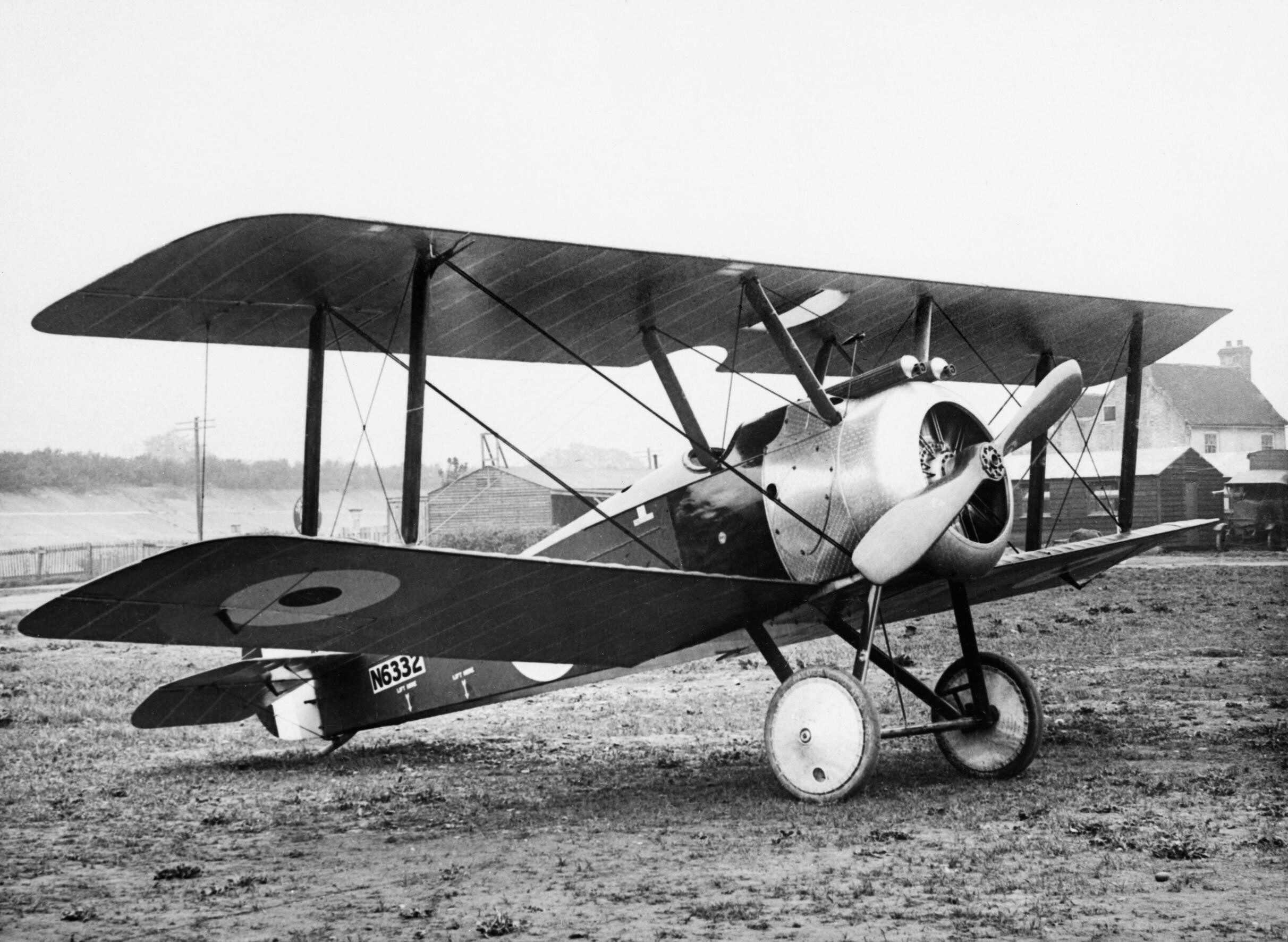
Royal Air Force Sopwith Camel. In April 1917, the average life expectancy of a British pilot on the Western Front was 93 flying hours.

Fixed-wing aircraft were first used militarily by the Italians in Libya on 23 October 1911 during the Italo-Turkish War for reconnaissance, soon followed by the dropping of grenades and aerial photography the next year. By 1914, their military utility was obvious. They were initially used for reconnaissance and ground attack. To shoot down enemy planes, anti-aircraft guns and fighter aircraft were developed. Strategic bombers were created, principally by the Germans and British, though the former used Zeppelins as well. Perhaps the most famous fighter plane during World War 1 was the Fokker as it was the first to include a synchronized machine gun. Towards the end of the conflict, aircraft carriers were used for the first time, with HMS Furious launching Sopwith Camels in a raid to destroy the Zeppelin hangars at Tønder in 1918.

Manned observation balloons, floating high above the trenches, were used as stationary reconnaissance platforms, reporting enemy movements and directing artillery. Balloons commonly had a crew of two, equipped with parachutes, so that if there was an enemy air attack the crew could parachute to safety. At the time, parachutes were too heavy to be used by pilots of aircraft (with their marginal power output), and smaller versions were not developed until the end of the war; they were also opposed by the British leadership, who feared they might promote cowardice.

Recognised for their value as observation platforms, balloons were important targets for enemy aircraft. To defend them against air attack, they were heavily protected by anti-aircraft guns and patrolled by friendly aircraft; to attack them, unusual weapons such as air-to-air rockets were tried. Thus, the reconnaissance value of blimps and balloons contributed to the development of air-to-air combat between all types of aircraft, and to the trench stalemate, because it was impossible to move large numbers of troops undetected. The Germans conducted air raids on England during 1915 and 1916 with airships, hoping to damage British morale and cause aircraft to be diverted from the front lines, and indeed the resulting panic led to the diversion of several squadrons of fighters from France.

While early air spotters were unarmed, they soon began firing at each other with handheld weapons. An arms race commenced, quickly leading to increasingly agile planes equipped with machine guns. A key innovation was the interrupter gear, a Dutch invention that allowed a machine gun to be mounted behind the propeller so the pilot could fire directly ahead, along the plane's flight path.

German strategic bombing during World War I struck Warsaw, Paris, London and other cities. Germany led the world in Zeppelins, and used these airships to make occasional bombing raids on military targets, London and other British cities, without great effect. Later in the war, Germany introduced long range strategic bombers. Damage was again minor but they forced the British air forces to maintain squadrons of fighters in England to defend against air attack, depriving the British Expeditionary Force of planes, equipment, and personnel badly needed on the Western front.

== Mobility ==
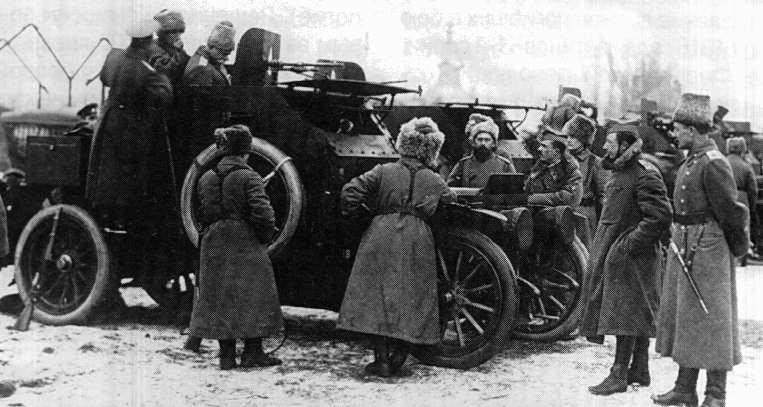
Mors-Minerva armoured car of the Belgian Expeditionary Corps in Russia, c. January 1916

In the early days of the war, armoured cars armed with machine guns were organized into combat units, along with cyclist infantry and machine guns mounted on motor cycle sidecars. Though not able to assault entrenched positions, they provided mobile fire support to infantry, and performed scouting, reconnaissance, and other roles similar to cavalry. After trench warfare took hold of major battle-lines, opportunities for such vehicles greatly diminished, though they continued to see use in the more open campaigns in Russia and the Middle East.

Between late 1914 and early 1918, the Western Front hardly moved. When the Russian Empire surrendered after the October Revolution in 1917, Germany was able to move many troops to the Western Front. With new stormtrooper infantry trained in infiltration tactics to exploit enemy weak points and penetrate into rear areas, they launched a series of offensives in the spring of 1918. In the largest of these, Operation Michael, General Oskar von Hutier pushed forward 60 kilometers, gaining in a couple weeks what France and Britain had spent years to achieve. Although initially successful tactically, these offensives stalled after outrunning their horse-drawn supply, artillery, and reserves, leaving German forces weakened and exhausted.

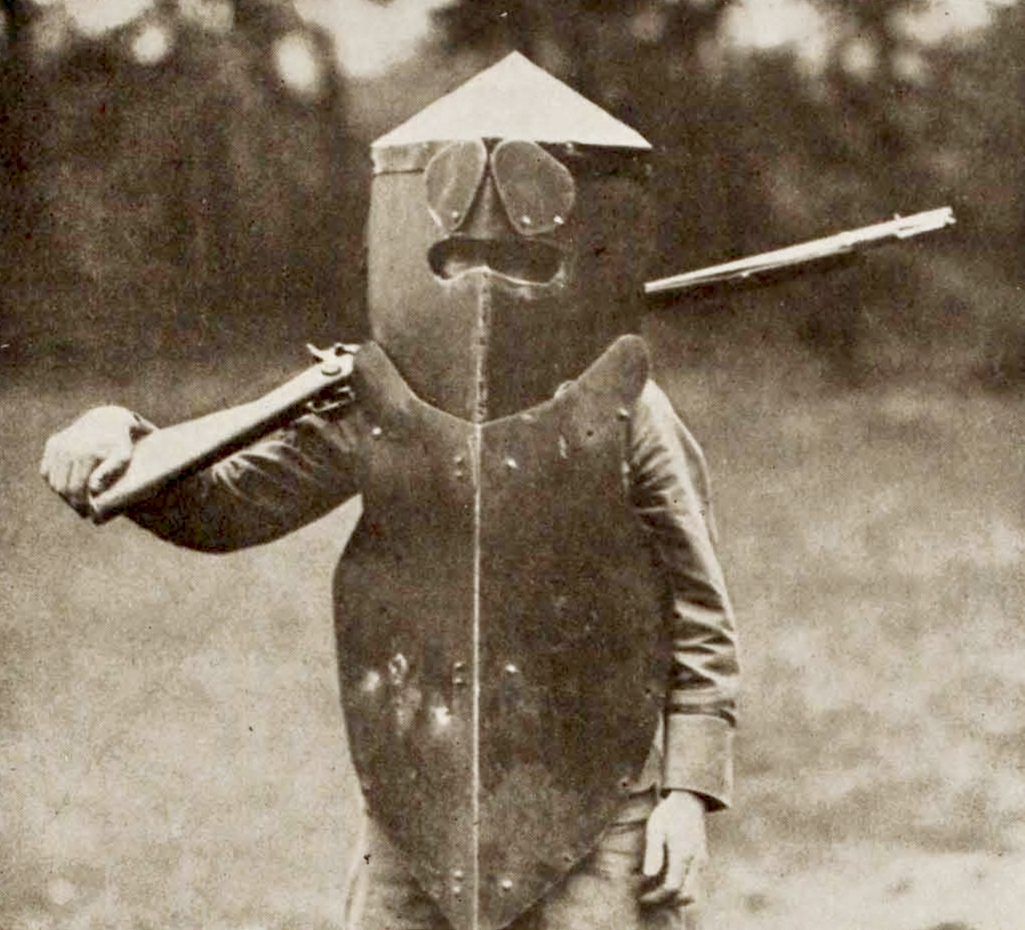
Brewster Body Shield, United States Army

The mobile personnel shield was a less successful attempt at restoring mobility. Several kinds of bullet-proof body armor were tested in use, but they more impaired movement than protected the body.

In the Battle of Amiens of August 1918, the Triple Entente forces began a counterattack that would be called the "Hundred Days Offensive." The Australian and Canadian divisions that spearheaded the attack managed to advance 13 kilometers on the first day alone. These battles marked the end of trench warfare on the Western Front and a return to mobile warfare.

After the war, the defeated Germans would seek to combine their infantry-based mobile warfare of 1918 with vehicles, eventually leading to blitzkrieg, or 'lightning warfare'.

=== Tanks ===
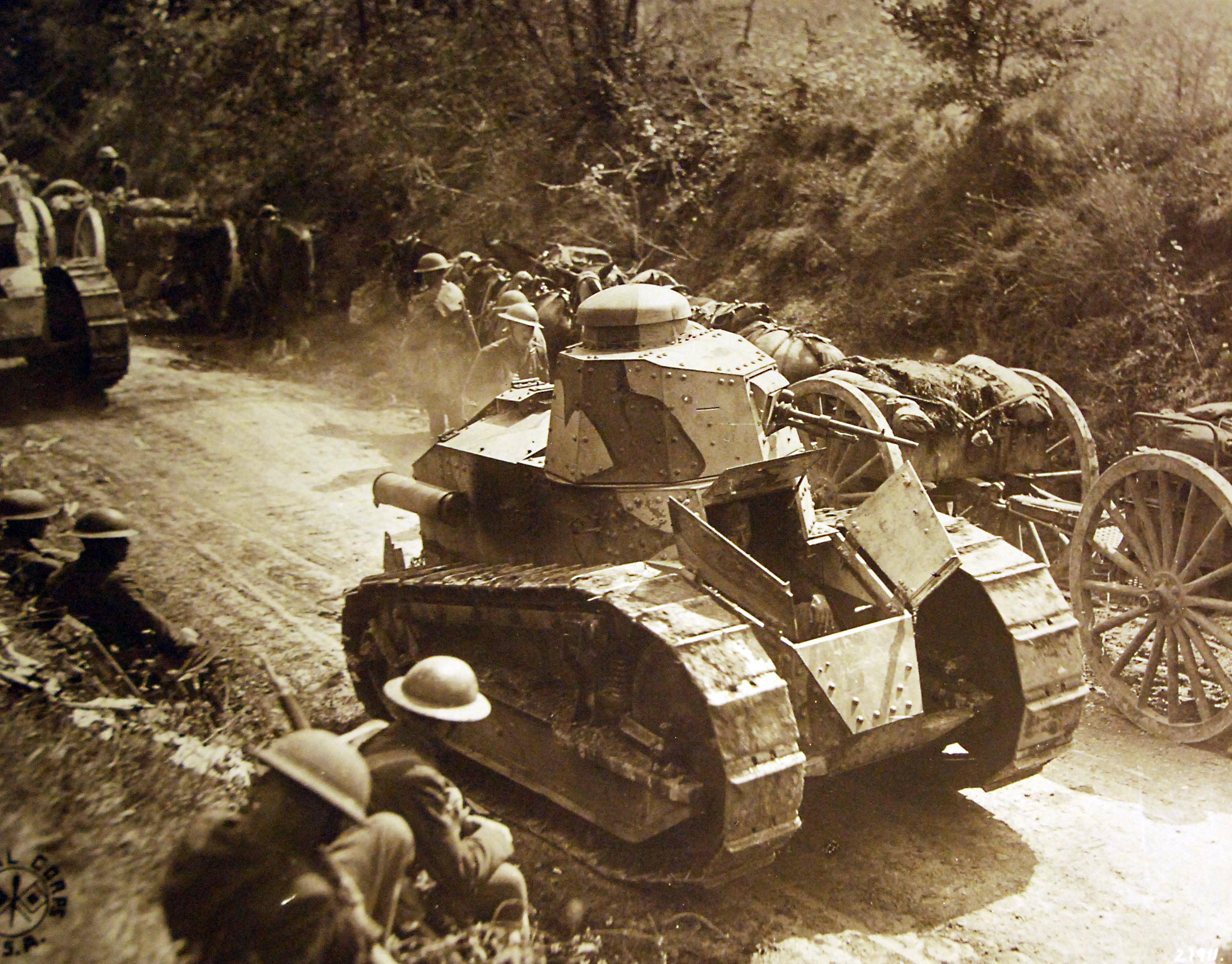
Renault FTs in U.S. service, Juvigny, France

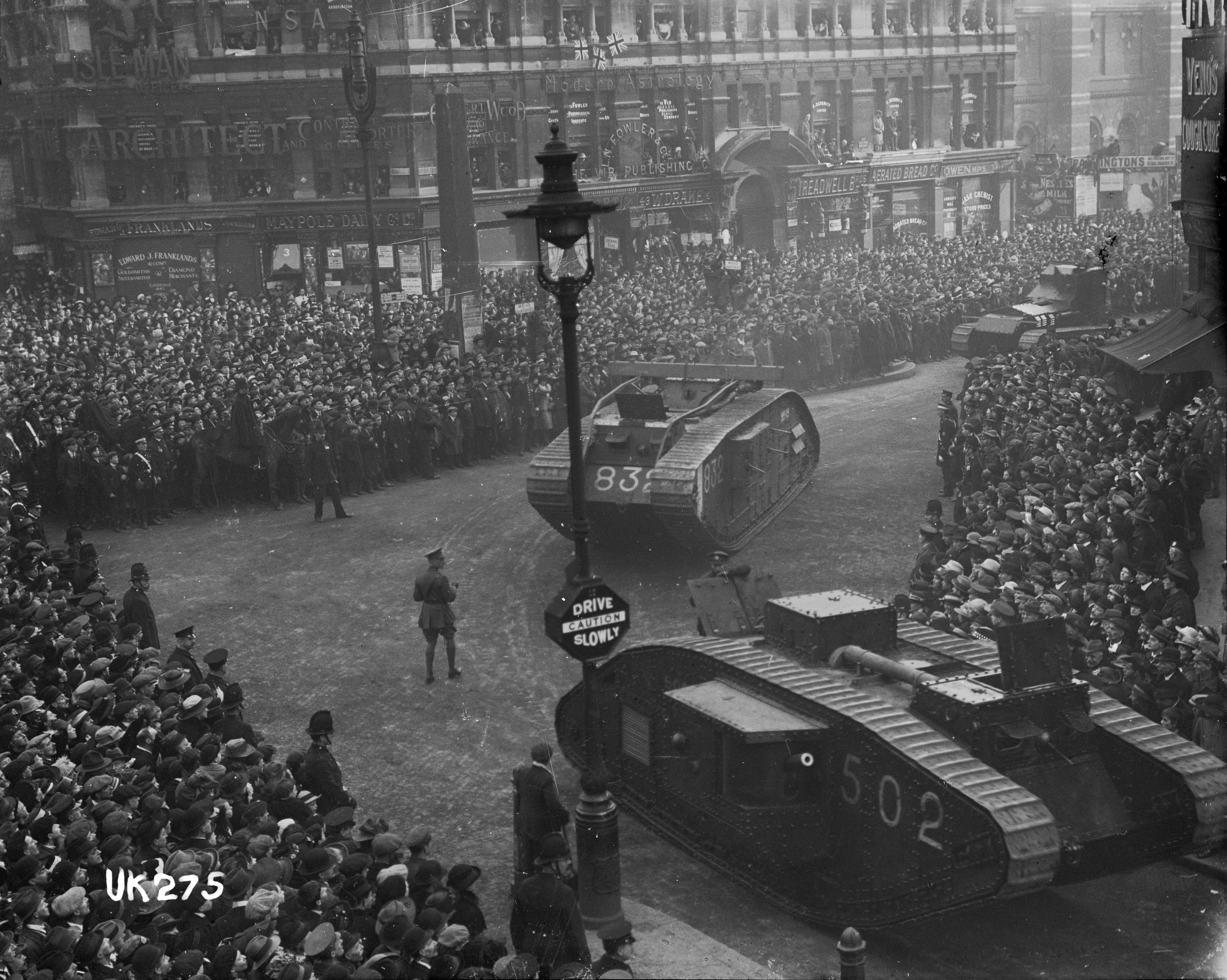
Tanks on parade in London at the end of World War I

Although the concept of the tank had been suggested as early as the 1890s, authorities showed little more than a passing interest in them until the trench stalemate of World War I caused reconsideration. In early 1915, the British Royal Navy and French industrialists both started dedicated development of tanks.

Basic tank design combined several existing technologies. It included armour plating thick enough to be proof against all standard infantry arms, caterpillar track for mobility over the shell-torn battlefield, the four-stroke gasoline powered internal combustion engine (refined in the 1870s), and heavy firepower, provided by the same machine guns which had recently become so dominant in warfare, or even light artillery guns.

In Britain, a committee was formed to work out a practical tank design. The outcome was large tanks with a rhomboidal shape, to allow crossing of an 8-foot-wide (2.4 m) trench: the Mark I tank, with the "male" versions mounting small naval guns and machine guns, and the "female" carrying only machine guns.

In France, several competing arms industry organizations each proposed radically different designs. Smaller tanks became favored, leading to the Renault FT tank, in part by being able to leverage the engines and manufacturing techniques of commercial tractors and automobiles.

Although the tanks' initial appearance on the battlefield in 1916 terrified some German troops, such engagements provided more opportunities for development than battle successes. Early tanks were unreliable, breaking down often. Germans learned they were vulnerable to direct hits from field artillery and heavy mortars, their trenches were widened and other obstacles devised to halt them, and special anti-tank rifles were rapidly developed. Also, both Britain and France found new tactics and training were required to make effective use of their tanks, such as larger coordinated formations of tanks and close support with infantry. Once tanks could be organized in the hundreds, as in the opening assault of the Battle of Cambrai in November 1917, they began to have notable impact.

Throughout the remainder of the war, new tank designs often revealed flaws in battle, to be addressed in later designs, but reliability remained the primary weakness of tanks. In the Battle of Amiens, a major Entente counteroffensive near the end of the war, British forces went to field with 532 tanks; after several days, only a few were still in commission, with those that suffered mechanical difficulties outnumbering those disabled by enemy fire.

Germany utilized many captured enemy tanks, and made a few of their own late in the war.

In the last year of the war, despite rapidly increasing production (especially by France) and improving designs, tank technology struggled to make more than a modest impact on the war's overall progress. Plan 1919 proposed the future use of massive tank formations in great offensives combined with ground attack aircraft.

Even without achieving the decisive results hoped for during World War I, tank technology and mechanized warfare had been launched and would grow increasingly sophisticated in the years following the war. By World War II, the tank would evolve into a fearsome weapon critical to restoring mobility to land warfare.

== At sea ==
The years leading up to the war saw the use of improved metallurgical and mechanical techniques to produce larger ships with larger guns and, in reaction, more armour. The launching of HMS Dreadnought (1906) revolutionized battleship construction, leaving many ships obsolete before they were completed. German ambitions brought an Anglo-German naval arms race in which the Imperial German Navy was built up from a small force to the world's most modern and second most powerful. However, even this high-technology navy entered the war with a mix of newer ships and obsolete older ones.

The advantage was in long-range gunnery, and naval battles took place at far greater distances than before. The 1916 Battle of Jutland demonstrated the excellence of German ships and crews, but also showed that the High Seas Fleet was not big enough to challenge openly the British blockade of Germany. It was the only full-scale battle between fleets in the war.

Having the largest surface fleet, the United Kingdom sought to press its advantage. British ships blockaded German ports, hunted down German and Austro-Hungarian ships wherever they might be on the high seas, and supported actions against German colonies. The German surface fleet was largely kept in the North Sea. This situation pushed Germany, in particular, to direct its resources to a new form of naval power: submarines.

Naval mines were deployed in hundreds of thousands, or far greater numbers than in previous wars. Submarines proved surprisingly effective for this purpose. Influence mines were a new development but moored contact mines were the most numerous. They resembled those of the late 19th century, improved so they less often exploded while being laid. The Allies produced enough mines to build the North Sea Mine Barrage to help bottle the Germans into the North Sea, but it was too late to make much difference.

=== Submarines ===
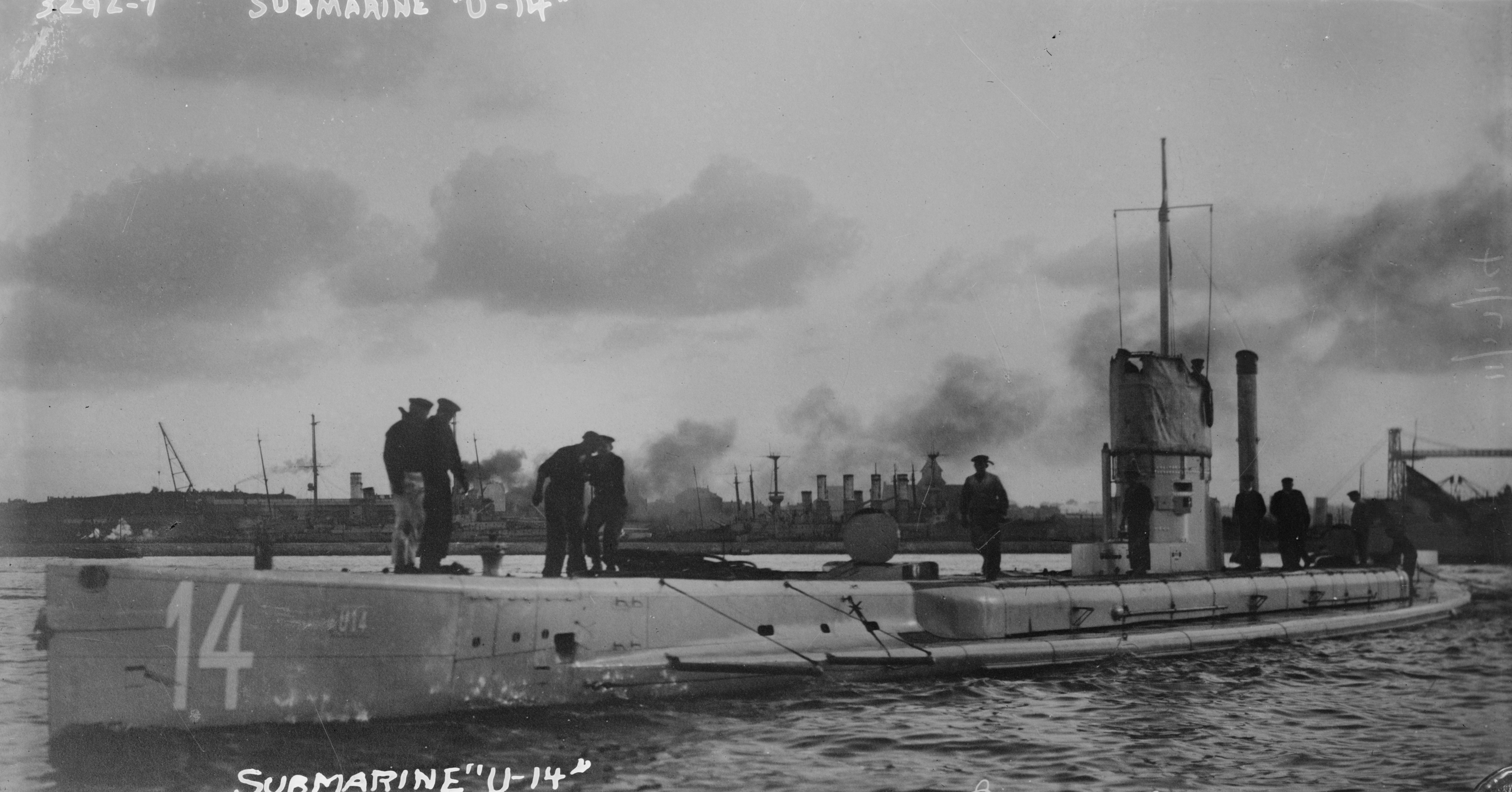
German U-boat U-14

Germany deployed U-boats (submarines) after the war began. Alternating between restricted and unrestricted submarine warfare in the Atlantic, the Imperial German Navy employed them to deprive the British Isles of vital supplies. The deaths of British merchant sailors and the seeming invulnerability of U-boats led to the development of depth charges (1916), hydrophones (sonar, 1917), blimps, hunter-killer submarines (HMS R-1, 1917), forward-throwing anti-submarine weapons, and dipping hydrophones (the latter two both abandoned in 1918). To extend their operations, the Germans proposed supply submarines (1916). Most of these would be forgotten in the interwar period until World War II revived the need.

The United Kingdom relied heavily on imports to feed its population and supply its war industry, and the German Navy hoped to blockade and starve Britain using U-boats to attack merchant ships. Lieutenant Otto Weddigen remarked of the second submarine attack of the Great War:

How much they feared our submarines and how wide was the agitation caused by good little U-9 is shown by the English reports that a whole flotilla of German submarines had attacked the cruisers and that this flotilla had approached under cover of the flag of Holland. These reports were absolutely untrue. U-9 was the only submarine on deck, and she flew the flag she still flies – the German naval ensign.

Submarines soon came under persecution by submarine chasers and other small warships using hastily devised anti-submarine weapons. They could not impose an effective blockade while acting under the restrictions of the prize rules and international law of the sea. They resorted to unrestricted submarine warfare, which cost Germany public sympathy in neutral countries and was a factor contributing to the American entry into World War I.

This struggle between German submarines and British countermeasures became known as the "First Battle of the Atlantic." As German submarines became more numerous and effective, the British sought ways to protect their merchant ships. "Q-ships," attack vessels disguised as civilian ships, were one early strategy.

Consolidating merchant ships into convoys protected by one or more armed navy vessels was adopted later in the war. There was initially a great deal of debate about this approach, out of fear that it would provide German U-boats with a wealth of convenient targets. Thanks to the development of active and passive sonar devices, coupled with increasingly deadly anti-submarine weapons, the convoy system reduced British losses to U-boats to a small fraction of their former level.

Holland 602 type submarines and other Allied types were fewer, being unnecessary for the blockade of Germany.

== Small arms ==
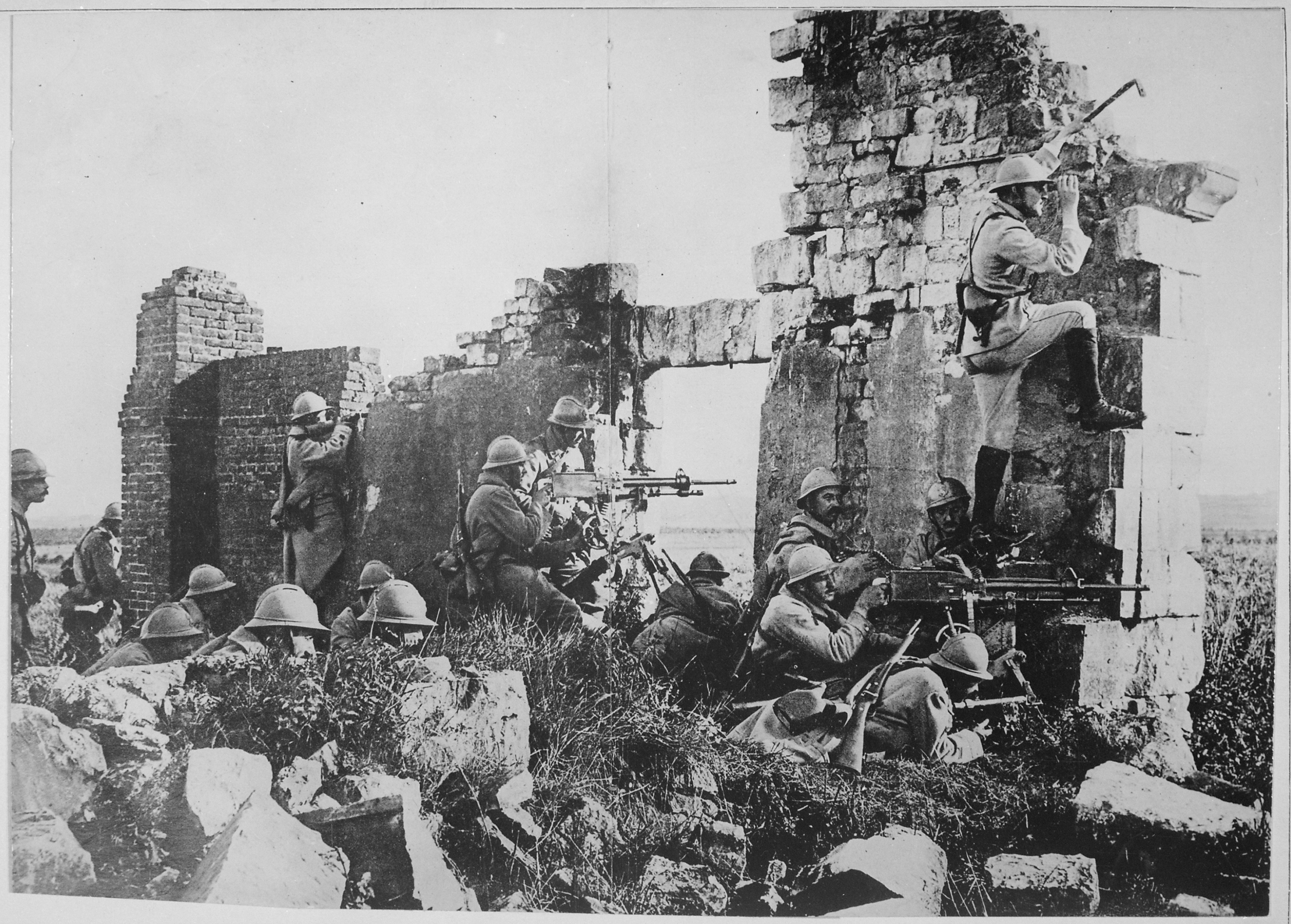
French machine gunners defend a ruined cathedral, late in the war

Infantry weapons for major powers were mainly bolt-action rifles, capable of firing ten or more rounds per minute. German soldiers carried the Gewehr 98 rifle in 8mm Mauser, the British carried the Short Magazine Lee–Enfield rifle, and the US military employed the M1903 Springfield and M1917 Enfield. Rifles with telescopic sights were used by snipers, and were first used by the Germans.

Machine guns were also used by great powers; both sides used the Maxim gun, a fully automatic belt-fed weapon, capable of long-term sustained use provided it was supplied to adequate amounts of ammunition and cooling water, and its French counterpart, the Hotchkiss M1914 machine gun. Their use in defense, combined with barbed wire obstacles, converted the expected mobile battlefield to a static one. The machine gun was useful in stationary battle but could not move easily through a battlefield, and therefore forced soldiers to face enemy machine guns without machine guns of their own.

Before the war, the French Army studied the question of a light machine gun but had made none for use. At the start of hostilities, France quickly turned an existing prototype (the "CS" for Chauchat and Sutter) into the lightweight Chauchat M1915 automatic rifle with a high rate of fire. Besides its use by the French, the first American units to arrive in France used it in 1917 and 1918. Hastily mass-manufactured under desperate wartime pressures, the weapon developed a reputation for unreliability.

Seeing the potential of such a weapon, the British Army adopted the American-designed Lewis gun chambered in .303 British. The Lewis gun was the first true light machine gun that could in theory be operated by one man, though in practice the bulky ammo pans required an entire section of men to keep the gun operating. The Lewis Gun was also used for marching fire, notably by the Australian Corps in the July 1918 Battle of Hamel. To serve the same purpose, the German Army adopted the MG08/15 which was impractically heavy at 48.5 pounds (22 kg) counting the water for cooling and one belt of ammunition holding 100 rounds. In 1918 the M1918 Browning Automatic Rifle (BAR) was introduced in the US military, the weapon was an "automatic rifle" and like the Chauchat was designed with the concept of walking fire in mind. The tactic was to be employed under conditions of limited field of fire and poor visibility such as advancing through woods.

Early submachine guns were much used near the end of the war, such as the MP-18.

The US military deployed combat shotguns, commonly known as trench guns. American troops used Winchester Models 1897 and 1912 short-barreled pump action shotguns loaded with 6 rounds containing antimony hardened 00 buckshot to clear enemy trenches. Pump actions can be fired rapidly, simply by working the slide when the trigger is held down, and when fighting within a trench, the shorter shotgun could be rapidly turned and fired in the opposite direction along the trench axis. The shotguns prompted a diplomatic protest from Germany, claiming the shotguns caused excessive injury, and that any U.S. combatants found in possession of them would be subject to execution. The U.S. rejected the claims, and threatened reprisals in kind if any of its troops were executed for possession of a shotgun.

=== Grenades ===
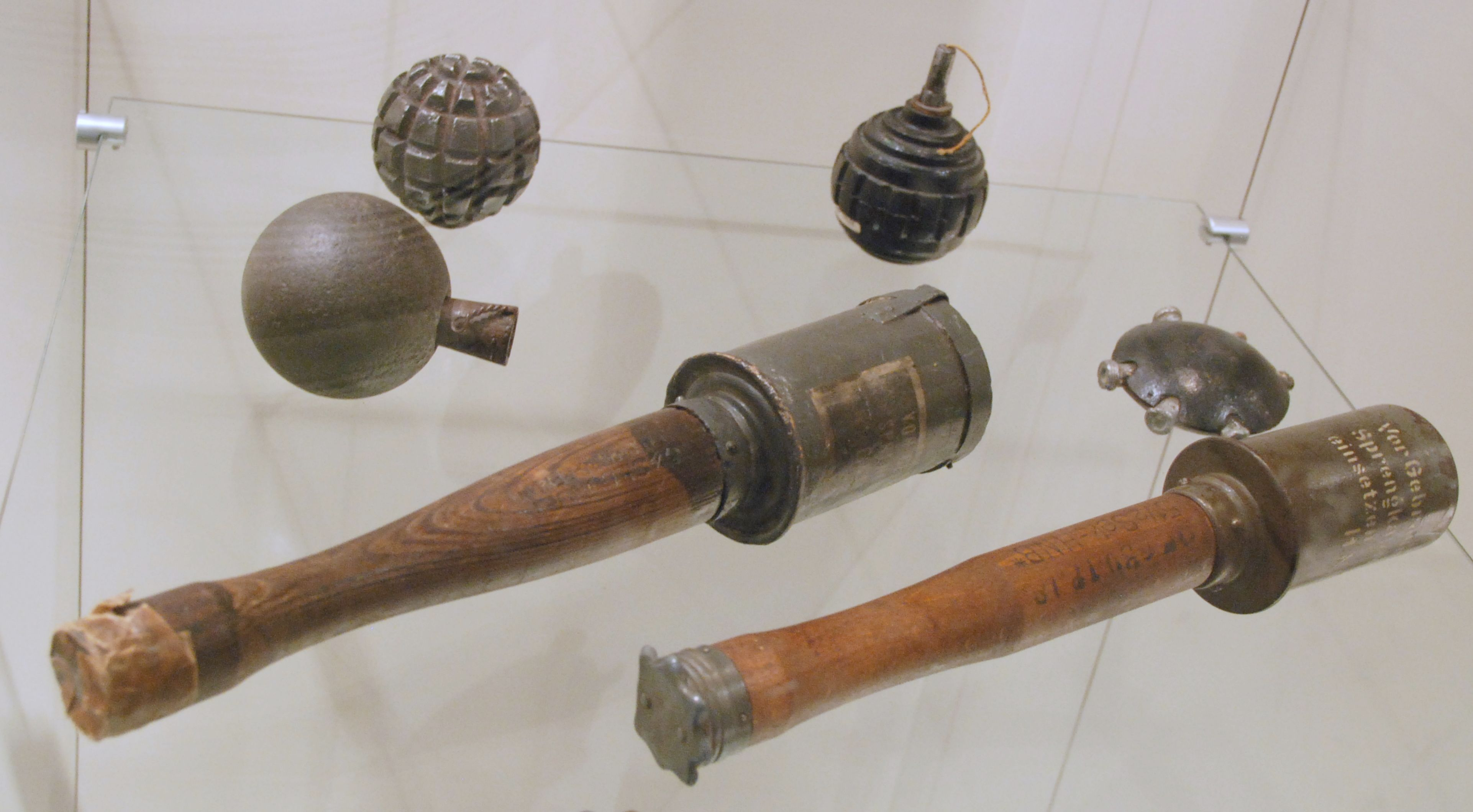
German grenades from the First World War, Verdun Memorial, Fleury-devant-Douaumont, France

Grenades proved to be effective weapons in the trenches. When the war started, grenades were few and poor. Hand grenades were used and improved throughout the war. Contact fuzes became less common, replaced by time fuzes.

The British entered the war with the long-handled impact detonating "Grenade, Hand No 1". This was replaced by the No. 15 "Ball Grenade" to partially overcome some of its inadequacies. An improvised hand grenade was developed in Australia for use by ANZAC troops called the Double Cylinder "jam tin" which consisted of a tin filled with dynamite or guncotton, packed round with scrap metal or stones. To ignite, at the top of the tin there was a Bickford safety fuse connecting the detonator, which was lit by either the user, or a second person. The "Mills bomb" (Grenade, Hand No. 5) was introduced in 1915 and would serve in its basic form in the British Army until the 1970s. Its improved fusing system relied on the soldier removing a pin and while holding down a lever on the side of the grenade. When the grenade was thrown the safety lever would automatically release, igniting the grenade's internal fuse which would burn down until the grenade detonated. The French would use the F1 defensive grenade.

The major grenades used in the beginning by the German Army were the impact-detonating "discus" or "oyster shell" bomb and the Mod 1913 black powder Kugelhandgranate with a friction-ignited time fuse. In 1915 Germany developed the much more effective Stielhandgranate, nicknamed "potato masher" for its shape, whose variants remained in use for decades; it used a timed fuse system similar to the Mills bomb.

Hand grenades were not the only attempt at projectile explosives for infantry. A rifle grenade was brought into the trenches to attack the enemy from a greater distance. The Hales rifle grenade got little attention from the British Army before the war began but, during the war, Germany showed great interest in this weapon. The resulting casualties for the Allies caused Britain to search for a new defense.

The Stokes mortar, a lightweight and very portable trench mortar with short tube and capable of indirect fire, was rapidly developed and widely imitated. Mechanical bomb throwers of lesser range were used in a similar fashion to fire upon the enemy from a safe distance within the trench.

The Sauterelle was a grenade launching Crossbow used before the Stokes mortar by French and British troops.

== Flamethrowers ==
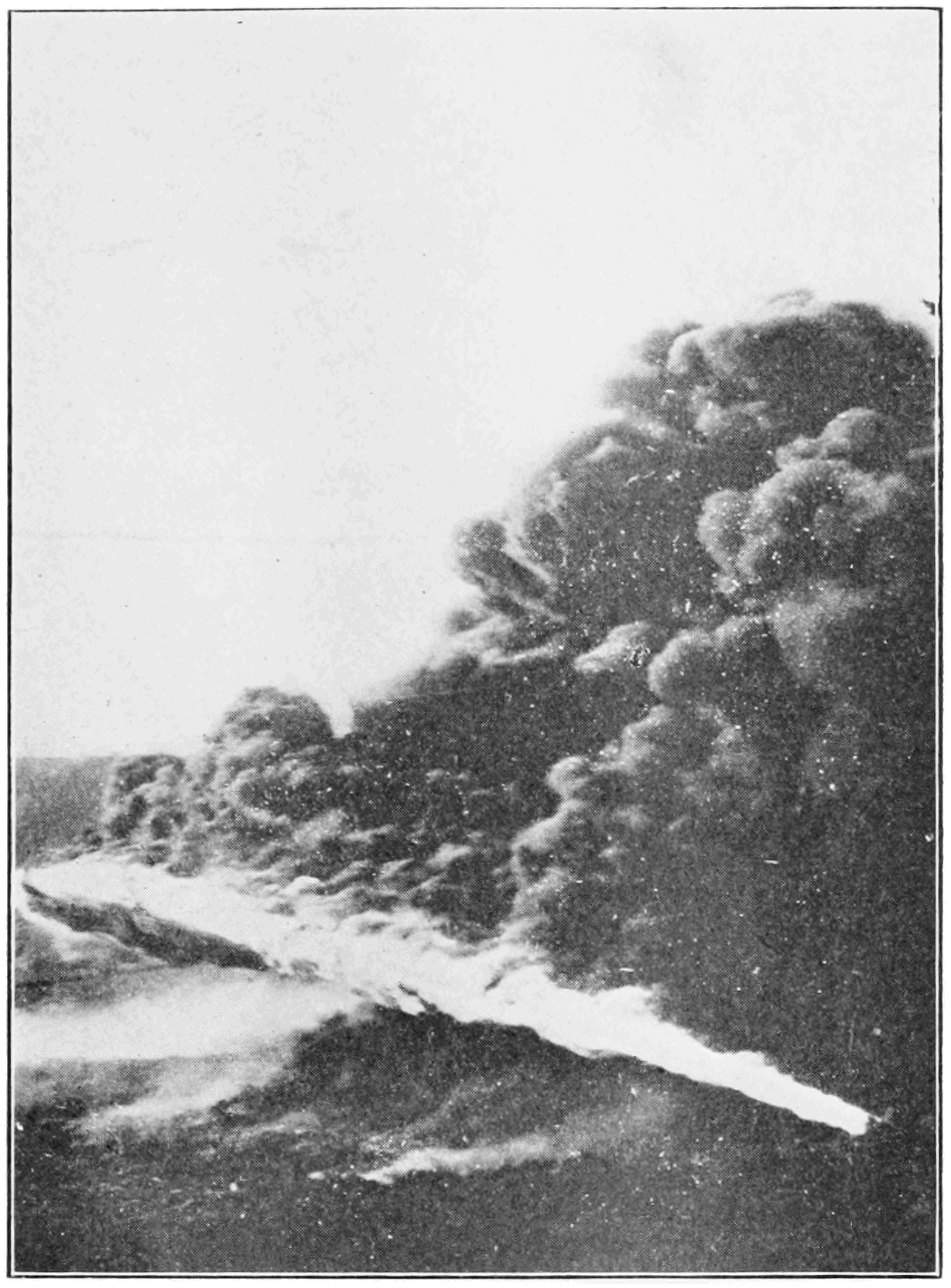
Defensive use

The Imperial German Army deployed flamethrowers (Flammenwerfer) on the Western Front attempting to flush out French or British soldiers from their trenches. Introduced in 1915, it was used with greatest effect during the Hooge battle of the Western Front on 30 July 1915. The German Army had two main types of flame throwers during the Great War: a small single person version called the Kleinflammenwerfer and a larger crew served configuration called the Grossflammenwerfer. In the latter, one soldier carried the fuel tank while another aimed the nozzle. Both the large and smaller versions of the flame-thrower were of limited use because their short range left the operator(s) exposed to small arms fire.

== See also ==
- List of German weapons of World War I
- Romanian military equipment of World War I
