= Clyde Model Dockyard =

Toy and model retailer in Glasgow, Scotland

Coordinates: 55.8589°N 4.2536°W

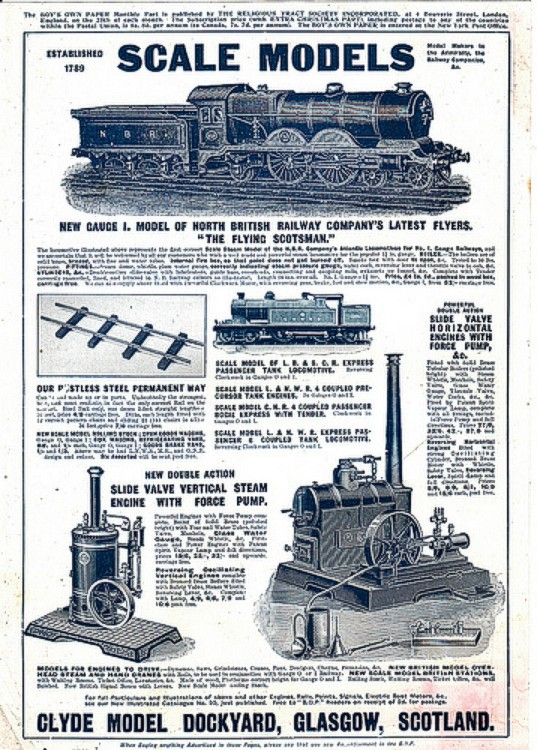
1914 advert

The Clyde Model Dockyard was a famous toy and model shop in Glasgow (not to be confused with the original Model Dockyard or Stevens Model Dockyard — different companies dealing in similar products). Established in 1789, it was located at 22–23 Argyll Arcade. The firm manufactured a range of boats and sailing yachts, but were probably best known for their 0 scale model railway stock and accessories.

Antoni Galletti had the premises at Argyle Street in 1829. Antoni Galletti began his career as a carver and gilder, and also produced scientific and mathematical instrument sets from his premises in Nelson Street, Glasgow. He and his sons became better known for optical instruments and spectacles. One of Antoni's sons, John Galletti, took over the shop from his father. John Galletti was succeeded by Andrew McKnight.

They initially made only nautical models for the Admiralty, but by the late 19th century had expanded their business to commercial toy steam engines and railway locomotives. These were largely bought from English and French manufacturers, although the company rarely admitted to the fact. By the first years of the twentieth century the company could be ranked alongside Gamages of London in its retailing of mechanical metal toys, particularly shipping and rail related, and it issued a substantial range of seasonal catalogues. While most products offered in these were standard items by the great German makers such as Carette, Schoenner and Märklin, Clyde did commission bespoke products from the famous Nürnberg maker Gebrüder Bing, alongside others by a number of lesser-known Birmingham makers, such as Carson, mainly in gauge III (2.5 inches).

There is no evidence of the company building any of its own railway products, but they did super-detail items in a workshop based in a converted drawing-room flat in Argyll Street. On the other hand, this workshop did manufacture wooden-hulled model boats to various levels. After the Great War, the company became a major agent for Hornby 0 gauge trains and also took an interest in a range of toy locomotives made by Bar Knight of Glasgow. It continued to retail German products and even some American-made items.

Although it is the inter-war period that is remembered with most fond nostalgia, it was really a shadow of the quality the company aspired to pre 1914. However, Clyde continued to be an important focal point of Scottish model-making and it was active in encouraging amateur scratch-builders in the 1930s, offering substantial trophies for competition, alongside its retailing activities — it had always held large stocks of fittings and fixtures for model makers and this was an important part of its business. Clyde continued to be active after the Second World War in 00 gauge trains, sailing yachts, diecast cars, steam toys and model aircraft materials, for which the shop was one of three in central Glasgow from which balsa wood and related materials were available up to the 1970s; the Clyde Model Dockyard Trophy was competed for annually amongst aeromodellers. Like Gamages, the shop became a victim of changing tastes and retail patterns in the 1960s, finally closing down in the early 1970s.

In honour of the nostalgic place it has in the minds of many Scots, a full-scale re-creation of its frontage was built as part of the "1930s Glasgow Street" in the Glasgow Museum of Transport when it was rebuilt at Kelvin Hall. It was again re-re-created in the new Riverside Museum on Clydeside.

The rights to the Clyde Model Dockyard name have since been acquired and the business relaunched in late 2024 with a range of marine related scale models.
