= Model Dockyard (company) =

- Industry: Toys and models
- Founded: 1774 Claimed, but not actually established until the early 1860s
- Headquarters: Fleet Street, London, UK
- Area served: Worldwide
- Products: Toys and models

Model Dockyard was a company which made and sold Models, toys and parts for modellers (not to be confused with the Stevens Model Dockyard or Clyde Model Dockyard - later companies dealing in similar products). Although it claimed to be established in 1774, it did not actually exist as 'The Model Dockyard' until the 1860s, it was located in Fleet Street, London.

Edwin Bell’s business began when he took over from a Henry William A Farley, who set up a ‘Toy and Fancy Repository’ at 31 Fleet Street in 1840, having moved there from 25 Ludgate Street. For a few years in the mid-1840s his business also acted as a Post Office Receiving House (in the early days of the penny post). In 1854 he began to call himself a toy-dealer and naval modeller and only three years later, in 1857, his business passed on to Edwin Bell. Over the next seven years Bell turned it from a toy and fancy repository to ‘The Model Dockyard’, Bell consistently described himself as a ‘ship modeller’ in the trade directories. In this he was rather similar to William Stevens and, like Stevens, the evidence points to him beginning to supply brass steam locos and engines, in addition to ship models, sometime in the 1860s, with the first documentary evidence The Model Dockyard Handy Book being published in the mid-1860s (second edition 1867). In this, Bell claims that his business is the only one of its kind in the country; therefore was writing for the first edition before Stevens’ expanded business in Aldgate Street made its mark.The Model Dockyard Handy Book is only ‘edited’ by Bell, suggesting that a lot of the content was written by others. While its focus is on ship modelling, with steam engines coming second, it also covers a lot of other sports and pastimes. By the time of the 1872 edition the range of locomotives had expanded to seven. A question remains as to what was in-house and what bought-in? Bell seems only to have been second only to William Wilson in commercial brass loco manufacture in London. Other than producing what seems to be the first publication in which toy locomotives are detailed for the retail trade, Bell’s choice of business name, reflecting his interest in ship models, was probably his most significant contribution to toy retailing history, almost immediately being taken up by Stevens and, later, Clyde, amongst others. In 1886 The Model Dockyard was taken over by John Bateman. Under Bateman, The Model Dockyard published an extensive catalogue in 1889, which has been reprinted. Bateman continued in business as a 'Mechanical Engineer' until well into the 20th century, although 'The Model Dockyard' seems to have become defunct in the 1890s.

== Products ==
Model Dockyard's products included model sailing boats and hulls, steam boats, boat fittings, stationary steam engines, marine engines, steam cranes, traction engines, steam fire engines, railway locomotives, railway rolling stock, track, lineside accessories, steam engine parts, boilers, and similar items.

== Company name ==
The name of the company implies that they may initially have supplied ship models to the Admiralty, like Clyde Model Dockyard and Stevens Model Dockyard.
