= Stevens Model Dockyard =

Historical hobbyist shop

Stevens's Model Dockyard
- Industry: Toys and models
- Founded: 1843
- Founder: W. Stevens
- Headquarters: Aldgate, London, UK
- Area served: Worldwide
- Products: Toys and models

Stevens's Model Dockyard was a company which made and sold models, toys and parts for modellers (not to be confused with the original Model Dockyard or Clyde Model Dockyard - different companies dealing in similar products). Established 1843, it was located in Aldgate, London.

== Products ==
Stevens Model Dockyard was as much a retailer as a maker and large numbers of items are now claimed to be by the company that were only retailed by them, rather than made by them. There is little evidence of what exactly they made prior to 1900, but certainly ship models, fittings and engines, spirit fired steam locomotives, wooden rolling stock and brass-on-mahogany rail, stationary engines and components. Their 20th century catalogues differentiate 'our own make' from 'British made' (i.e. items retailed and made in the UK, but not be Stevens) and they do not mention the origin of those items made by concerns outside of the UK. Stevens' own make items are best quality, the steam engines and locomotives usually finished in lacquered brass, like optical equipment. Their catalogues included a huge range of items by other makers including model sailing boats and hulls, steam boats, boat fittings, stationary steam engines, machine tools, marine engines, railway locomotives, railway rolling stock, track, lineside accessories, steam engine parts, clockwork motors, hydraulic motors, boilers, electric motors, electrical novelties, telegraphs, electrical accessories, optical instruments and books. They also sold Meccano, Klipit and other branded items.

== Company name ==
William Stevens claimed he first set up on own account in 1843, but he does not appear in London directories until 1848. When he does he has nothing to do with models. Rather, he was a ‘news vendor’ or ‘news agent’ trading from Trinity Square in the city. In 1857 he first lists himself as a ‘news agent & ship modeller’. Only when he moved to 22 Aldgate in 1865 did he cease his news agency to focus on ship models alone. Three years later, in 1868, he finally expanded into ‘steam engines and all the separate parts’. It was only then that ‘Stevens Model Dockyard’ was fully established. The company name was slightly adapted from 'The Model Dockyard' a business established earlier in the 1860s by Edwin Bell.
