= Leach trench catapult =

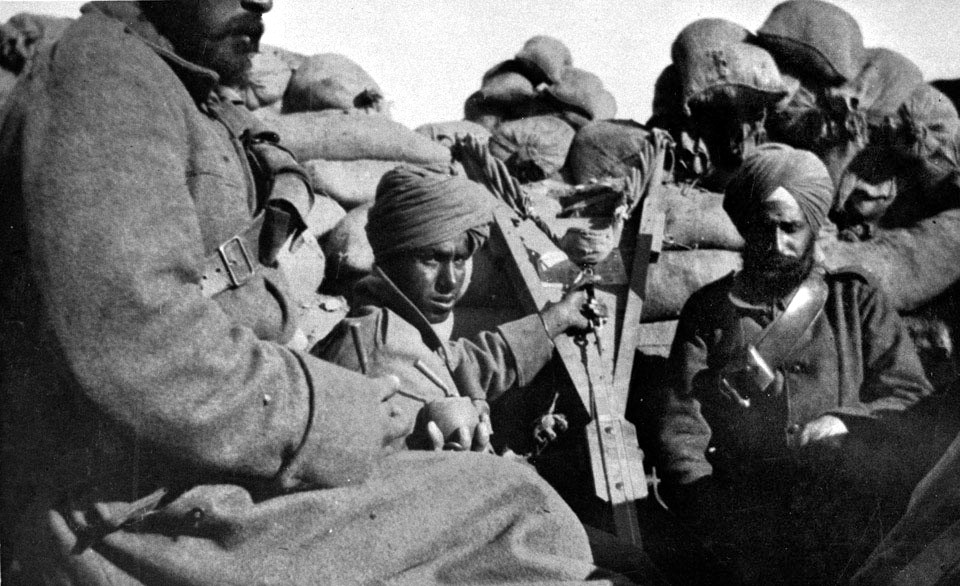
- 29th Indian Brigade with Leach catapult at Gallipoli, 1915
- Type: Catapult
- Place of origin: United Kingdom

Service history
- In service: 1915–1916
- Used by: United Kingdom
- Wars: World War I

Production history
- Designer: Claude Pemberton Leach
- Designed: 1915
- Manufacturer: Gamages
- Unit cost: £6 17s 6d
- Produced: March–October 1915
- No. built: 152

Specifications
- Effective firing range: 200 yd (180 m)

The Leach trench catapult (sometimes called a Leach-Gamage catapult) was a bomb-throwing catapult used by the British Army on the Western Front during World War I. It was designed to throw a 2 lb (0.91 kg) projectile in a high trajectory into enemy trenches. Although called a catapult, it was effectively a combination crossbow and slingshot. It was invented by Claude Pemberton Leach as an answer to the German Wurfmaschine, a spring-powered device for propelling a hand grenade about 200 m (220 yd).

The design was a Y-shaped frame with natural rubber bands pulled taut by a windlass and held in position by a hook release. They were manufactured by the Gamages department store in Central London and cost £6 17s 6d to make. In tests, the Leach catapult could propel a golf ball 200 yd (180 m), and a cricket ball or Mills bomb 120–150 yd (110–140 m). However, with new rubbers it was reported to be able to propel a jam tin grenade or No. 15 ball grenade up to 200 yd (180 m).

The first was produced in March 1915 and by October of that year over 150 had been made. Twenty were allocated to each division. From the end of 1915 they were replaced by the French-made Sauterelle grenade launcher, and, in 1916, by the 2-inch medium trench mortar and Stokes mortar.

Copies of the Leach catapult, made locally by the Royal Engineers, were used in the Gallipoli Campaign.
