= Gamages =

Former department store in London

Coordinates: 51.5176°N 0.1209°W

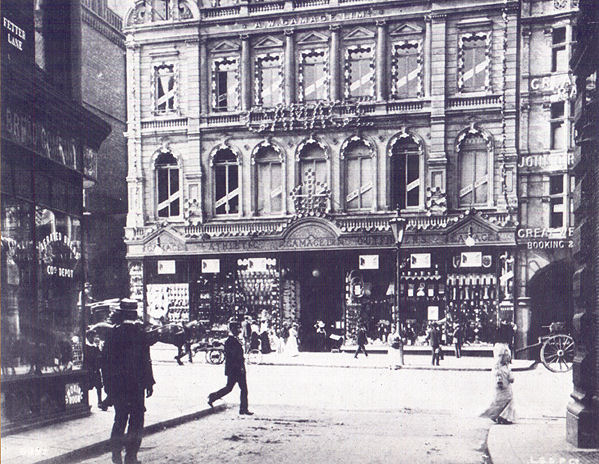
Gamages in the late 19th century

Gamages was a department store in Holborn, London. Trading between 1878 and 1972, it was particularly well known for its toy and hardware departments.

== History ==
Gamages began life in 1878 in a rented watch repair shop and, after quickly becoming a success amongst its customers, was established as a London institution. It was founded by Albert Walter Gamage, who soon bought out his partner, Frank Spain. In time it grew large enough to take up most of the block in which it was situated, it was unusual in that its premises were away from the main Oxford Street shopping area, being at 118–126 Holborn, close to Holborn Circus, on the edge of the City of London . Gamages also ran a successful mail-order business.

Gamages stocked a wide range of toys and produced a catalogue before Christmas. One of the store's main attractions was a large model railway which alternated between a day and night scene by the use of lighting. The railway was provided by a man called Bertram Otto who was German by birth. It received many thousands of visitors every Christmas.

Gamages had a substantial hardware department on the ground floor which included specialist motor parts and car seat cover sections. There was a photographic department, and camping, pets, toys and sporting departments, the latter selling shotguns. The toy department was extensive and there were substantial fashion, furniture and carpeting departments and in later years a small food supermarket.

In 1928 Gamages signed a lease for 489–497 Oxford Street from the Duke of Westminster, and set about building a new store with residential accommodation under architects C. S. and E. M. Joseph, with input from the Duke's chosen architect for his estate, Sir Edwin Lutyens. A new company was set up, Gamages (West End) Limited, for the expansion with 500,000 £1 shares sold to the public. The store opened in 1930, and the architectural correspondent of The Times said that the "skilful manner of [Lutyens'] 'stone binding of the brick mass' is very apparent". The store failed as a business and was closed just eight months later, with the building being auctioned off.

A report of the auction of Gamages Department Store (including its 41 flats) appeared in The Times on 15 July 1931. Mr W. S. Edgson of Hillier Parker May & Rowden conducted the auction, who said it was "regrettable the property had to be put onto the market after only a few months of trading." The report said the premises "had a working area, excluding staircases, of 210,000 square feet. The site was practically self-contained with a frontage of 318 feet to Oxford Street, long frontages to Park Street and North Row, and a ground area of 56,800 square feet... The agreement for the lease was for £30,000 a year from 1932. It might (said Mr Edgson) seem a high ground rent, but, being only 11s. a foot, it was extremely low for Oxford-street." There was no response to an opening offer of £600,000, or of £500,000, "half of what the building cost". The premises was withdrawn from sale at £330,000. The building was eventually bought by C&A.

During World War I, Gamages manufactured the Leach trench catapult.

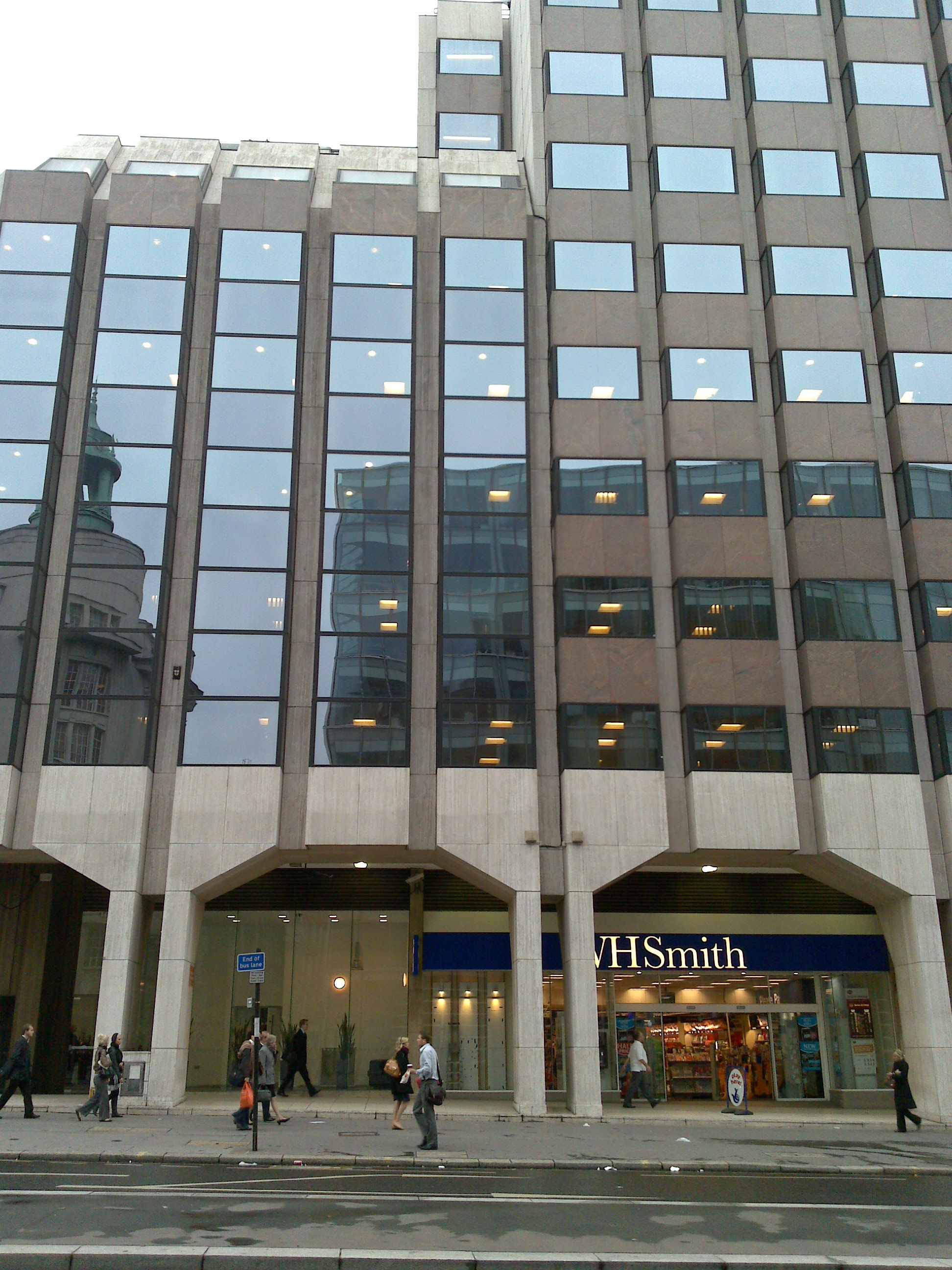
The site in 2009

Gamages was an extremely successful and profitable store. In 1968 a second store was opened in the Liberty Shopping Centre in Romford, Essex. This had a relatively short life as the whole company was taken over by Jeffrey Sterling's Sterling Guarantee Trust in 1970 and the Romford site was sold off to British Home Stores in 1971. The Holborn site closed in March 1972 and there is now no trace of the store to be seen. Gamages reopened in the old Waring & Gillows store in Oxford Street but this venture was short-lived and closed in 1972.

== In popular culture ==
In London Belongs to Me by Norman Collins, Connie visits Gamages to buy a new cage for her beloved canary, Duke.

In an episode of the BBC sitcom Porridge titled 'Heartbreak Hotel', Fletcher tells his daughter how, at the time of her conception, her mother had 'a nice steady job in the hardware department at Gamages'.

In an episode of the LWT TV drama Poirot titled 'The Yellow Iris', Arthur Hastings reads to Poirot from the Daily Express newspaper. A prominent advertisement for Gamages department store promoting a 'great sale of furniture at lowest cash prices' can be seen.

In an episode of the Granada TV crime drama The Memoirs of Sherlock Holmes titled 'The Cardboard Box', Mrs Hudson advises Sherlock Holmes to buy Dr Watson's Christmas present at Gamages. Later, we see Holmes arrive with a parcel with the Gamages label. Finally, the gift is revealed to be a poncho.

David Jason wrote in his book The Twelve Dels of Christmas that the Captain Fantastic segment of the 1968 Christmas episode of Do Not Adjust Your Set was filmed at Gamages.
