= Sauterelle =

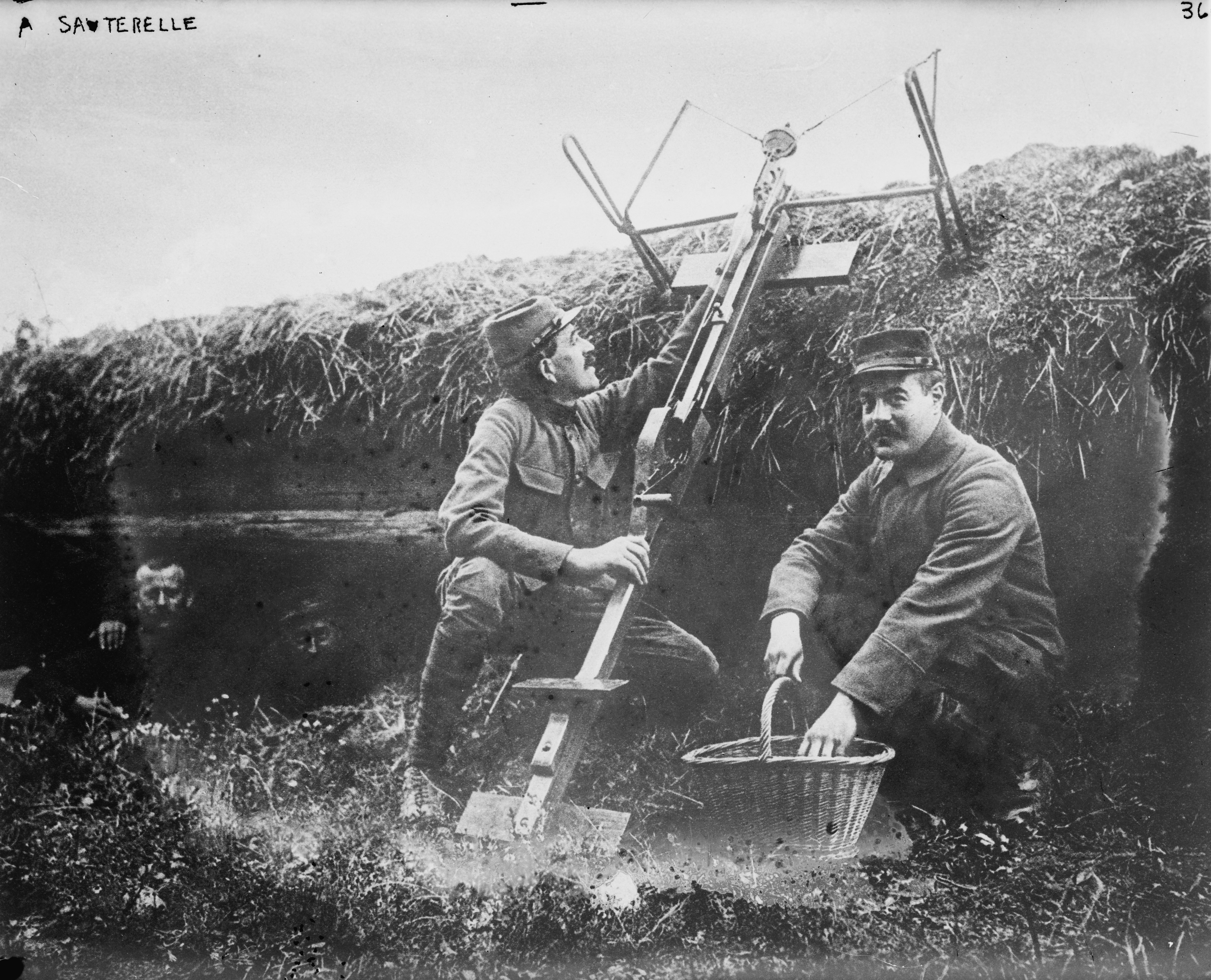
- French soldiers with a Sauterelle, circe 1915
- Type: Crossbow
- Place of origin: France

Service history
- In service: 1915–1916
- Used by: France, United Kingdom
- Wars: World War I

Production history
- Produced: 1915-1916

Specifications
- Mass: 24 kg (53 lb)
- Crew: 2
- Effective firing range: 110–140 m (120–150 yd)

The Arbalète sauterelle type A, or simply Sauterelle ([so.tʁɛl] French for grasshopper), was a bomb-throwing crossbow used by French and British forces on the Western Front during World War I. It was designed to throw a hand grenade in a high trajectory into enemy trenches. It was initially dismissed by the French Army but General Henri Berthelot thought it had practical value.

It was lighter and more portable than the Leach Trench Catapult, but less powerful. It weighed 24 kg (53 lb) and could throw an F1 grenade or Mills bomb 110–140 m (120–150 yd).

The Sauterelle replaced the Leach Catapult in British service until they were replaced in 1916 by the 2 inch Medium Trench Mortar and Stokes mortar.
