= No. 15 ball grenade =

No. 15 "Ball Grenade"
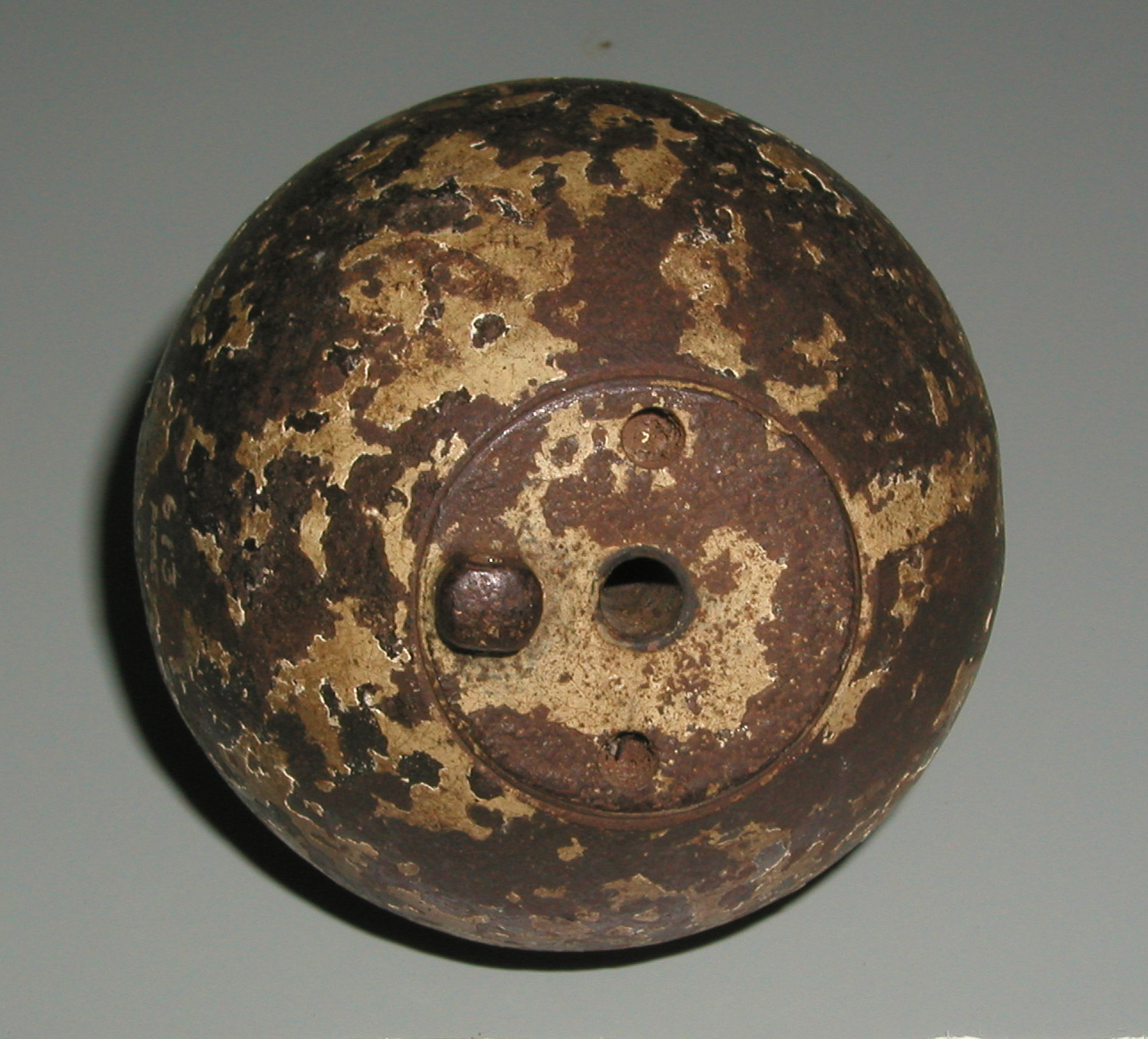
- A No. 15 "cricket ball" grenade
- Type: Time-fused grenade
- Place of origin: United Kingdom

Service history
- In service: 1915
- Used by: United Kingdom
- Wars: World War I

Production history
- Designed: 1915
- Produced: 1915

Specifications
- Mass: 1 lb 11 1/2 oz (780 g)
- Diameter: 3 in (76 mm) diameter
- Filling: Ammonal
- Filling weight: 5 1/2 oz (160 g)
- Detonation mechanism: Timed friction fuse

The No. 15 ball grenade, also referred to as hand/catapult/spring gun, ball grenade, or by ANZACs as the cricket ball grenade, was a grenade used by the British during World War I.

== Overview ==
The No. 15 was a cast iron grenade, with a flattened top with a hole for the fuse to be inserted. This time-fused grenade was fragmented by internal grooves. Originally these grenades contained gunpowder and later, ammonal.

To light the grenade, the user had to remove a covering that was on the fuse, then strike an external Brock matchhead igniter against the fuse.

There were two types of fuses available; the five-second and the nine-second. The former was intended for throwing, while the latter was intended for catapults.

== History ==
The No. 15 was one of the interim grenades created due to problems associated with the No. 1 grenade which was intended for use in frontline service in the Middle Eastern Campaign.

First introduced in July 1915, the No. 15 Grenade was used during the Battle of Loos and fighting in the Middle Eastern theatre of World War I, at the Dardanelles. The No. 15 was noted to be easily mass-produced. By August 1915, more than 200,000 No. 15s were created per week and by mid November 1915, there were 500,000 per week.

However the No. 15 did prove problematic, the explosive charge was too large, which created smaller-than-expected fragmentation when the grenade exploded. In addition, it was also considered too large to throw because of its 3-inch (76 mm) circumference. These problems were remedied with the creation of the No. 16 'oval grenade'.

=== Battle of Loos ===
The No. 15 was first widely used in the Battle of Loos. Tacticians envisioned that the No. 15 would be useful in breaching German defenses and trench clearing. It was used because production of the No. 5 "Mills bomb" was running seriously behind planned figures, and not enough of them could be supplied before the start of the Loos campaign.

When the Battle for Loos started, the No. 15 was beset with problems, in particular the damp conditions encountered made the fuse almost useless. It was estimated that approximately 18 out of 20 No. 15s failed to ignite due to inoperative fuses.

On November 20, 1915, the No. 15 and its cousin, the No. 16, were withdrawn from France and were replaced with the No. 5 'Mills bomb'.

== Variants ==
=== No. 16 'oval grenade' ===
The No. 16 was essentially an improved version of the No. 15. Instead of a ball shape, it had an oval shape. which proved easier to hold. It was also filled with less explosive charge. The No. 16 was planned to completely replace the No. 15, but the defeat at Loos caused both models to be withdrawn from service, both displaying the same fuse issue.
