= Abar =

Abar may refer to:

- Abar (album), by Bangladeshi rock band Black
- Abar, the First Black Superman, a film
- Abar (queen), a Nubian queen dated to the Twenty-fifth Dynasty of Egypt
- Abar language

== People with the surname ==
- Nicole Abar (born 1959), French footballer
- Saber Abar (born 1984), Iranian actor and theater director
