= List of Légion d'honneur recipients by name (A) =

The French government gives out the Legion of Honour awards, to both French and foreign nationals, based on a recipient's exemplary services rendered to France, or to the causes supported by France. This award is divided into five distinct categories (in ascending order), i.e. three ranks: Knight, Officer, Commander, and two titles: Grand Officer and Grand Cross. Knight is the most common and is awarded for either at least 20 years of public service or acts of military or civil bravery. The rest of the categories have a quota for the number of years of service in the category below before they can be awarded. The Officer rank requires a minimum of eight years as a Knight, and the Commander, the highest civilian category for a non-French citizen, requires a minimum of five years as an Officer. The Grand Officer and the Grand Cross are awarded only to French citizens, and each requires three years' service in their respective immediately lower rank. The awards are traditionally published and promoted on 14 July.

The following is a non-exhaustive list of recipients of the Legion of Honour awards, since the first ceremony in May 1803. 2,550 individuals can be awarded the insignia every year. The total number of awards is close to 1 million (estimated at 900,000 in 2021, including over 3,000 Grand Cross recipients), with some 92,000 recipients alive today. Only until 2008 was gender parity achieved among the yearly list of recipients, with the total number of women recipients since the award's establishment being only 59 at the end of the second French empire and only 26,000 in 2021.

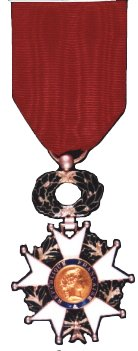

Recipient	Dates (birth–death)	General work & reason for the recognition	Award category (date)
Nils Waltersen Aasen	1878–1925	A Norwegian arms inventor, known for developing the modern hand grenade and land mine.	Knight (1915)
Nicole Abar	1959–present	A former footballer.	Knight (July 13 2016)
Claudio Abbado	1933–2014	Italian conductor	Knight (TBA); Officer (TBA); Commander (TBA); Grand Officer (TBA); Grand Cross (1986)
Louise Abbéma	1853–1927	French painter, sculptor, and designer of the Belle Époque.	Knight (1906)
Antoine Samuel Adam-Salomon	1818–1881	French sculptor and photographer	Knight (decree: 9 August 1870)
Isabelle Adjani	1955–present	French actress and singer of Algerian and German descent. Recognised for her contribution to the arts.	Knight (14 July 2010)
Arnaud de Borchgrave	1926–2015	Belgian-American journalist who specialized in international politics.	Knight (July 2014)
Alfred Agache	1843–1915	French academic painter	Knight (decree: 10 August 1899; declaration: 24 August 1899); Officer (decree: 16 May 1910; declaration: 25 June 1910)
Akihito	1933–present	Emperor of Japan (125th). Known for presiding over the Heisei era, an expression of achieving peace worldwide.	Knight (TBA); Officer (TBA); Commander (TBA); Grand Officer (TBA); Grand Cross (TBA)
Ekrem Akurgal	1911–2002	Turkish archaeologist	Knight (TBA); Officer (1987)
Azzedine Alaïa (turned down)	1935–2017	Tunisian couturier and shoe designer	Knight (2008) .
Pierre Albaladejo	1933–present	French rugby union player	Knight (TBA); Officer (TBA)
Albert II, Prince of Monaco	1958–present	Prince of Monaco	Knight (TBA); Officer (TBA); Commander (TBA); Grand Officer (TBA); Grand Cross (8 November 2005)
Helene Aldwinckle	1920–2020	Bletchley Park codebreaker (World War II)	Knight (Ceremony: 19 July 2019)
Jean Alesi	1964–present	French former Formula 1 driver	Knight (2006)
Alexander I of Yugoslavia			
Harold Alexander, 1st Earl Alexander of Tunis			
Édouard Alexandre	1824–1888	French organ inventor and manufacturer	Knight (1860)
Hossein Alizâdeh			
Jean Francois Allard	1785–1839	French soldier and adventurer	Knight (decree: 27 February 1814); Officer (decree: 15 November 1832); Commander (decree: 20 October 1835)
Henry Allingham			
Auguste Jean Ameil			
Dimitri Amilakhvari			
Jacques Ancel			
Władysław Anders			
Alfred Anderson			
Colonel (later Brigadier General) AT Anderson			
Alexander E Anderson USS General A. E. Anderson (AP-111)			
Constantine Andreou		Sculptor & painter	
Charles Paget, 6th Marquess of Anglesey			
Albert Anker			
Gregory Annenberg Weingarten			
Regina Annenberg Weingarten			
David Annoussamy			Nominated: 2006; Received: 2007
Jacques Anquetil			
Admiral Mohammad Anwar Mohammad Nor			
Chief of Defence Force of Malaysia (2007)			
Senedu Araya-Sellassie		Founder of Vision on Africa, VoA	
Geoffrey Arbuthnot			
Denys Arcand			
Alphonse Areola		World Cup winning footballer	
Mohammed Arkoun			
Elizabeth Arden			
Dombasle Arielle	1953–present	French actress, singer, producer	
Giorgio Armani	1934–2025	Italian fashion designer	
Edwin Howard Armstrong			
Gladys Arnold			
Henry "Hap" Arnold			
Yann Arthus-Bertrand		Photographer, journalist, reporter and environmentalist	
Bahram Aryana	1906–1985	Former Chief of Staff of the Shah's Armed Forces	Grand Officier (TBA)
Sir Frederick Ashton		Founding choreographer of The Royal Ballet	
Szymon Askenazy			
Olivar Asselin			
Celal Atik			
Vera Atkins			
Charley Attali	1930-2006	Israeli aerospace engineer, in charge of the Diamant	
Richard Attenborough			
Pierre Augereau			
Aung San Suu Kyi			
Jacqueline Auriol			
Charles Aznavour			

== See also ==
- Legion of Honour
- List of Legion of Honour recipients by name
- List of foreign recipients of Legion of Honour by name
- List of foreign recipients of the Legion of Honour by country
- List of British recipients of the Legion of Honour for the Crimean War
- Legion of Honour Museum
- Ribbons of the French military and civil awards
- War Cross (France)
