= Alfred Agache (painter) =

French painter (1843–1915)

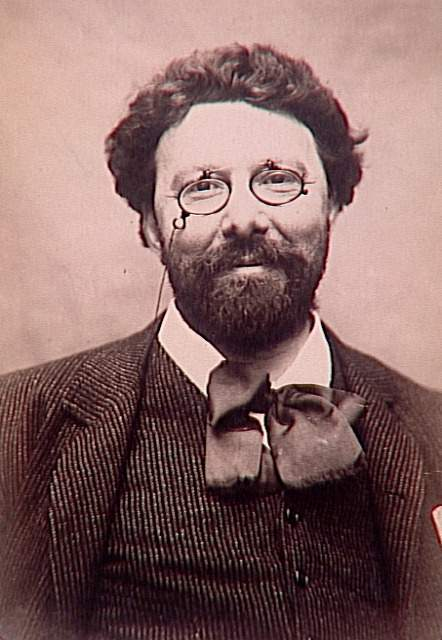
- Alfred Agache, c. 1890 – 1900
- Born: 29 August 1843; Lille, France
- Died: 15 September 1915 (aged 72); Lille, France
- Occupation: Painter
- Known for: portraits and allegorical paintings
- Style: Academic art
- Awards: Legion of Honour - Officer (1910)

Alfred-Pierre Joseph Agache (French: [alfʁɛd aɡaʃ]; 29 August 1843 – 15 September 1915), also known simply as Alfred Agache, was a French academic painter.

== Biography ==
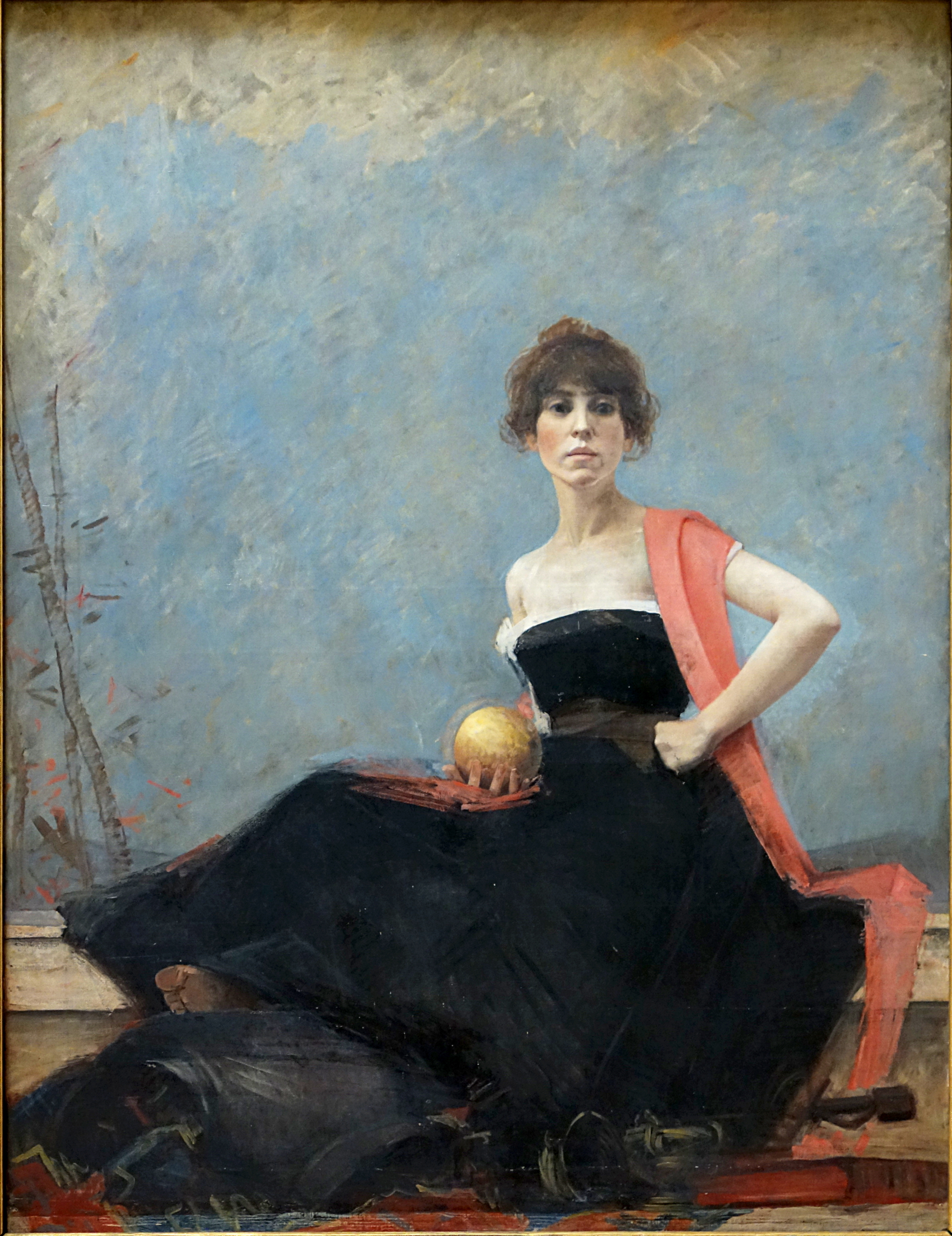
"Vanity"

Little is known of Agache's life. He was born in Lille, France, and exhibited his work frequently in Paris. He seems to have specialized in portraits and large-scale allegorical paintings. He was a member of the Société des Artistes Français, and won a third-class medal in 1885 for his work. He may have been friends with American painter James Abbott McNeill Whistler and French writer Auguste Angellier; the latter dedicated a book to him around 1893. A portrait of his wife was painted by Aimé Morot.

== Awards ==
At the 1889 Paris Exposition Universelle he was decorated by a silver medal, and then a gold medal during the subsequent 1893 Chicago World's Columbian Exposition, where two of his pieces, "Vanity" and "The Annunciation", were exhibited.

By decree on 10 August 1899 (declaration: 24 August 1899), he was awarded a knighthood in France's Legion of Honour, which was upgraded to the rank of officer by decree on 16 May 1910 (declaration: 25 June 1910).

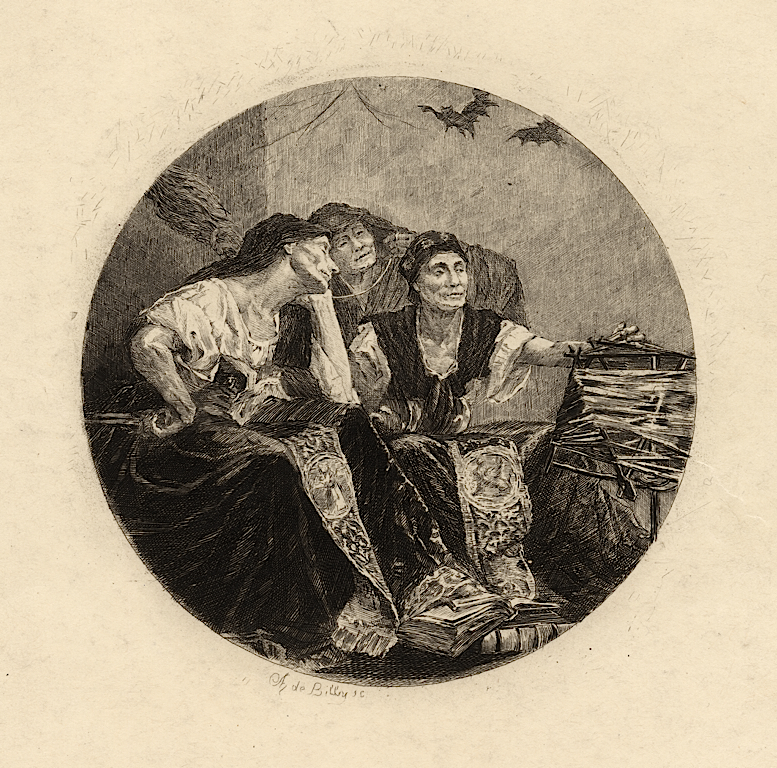
Charles de Billy after Alfred-Pierre Agache, Untitled (The Three Fates), n.d., etching, Department of Image Collections, National Gallery of Art Library, Washington, DC

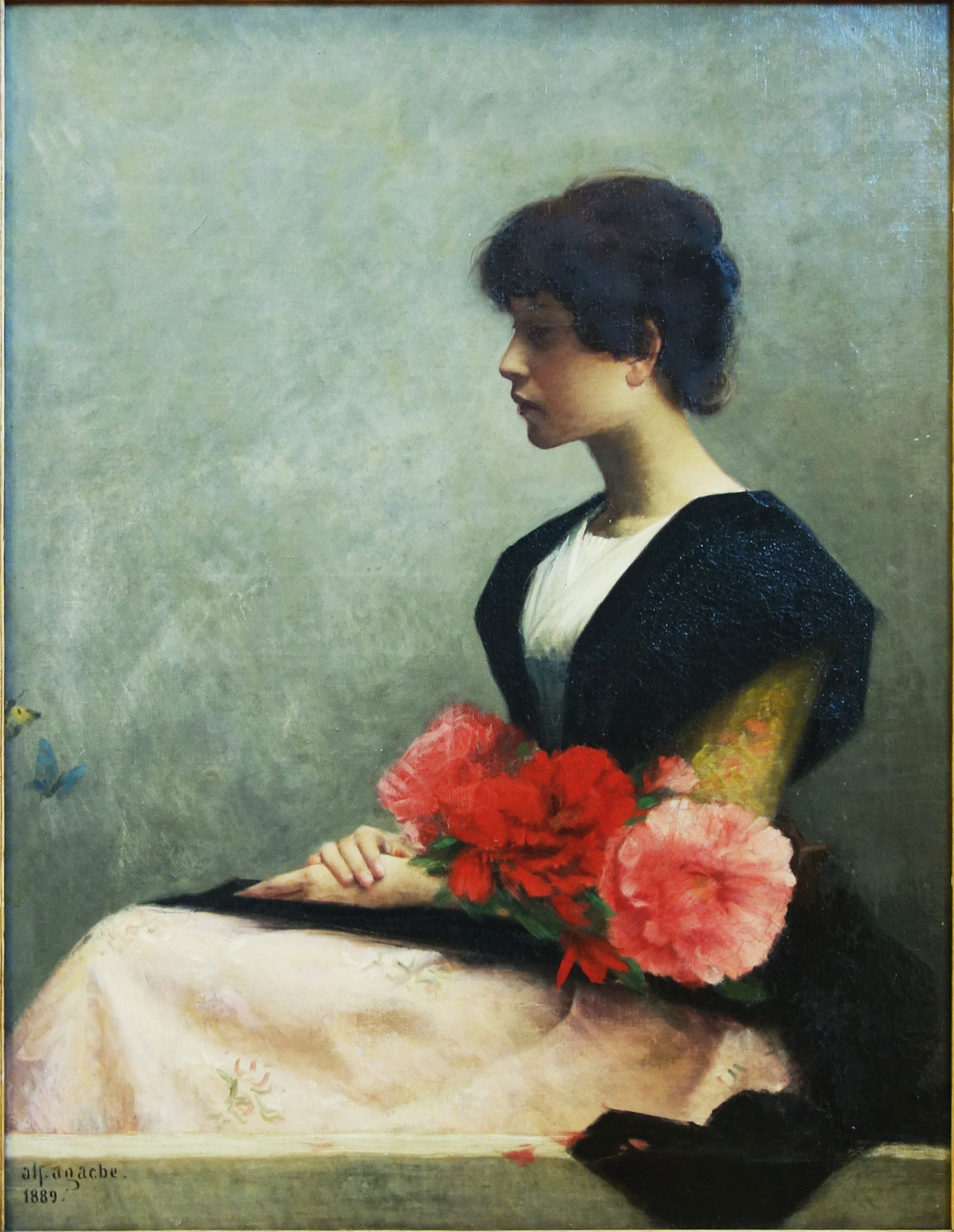
"Jeune femme assise tenant des fleurs dans les bras" (Young woman with flowers), Palais des Beaux-Arts de Lille

== Death ==
He died in Lille in 1915.

== "L'Épée" ==
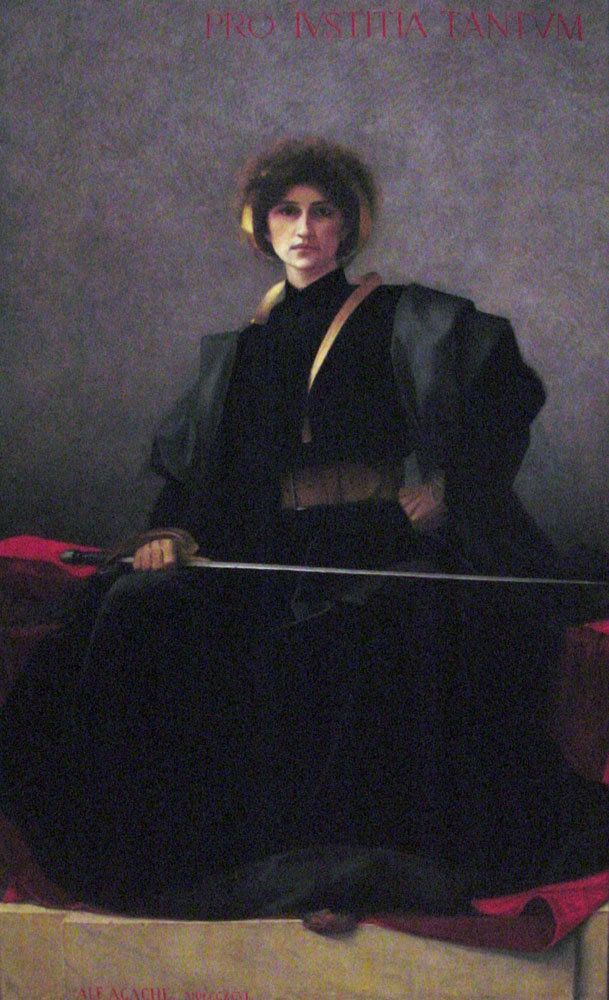
Alfred Agache, "L'Épée" (The Sword) 1896, Art Gallery of Ontario

One of these paintings, L'Épée (French, "The Sword"), painted in 1896, includes the Latin phrase "PRO IUSTITIA TANTUM" ("On behalf of Justice Only") to represent that violence should be used only by Justice. It was displayed at the Paris Salon that year. It was purchased by the Canadian National Exhibition (CNE) in 1916 from an exhibition of paintings that were currently on loan from France. Following the CNE's decision in 1938 to cease collecting and exhibiting European art, the painting (with other French works) was loaned to the Art Gallery of Ontario (AGO); in the mid-1960s these works were formally donated to the AGO. This painting remained in the AGO's vaults until the early 1990s; it was cleaned and restored and displayed in the AGO's Fudger Gallery.

In June 2005, "L'Épée" was included in an exhibition called "Favourites: Your Choices from Our Collection", which displayed works based on votes from the general public from the previous four months.

== Partial list of works ==
- "Portrait de femme agée" ("Portrait of an old woman"), 1880
- "Les parques"" ("The Fates"), 1882
- "Portrait de jeune femme" ("Portrait of a young woman"), 1883
- "L'Annonciation" ("The Annunciation"), 1885
- "Vanité" ("Vanity"), 1885
- "La roue de la Fortune" ("Wheel of Fortune"), 1885
- "Enigme" ("Enigma"), 1888, oil on canvas
- "La Diseuse de bonne aventure", 1895
- "The Fortune Teller", 1895, oil on canvas
- "Jeune fille assise tenant des fleurs dans les bras" ("Girl sitting with flowers in her arms"), 1889
- "Head of a Girl with Rose Corsage", 1890, oil on canvas
- "The Old Conqueror", 1904
- "Along the Seine towards Notre Dame", 1905, oil on panel
- "Fantaisie" ("Imagination"), unknown; shown at the Salon de la Société des Beaux-Arts, 1907
- "Portraite" ("Portrait"), unknown; shown at the Salon de la Société des Beaux-Arts, 1908
- "Les Couronnes" ("The Crowns"), unknown; shown at the Salon de la Société des Beaux-Arts, 1909
- "Étude" ("Study"), unknown; shown at the Salon de la Société des Beaux-Arts, 1910
- "Les Masques" ("The Masks"), unknown; shown at the Salon de la Société des Beaux-Arts, 1911
- "Femme nue étendue, tête de femme" ("Reclining female nude, woman's head"), unknown

== See also ==
- Legion of Honour
- Legion of Honour Museum
- List of Legion of Honour recipients by name (A)
- Ribbons of the French military and civil awards

== Sources ==
- Brooke, J.M. "AGO Vaults", AGO News, February, 1992.
