= 9.15 cm leichtes Minenwerfer System Lanz =

9.15 cm leichter Minenwerfer System Lanz
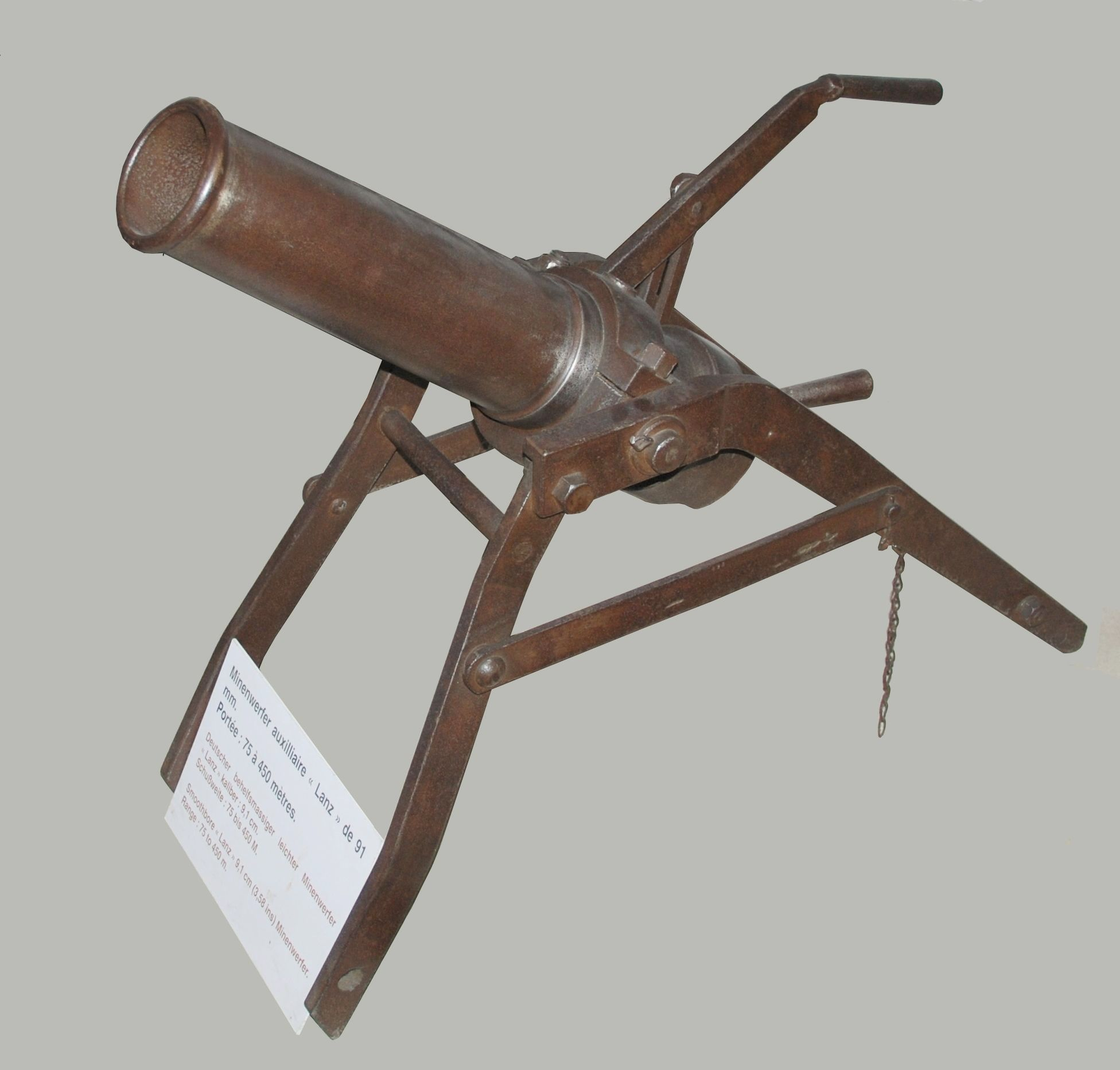
- Type: Light trench mortar
- Place of origin: German Empire

Service history
- In service: 1914–1918
- Used by: German Empire; Austria-Hungary; Ottoman Empire
- Wars: World War I

Production history
- Designer: Heinrich Lanz
- Designed: 1914–1915
- Produced: 1915–1918

Specifications
- Mass: 114 kilograms (251 lb)
- Barrel length: 595 millimetres (23.4 in)
- Shell: 3.8 kilograms (8.4 lb)
- Caliber: 91.5 mm
- Maximum firing range: 450 metres (490 yd) (M 14/16)

The 9.15 cm leichtes Minenwerfer System Lanz (Trench mortar) was a light mortar used by Germany, Austria-Hungary and Ottoman Empire in World War I, developed from the "9cm glatter leichter MinenWerfer Mauser" by Firma Heinrich Lanz & Co. The tube was made thicker and stronger which allowed for more powerful powder to be used, the breech was beefed up, and the safety pin closing system replaced with a screw locking system. The platform was made stronger and had more room for accessories than the Mauser.

It was a smooth-bore, breech-loading design that used smokeless propellant. It was chosen by the Austrians as an interim replacement for their 9 cm Minenwerfer M 14, pending development of a superior domestic design, which eventually turned out to be the 9 cm Minenwerfer M 17. The older Austrian design had a prominent firing signature, a less effective bomb and shorter range than the Lanz. Over 500 were ordered with deliveries beginning in April 1917.

== Bibliography ==
- Ortner, M. Christian (2007). The Austro-Hungarian Artillery From 1867 to 1918: Technology, Organization, and Tactics. Vienna: Verlag Militaria. ISBN 978-3-902526-13-7.
