= Philadelphe de Gerde =

French writer (1871–1952)

Philadelphe de Gerde (pseudonym for Madame Claude Duclos Requier; 21 March 1871 in Banios – 22 August 1952 in Gerde) was a French writer, best remembered for her works in Occitan, for which she was considered to be a Felibresse.

French composer Angèle Ravizé used de Gerde’s text for her song “Berceuse.”
