= Angèle Ravizé =

French ethnomusicologist, composer, educator

Angèle Ravizé (1887 - 1980) was a French ethnomusicologist, composer and educator who preserved French folk music and specialized in music education for young children.

== Biography ==
A native of southwest France, Ravizé attended the Paris Conservatory, where she studied with Andre Gedalge and won two prizes: a first prize for fugue and the Lepaulle prize for young teachers. Ravizé encouraged public schools to include instruction on recorders. In the late 1940s, she began producing children’s musical programs on the radio, often using preschool choruses accompanied by children’s orchestras. She collaborated with Marie-Rose Clouzot on several pedagogical publications.

Ravizé arranged French folk music for choral groups using regional dialects from Anjou, Brittany, Landes, Sarlat, and also from Canada. She set texts by the following writers to music: Auguste Angellier, Alexandre Arnoux, Claude Barangeon, Charles Boulen, Robert Browning, Charles Cros, Georges Gaudion, Philadelphe de Gerde (pseudonym for Madame Claude Duclos Requier), Alphonse-Marius Gossez, Carlos de Lazerme, Lucie Delarue-Mardrus, Clement Marot, Achille Millien, Jean Moréas (pseudonym for Ioannes Papadiamantopoulos), Jules Mousseron, Marie Vancalys (pseudonym for Marcelle Bertin), and Francis Yard (also known as Athanase François Yard).

Ravizé’s works were published by A. Colin Bourrelier, Durand et Cie, Editions Henry Labatiaz, Éditions H. Lemoine, Rouart, and Lerolle & Cie. Her publications include:

== Books ==
- 32 Leçons de Solfège sans Altérations

== Chamber music ==
- Les Amusements du XVIIIe Siècle: 15 Petits Duos (for recorder)
- Méthode pour Flûte Douce, Pipeau et Flageolet : Accompagnée d'Airs pouvant être Chantés ou Joués sur les Instruments

== Children’s Orchestra ==
- Pieces pour Orchestre Enfantin

== Piano ==
- Choix de Vieilles Chansons (for four hands)

== Vocal ==
- 10 Chansons d’Enfants
- 10 Chansons Populaire (for children’s voices or recorder)
- 10 Noels Bourguignons by Guy Barozai and Bernard de la Monnoye (harmonized by Ravizé)
- 15 Chansons Populaire (for two or three voices)
- Aquarelle (for three women’s voices)
- “Chanson de Patre”
- Chansons de Plein Air (for two voices; with Marie-Rose Clouzot)
- “Chanson du Labour”
- “Chanson Melodie”
- “Chanson pour Endormir”
- Chanson Rondes et Jeux (for small children; with piano accompaniment)
- Declin (for three women’s voices)
- Divertissements pour Voix d’Enfants (avec accompaniment ad libitum de flute douce et d’instruments a percussion)
- “Histoire d’un Potiron”
- “L’Imprudent Crapaud”
- “La Dispute”
- “La Marmite”
- “Le Pic du Mineur”
- “Legende des Croisades”
- “Les Importuns”
- Mere Michel (for three women’s voices)
- Nocturne (for three women’s voices)
- Petites Histoires Mises en Musique
- Pluies d’Ete (for three women’s voices)
- “Rac”
- “Trois Petits Oiseaux”
