= Aasen mortar =

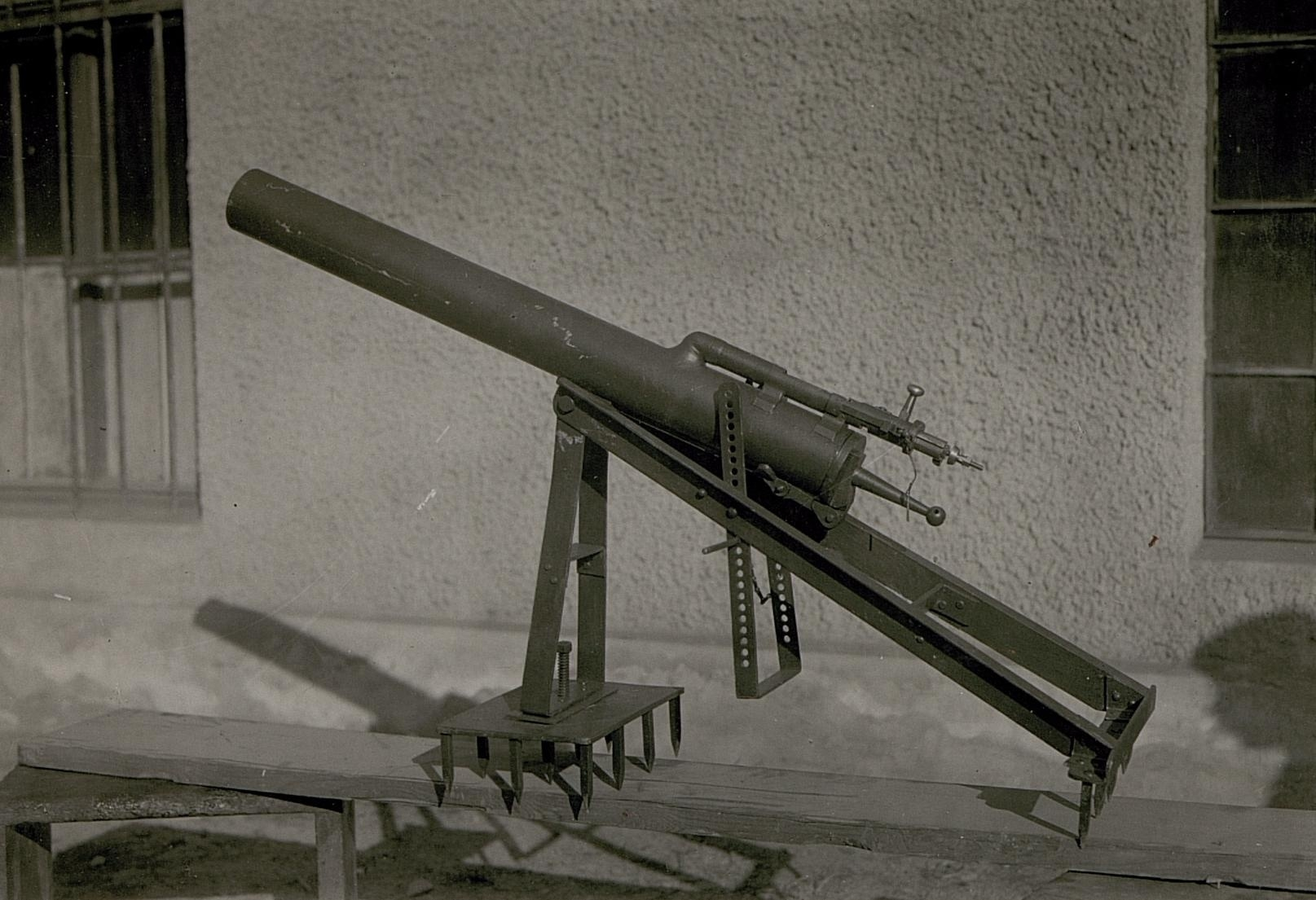
- Type: Gun-mortar
- Place of origin: France

Service history
- Used by: Russian Empire
- Wars: First World War

Production history
- Designer: Nils Aasen
- Designed: 1915

Specifications
- Mass: 54.2 lb (24.6 kg)

The Aasen mortar (Mortier Aasen) was a 3.5-inch (88.9-mm) gun-mortar (or bomb thrower under the classification of the time). The Aasen was invented in France in 1915 by Nils Aasen, a Norwegian arms designer. It was adopted by the Russian Empire in 1915-1916, and was used during the First World War.

The barrel of the mortar was steel. Aasen mortar was a breech loading weapon so a shell was loaded separately and the bolt action discharging a blank rifle round connected to a barrel. This device was a modified form of the obsolete Gras rifle, which was transferred to Russia by France in substantial numbers. The hoisting mechanism was made of two slats, attached to the rear of the barrel, and rod folding rack. The weight of the mortar in firing mode was approximately 1.5 pood (54.2 lbs).

Comparison of Russian Front mortars (1915—1917)
Mortar name	Calibre (mm)	Shell (kg)	Propellant mass (kg)	Muzzle velocity (metres/second)	Mass of the mortar (kg)	Rate of fire (rounds/minute)	Maximum range (metres)
G.R. 9 cm mortar	91	bomb 3.3	0.7	100	46	4–5	500
Aasen mortar	88.9	grenade 1.2	0.4	—	24	—	400
20-mm mortar	20	grenade 2.45	0.17	61	33	—	—
Likhonin mortar	48	bomb 3.0	0.34	16.8	16.5	—	500
