= 9 cm Minenwerfer M 14 =

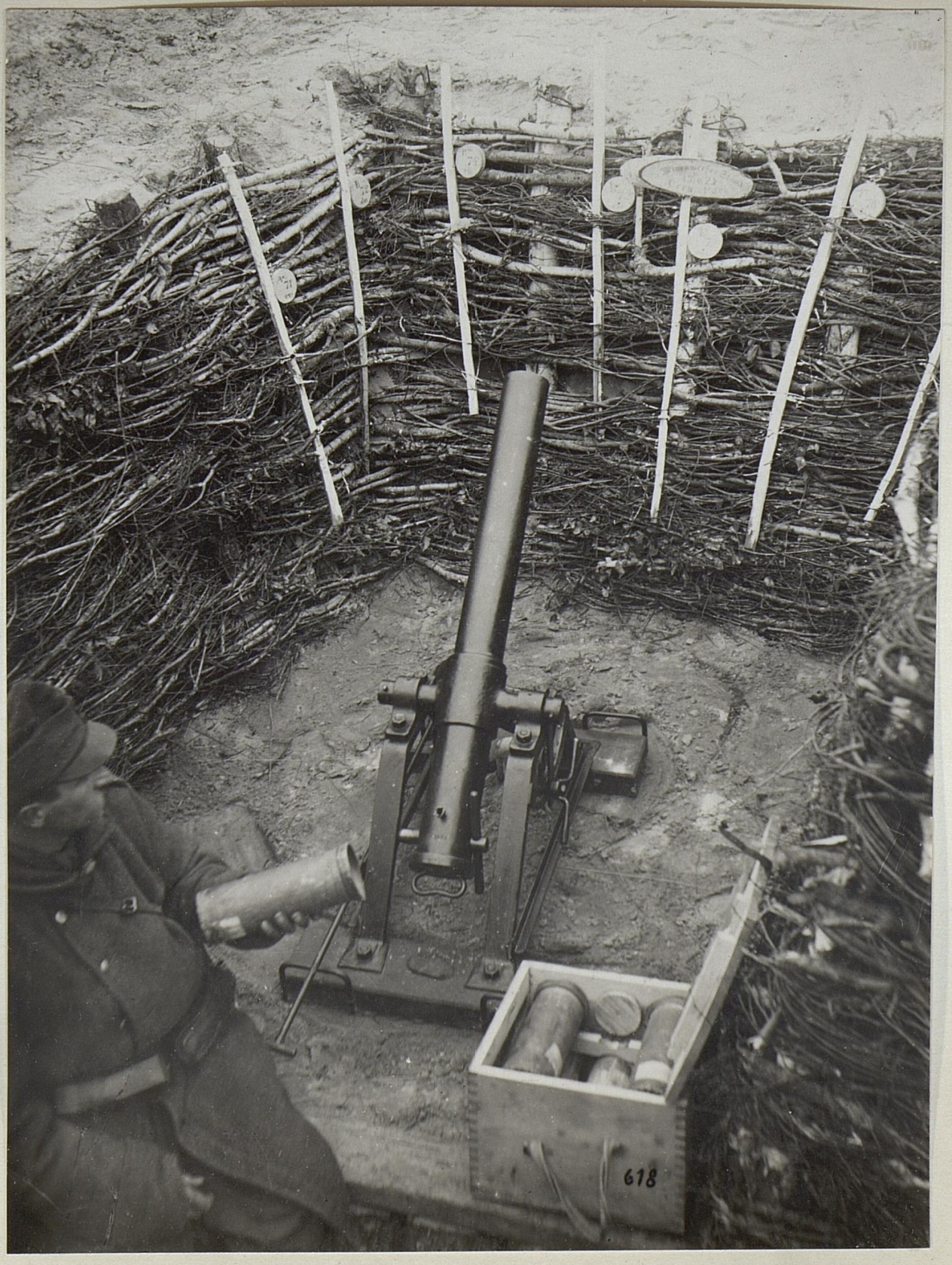
- 9 cm Minenwerfer M 14 in 1916
- Type: Light trench mortar
- Place of origin: Austria-Hungary

Service history
- In service: 1914–1918
- Used by: Austria-Hungary
- Wars: World War I

Production history
- Designer: TMK
- Designed: 1914
- Produced: 1914–17?
- Variants: M 14/16

Specifications
- Mass: 72 kilograms (159 lb)
- Crew: 3
- Shell: 2 kilograms (4.4 lb)
- Caliber: 90 mm
- Breech: interrupted-screw or cylinder lock
- Effective firing range: 199 metres (218 yd) (M 14)
- Maximum firing range: 345 metres (377 yd) (M 14/16)

The 9 cm Minenwerfer M 14 (trench mortar) was a light mortar used by Austria-Hungary in World War I. Originally named the '1-kg Minenwerfer', it was designed by the Army's own Technisches und Administratives Militär-Komitee (TMK) in an effort to quickly satisfy the demand from the front for a light mortar.

It had a number of issues with its ammunition, namely the black powder used as a propellant, which gave off copious smoke clouds on firing that revealed the tube's location and the mortar bomb fuses had a high rate of failure. The breech-loading mortar tube was mounted on a framework that didn't allow for any traverse, which meant that it was impossible to engage different targets without relaying the mortar. In turn the frame was mounted a rectangular firing platform.

The M 14/16 was a modernization of the M 14. It had a circular platform to provide a 360 degree traverse and weighed only 65 kilograms (143 lb). A later model allowed the mounting to be collapsed for ease of transport. A new M 16 mortar bomb that used the German Poppenberg fuze system generally cured the dud problem, but it still used black powder as its propellant. This was a severe tactical disadvantage and it was decided to purchase replacement mortars from the German firm of Heinrich Lanz from 1917.

Russia developed captured mortars into the 9 cm Mortar Type GR.

== External Images ==
https://picryl.com/topics/9+cm+minenwerfer+m+14?page=1
