= Helene Aldwinckle =

British translator and gallerist (1920–2020)

- Born: Helene Lovie Taylor; 26 October 1920
- Died: 24 April 2020 (aged 99)
- Education: University of Aberdeen
- Known for: Codebreaking at Bletchley Park
- Awards: Legion of Honour – Knight (2019)

Helene Aldwinckle (née Helene Lovie Taylor) (26 October 1920 – 24 April 2020), was a Bletchley Park codebreaker during the Second World War.

== Early life and family ==
Helene Lovie Taylor was born in Aberdeen, Scotland, in 1920, to Alexander and Helen Taylor (née Trail). Her father was a salesman. She grew up in Footdee, and attended Ashley Road Primary School then Aberdeen Academy, and eventually won a scholarship to study French and English at the University of Aberdeen. Taylor married John Aldwinckle, an RAF flight lieutenant, in February 1945. They had four children: Richard, Linda, Pamela, and Lady Diana Browne. John Aldwinckle died in 2012.

== Career ==
Helene Taylor joined Bletchley Park after completing a three year degree in French and English at Aberdeen University. She was recommended by Aberdeen University Principal William Hamilton Fyfe to the Foreign Office, in part because of her extraordinary memory and interest in languages. After two rounds of interviews with the Foreign Office in London and Aberdeen, Helene was selected by senior codebreaker Stuart Milner-Barry to become a permanent Foreign Office Civil Servant and was sent to live at Bletchley Park in the summer of 1942. During the first round of interviews, Aldwinckle was not aware of what she was being interviewed for, believing it to be a general civil service role.

Helene was initially based in Registration Room 1 (RR1), where she worked on encrypted signals. She became responsible for leading a training programme for American service personnel in 1943. When the programme was complete, Helene went to work in Quiet Room (QR) in Hut 6, the section of Bletchley Park tasked with deciphering Enigma codes. There she brought the knowledge and skills she developed training American personnel to longer term and more complicated encryption problems, including identifying Enigma radio networks and radio signals. After the Second World War ended, Helene stayed for a short time at Bletchley Park to help write the history of the work of Hut 6 but she had to leave the Foreign Office in 1945 due to a policy that said women could not stay employed after marriage.

Aldwinckle lived in Cologne and Berlin, accompanying her husband John in his role at MI6, moving initially in the 1950s. She worked for both the British Forces Network and Westdeutscher Rundfunk as a cultural events reporter. She continued her interest in amateur dramatics (having been involved in her youth in Aberdeen) joining the Berlin Amateur Dramatic Society. She accompanied John on subsequent postings to France, Germany and Britain, and they also lived in Rome, Brussels, and Mons.

Aldwinckle had a varied career post-Bletchley, becoming a translator for Thames and Hudson in 1967; and a gallerist at the Medici Gallery at the age of 54. She later worked at the Oxford Gallery, and in 1979 became the manager of the Medici.

== Honours ==
Aldwinckle was awarded a Knight in France's Legion of Honour on 19 July 2019 in a ceremony in London's French embassy. Theresa May thanked her, in May's final Prime Minister's Questions. A blue plaque honouring Helene Aldwinckle was unveiled at 76 Farquhar Road, Dulwich, on 4 September 2022.

== See also ==
- Legion of Honour
- Legion of Honour Museum
- List of Legion of Honour recipients by name (A)
- List of foreign recipients of Legion of Honour by name
- List of foreign recipients of the Legion of Honour by country
- List of foreign recipients of the Legion of Honour by decade
- List of British recipients of the Legion of Honour for the Crimean War
