= Nils Waltersen Aasen =

Norwegian arms inventor

- Born: March 30, 1878; Stadsbygd, Norway
- Died: December 27, 1925 (aged 47); Stoughton, Wisconsin, U.S.
- Occupation: Arms inventor
- Known for: Developed the modern hand grenade and land mine
- Awards: Legion of Honour - Knight (1915)

Nils Waltersen Aasen (30 March 1878 – 27 December 1925) was a Norwegian arms inventor. He has been credited with having developed the modern hand grenade and land mine just prior to World War I.

== Biography ==
Aasen was born at Stadsbygd in Rissa Municipality in Norway. He graduated in 1903 from the Fortress-Artillery School for Non-Commissioned Officers (Festningsartilleriets Underoffiserskole) at Oscarsborg Fortress. He started his experiments developing a hand grenade while serving as a sergeant at Oscarsborg. He was encouraged in his work by base commander and former defense minister Hans Georg Stang. However, the Norwegian Department of Defense showed little interest in Aasen's prototype. He then formed Aasen's Grenade Company (Det Aasenske Granatkompani) in Copenhagen, Denmark, which produced and exported of his grenade throughout Europe. Apart from new types of explosives, trench mortars, airplane bombs and land mines he also created several inventions for civil use. However, it was the development and production of arms that would bring him his greatest success.

Just prior to World War I, Aasen developed an anti-personnel mine which was meant as a weapon of deterrence. The invention caused enthusiasm within the French military but did not see production before the war. During World War I, Aasen was given the task of producing hand grenades for the French Army. He would have 13 factories with 13,000 employees working throughout the war. In 1917 his hand grenade was finally adopted by the Norwegian army, which later promoted him to premier-lieutenant (Løytnant).

Throughout his life he received a number of honorary degrees and awards for his inventions. Most notably, he was made an honorary colonel in the French Army, and a Knight in France's Legion of Honour in 1915. Later, Aasen's personal fortune was greatly reduced as a result of bad financial speculations, and because he had never patented the rights to several of his inventions. He died from tuberculosis in Stoughton, Wisconsin at the age of 47.

== Inventions ==
- Aasen bomb
- Aasen mortar

== See also ==
- Legion of Honour
- List of Legion of Honour recipients by name (A)
- List of foreign recipients of the Legion of Honour by country
- Legion of Honour Museum
