= Aasen Bomb =

- Type: Bomb
- Place of origin: Norway

Service history
- Used by: Kingdom of Italy French Third Republic German Empire
- Wars: World War I; Italo-Turkish War

Production history
- Designer: Nils Waltersen Aasen

Specifications
- Mass: 3 Kilograms
- Length: 105mm (head length); 330mm (handle length)
- Diameter: 80mm
- Detonation mechanism: Pressure, percussion, or electric ignition

An Aasen Bomb (Italian: Granata con manico e paracadute tipo Aasen A2) was an early World War I bomb fashioned from a hand grenade with a handle and parachute.

== History ==
=== Creation ===
The Aasen bomb was developed originally in Denmark by Nils Waltersen Aasen, who it was named after, by his Det Aasenske Granatkompani. He was a Norwegian arms inventor who developed a wide range of early prototypes which would later lead to the modern hand grenade for the military use.

=== Users ===
Italy would adopt the bombs in 1912 to assist with the Italian invasion of Libya. They were also adopted for a short period at the onset of World War I by Germany and France.

Other countries and leaders would also become interested in the weapon, with Russia ordering one million grenades and the Pope buying two thousand.

== Design ==
The bomb was made of an 80mm x 105mm piece of iron based sheet metal forming the head with a 330mm wooden handle. The bomb itself weighed 3 kg.

It could be used as a torpedo, land mine, or aerial bomb based on the type of detonator installed. Italy would famously use them in early aerial bombardments; dropping them on the intended target from Italian military aircraft. The aerial bombs would make use of a highly sensitive contact exploder to minimize misfire potential.

To ensure that it did not bury itself in the ground before exploding, the bomb would also release a small parachute. The parachute was also designed to neutralize issues with horizontal velocity. As the bomb fell an internal arming mechanism would either rotate around a threaded end of the handle, arming it as it fell, or burn a length of wool that acted as a safety mechanism.
