= 9 cm Mortar Type GR =

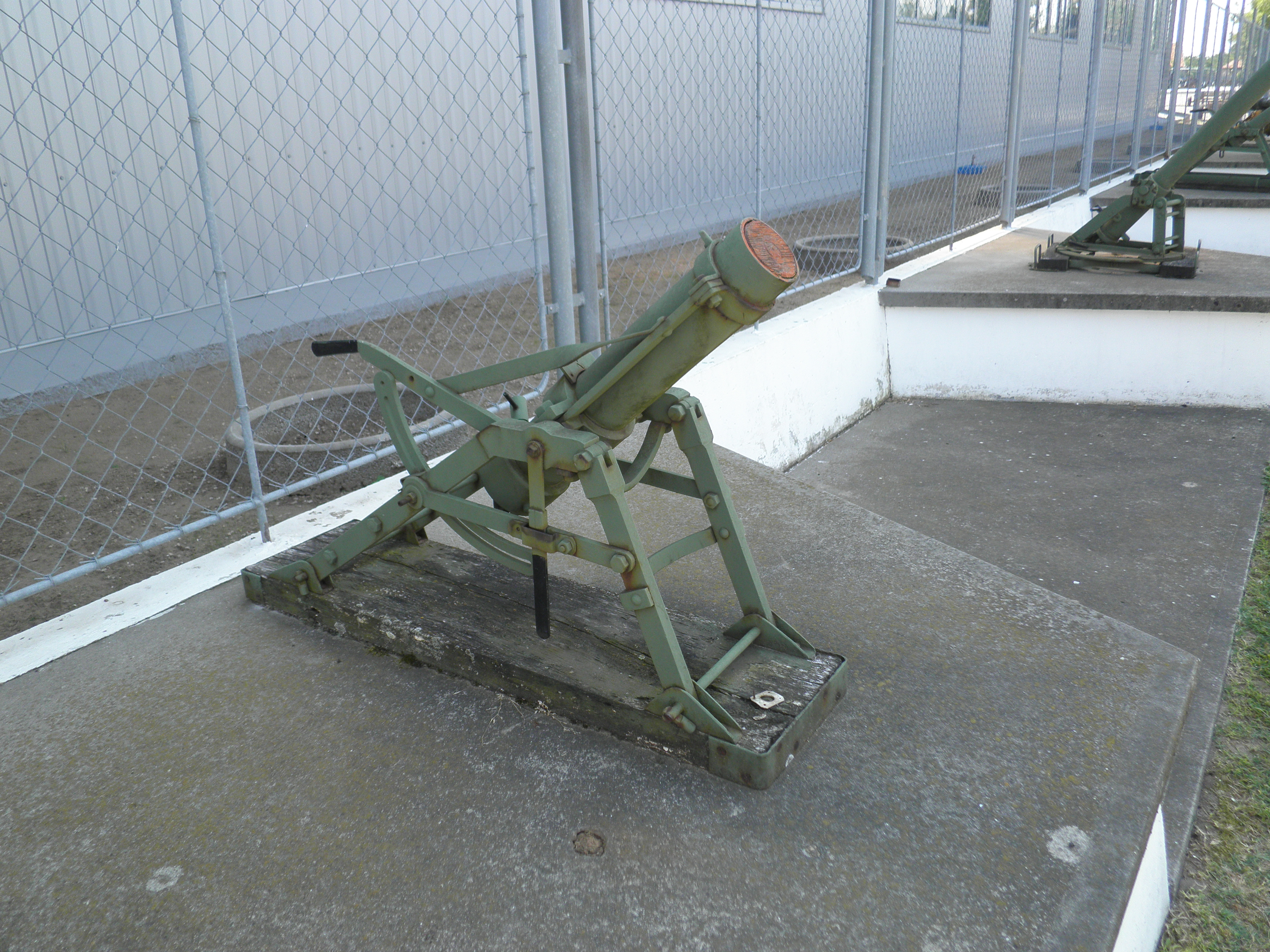
- Russian 9 cm Mortar Type GR in Army History Museum and Park in Kecel, Hungary.
- Type: Gun-mortar
- Place of origin: Russian Empire

Service history
- Used by: Russian Empire
- Wars: First World War

Production history
- Designed: 1915
- Produced: 1915–1917

Specifications
- Mass: 46 kg (101 lb)

The 9 cm mortar Type GR (German-Russian) was a World War I Russian mortar, developed circa 1915. It was a variant of captured Austro-Hungarian mortars 9 cm Minenwerfer M 14. 12,519 9 cm GR mortars were produced in 1915–1917 in Russia. Its shell is comparable in power to the modern 81 mm mortar shell.

== Comparison of Russian Front mortars (1915–1917) ==
Mortar name	Calibre (mm)	Shell (kg)	Propellant mass (kg)	Muzzle velocity (metres/second)	Mass of the mortar (kg)	Rate of fire (rounds/minute)	Maximum range (metres)
9 cm mortar Type GR	91	bomb 3.3	0.7	100	46	4–5	500
Aasen mortar	88.9	grenade 1.2	0.4	—	24	—	400
20-mm mortar	20	grenade 2.45	0.17	61	33	—	—
Likhonin mortar	48	bomb 3.0	0.34	16.8	16.5	—	500
