= Achille Millien =

French poet and folklorist

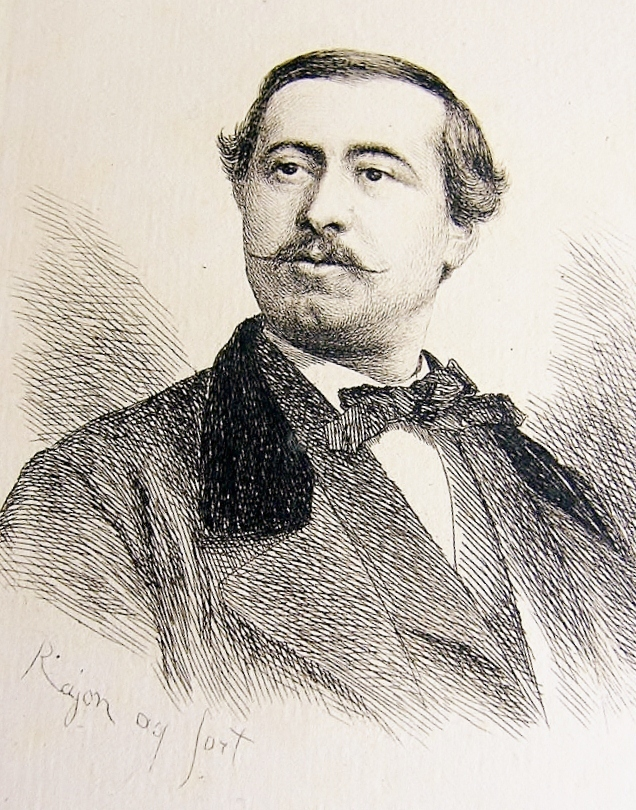
- Portrait of Achille Millien (engraving by Paul Adolphe Rajon)
- Born: Jean-Etienne-Achille Millien; 4 September 1838; Beaumont-la-Ferrière, Nièvre, France
- Died: 12 January 1927 (aged 88); Beaumont-la-Ferrière, France
- Occupations: Poet; Folklorist

Signature
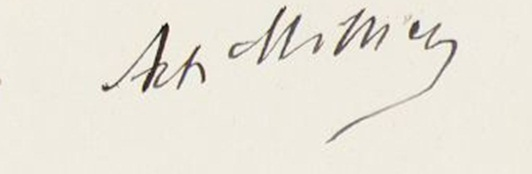

Achille Millien (4 September 1838 – 12 January 1927) was a French poet and folklorist.

His poetic work includes a dozen collections of rustic inspiration: La Moisson, Chants agrestes, Musettes et clairons, Chez nous, Aux champs et au foyer, L'Heure du couvre-feu...

== Biography ==
As soon as 1877, Millien began the systematic collection of folk tales, legends and folk songs of the Nivernais region. This considerable work, the results of which are still largely unpublished, makes Achille Millien "an exemplary reference in the world of contemporary ethnology".

In 1896, he established the Revue du Nivernais, a monthly publication which appeared until 1910.

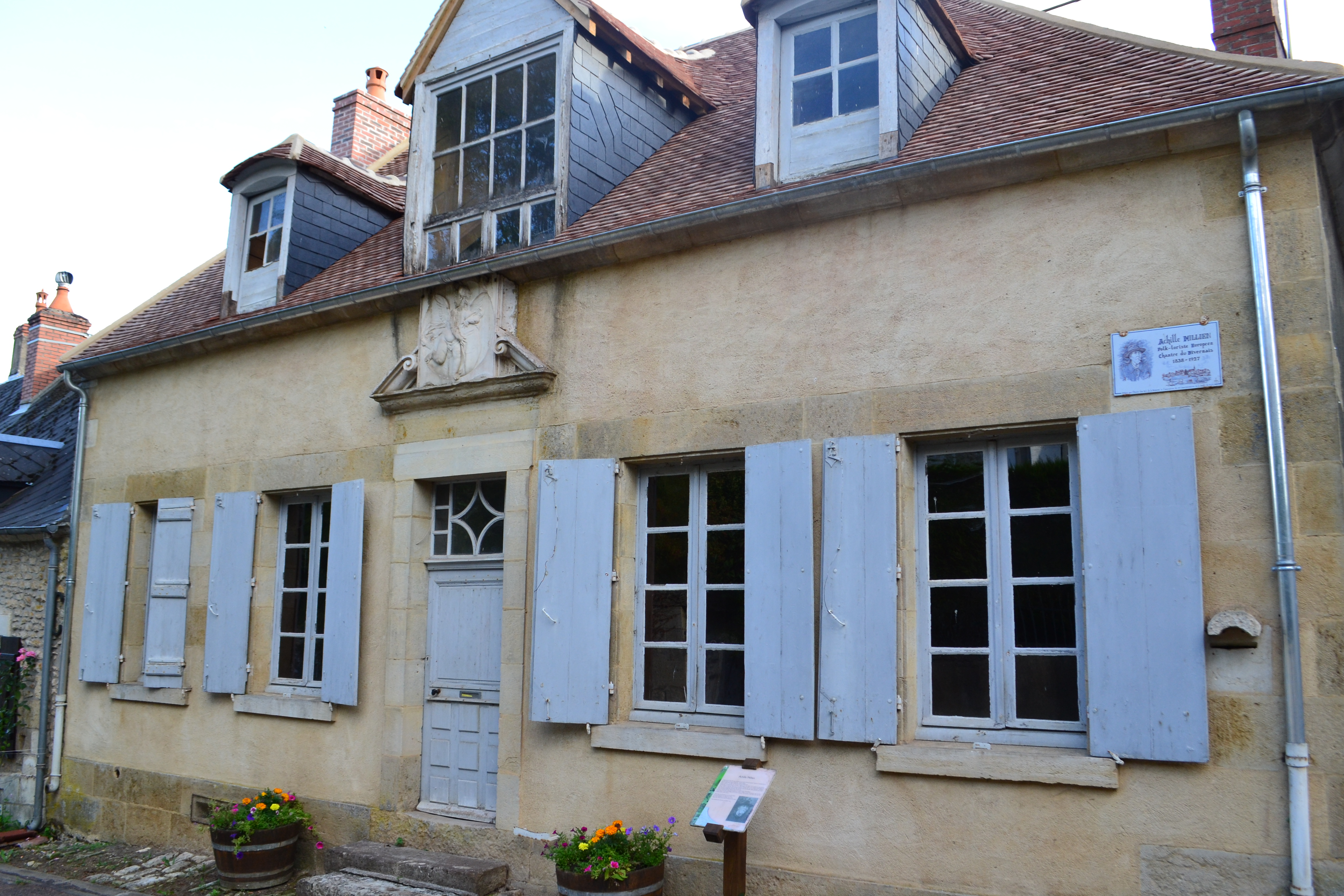
Achille Millien's house at Beaumont-la-Ferrière

== Works ==
- 1860: La Moisson, Paris, C. Vanier, 302 p.
- 1862: Chants agrestes, Paris, E. Dentu, 298 p.
- 1862: La Leçon rustique, Nevers, I.-M. Fay, 7 p.
- 1863–1864: Les Poèmes de la nuit. humoristiques, Paris, E. Dentu, 183 p.
- 1865–1867: Musettes et clairons, Paris, J. Tardieu, 136 p.
- 1870: Légendes d’aujourd’hui, poèmes suivis de lieds et sonnets, Paris, Garnier, 228 p.
- 1874: Voix des ruines. Légendes évangéliques. Paysages d’hiver, Paris, Alphonse Lemerre, 174 p.
- 1875: Nouvelles poésies (1864–1873), Paris, Alphonse Lemerre, VIII-404 p.
- 1877: Premières poésies (1859–1863), Paris, Alphonse Lemerre, 392 p.
- 1879: Poèmes et sonnets, Paris, Alphonse Lemerre, 172 p.
- 1891: Chants populaires de la Grèce, de la Serbie et du Monténégro, Paris, Alphonse Lemerre, 184 p.
- 1892–1893: Fleurs de poésie : poètes portugais, morceaux des poètes étrangers contemporains traduits en vers par Alphonse Millien, Nevers, G. Vallière, 16 p.
- 1893: Les chants oraux du peuple russe, Paris, H. Champion, 255 p.
- 1894: Ballades et chansons populaires tchèques et bulgares, Paris, Alphonse Lemerre, 121 p.
- 1894: Petits contes du Nivernais, Nevers, G. Vallière, 12 p.
- 1895–1896: Étrennes nivernaises, Nevers, G. Vallière.
- 1896: Chez nous, Paris, Alphonse Lemerre, 212 p.
- 1900: Aux champs et au foyer. Plein air. Intérieur. Rêves et souvenirs... , Paris, Alphonse Lemerre, 176 p.
- 1904: Le Parnasse du XIX: poètes néerlandais, hollandais et flamands, Paris, Alphonse Lemerre.
- 1906-1910: Chants et chansons populaires, Paris, E. Leroux, in 2 books and 3 volumes:
  - Book I (1906): Complaintes. Chants historiques (1 volume)
  - Book II (1908 and 1910): Chansons anecdotiques (2 volumes)
- 1910: L’Heure du couvre-feu. Genêts et bruyères. En Morvan. Chants de Noël. Ballades noires et chansons roses. Épaves, Paris, Alphonse Lemerre, 292 p.
- 1913: Choix de poésies, édition populaire, Nevers, T. Ropiteau, 56 p.
- 1915: Sous l’étoile. Petits poèmes de guerre, Nevers, T. Ropiteau.
- 1924: Roses de Noël. Derniers chants (1916-1924), Paris, Alphonse Lemerre, 142 p.

== Distinctions ==
- Chevalier of the Légion d'honneur by decree taken on 24 February 1921.

== Bibliography ==
- Léon Rogier, Les Poètes contemporains : Achille Millien, 1860, Paris, Vanier
- Clément Dubourg, Chez Achille Millien. Notes intimes pour servir à la bio-bibliographie du poète, 1900, Nevers, G. Vallière
- Marius Gerin, Anthologie du poète nivernais Achille Millien, 1924, Nevers/Paris, Fortin, 268 p.
- Maurice Mignon, Achille Millien. Poèmes choisis, 1924, Aix-en-Provence, éd. De la Revue Le Feu, 112 p.
- Paul Delarue, Renseignements divers sur la correspondance et les manuscrits d’Achille Millien in Mémoires de la Société académique du Nivernais, (pp. 123–129)
- Bernard Guineau, Chez nous, en terre nivernaise.., 1981, preface of the exhibition organised by les Amis de La Charité-sur-Loire.
- Charles Gardette, Achille Millien, folkloriste européen in Mémoires de la Société académique du Nivernais, 1983, No 65, (pp. 95–105)
- Conseil départemental de la Nièvre, Contes et chansons populaires du Nivernais-Morvan, 1993, Nevers, exhibition brochure
- Jean-François Counillon, Achille Millien, du poète de chez nous au chasseur de légendes in Bulletin de la Société nivernaise, 1998, No 47, (pp. 157–180)
- Pierre Marcotte, Achille Millien (1838–1927) : le folkloriste et son œuvre in Bulletin de of the Société nivernaise des lettres, sciences et arts, (pp. 95–111), 2011, Nevers
- Françoise Morvan, Achille Millien : Contes de Bourgogne, Éditions Ouest-France, Rennes, 2008 (edition of the tales published by Achille Millien during his lifetime)
- Alain Jolivet, Rimes et Reflets du Nivernais : Regards d'Achille Millien, Éditions de l'Armançon, 2010, 237 p.
- Achille Millien, Jacques Branchu (éd.) Contes inédits du Nivernais et du Morvan, Éditions José Corti, Paris, 2015 "Collection Merveilleux", Preface by Nicole Belmont. Postface by Jacques Branchu (Edition and classification by Jacques Branchu of a selection of unpublished folk tales, extracted from the totality of the archives concerning the tales collected by Achille Millien, classified and commented by J. Branchu).

== Filmography ==
- Daniel Hénard and Jacques Tréfouël, Achille Millien : Passeur de mémoire, France 3 Bourgogne Franche-Comté and "Les films du lieu-dit", 2005, DVD de 160 min + livre de 150 p.

== Music ==
- Discography: Harmonia Mundi, Le Pommier doux: Chansons traditionnelles de Nivernais Centre-France (with arrangements by Alain Gibert, Frédéric Paris, Évelyne Girardon, Trio Achille), Fédération des Associations de Musiques et Danses Traditionnelles (FAMDT), 2001
- French composer Angèle Ravizé used Millien’s text for her song “Chant de Labour.”
