= 9 cm Minenwerfer M 17 =

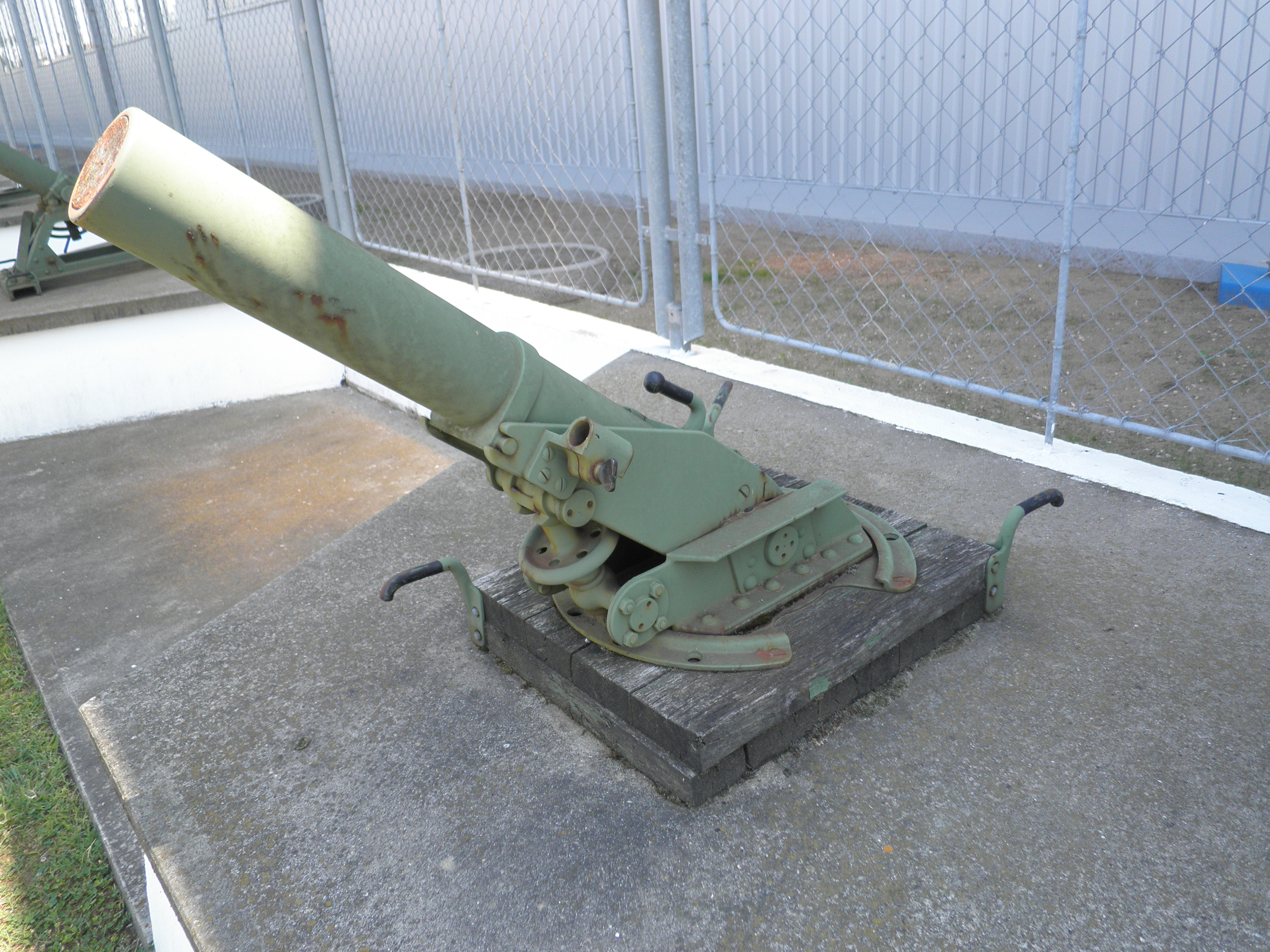
- Type: Light trench mortar
- Place of origin: Austria-Hungary

Service history
- In service: 1917–1918
- Used by: Austria-Hungary; Czechoslovakia
- Wars: World War I

Production history
- Designer: Hungarian Gun Factory
- Manufacturer: Hungarian Gun Factory
- Produced: 1917–1918

Specifications
- Mass: 114 kilograms (251 lb)
- Barrel length: 81 cm (2 ft 8 in) L/9
- Shell weight: 6.2 kg (13 lb 11 oz)
- Caliber: 91.5 mm (3.60 in)
- Elevation: +45° to +70°
- Traverse: 120°
- Effective firing range: 300 m (330 yd)
- Maximum firing range: 1.9 km (1.2 mi)

The 9 cm Minenwerfer M 17 (Trench mortar) was a medium mortar used by Austria-Hungary in World War I. It was developed by the Hungarian Gun Factory to meet a competition held on 3 October 1917 to replace both of the earlier light mortars, the M 14/16 and the Lanz. Production was slow to ramp up and only ten weapons could be delivered in January 1918. The first large deliveries were made in March 1918, but the raw materials crisis and strained production facilities hindered the TMK's plan to produce 2730 mortars by October 1918.

It was a breech-loading rifled weapon that used a shotgun-like break-action to open the breech. This was arranged so that the barrel returned to the proper elevation to speed up the rate of fire. The carriage was mounted on a small metal rectangular firing platform with four carrying handles that permitted some amount of traverse.

In Czech service the mortar was known as the 9 cm Lehky minomet vz. 17 and the German designation for captured Yugoslav mortars was 9cm Granatwerfer 309(j). Although still active in the Czech armory at the time of the German takeover there are no records of the Germans using it.
