= Abar, the First Black Superman =

1977 film by Frank Packard

- Directed by: Frank Packard
- Written by: J. Walter Smith (scenario)
- Screenplay by: James Smalley
- Story by: James Smalley
- Produced by: J. P. Joshua
- Starring: J. Walter Smith; Tobar Mayo; Roxie Young
- Cinematography: Ronald Víctor García
- Edited by: Jack Tucker
- Production company: Jos-To Productions
- Distributed by: Mirror Releasing; Xenon Productions
- Release date: March 1977 (US ltd.)
- Running time: 102 minutes
- Country: United States
- Language: English

Abar, The First Black Superman is a 1977 blaxploitation superhero film directed by Frank Packard and starring J. Walter Smith, Tobar Mayo, and Roxie Young. When it was released on VHS in 1990, it was re-titled In Your Face.

== Premise ==
Upon moving into a bigoted neighbourhood, the scientist father of a persecuted black family gives a superpower elixir to a tough bodyguard, who then becomes a superpowered crimefighter.

== Cast ==
- J. Walter Smith as Dr. Kinkade
- Tobar Mayo as John Abar
- Roxie Young as Mrs. Kinkade
- Gladys Lum as Debbie Kinkade
- Tony Rumford as Tommie Kinkade
- Rupert Williams as Jim Kinkade
- Tina James as Susan Kinkade
- Art Jackson as Dudley
- Allen Ogle as Peabody
- Joe Alberti as Hunt
- Dee Turguand as Mabel

== Production ==
The film was the brainchild of James Smalley, a black pimp from Louisiana, and Frank Packard, a white actor and screenwriter; it was filmed partly in a working whorehouse. Smalley ran out of money before the film was completed, and had to sell the film to the owner of a film processing lab to settle his unpaid bills.

Originally titled SuperBlack, it was completed in 1975, but not released until 1977, under the name Abar, The First Black Superman; it was renamed again for VHS release as In Your Face. Its original release was very limited, primarily to what was known as the "Chitlin' Circuit" of Southern drive-ins.

The film was shot in the Baldwin Hills and Watts neighbourhoods of Los Angeles without permits to do so, and at one point actual motorcycle gang members who had been hired to play a black motorcycle gang surrounded the cars of the white police officers who had been called in to shut down shooting. The officers chose to stay in their cars.
