= Édouard Alexandre =

French organ maker (1824–1888)

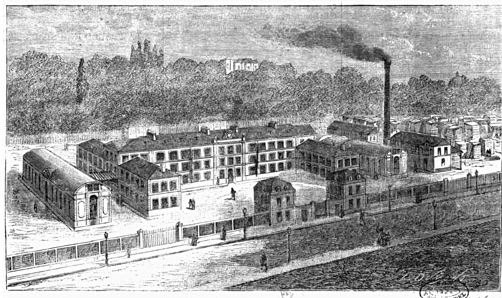
Factory of Alexandre Pere et Fils (c. 1860)

Édouard Alexandre (4 December 1824 – 1888) was a French organ manufacturer and inventor.

He was born in Paris, France and learned his trade in the factory established by his father, Jacob Alexandre, at Ivry near Paris. In 1844, he received an interest in the business. Édouard and his father were known for their inventions such as the "piano-organ," the "piano-Liszt," and the "organ-melodium," also known as the "Alexandre organ."

In 1856, the firm of Alexandre was awarded a medal of honor at the Paris Exhibition for its popular instruments, which were instrumental in promoting a love of music throughout France. He was made a chevalier of the Legion of Honour in 1860.
