= Auguste Angellier =

French educator (1848–1911)

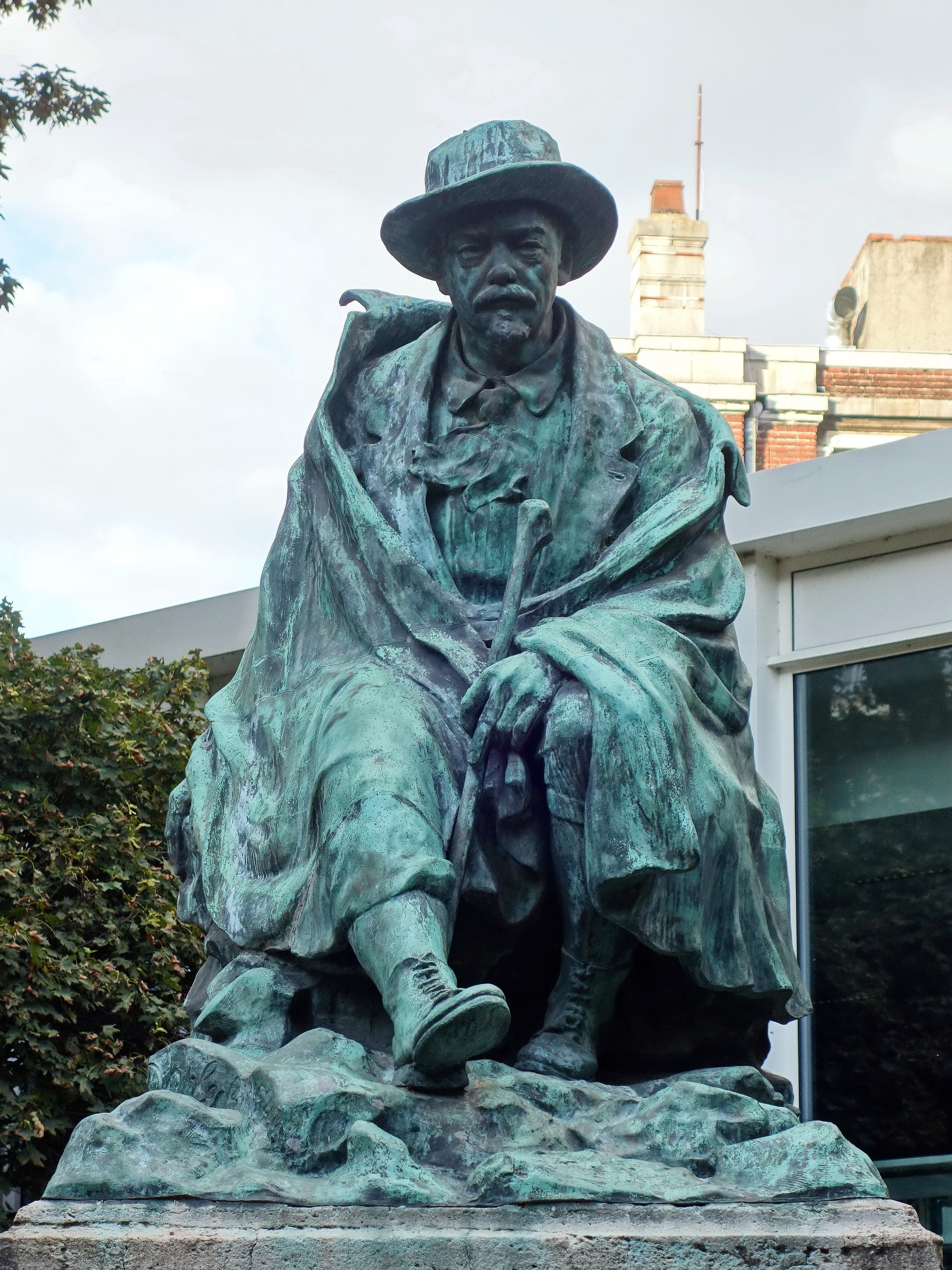
- The statue of Auguste Angellier(1848-1911)
- Born: 1 July 1848; Dunkerque, Nord, France
- Died: 28 February 1911 (aged 62); Boulogne-sur-Mer, Pas-de-Calais, France
- Occupations: Poet, teacher
- Writing career
- Genres: Literary criticism, poetry

Auguste Angellier (1 July 1848 – 28 February 1911) was the first teacher of language and English literature at the Faculté de Lettres of Lille, before becoming its dean from 1897 to 1900. A literary critic and historian of literature, he was also a poet, and made sensation at the Sorbonne attacking the theories of Hippolyte Taine in his thesis about Robert Burns in 1893.

== Biography and career ==
=== Early life and education ===
Auguste Angellier was born on 1 July 1848 in Dunkerque in the department of Nord, to a carpenter father and a secretary mother. He was educated in Boulogne-sur-Mer after the precocious death of his father. His attachment to this town had never denied. He then prepared the contest of the École Normale Supérieure at the Lycée Louis-le-Grand in Paris in 1866. During the written and oral test of the exam, he was rejected from the high school by the head teacher who considers him, wrongly by others, as a leader of a rebellion movement concerning the bad quality of the food. This disastrous episode of his education forced him to leave to England, due to a lack of financial resources, where he received a job offer of a teacher in a small boarding school.

=== Early career and later training ===
Engaged as a volunteer during the Franco-Prussian War of 1870, he moved to Lyon and then to Bordeaux. A serious breathing infection forced him to go back to Paris, during the Commune, and at the end of the war, he was named repeater at the Lycée Louis-Descartes. He was finally allowed to enter in the Instruction Publique. He graduated soon after.

Accepted at a certificate for English teaching, two years later, he taught as a repeater for three years, a required period at that time before registering to prepare the agrégation. He graduated with this contest at the age of 28, and taught right after at the Lycée Charlemagne in Paris, until his departure to England in 1878.

=== Poetry and English teaching ===
Angellier cultivated numerous literary friendships, and developed his sensitivity as a poet. His reputation came better in his academic work than in his poetry work. Until that period, he hesitated between journalism and teaching, but this leave just accorded to him permitted him to become interested at the reform project in the study of modern languages in France, through the study of the system in the English universities.

In 1881, a job of Maître de conférences in Douai, gave him the opportunity of a brilliant career as an English teacher (the Faculté de Lettres of Douai was transferred to Lille in 1887). Twelve years later, he made two thesis, each one dedicated to a poet : the major thesis to Scottish poet Robert Burns, and an additional thesis to John Keats, entirely written in Latin. Even the quotations of the poems by Keats were written in Latin.

Since then, Angellier held the title of professor. He was also the president of the jury at the agrégation of English from 1890 to 1904, and since February 1897, he became the dean with several responsibilities. In 1902, he returned as a Maître de conférences at the École Normale Supérieure and went back to Lille in 1904.

French composer Angèle Ravizé used Angellier's text for her composition “La Saint-Valentin.”

== Death ==
Auguste Angellier died on 28 February 1911, in Boulogne-sur-Mer.
