= Nicole Abar =

French footballer (born 1959)

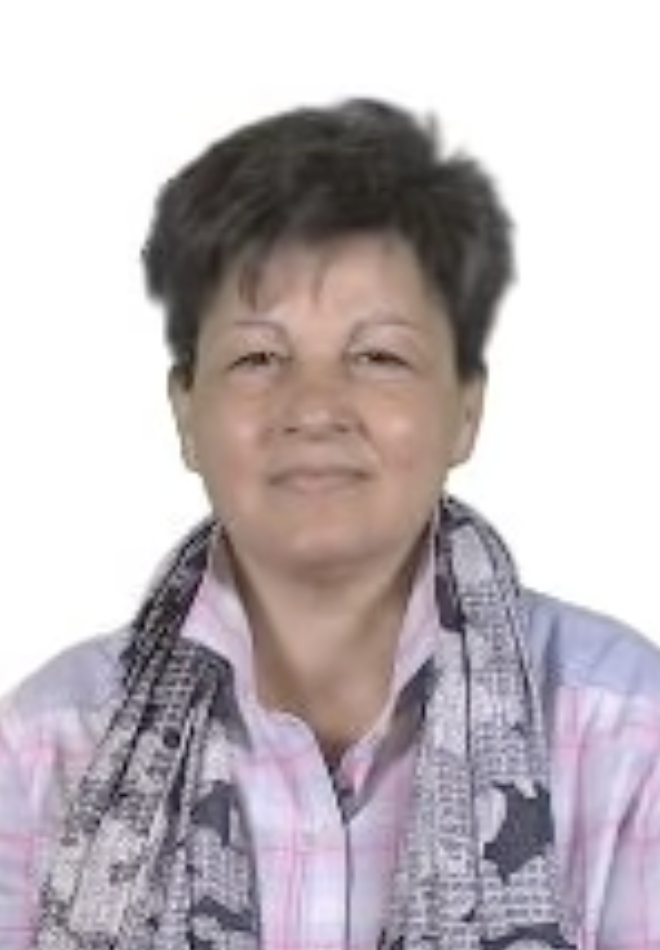
- Abar in 2015

Personal information
- Full name: Nicole Abar
- Date of birth: 5 July 1959 (age 67)
- Place of birth: Toulouse, Haute-Garonne, France
- Position: Midfielder

Senior career*
Years	Team	Apps	(Gls)
- Reims

International career
1977–1987	France	15	(2)
- * Club domestic league appearances and goals

Nicole Abar is a French former footballer who played as a forward for Reims of the Division 1 Féminine.

== Post career ==
Since retiring from professional football, Abar took up coaching Toulouse from 2004–2007.

== Honours ==
Orders

- Knight of the Legion of Honour: 2016
